= National Cycle Route 69 =

Cycle route in the United Kingdom

NCN Route 69
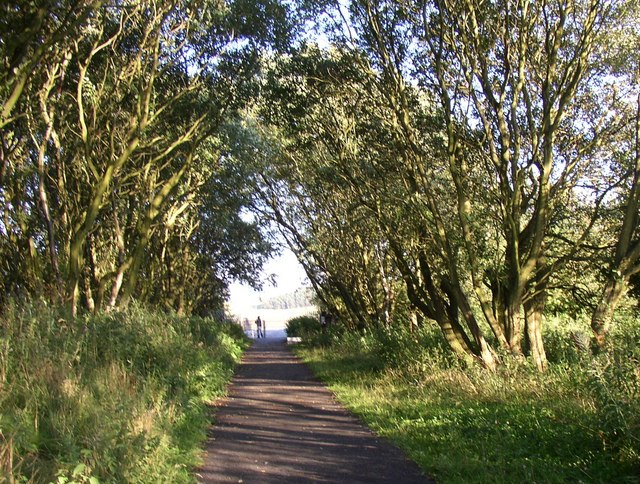
- The Great Northern Railway Trail near Cullingworth
- Length: 72 km (45 mi)
- Designation: UK National Cycle Network
- Trailheads: Hest Bank (west) to Cleethorpes (east)
- Use: Cycling
- Website: sustrans.org.uk

National Cycle Network (NCN) Route 69 is a Sustrans National Route that runs from Hest Bank to Cleethorpes. The route is incomplete and consists of one long section in Lancashire, and seven short sections in West Yorkshire. The open sections are signed in both directions.

== History ==
The route uses several railway paths including the Midland Railway route to Morecambe and the Great Northern Railway's Queensbury lines.

According to the year 2000 Official Guide to the National Cycle Network, the designation 69 was slated to be used for a route from Derby to Berwick upon Tweed, however that route has been given the number 68.

== Route ==
Starting at a junction with Route 6 on the towpath of the Lancaster Canal, Route 69 leaves Hest Bank in a south west direction following the promenade to Morecambe. The Midland Hotel signals the start of The Way of the Roses, a 170 miles (270 km) challenge ride from Morecambe to Bridlington. The Way of the Roses follows route 69 as far as Clapham. Heading inland the route follows a railway path to Lancaster where it crosses the River Lune on the Lune Millennium Bridge. It crosses the Lune again at Crook o'Lune and immediately joins the roads for the rest of this section routing via Greesingham, Hornby and Wray. This section of NCN 69 ends at the junction with NCN 68 in Clapham, North Yorkshire. 68 can be followed to Gargrave, but it doesn't connect with the following section of 69.

The next section of the route starts at Silsden, following a minor road before joining the Leeds & Liverpool Canal to reach Riddlesden and a junction with NCN 696.

The next two sections, (5 miles (8 km) in total), are between Cullingworth and Queensbury and make up the Great Northern Railway Trail. The first section crosses the viaducts at Cullingworth (449 feet (137 m)) and Hewenden (1,024 feet (312 m)). The second, between Thornton and Queensbury crosses the Thornton viaduct (902 feet (275 m)).

Plans to complete Route 69 between Keighley and Halifax are under development. Sustrans have published a study into "the economic impact of reopening walking and cycling routes around Queensbury Tunnel."

A further four discontinuous, short traffic free sections of route are spread through Halifax, Huddersfield, Dewsbury and Wakefield.

The long term plan is for the route to extend to Cleethorpes via Pontefract, Althorpe and Caistor.

== Related NCN routes ==
Route 69 is the western end of the Way of the Roses along with:

- 68
- 688
- 65
- 658
- 66
- 164
- 1

Route 69 meets the following routes:

- 6 at Hest Bank and Lancaster
- 700 at Hest Bank and Lancaster
- 68 at Clapham, North Yorkshire
- 696 at Keighley
- 66 at Halifax, Bradley and Dewsbury
