= White Rose cycle route =

Cycle route in Yorkshire, England

Coordinates: 54.121°N 1.192°W

The White Rose Cycle Route in Yorkshire, England, part of the National Cycle Network (NCN), was opened by Sustrans in 1998. It linked Middlesbrough with the City of Kingston upon Hull via the North York Moors, the Vale of York, the Yorkshire Wolds, a distance of 123 miles (198 km) and in some descriptions continued to Hornsea on the coast (131 miles (211 km)). A map and guide for the route were published in 1999 and 2000.

The route is no longer branded as the White Rose Route.

== NCN routes on White Rose route ==
- Route 1
- Route 65
- Route 66
- Route 71
- Route 656
- Route 657
- Route 658
