= Way of the Roses =

Long-distance cycle route in England

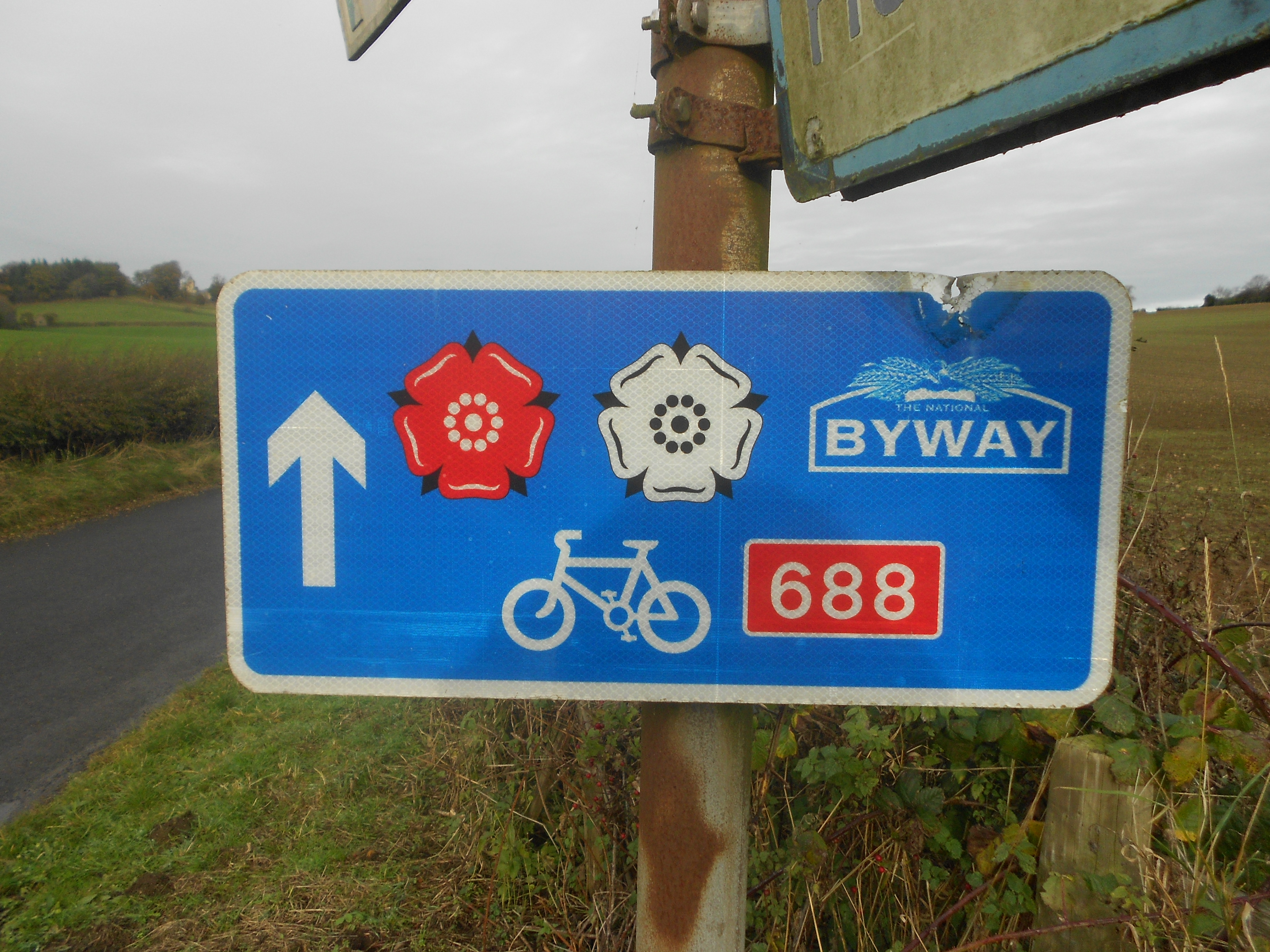
- A typical Way of the Roses sign showing the red and white roses, a direction arrow and route number
- Length: 170 mi (270 km)
- Location: Lancashire & Yorkshire, United Kingdom
- Established: 2010
- Designation: NCN routes: 69; 68; 688; 65; 658; 66; 164; 1
- Trailheads: Morecambe (west); 54.0710°N 2.8760°W; Bridlington (east); 54.0924°N 0.1772°W
- Use: cycling pedestrians
- Highest point: Greenhow, 1,325 ft (404 m)
- Waymark
- Surface: Varies from on-road, to traffic-free tarmac, compacted surface and cinder track
- Website: Guide to the Way of the Roses

Trail map
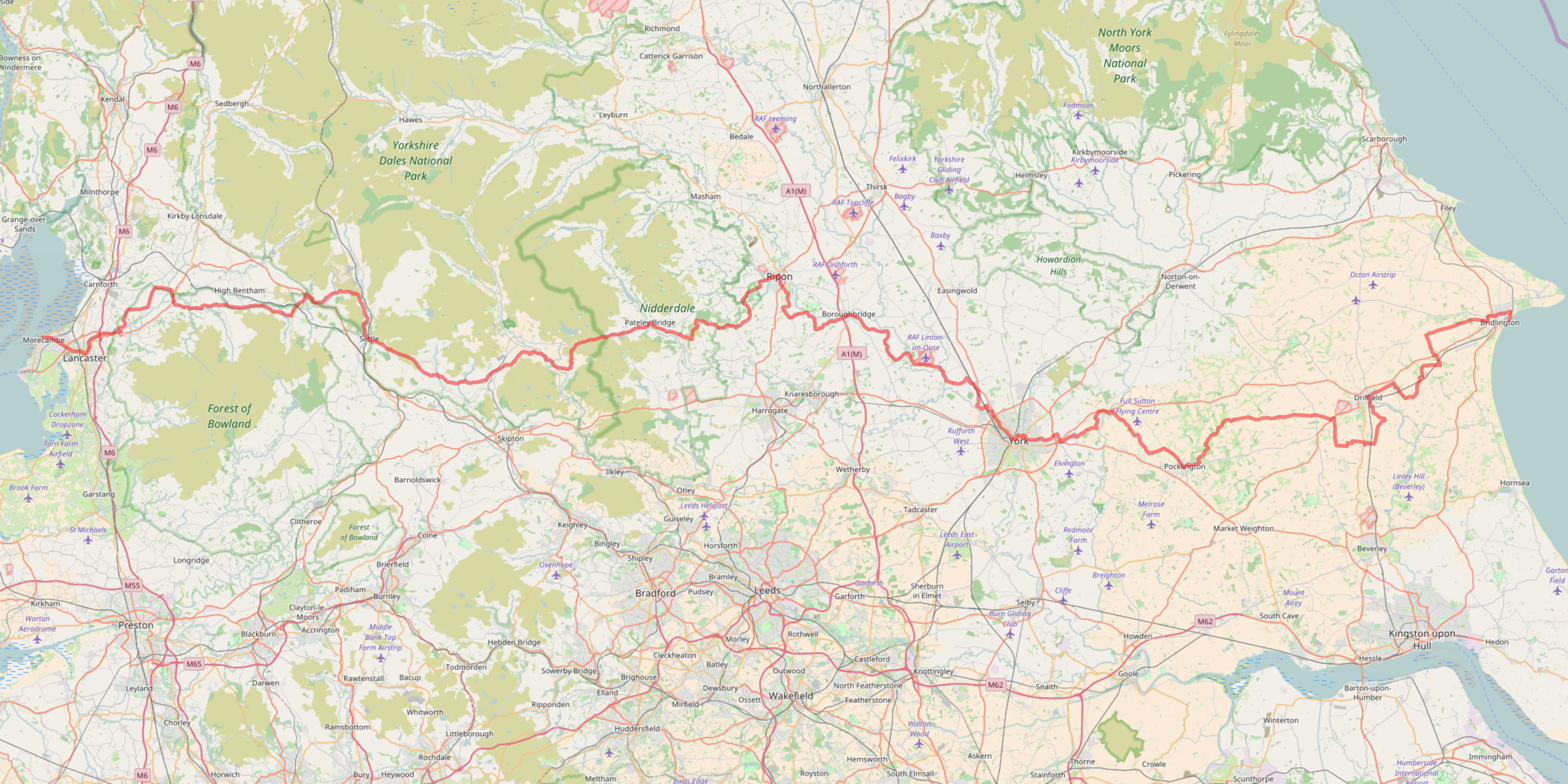
- Map of the Way of the Roses cycle route

The Way of the Roses is a coast-to-coast long-distance cycle route of Great Britain and is based on minor roads, disused railway lines and specially constructed cycle paths. It lies entirely within the counties of Lancashire and Yorkshire, crossing the Yorkshire Dales and the Yorkshire Wolds in the North of England, passing through the historic cities of Lancaster, Ripon and York and scenic towns and villages including Settle and Pateley Bridge.

At 170 miles (270 km) long, the route is designed for the whole range of cyclists, from families to cycling club riders. Although a challenge with some hard climbs, the highest point being over 1,312 feet (400 m), the route is fully open and signed.

The route is named after the Wars of the Roses, a 15th-century war between the English dynastic families Lancaster and York.

== History ==
The route was developed by Sustrans and part of the National Cycle Network (NCN Route 69) in partnership with various local authorities, Cyclists Touring Club, Bridlington Renaissance Partnership and Welcome to Yorkshire amongst others. The route was opened in 2010 running from Morecambe on the west coast of Lancashire to the east coast at Bridlington. A second diversion between Pateley Bridge and York that goes via Harrogate and Knaresborough was opened in 2011. Additionally, there is a section that links Kingston upon Hull to the cycle route that joins/leaves near Pocklington rather than going to/from Bridlington.

== Art ==
A number of public artworks have been commissioned for the route. British artist Matt Baker is developing a series of linked artworks at various points along the route. As of 2017, this work has not yet been completed.

== Route ==
The route is signposted with signs carrying the name of the route or marked with the red and white heraldic roses from which the name of the route is derived.

The route starts in the resort town of Morecambe, Lancashire loosely following the River Lune and the River Wenning into the Pennines at Settle and entering the Yorkshire Dales National Park. From there it makes its steepest climb (eastwards) across the edge of Rye Loaf Hill before descending to Airton. From there it heads northeast to Grassington before following the River Wharfe for several miles and then turning towards the high point of the route at Greenhow and descending to Pateley Bridge on the River Nidd. Beyond Pateley Bridge, the hills are significantly lower and after Ripon (with a short exception of the Yorkshire Wolds) the route is more or less flat, passing through York before finally reaching Bridlington and the North Sea. The route is made up primarily of:

- minor roads – quiet, country roads (90%)
- main roads – mainly short sections through urban areas (5%)
- cyclepaths/off road – disused railway lines, etc. (5%)

The Way of The Roses is best ridden from west to east to take advantage of the prevailing winds from the West and the more favourable gradients. Tradition dictates that a rider starts by dipping their back wheel in the Irish Sea, and only ends when their front wheel gets a dip in the North Sea at the finish. It is typically completed in 3–5 days.

== Related NCN routes ==
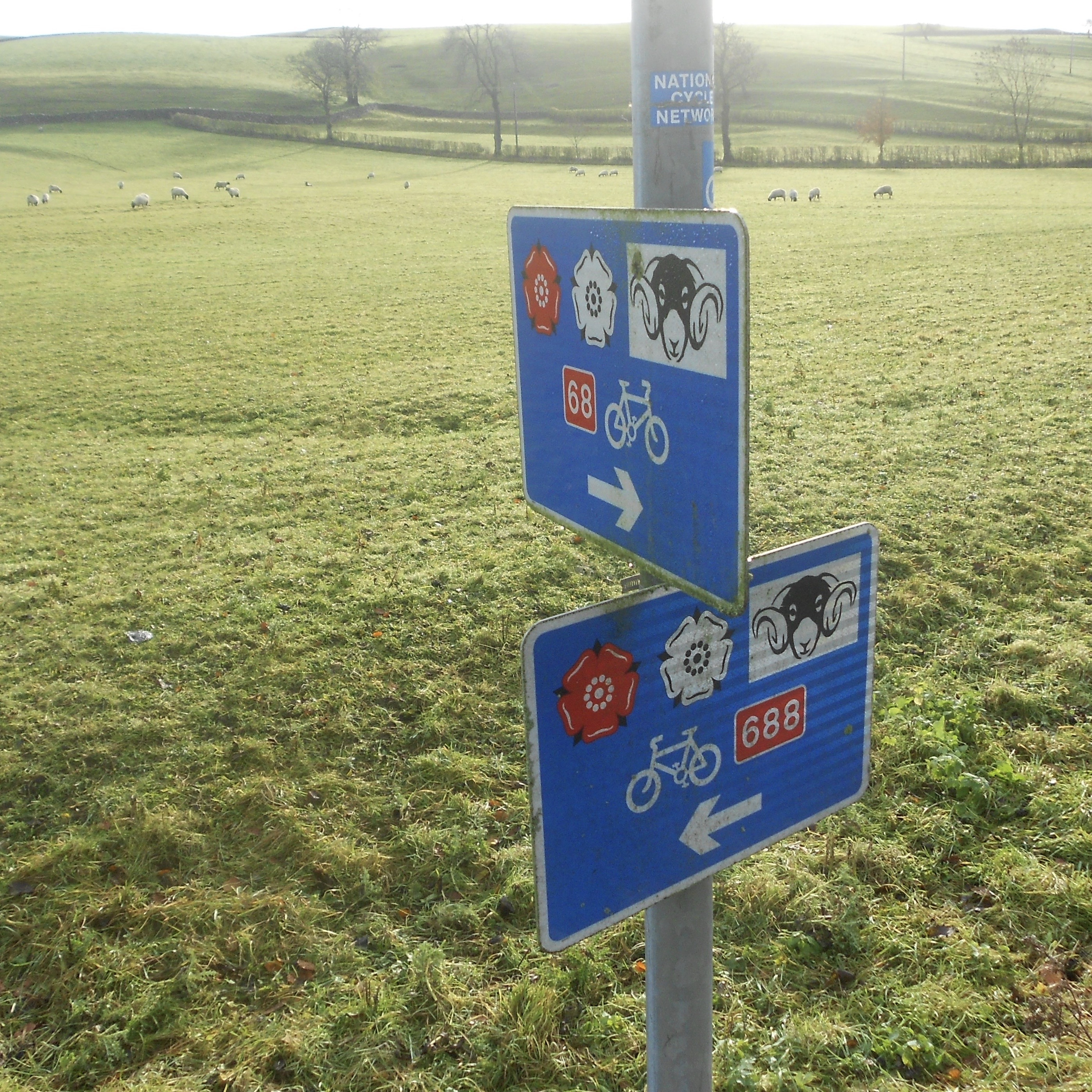
Way of the Roses signs at Winterburn, the junction between routes 68 and 688.

The Way of the Roses makes use of eight National Cycle Network routes. Starting in Morecambe on Route 69. It transfers to Route 68 at Clapham (54.1173°N 2.3918°W), on to Route 688 at Winterburn (54.0226°N 2.1025°W), and Route 65 at Linton-on-Ouse (54.0387°N 1.2351°W). Through central York (53.9614°N 1.0924°W) it follows the short Route 658 before joining Route 66 (53.9597°N 1.0511°W). At Pockington (53.9309°N 0.7758°W) it takes Route 164 over the Yorkshire Wolds before picking up Route 1 near Hutton Cranswick (53.954°N 0.498°W), which it then uses to the finish in Bridlington.

The route links to other parts of the NCN so can be used as part of a longer cycle tour. In addition to the above listed routes the way of the Roses has junctions with Route 700 at Morecambe (54.0710°N 2.8760°W), Route 6 at Lancaster (54.0522°N 2.8025°W), Route 67 near Fountains Abbey (54.0914°N 1.5771°W). and Route 167 at Huggate in the Yorkshire Wolds(53.984°N 0.6638°W).

Route maps for the Way of the Roses and detailed route guides from other publishers are available from Sustrans.
