= National Cycle Route 10 =

Cycle route in the United Kingdom

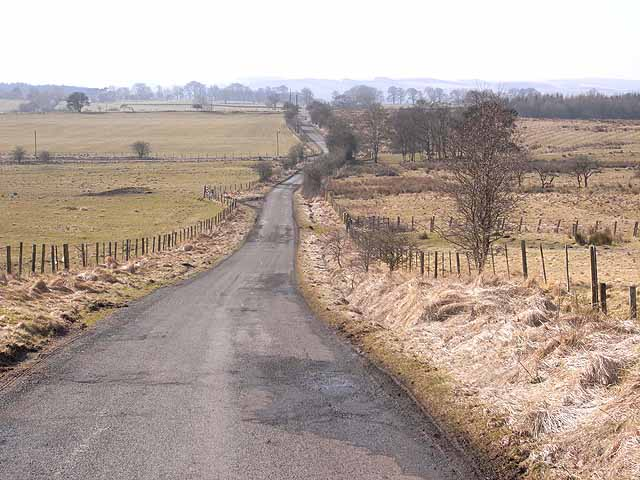
- Route 10 in Northumberland

Part of Reivers Route
- Length: 217 km (135 mi)
- Location: Cumbria and Northumberland, UK
- Designation: UK National Cycle Network
- Trailheads: Cockermouth (west); 54.6642°N 3.3614°W; Percy Main (east); 54.9965°N 1.4646°W
- Use: Cycling
- Highest point: Caplestone Fell, 366 m (1,201 ft)
- Lowest point: Percy Main, 6 m (20 ft)
- Difficulty: Challenging
- Waymark: 10
- Website: www.sustrans.org.uk/find-a-route-on-the-national-cycle-network/route-10/

National Cycle Network (NCN) Route 10 is a Sustrans National Route that runs from Cockermouth to North Shields in the United Kingdom. The route is 217 km (135 miles) long and is fully open and signed in both directions.

== History ==
Route 10 forms the majority of the 278 km (173-mile) Reivers Cycle Route which was conceived to be a mirror image of the popular C2C cycle route. Originally Route 10 was designated as Sustrans regional route and signed with blue numbers. It has been reclassified as a national route with red numbers.

== Route ==
=== Cockermouth to Carlisle ===
The western trailhead is at Cockermouth. It uses minor roads as far as Dalston where it joins Route 7 and follows the Caldew Cycleway riverside traffic-free path into central Carlisle.

=== Carlisle to Bellingham ===
Heading north out of Carlisle the route continues to follow Route 7 on minor roads as far as Westlinton and continues as Route 10 into the Kershope Forest where it meets the Scottish border. Mainly traffic-free through the Kielder Forest to the reservoir where it continues on minor roads to Bellingham.

=== Bellingham to North Shields ===
Heading east the route follows minor roads to Ponteland. Passing to the north of Newcastle upon Tyne the route reaches its eastern trailhead at Percy Main, North Shields.

== Related NCN routes ==
Route 10 is part of the Reivers Cycle Route along with:

- 7
- 71
- 72
- 68
- 1

Route 10 meets the following routes:

- 71 at Cockermouth
- 7 at Dalston and Westlinton
- 68 at Bellingham
- 72 and 1 at Percy Main
