= National Cycle Route 688 =

Bikeway in North Yorkshire, England, connecting Winterburn and Linton-on-Ouse

NCN Route 688
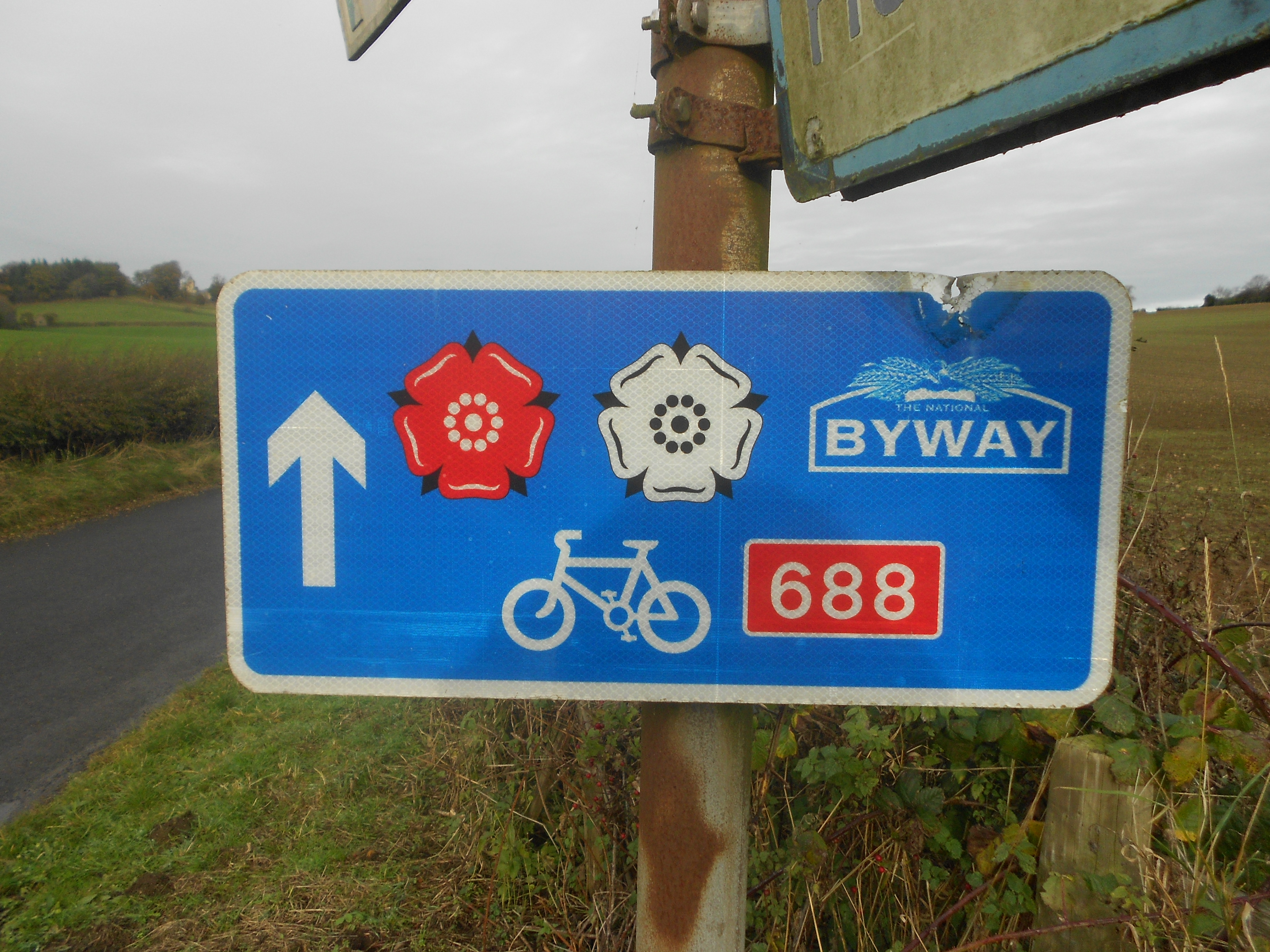
- A typical Route 688 sign showing the Way of the Roses red and white roses, a direction arrow and route number
- Length: 55 mi (89 km)
- Location: Yorkshire, United Kingdom
- Established: 2010
- Designation: UK National Cycle Network
- Trailheads: Winterburn (west); 54.0226°N 2.1025°W; Linton-on-Ouse (east); 54.0387°N 1.2351°W
- Use: Cycling
- Highest point: Greenhow, 404 m (1,325 ft)
- Lowest point: Linton-on-Ouse, 16 m (52 ft)
- Difficulty: Hard
- Waymark
- Surface: On-road

National Cycle Network (NCN) Route 688 is a Sustrans National Route that runs from Winterburn to Linton-on-Ouse. It is 55 miles (89 km), fully open and signed.

== History ==
Route 688 was created as an integral part of the Way of the Roses coast-to-coast route between Morecambe and Bridlington which opened on 11 September 2010.

== Route ==
The western trailhead is at Winterburn (54.0226°N 2.1025°W), in the Yorkshire Dales, where it meets Route 68, the Pennine Cycle Way. It passes through Cracoe and Burnsall before climbing to the routes high point at Greenhow followed by a steep descent into Pateley Bridge. A further climb to Brimham Rocks is followed by a gradual descent on to the Vale of York via Fountains Abbey and Ripon. From here the route is flat as it follows the River Ouse via Boroughbridge and crossing it at Aldwark Bridge. The eastern trail head is at a junction with Route 65 at Linton-on-Ouse (54.0387°N 1.2351°W).

== Related NCN routes ==
Route 688 is part of the Way of the Roses along with:

- 69
- 68
- 65
- 658
- 66
- 164
- 1

Route 688 meets the following routes:

- Route 68 at Winterburn (54.0226°N 2.1025°W),
- Route 67 near Fountains Abbey (54.0914°N 1.5771°W).
- Route 65 at Linton-on-Ouse (54.0387°N 1.2351°W).
