= National Cycle Route 665 =

Cycle route in the United Kingdom

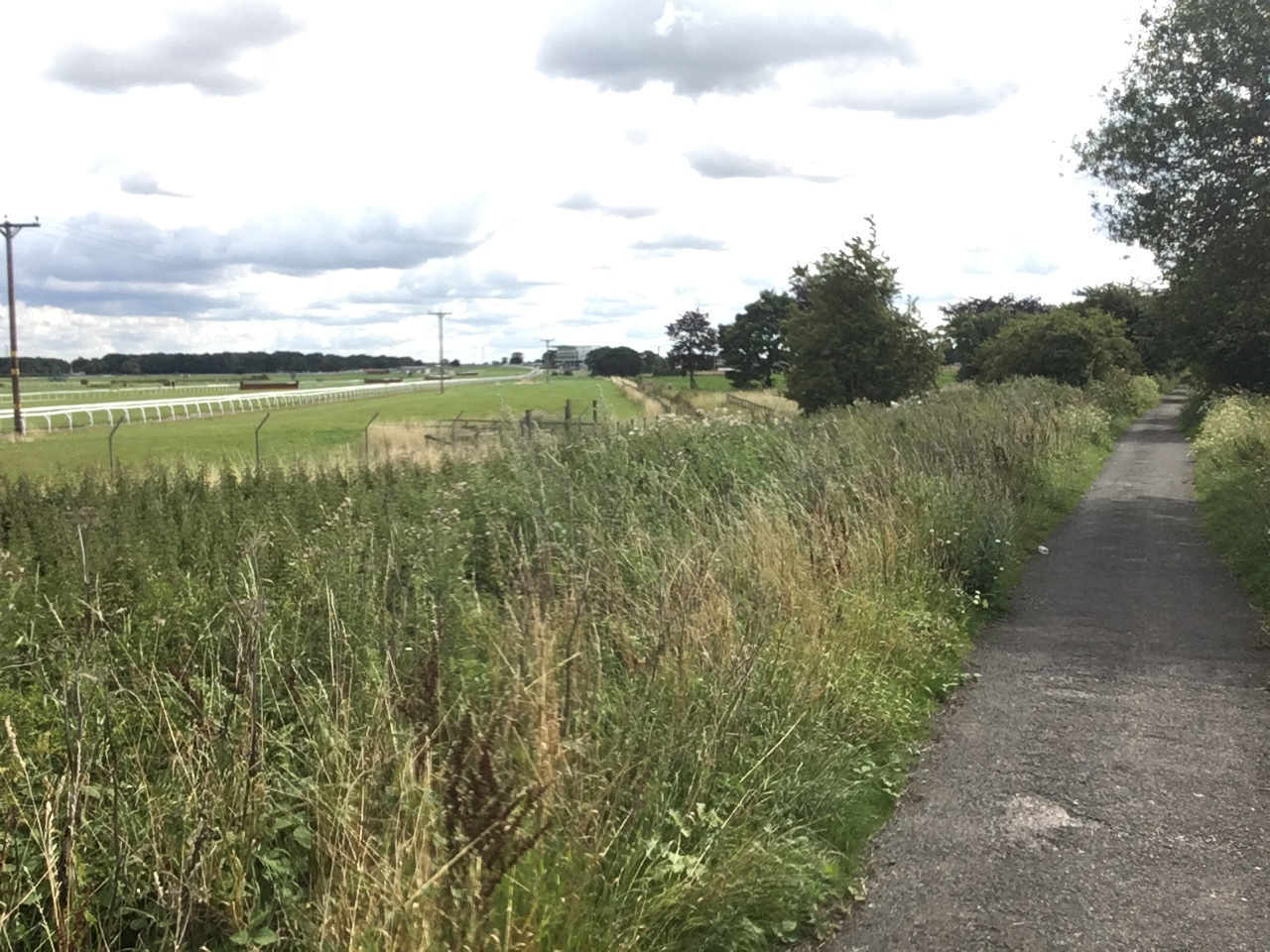
Wetherby Racecourse from Route 665

National Cycle Network (NCN) Route 665 is a Sustrans route from Wetherby to South West York. Two sections of the route are open. As of summer 2020 the route is not fully signed. The central section between Tadcaster and Newton Kyme is still a proposal.

== Route ==
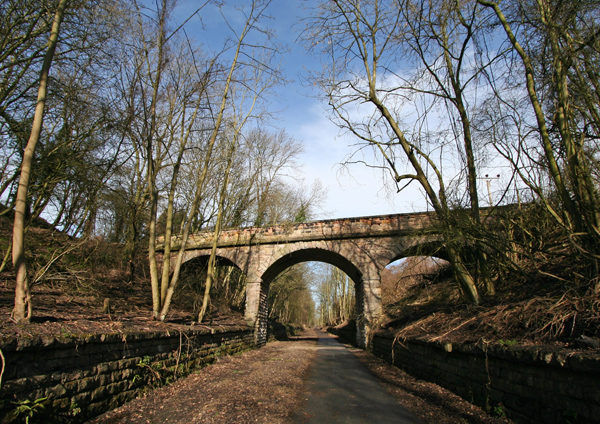
Thorpe Arch Railway Cutting

=== Wetherby to Newton Kyme ===
Starting on Linton Road Wetherby the route is a railway path before it goes through a housing estate and uses an underpass to cross the A1(M). There is a rail path from there to Thorpe Arch Estate. When opened in 2007, at a cost of £500,00, this section was numbered as Route 66, it is now fully signed as Route 665. The old railway viaduct over the River Wharfe was reopened as a cycle path in 2018, this formed a new section of the route from the trading estate to the A659 at Newton Kyme. A 500 metre cycle path through the trading estate was installed in spring 2020 to fill the gap in the route which had been left when the Wharfe crossing opened.

=== Newton Kyme to Tadcaster ===
As of summer 2020 this route is still a proposal. The planned route follows the A659 to Tadcaster.

=== Tadcaster to York ===
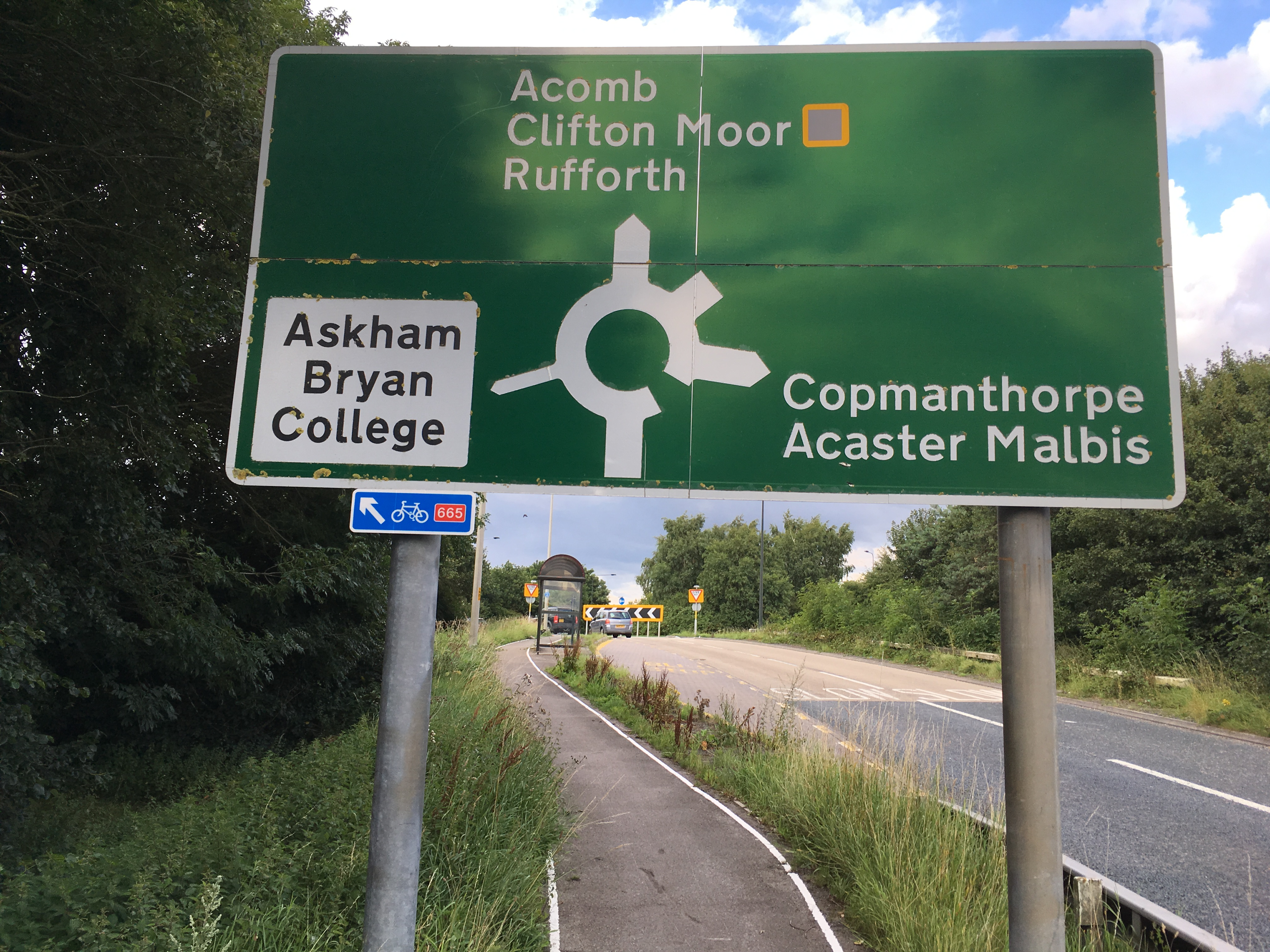
Route 665 sign at A64-A1237 junction, Copmanthorpe

The route uses a longstanding verge-side cycle-path next to the A64. NCN 665 ends where it meets Route 65 at Askham Bar Park and Ride site. This section of the route is mainly unsigned.

This section is paralleled to the south by NCN 66, which follows quiet country lanes.

== Related Routes ==
Route 65 meets the following routes:

- 65 at Askham Bar, York 53.9253°N 1.1126°W
- 66 at Tadcaster 53.8871°N 1.2575°W
- 67 at Wetherby 53.933°N 1.3786°W
