= National Cycle Route 62 =

Long distance cycle route from Fleetwood to Selby, England

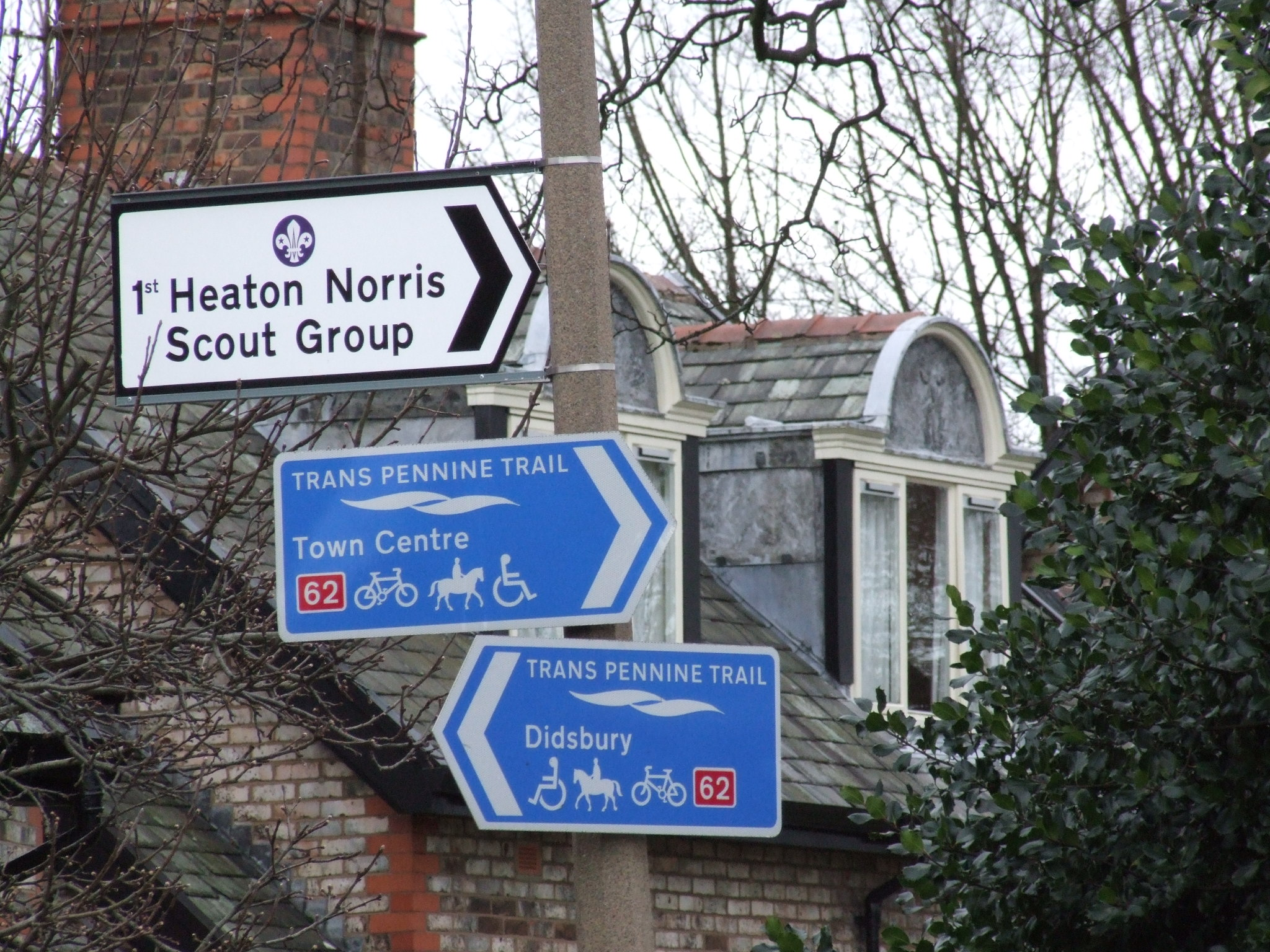
Road signs in Stockport referring to the Trail.

National Cycle Network (NCN) Route 62 is a Sustrans National Route that runs from Fleetwood to Selby. As of 2018 the route has a missing section between Preston and Southport but is otherwise open and signed.

== History ==
Much of route 62 was created as part of the Trans Pennine Trail, a long-distance path running from coast to coast across Northern England. It forms part of European walking route E8. It was given the route number 62 in reference to the M62 motorway which it running parallel to between Liverpool and Selby.

== Route ==
=== Fleetwood to Hutton ===
The western trailhead is in Fleetwood. The route follows the coast on traffic-free paths to Lytham St Annes via Blackpool. From Lytham, the route follows minor roads to the western outskirts of Preston. Passing through the city centre the route reaches Hutton. From here to the northern edge of Southport the route has yet to be determined.

=== Southport to Stockport ===
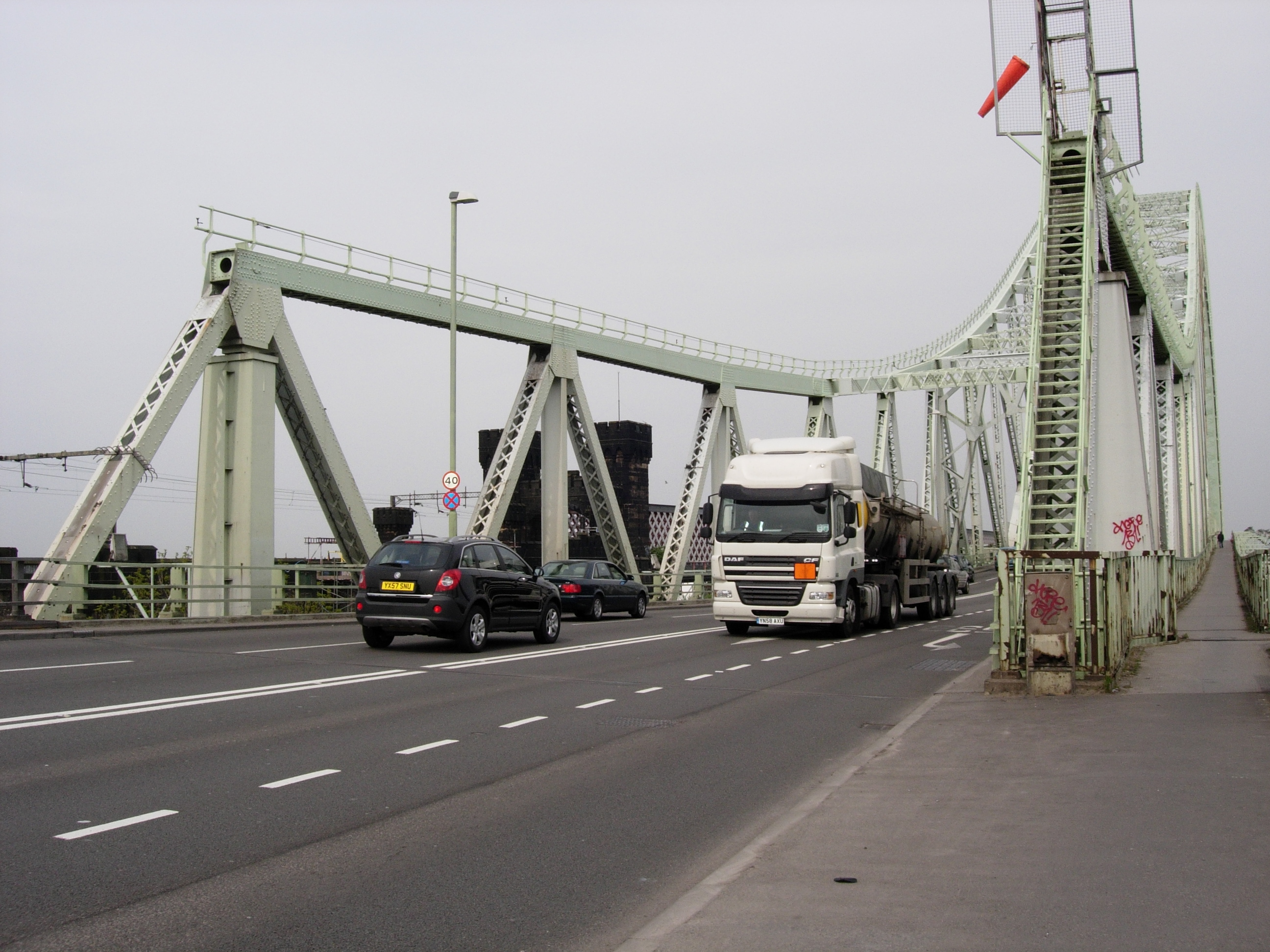
Silver Jubilee Bridge NCN 62, Runcorn

From Southport to Widnes the route is extensively traffic-free. It is mainly made up of old railway lines including the Liverpool Loop Line through the city's eastern suburbs. Continuing on canals and old railway lines between Widnes and Altrincham. The route then follows the River Mersey though Manchester southern suburbs to reach Stockport.

=== Stockport to Selby ===
Route 62 continues from Stockport on a mixture of traffic-free and on-road routes. From Hadfield it crosses the Peak District, heading up the Longdendale valley via the Longdendale Trail to Woodhead, then down through Dunford Bridge, Penistone and Doncaster. The eastern trailhead is in Selby where it meets Route 65.

== Local routes and trails ==
Several sections of Route 62 are signed as local routes or trails. These include:

- Longdendale Trail
- Liverpool Loop Line
- Slow Tour of Yorkshire Stage 14: Barnsley to Old Moor RSPB Reserve
- Slow Tour of Yorkshire Stage 15: Penistone to Dunford Bridge
- Slow Tour of Yorkshire Stage 17: Doncaster to Conisbrough

== Related NCN routes ==
Route 62 meets the following routes:

- Route 622 at Preston
- Route 6 at Preston and Reddish Vale
- Route 55 at Preston, East Didsbury and Stockport
- Route 56 at Liverpool
- Route 82 at Widness and Stretford
- Route 85 at West Didsbury
- Route 558 at Stockport
- Route 68 at Charlesworth and Dunford Bridge
- Route 627 at Millhouse and Green Oxspring
- Route 67 at Barnsley and Brampton
- Route 65 at Selby

Route 62 is part of the Trans Pennine Trail (east) along with Route 65.

Route 62 is part of the Pennine Cycleway along with Route 68.
