= National Cycle Route 6 =

National Cycle Network route between London and the Lake District

National Cycle Route 6 (or NCR 6) is a route of the United Kingdom National Cycle Network, running from London to the Lake District.

== Route ==
Parts of the route are currently incomplete and some sections follow other routes.

=== London to Milton Keynes ===
- Uxbridge
- Watford
- St Albans
- Harpenden
- Luton
- Milton Keynes

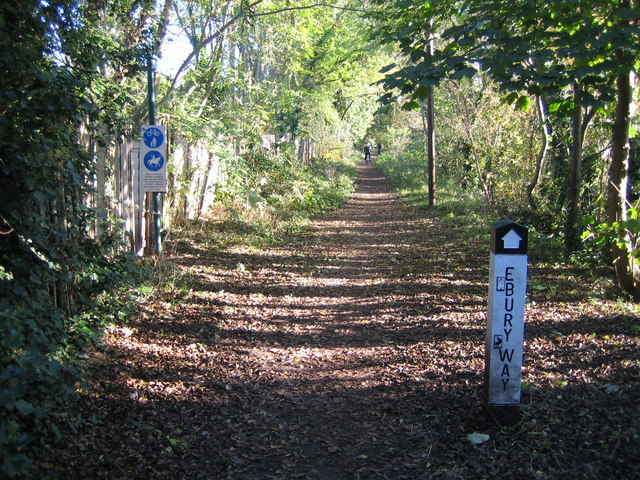
the Ebury Way just outside Rickmansworth

The proposed route is to begin in central London, running from Charing Cross via Paddington railway station to the Grand Union Canal. The towpath alongside the canal between Paddington and Northolt is already designated as a local cycle path, and will eventually form part of Route 6 when the route is completed. The canal continues to Uxbridge where the National Cycle Route 6 joins National Cycle Route 61 at Cowley, near Brunel University, sharing the same path until the two routes diverge at St Albans. The route continues along the Grand Union Canal and the Colne Valley on mainly traffic-free routes. At Rickmansworth it joins the Ebury Way, a rail trail which runs along a former line of the Watford and Rickmansworth Railway. Entering central Watford, the route continues north via St Albans with some on-road sections to Harpenden, where it intersects with National Cycle Route 57 and the Chiltern Cycleway. It then progresses along the River Lea via Luton, along the Sewell Greenway before joining the road network to reach Leighton Buzzard. At this point it re-joins the Grand Union Canal (Grand Junction Branch) to Milton Keynes.

==== Milton Keynes ====
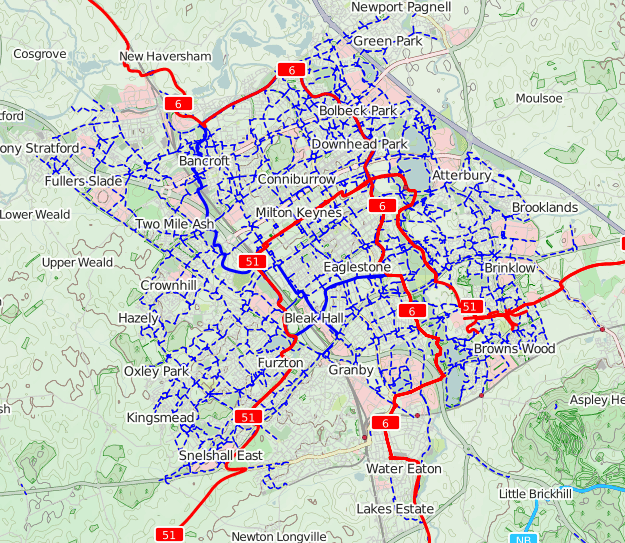
The Milton Keynes cycleway network. NCR routes 6 and 51 are highlighted in red. (Openstreetmap.org)

Route 6 enters Milton Keynes from the south following the Grand Union Canal through southern Bletchley. After a loop through central Bletchley close to Bletchley railway station and Bletchley Park, it resumes its track northwards via Fenny Stratford along the valley of the River Ouzel (near The Open University and the Milton Keynes University Hospital) to Campbell Park (where it intersects National Cycle Route 51 heading west to Central Milton Keynes and Milton Keynes Central railway station). At Great Linford, NCR6 heads west along the former Wolverton to Newport Pagnell Line (now a rail trail). At Old Wolverton (near Wolverton railway station), the route crosses the River Great Ouse to leave the Milton Keynes Urban Area for the rural villages of Castlethorpe and Hanslope before crossing into Northamptonshire.

=== Milton Keynes to Derby ===
- Milton Keynes
- Northampton
- Market Harborough
- Leicester
- Loughborough
- Derby

Route 6 between Milton Keynes and Derby is the core section of the Sustrans route of the South Midlands. After passing through Northampton the route follows the Brampton Valley Way for 14 miles (23 km) to Market Harborough, first opened in 1993 it is one of the longest railway paths in the country and uses two long tunnels. From Market Harborough the route uses the towpath of the Grand Union Canal to reach Foxton Locks from where it is on street to south Leicester. Using the River Soar towpath the route passes south to north through the city. On reaching Watermead Country Park the route returns to the streets to pass through Loughborough and on to Worthington. From here the 13 miles (21 km) to Derby follow the Cloud Trail and Derby Canal Path.

=== Derby to Castleton ===
- Derby
- Nottingham
- Worksop
- Rotherham
- Sheffield
- Castleton

From Derby the route heads east through Long Eaton and then turns north in the western suburbs of Nottingham. Passing Beeston, Bulwell, Hucknall and Newstead railway stations before heading northeast through the grounds of Newstead Abbey. From Blidworth the route is northbound and predominantly traffic free as far as Worksop as it passes through Sherwood Pines Forest Park, Sherwood Forest Country Park and Clumber Park. Using the canal towpath between Worksop and Shireoaks the route heads east on country roads to the Rother Valley Country Park. Here it turns north to Rotherham, from where it becomes traffic free joining a towpath for a southwesterly route to Sheffield. Climbing through the streets of Sheffield the route enters the Peak District National Park at Ringinglow and uses the dam wall of Ladybower reservoir to reach Castleton.

=== Castleton to Reddish ===
Castleton | Reddish

The route between Castleton and Reddish has yet to be decided.

=== Reddish to Preston via Manchester ===
- Reddish
- Fallowfield
- Whalley Range
- Manchester
- Bury
- Preston

From Reddish, National Route 6 enters Manchester via the Fallowfield Loop. Passing through Whalley Range and Manchester city centre it then follows part of the Irwell Sculpture Trail as it runs through Drinkwater Park and north towards Bury, following old railways through Radcliffe.

North of Bury the old railway to Tottington is followed and then on road to Ramsbottom. There are then old railway and road sections through Haslingden and Accrington where route 6 joins the towpath of the Leeds and Liverpool Canal. This takes the cycle path into Blackburn. The route then goes through the city to Witton Country Park. This section ends at Pleasington Station.

There is no signed route between Pleasington and Preston.

=== Preston to Keswick ===
- Preston
- Kendal
- Keswick

NCN6 heads north east out of Preston and then via country lanes north to Galgate and then west to near Glasson Dock. An old railway line and off-road cycle paths lead to Lancaster. The Lune Millennium Bridge takes the route over the River Lune. Route 6 then follows the towpath of the Lancaster Canal to Carnforth. Country lanes lead the route via Milnthorpe to Kendal.

North of Kendal more country lanes lead to Staveley and then a cycle path alongside the busy A591 trunk road to the outskirts of Windermere. A busy road down to Bowness on Windermere is followed by a short off-road path to the car ferry across Windermere to the west side of the lake.

Gravel surfaced tracks and paths up the west side of Windermere via Wray Castle bring the cyclist to Ambleside. Here route 6 then takes the back road and off-road gravel cycle paths next to the River Rothay via Rydal Water and Grasmere to Grasmere village.

Unsigned country lanes north of the village can be used to reach Town Head on the A591, the major trunk road through the Lake District. There is a two mile gap here before NCN6 restarts at Dunmail Raise.

From Dunmail Raise there is an off-road path to the quiet road around the west side of Thirlmere. The route crosses the A591 at Legburthwaite and then is on road along the B5322 to Threlkeld, where route 6 ends at a T junction with route 71. To reach Keswick the suggested route is to turn west at Wanthwaite Bridge and follow lanes via Castlerigg Stone Circle and then down into Keswick at Chestnut Hill. A flatter but longer route is to head north to Threlked and then follow route 71 using the old railway through the scenic River Greta gorge to the old Keswick railway station and thence the town centre.

== Related NCN routes ==
Route 6 meets the following routes:

- 61 at Uxbridge and St Albans
- 57 at Harpenden
- 547 at Sewell
- 51 at Milton Keynes
- 64 at Market Harborough
- 50 at Willoughby Waterleys
- 63 at Leicester
- 15 at Belton
- 52 at Osgathorpe
- 54 at Derby
- 67 at Long Eaton, Rother Valley Country Park and Meadowhall
- 645 at Sherwood Pines Forest Park
- 648 at Sherwood Forest
- 647 at Clumber Park
- 627 at Sheffield
- 62 at Reddish Vale and Preston
- 55 at Salford and Preston
- 622 at Preston
- 700 at Conder Green and Milnthorpe
- 69 at Lancaster and Hest Bank
- 70 at Sedgwick and Natland
- 637 at Clappersgate
- 71 at Threlkeld

Route 6 between Derby and Sheffield is part of the Derby to York cycle route along with:

- 62
- 67
- 65

Route 6 between Sheffield and Rother Valley is part of the Trans Pennine Trail (Central) along with:

- 62
- 67
- 627
