= National Cycle Route 658 =

Cycling route in York, England

NCN Route 658
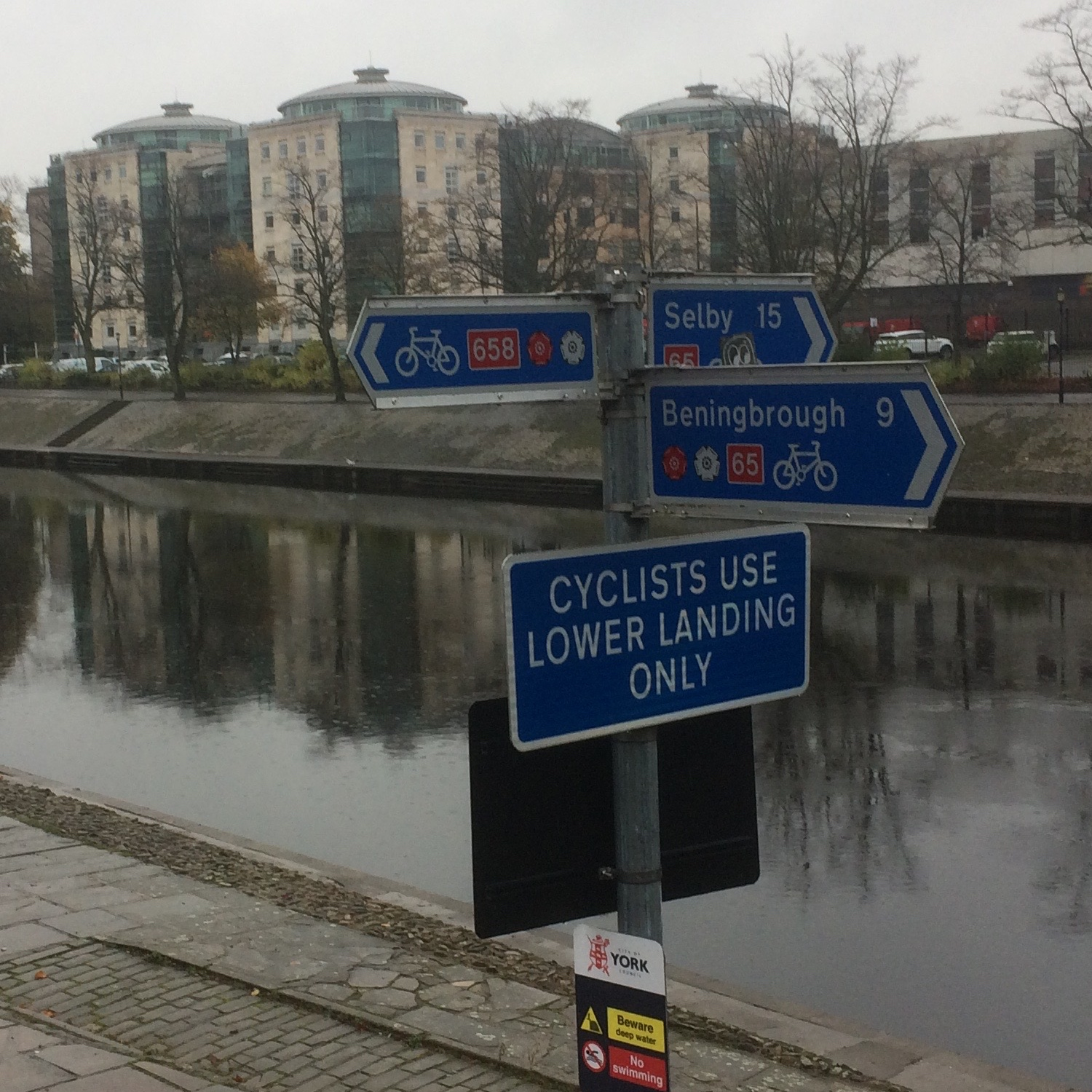
- Way of the Roses signpost at the start of route 658 on the bank of the River Ouse in York
- Length: 3.97 kilometre
- Designation: UK National Cycle Network
- Trailheads: York, Tang Hall
- Use: Cycling
- Waymark
- Website: sustrans.org.uk

Trail map
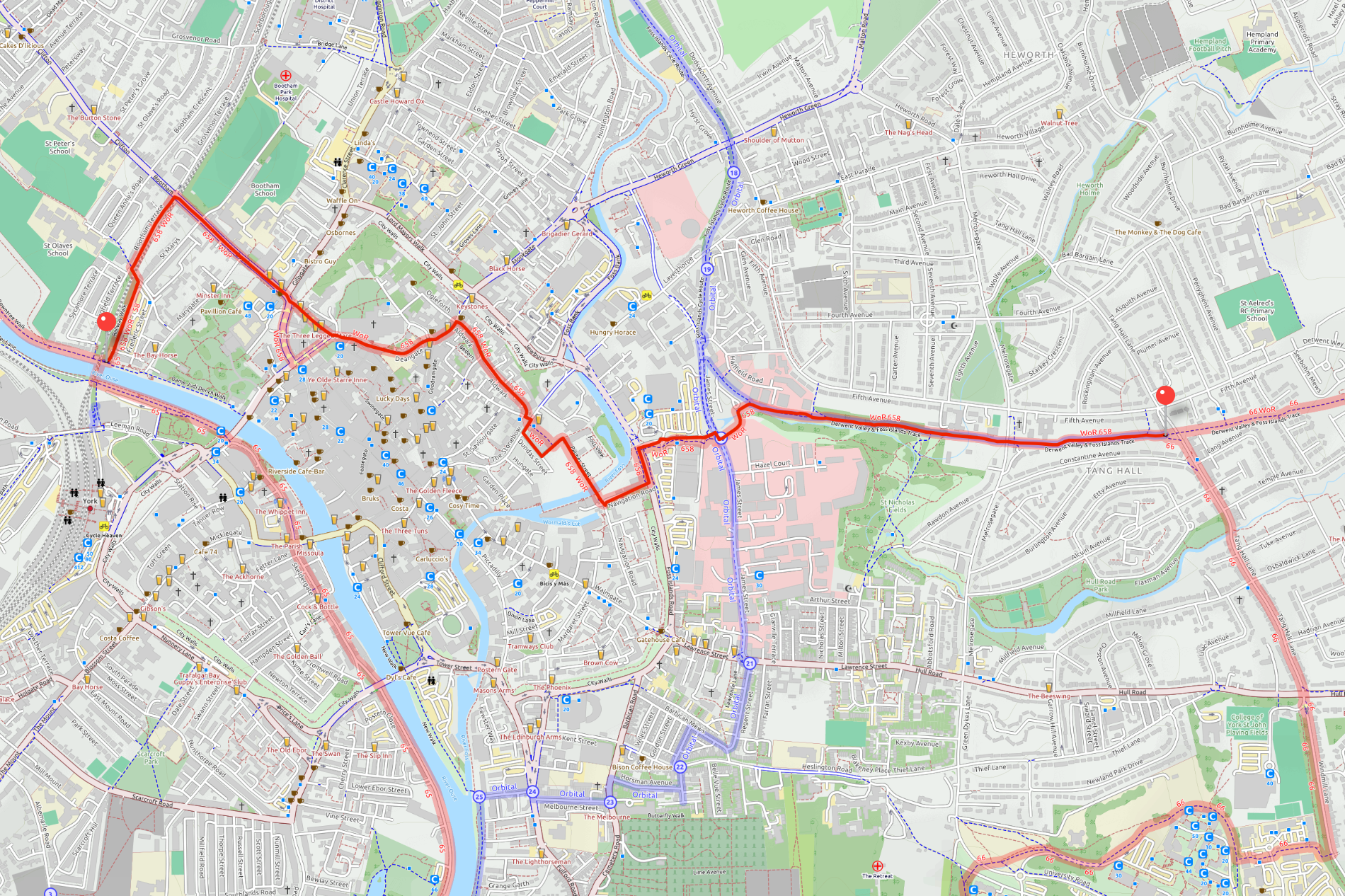
- Map of the NCN Route 658 through York, England

National Cycle Network (NCN) Route 658 is a Sustrans Regional Route. It is two miles (3.2 km) long, and provides a connection between Route 65 and Route 66 through York city centre. The full length of the route is part of the Way of the Roses. It is fully signed and open.

== Route ==
NCN 658 starts at Scarborough Bridge on the west bank of the River Ouse. It runs up Marygate and Bootham, then passes through the historic city walls at Bootham Bar. It passes York Minster, the Merchant Taylors' Hall and Monk Bar before crossing the River Foss. It leaves the city centre on the Foss Islands Cycle track. The route ends at Tang Hall Lane where it meets NCN 66. Much of the route is traffic free.

== History ==
The Foss Islands Cycle track runs along the former Derwent Valley Light Railway. Sections of NCN 658 were originally signed as NCN 66. The route was altered and renumbered during the creation of Way of the Roses Challenge Route.

Prior to the opening of the York bypass in 1976, the A64(T) passed through central York. NCN 658 follows the old A64 route between the Minster and Monk Bar, part of which is now traffic-free.

== Related NCN Routes ==
Route 658 meets the following routes:

- National Cycle Route 65, National Cycle Route 66

Route 658 is part of the Way of the Roses along with:

- 69
- 68
- 688
- 65
- 66
- 164
- 1
