= National Cycle Route 656 =

Cycle route in Yorkshire, England

NCN Route 656
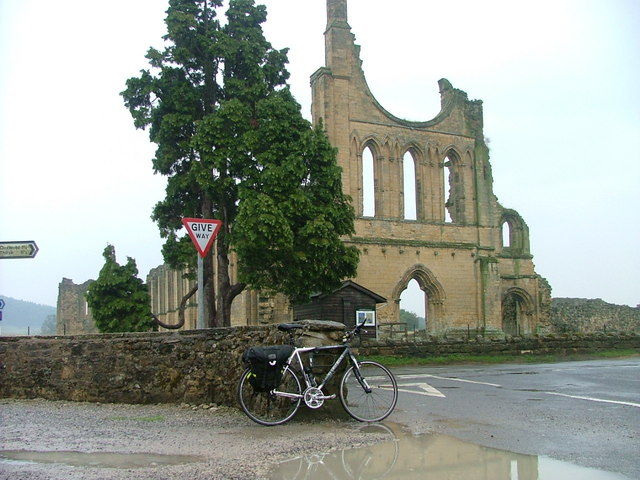
- Byland Abbey
- Length: 30 km (19 mi)
- Location: North Yorkshire, UK
- Established: 1998
- Designation: UK National Cycle Network
- Trailheads: Coxwold (south) to Osmotherley (north)
- Use: Cycling
- Elevation gain/loss: 569 metres (1,870 ft) gain
- Highest point: Sutton Bank, 308 m (1,010 ft)
- Lowest point: 66 m (217 ft)
- Difficulty: Very Strenuous
- Waymark
- Website: http://www.sustrans.org.uk/ncn/map/route/route-656

National Cycle Network (NCN) Route 656 is a Sustrans regional route in North Yorkshire. A 18.5 miles (29.8 km) cycle way between Coxwold and a junction with NCN Route 65 near Osmotherley via Sutton Bank National Park Centre and Hawnby. The route is fully opened and signed, it is on-road using quiet country lanes. Sustrans describe it as “a very strenuous route.”

Prior to 2009 the route had been signed as part of NCN 65. Up until then it had been described as the High Level route on the Hull to Middlesbrough White Rose cycle route.

== Route ==
The southern end of Route 656 is in Coxwold 54°11′14.35″N 1°10′52.22″W at a Junction with Route 65. Near the village of Kilburn the route climbs steeply up Sutton Bank. It then follows the line of an old Drovers' road before descending steeply into Hawnby. There are further climbs from there to the northern end at a junction with 65 54°21′23.36″N 1°15′49.94″W.

== History ==
The route was established in 1998 as part of the White Rose cycle route. It was signed as a branch of Route 65. The White Roses cycle route is no longer promoted and the signs have been updated by the addition of route 656 stickers.

== Related NCN Routes ==
- Route 65
- Route 657
