= National Cycle Route 657 =

Cycle route in England

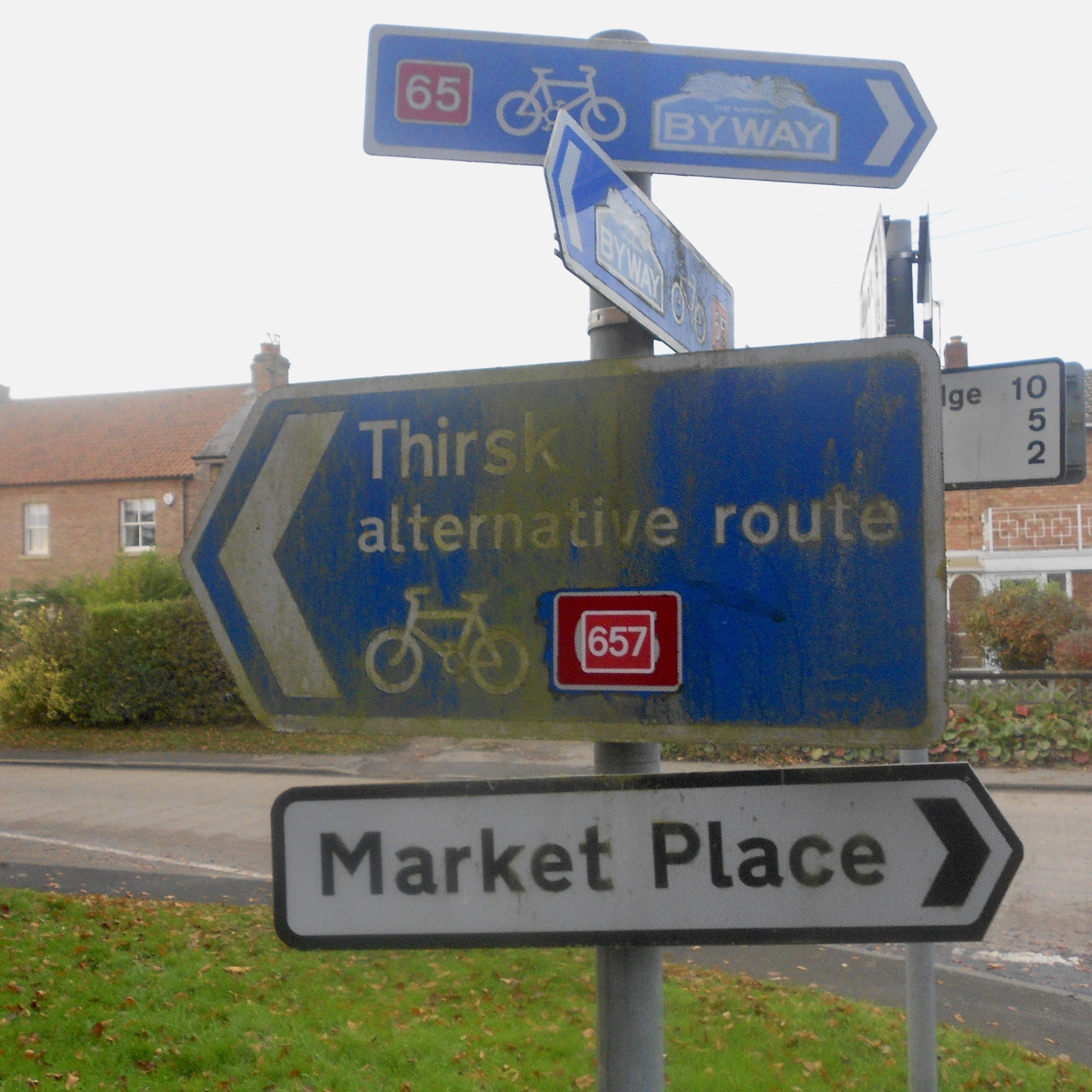
National Cycle Network signpost at the southern end of Route 657 where it meets Route 65 in Easingwold, North Yorkshire.

National Cycle Network (NCN) Route 657 is a loop of the White Rose cycle route, NCN 65. It branches off the main route to connect the town of Thirsk to the National Cycle Network. Prior to 2009 the route had been signed as part of NCN 65.

The combination of NCN 657 and a section of NCN 65 creates a circular route from Thirsk to Kirkby Knowle to Coxwold to Easingwold and returning to Thirsk.

== Route ==
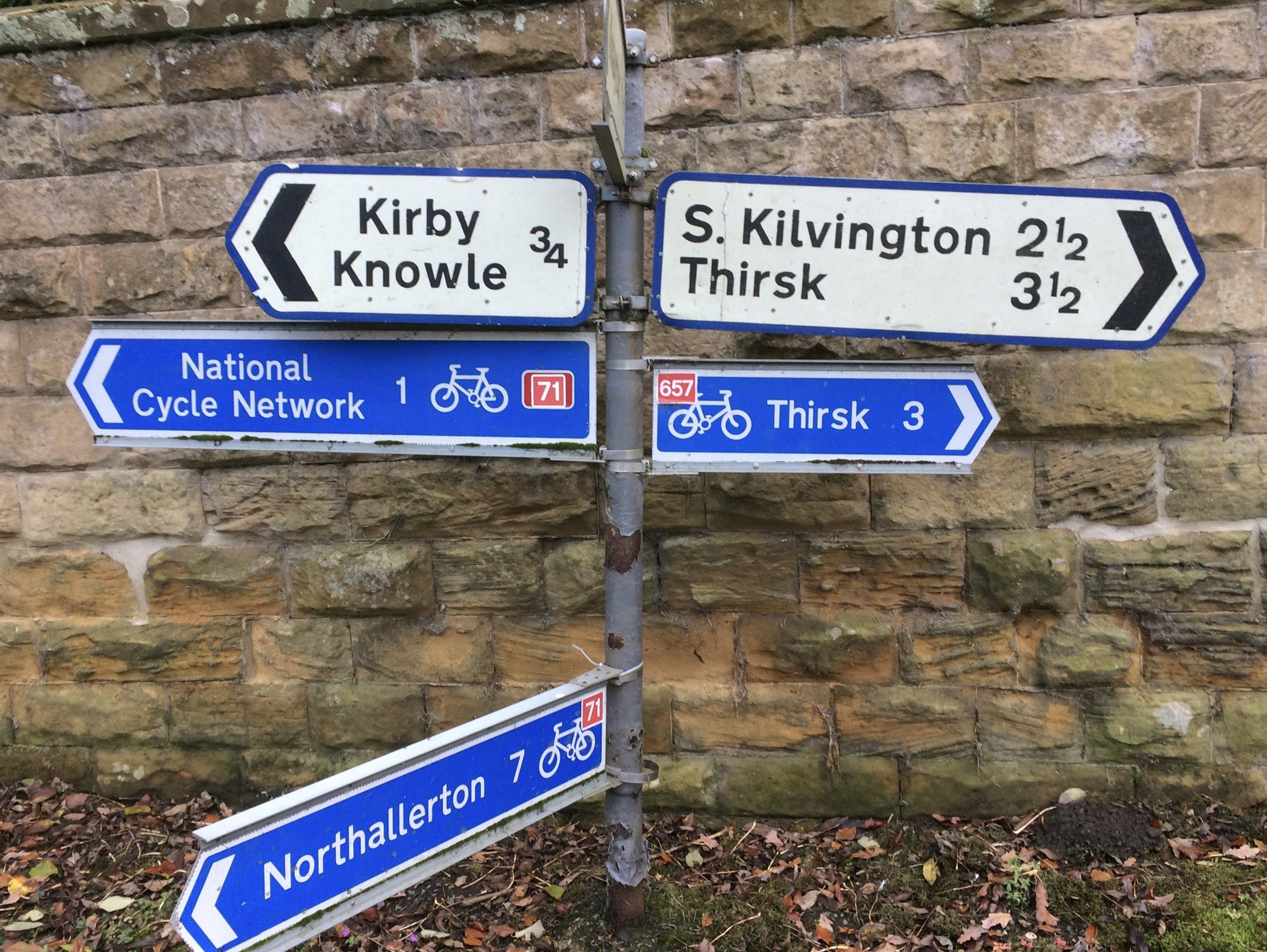
National Cycle Network signpost at the northern end of Route 657 where it meets Route 71 in Upsall, North Yorkshire.

The southern end of 657 is in Easingwold. It branches off NCN 65 on the outskirts of the town in the direction of York. It takes an indirect route via quiet roads in the Vale of York to Thirsk.

The path north out of Thirsk contains the routes only traffic free section, a dual use pavement alongside the A61. The northern section of NCN 657 from Thirsk to Upsall is made up of quiet country lanes though rolling countryside. The northern end of NCN 657 is in the village of Upsall. Here the route joins NCN 71, 8 miles south of Northallerton. The main route of the White Rose Cycle Route, NCN 65 is a mile (1.5 km) east of the end of NCN 657 along NCN 71 at Kirby Knowle.

Thirsk railway station is approximately 1 mile from the route.

== History ==
The route was created as part of the White Rose cycle route. It was signed as a branch of Route 65. The White Roses cycle route is no longer promoted and the signs have been updated by the addition of route 657 stickers.

== Related NCN routes ==
- Route 65
- Route 71
- Route 656
