= National Cycle Route 65 =

Long-distance cycle route through East and North Yorkshire, England

NCN Route 65
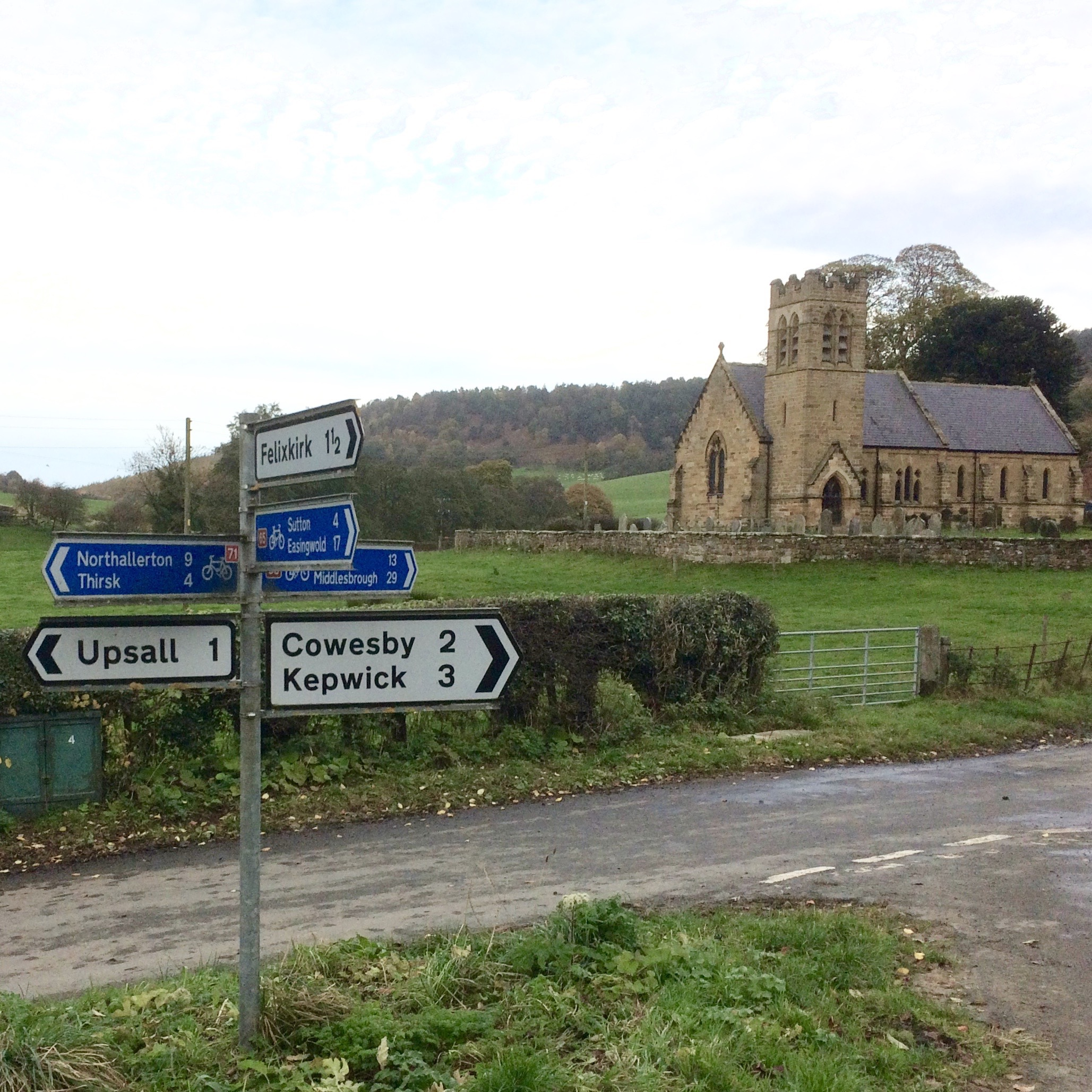
- National Cycle Network signpost in Kirby Knowle, North Yorkshire.
- Length: 214 km (133 mi)
- Location: Yorkshire, UK
- Established: 1998
- Designation: UK National Cycle Network
- Trailheads: Hornsea (south) to Middlesbrough (north)
- Use: Cycling
- Highest point: Silton Forest, 305 m (1,001 ft)
- Lowest point: Hornsea, 0 m (0 ft)
- Difficulty: Moderate
- Waymark
- Website: Official website

Trail map
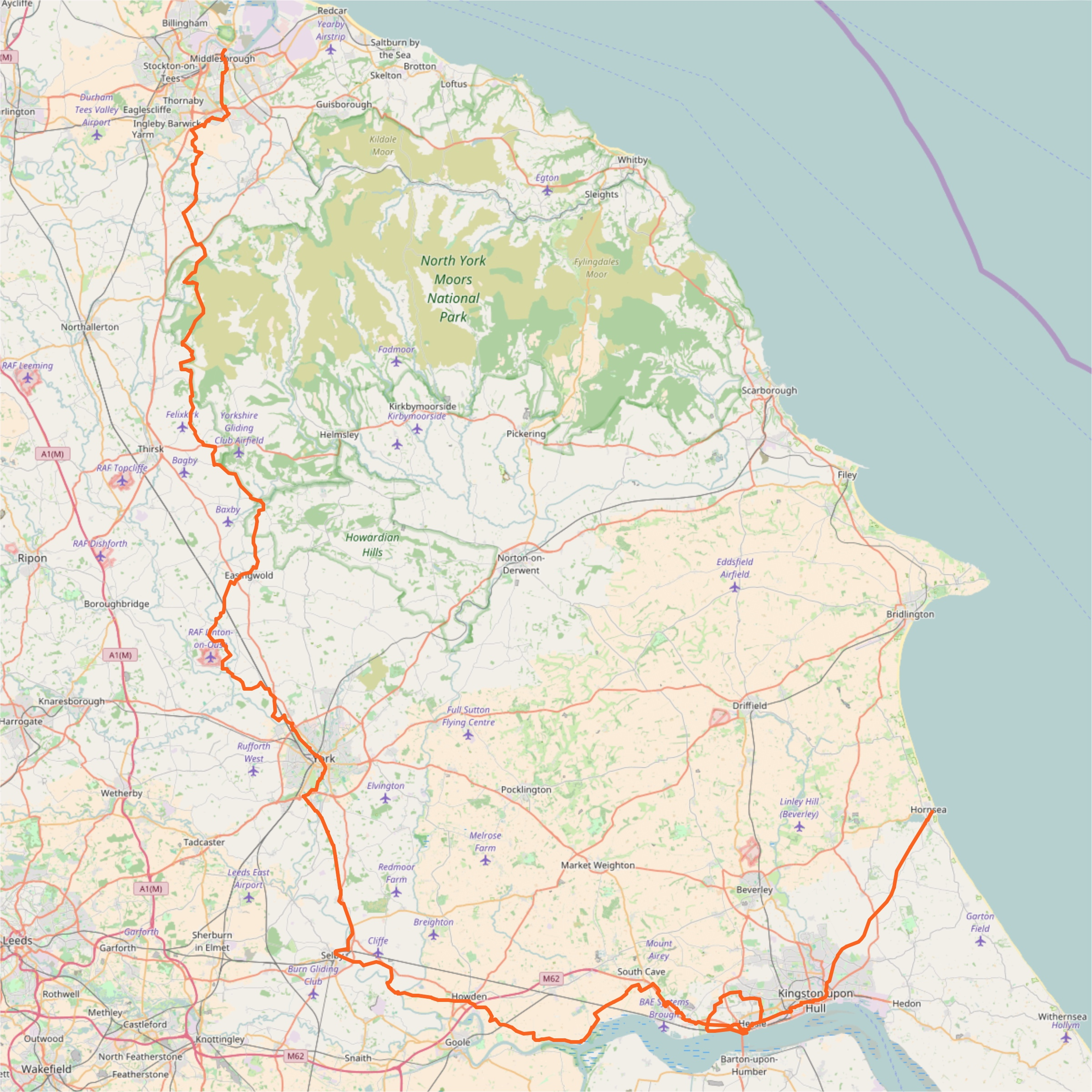
- NCN Route 65 from OpenStreetMap.

National Cycle Network (NCN) Route 65 is a Sustrans National Route that runs from Hornsea, on the North Sea coast in the East Riding of Yorkshire, via Hull and York, to Middlesbrough. It is fully open and signed.

Between Hornsea and York it forms the eastern end of the Trans Pennine Trail. The section between York and Linton-on-Ouse is part of the Way of the Roses. In 1998 the route between Hull and Middlesbrough was branded the White Rose cycle route. This branding is no longer in use.

== Route ==
=== Hornsea to Hull ===
This part of the route runs almost entirely along the dismantled trackbed of the Hull and Hornsea Railway and is known as the Hornsea Rail Trail. The path takes a straight route over the flat Holderness plain and is 15 miles (24 km) in length.

=== Hull to York ===
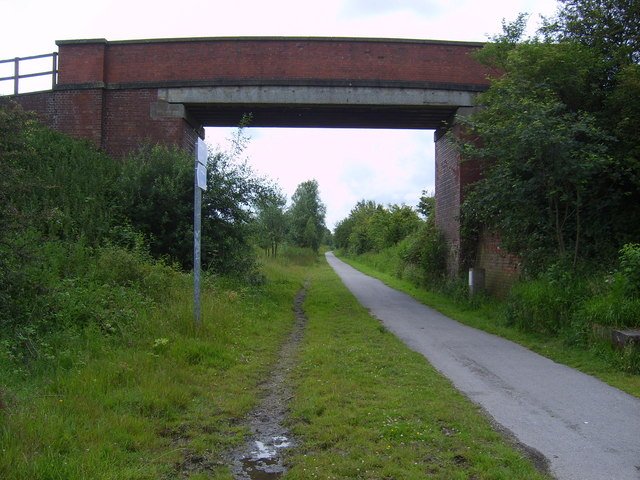
Cycle route on former ECML route between Escrick and Naburn

Route 65 avoids the Yorkshire Wolds by running along the banks of the Humber Estuary, passing under the Humber Bridge. A very flat route, there is a small climb at Welton. Mainly on quiet country lanes as far as Selby, there are several short traffic-free sections. From Selby to York the route uses the trackbed of the old East Coast Mainline railway, which was bought by Sustrans for £1 and turned into one of its first traffic-free paths. On a 10 kilometres (6.2 mi) section of this path is a scale model of the Solar System.

NCN Route 66 provides an alternative route between Hull and York.

=== York to Middlesbrough ===
Following a traffic-free route out of York, the rest of the route is almost entirely on quiet country lanes. North of York, NCN 65 passes Beningbrough Hall. There are two routes here, the path through the National Trust grounds is one-way, so the northbound path is routed around the perimeter. At Easingwold, Route 65 leaves the flat for the first time as it approaches the North York Moors. Running along the foothills there are several short steep climbs/descents. The route climbs over the North Western edge of the North York Moors, passing to the east of Osmotherley. Its high point is reached via a long steep climb up a forestry commission path. The route in Middlesbrough is mainly traffic free.

Route 65 forms part of the Way of the Roses Challenge route between York (junction with NCN 658) and Linton-on-Ouse (junction with NCN 688).

== Developments ==
The route through York was improved in April 2019 with the Scarborough Bridge improvements. The steep steps and narrow deck have been replaced by ramps and a 3.7m wide path.

== History ==
The original route north of York consisted of three branches all numbered as Route 65. In 2009 Sustrans introduced 3 digit numbers for shorter local routes and two of the three branches of Route 65 were renumbered. The Thirsk branch became Route 657 and the High Level Option is now Route 656. The Low Level Option remains as Route 65.

== Millennium Mileposts ==
There are over 1,000 mileposts on the National Cycle Network. A number of the mileposts are located on Route 65.

Sustrans ID	Milepost Type	Location	coordinates	Photo
MP5	Mills	York to Beningbrough path	53.99325°N 1.1386°W	MP5
MP96	Mills	Selby	53.7893°N 1.0464°W	
MP97	Mills	Riccall Mound	53.8404°N 1.0562°W	MP97
MP98	Mills	Bishopthorpe	53.9179°N 1.1015°W	MP98
MP99	Mills	Terry's mound (York Racecourse)	53.9394°N 1.0901°W	MP99
MP114	Mills	Youlton	54.0636°N 1.245°W	MP114
MP180	Mills	Silton Woods, North Yorkshire	54.3403°N 1.2799°W	MP180
MP181	Mills	Codbeck, Osmotherley, N Yorks	54.3784°N 1.2737°W	
MP207	Mills	Millfields, Easingwold	54.1254°N 1.1902°W	MP207
MP445	Mills	Hull	53.7435°N 0.3398°W	
MP664	McColl	Barmby on the Marsh	53.7492°N 0.9661°W	

== Related NCN routes ==
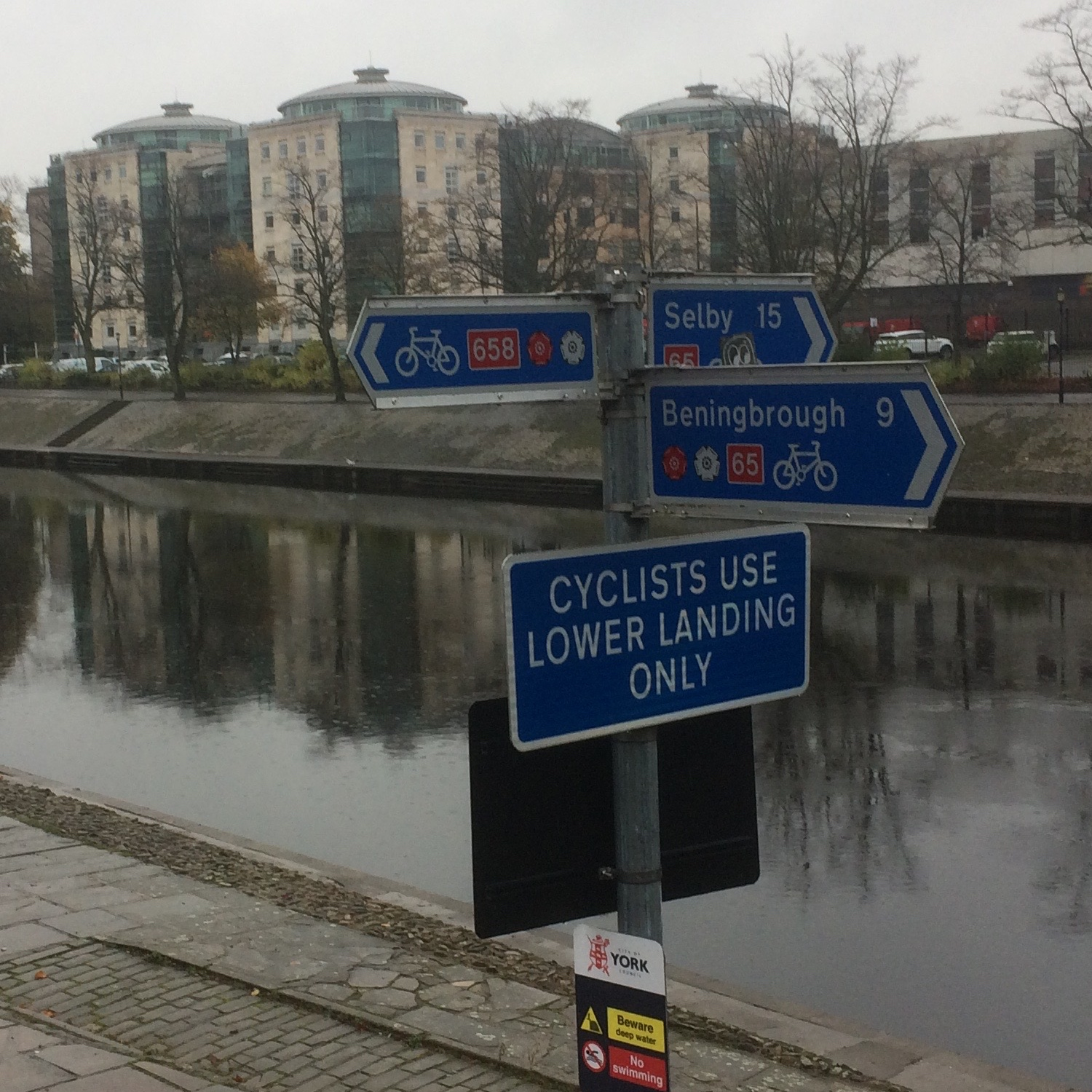
Way of the Roses signpost at the junction of routes 65 and 658 on the bank of the River Ouse in York

Route 65 meets the following routes:

- Route 1 at Hessle 53°43′0.58″N 0°26′49.73″W and Middlesbrough 54°35′0.12″N 1°13′51.76″W
- Route 62 at Selby 53°47′6.79″N 1°3′50.5″W
- Route 66 at Hull 53°45′32.93″N 0°19′22.03″W and York 53°56′43.73″N 1°4′59.22″W
- Route 71 at Kirky Knowle 54°16′42.23″N 1°16′58.64″W
- Route 165 at Hutton Rudby 54°27′2.44″N 1°16′32.62″W
- Route 656 at Coxwold 54°11′14.35″N 1°10′52.22″W and Osmotherley 54°21′23.36″N 1°15′49.94″W
- Route 657 at Easingwold 54°7′19.37″N 1°12′17.08″W and Kirkby Knowle 54°16′42.23″N 1°16′58.64″W
- Route 658 at York 53°57′41.24″N 1°5′32.72″W
- Route 665 at York 53°55′44.13″N 1°6′59.11″W
- Route 688 at Linton-on-Ouse 54°2′19.24″N 1°14′6.18″W

Route 65 is part of the Way of the Roses along with:

- 69
- 68
- 688
- 658
- 66
- 164
- 1

Route 65 is part of the Trans Pennine Trail (East) along with Route 62
