= National Cycle Route 67 =

Long distance cycle route in England

NCN Route 67
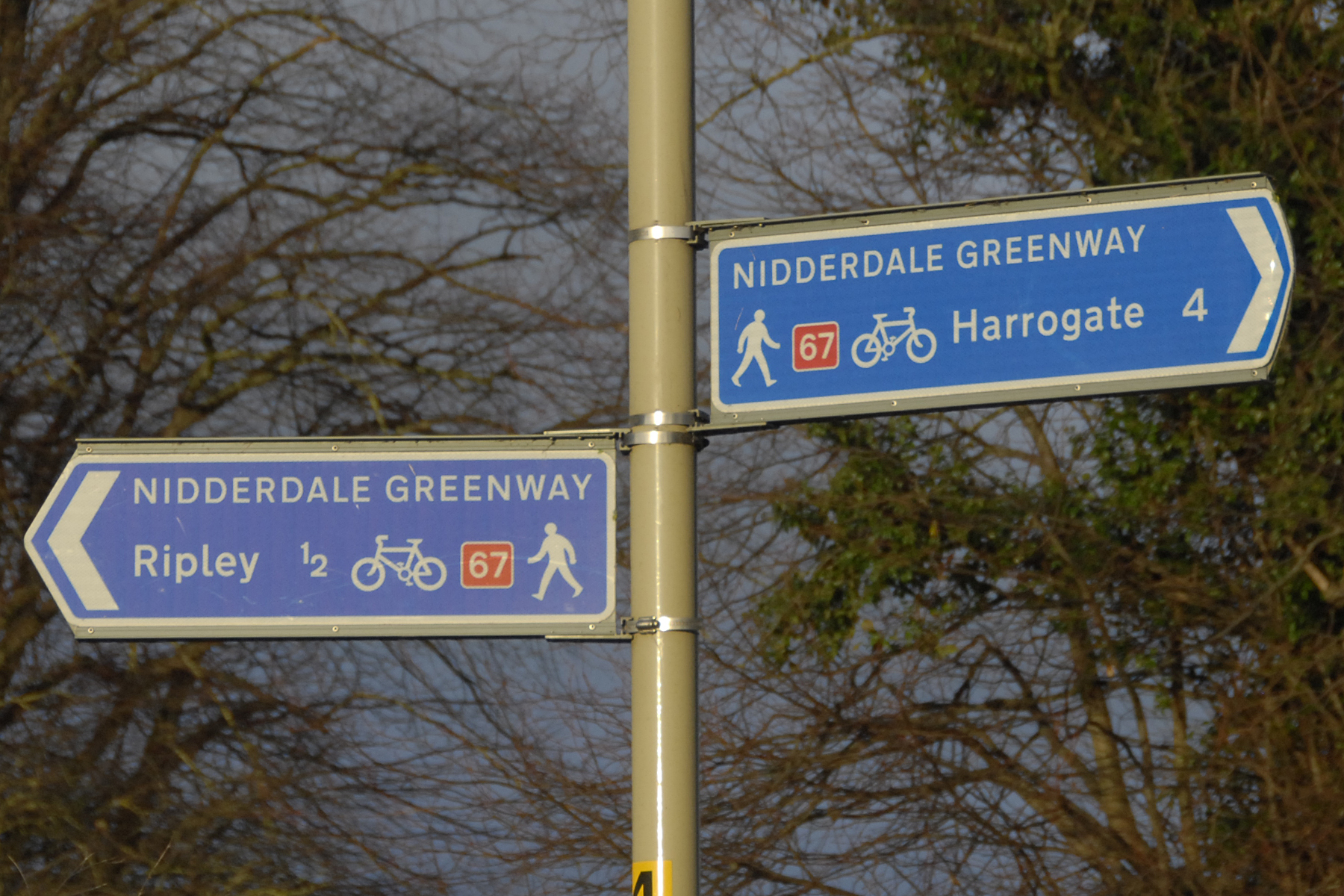
- Length: 200 kilometre
- Designation: National Cycle Network
- Trailheads: North: Long Whatton; South: Northallerton
- Use: Cycling
- Waymark
- Website: https://www.sustrans.org.uk/find-a-route-on-the-national-cycle-network/route-67/

National Cycle Network (NCN) Route 67 is a Sustrans National Route that runs from Long Whatton to Northallerton. The route is 124 miles (200 km) in length and is open but with sections missing.

== History ==
Many sections of the route are Railway Paths including ex Great Central Railway Five Pits Trail and ex North Eastern Railway Nidderdale Greenway.

== Route ==
The route is incomplete with gaps to the planned northern and southern trailheads and there are gaps south of Chesterfield. Between Leeds and Bramham the gap is filled by NCN Route 66.

=== Long Eaton to Heanor ===
The southern end of route 67 is at junction with NCN Route 6 in Long Eaton. Running north for 10 miles (16 km) to Heanor, it is a traffic free path (98%) through Shipley Country Park known as the Nutbrook Trail.

=== Blackwell to Grassmoor ===
There is a gap for approximately 10 miles (16 km) before NCN 67 restarts at Blackwell. This 5.5 miles (8.9 km) off-road route to Grassmoor is known as the Five Pits Trail.

=== Chesterfield to Leeds ===
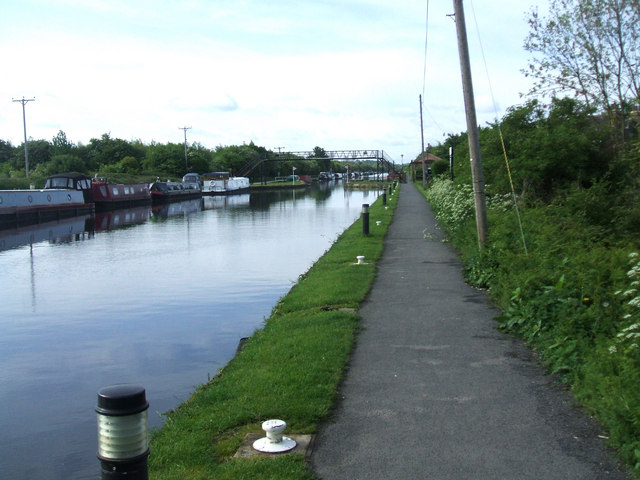
Ramsdens Bridge, The Aire Calder Navigation

The longest continuous section of NCN 67 is the 65 miles (105 km) Trans Pennine Trail (Central) route from Chesterfield to Leeds. It passes through the eastern sides of Sheffield, Barnsley and Wakefield. On reaching the south east of Leeds, it meets NCN Route 66 which can be followed east for 13 miles (21 km) to reach the next section.

=== Bramham to Ripon ===
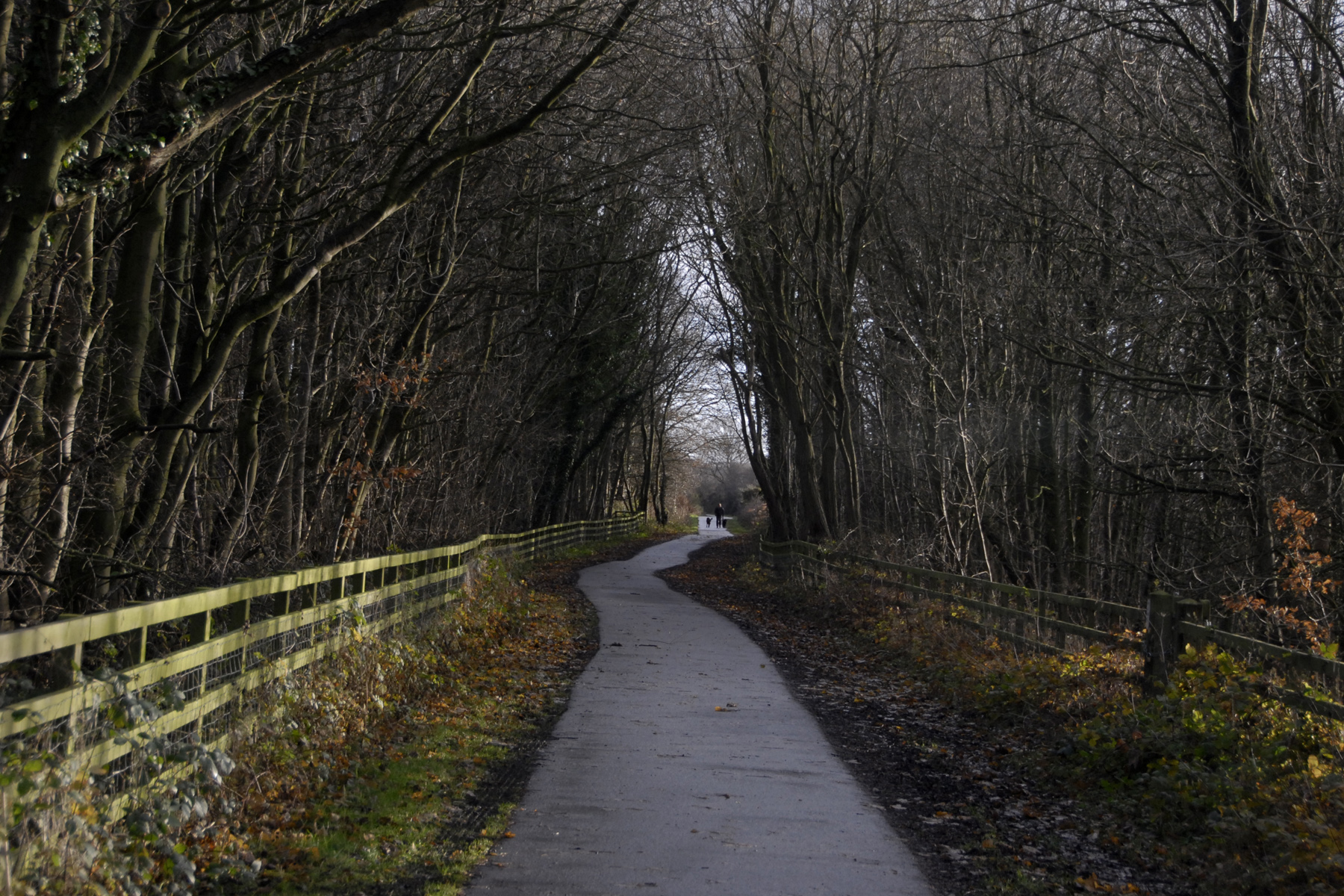
This view is looking south from the former Nidd Junction on the Leeds & Thirsk Railway, now used as the Nidderdale Greenway.

From Bramham the route uses paths adjacent to the A1(M) to Wetherby where it uses the Harland Way railway path to Spofforth. The route is the a mixture of on-road, traffic free and railway path through Harrogate to its current northern terminus at a junction with NCN Route 688 near Fountains Abbey. Route 688 can be followed for 5 miles (8.0 km) to reach Ripon.

== Related NCN routes ==
Route 67 is part of the Trans Pennine Trail (Central) route along with: 6 62 627 66

Route 67 meets the following routes:

- 66 at Leeds 53.788°N 1.523°W and Bramham 53.862°N 1.3455°W
- 665 at Wetherby 53.9329°N 1.3787°W
- 636 at Harrogate 54.0136°N 1.5232°W
- 688 at Fountains Abbey 54.0914°N 1.5771°W
- 62 at Wombwell 53.5342°N 1.4127°W and 53.5157°N 1.3706°W
- 6 at Meadowhall 53.4166°N 1.4095°W and Long Eaton 52.8964°N 1.2748°W
- 627 at Sheffield 53.3711°N 1.4041°W
