= National Cycle Route 648 =

Cycle route that connects Sherwood Forest and Shirebrook, England

NCN Route 648
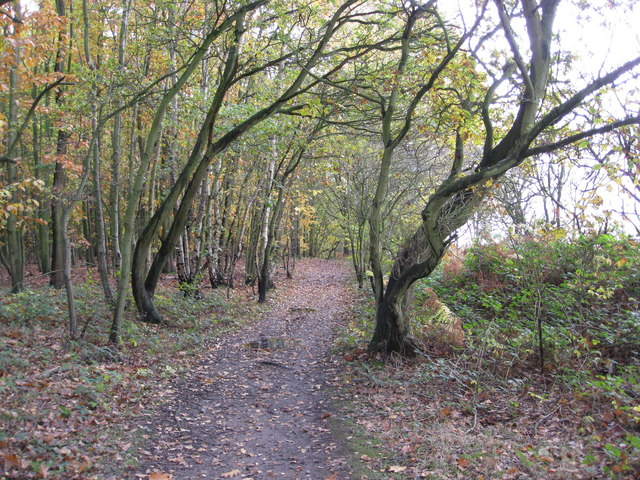
- Length: 8 kilometre
- Designation: UK National Cycle Network
- Trailheads: Bakewell (west) to Sherwood Forest (east)
- Use: Cycling
- Difficulty: Easy
- Waymark
- Website: sustrans.org.uk

National Cycle Network (NCN) Route 648 is a Sustrans National Route that connects Bakewell to Sherwood Forest. The route has opened between Sherwood Forest and Shirebrook and is 5 miles (8.0 km) in length and is signed in both directions.

== Route ==
Route 648 will connect Route 680 near Bakewell to Route 6 at Sherwood Forest. As of 2018, the only 5 miles between Shirebrook railway station and Route 6 is open. The route is a mixture of traffic free sections and roadside cycle paths.

Route 648 meets the following routes:

- 6 at Sherwood Forest
