= National Cycle Route 71 =

Cycle route in England

National Cycle Network (NCN) Route 71 is a Sustrans National Route that runs from Whitehaven and Workington on the Cumbrian coast to Kirby Knowle in North Yorkshire to join NCN Route 65. The route is fully open and signed in both directions.

== Route ==
The route is discontinuous and is made up of three sections. Originally it was signed as Route 71 continuously from western trailhead to eastern trailhead. The creation of the Pennine Cycleway (Route 68) and Route 70 (W2W) resulted in sections of Route 71 being renumbered to those routes.

=== Workington or Moor Row to Penrith ===
Route 71 has two strands at its western end. The northern strand trailhead is in Workington and heads east via Cockermouth. The southern strand trailhead is on Route 72 in Moor Row. It heads east to meet the northern strand in Thornthwaite. Passing through the heart of the Lake District at Keswick the route continues east to Little Blencow where this western section of the route ends. Route 7 links to the middle section in nearby Penrith.

=== Penrith to Tan Hill ===
The middle section of Route 71 leaves Route 7 at Penrith through the beautiful Eden Valley via Great Strickland and Kings Meaburn to Appleby where it meets Route 68. To reach the east section, Route 68 can be followed through Great Asby and then Route 70 hence to Kirkby Stephen, Barras and Tan Hill.

=== Tan Hill to Kirby Knowle ===
The eastern section of Route 71 starts at the northern edge of the Yorkshire Dales. Descending into Swaledale to Reeth. It shares the Route of the Tour de France from Grinton over into Wensleydale and Leyburn and Bedale. It continues via Northallerton to the eastern trailhead at Kirby Knowle where it meets National Route 65.

== Related NCN routes ==
The western section of the route is part of the popular coast to coast cycle route the Sea to Sea (C2C).

Route 71 meets the following routes:

- Route 72 at Whitehaven and Moor Row
- Route 6 at Threlkeld
- Route 7 at Little Blencow and Penrith
- Route 68 at Appleby in Westmoorland
- Route 70 at Tan Hill
- Route 657 at Upsall
- Route 65 at Kirby Knowle
