= Trans Pennine Trail =

207-mile footpath in northern England

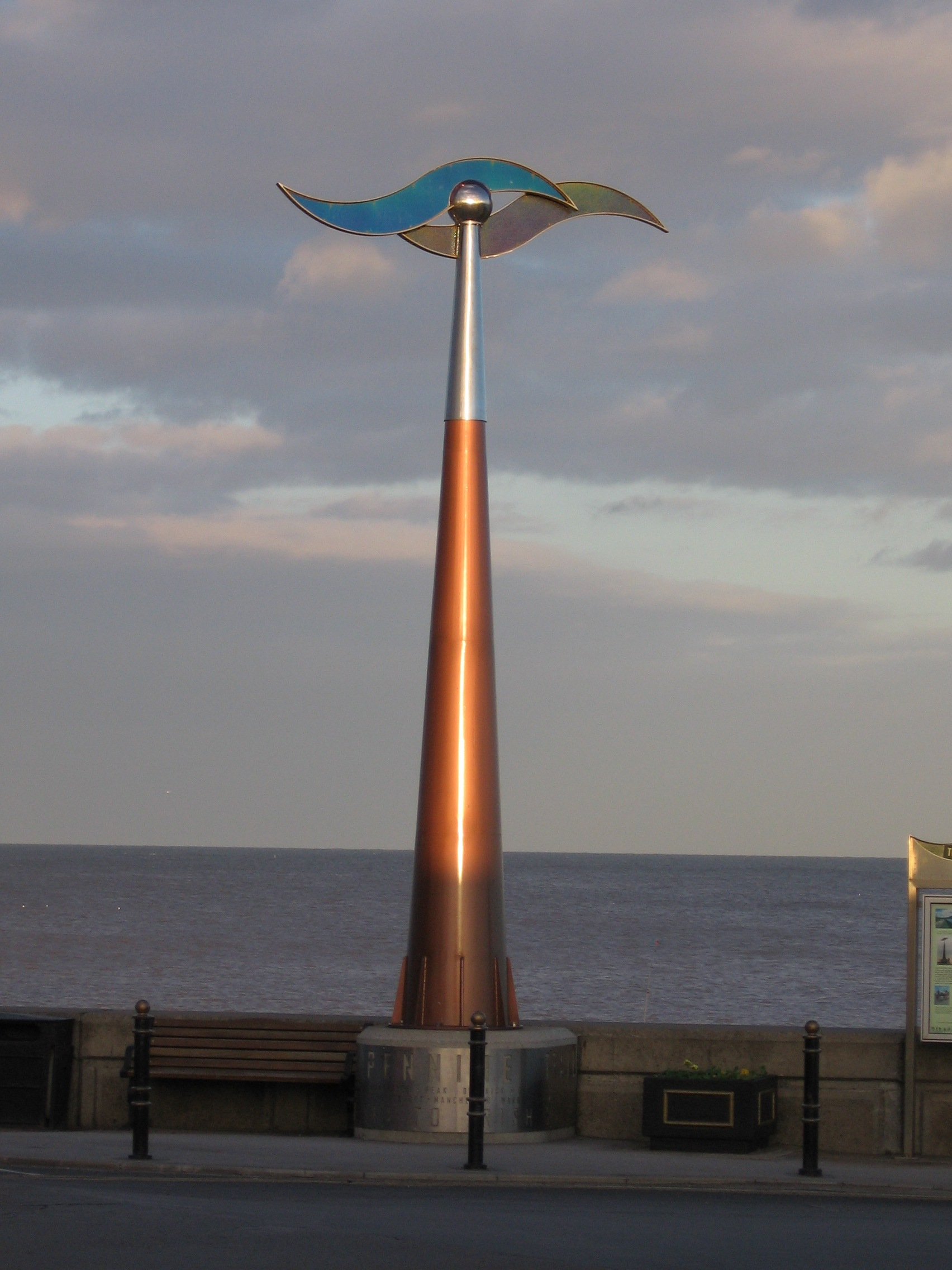
Marker at one end of the trail (Hornsea seafront).

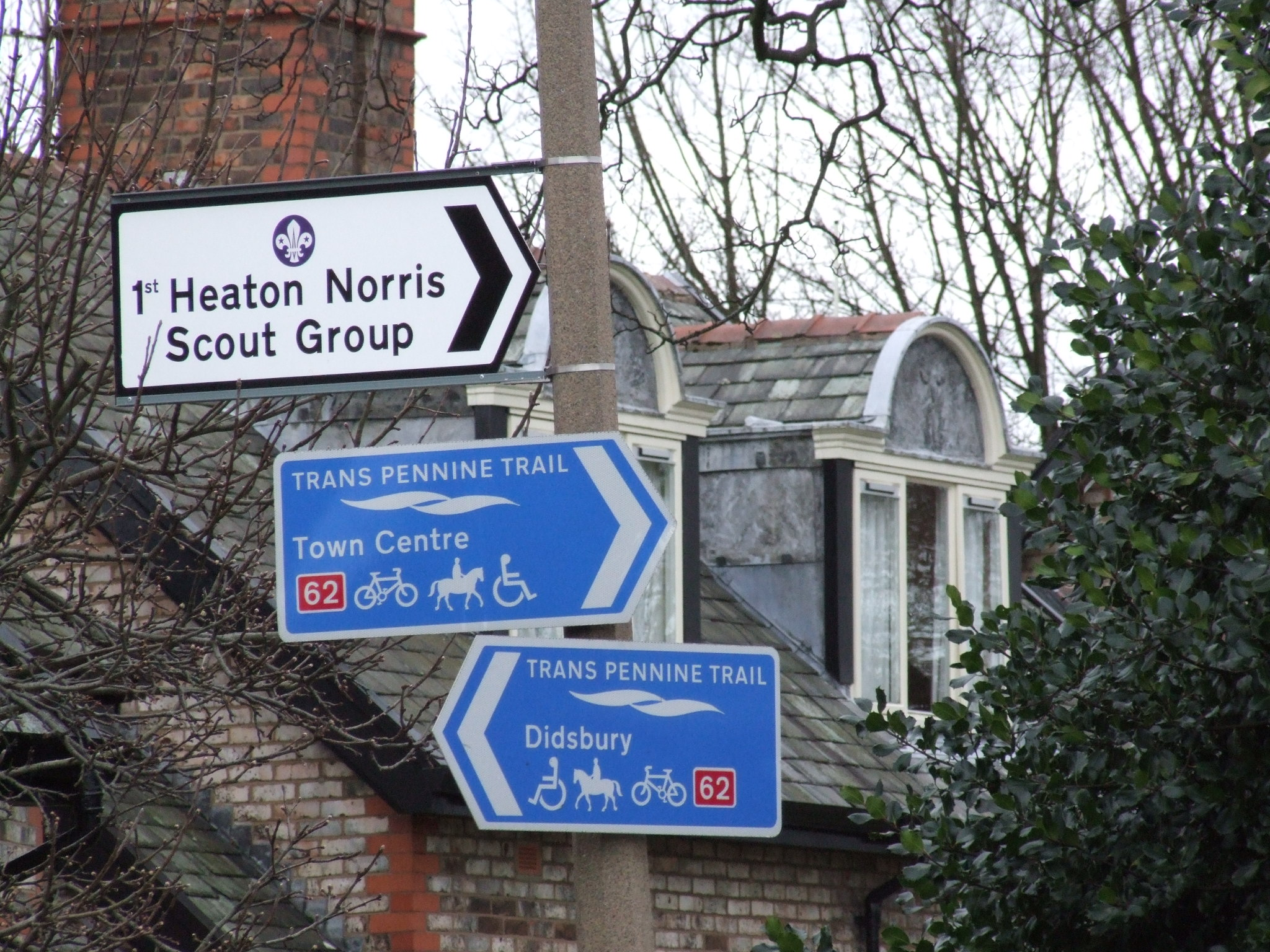
Road signs in Stockport referring to the Trail.

The Trans Pennine Trail is a long-distance path running from coast to coast across Northern England on a mixture of surfaced paths, with some short on-road sections, and with gentle gradients (it runs largely along disused railway lines and canal towpaths). It forms part of European walking route E8 and is part of the National Cycle Network as Route 62 (referencing the M62 motorway which also crosses the Pennines).

Most of the surfaces and gradients make it a relatively easy trail, suitable for cyclists, pushchairs and wheelchair users. The section between Stockport and Barnsley is hilly, especially near Woodhead, and not all sections or barriers are accessible for users of wheelchairs or non-standard cycles. Some parts are also open to horse riding.

The trail is administered from a central office in Barnsley, which is responsible for promotion and allocation of funding. However, the 27 local authorities whose areas the trail runs through are responsible for management of the trail within their boundaries.

== History ==
The idea originated from Barnsley, where the head office is now based. Work on the trail started in 1999. Early development was boosted by a £5 million investment by the Millennium Commission. The trail was officially opened in September 2001. However, the route was not fully completed until late 2004. It cost £60 million to construct.

== Route ==
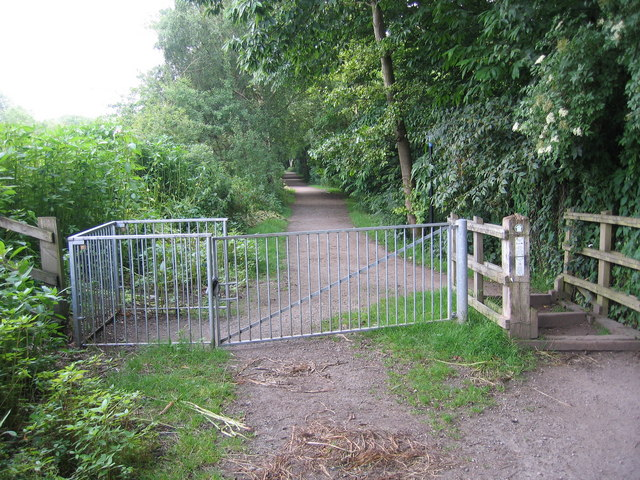
A gate on the trail near Hardy Farm

The main west–east trail starts at Southport, then heads south through the suburbs of Liverpool, through Widnes, Warrington, Manchester, Stockport and Hadfield. It then crosses the Peak District, heading up the Longdendale valley via the Longdendale Trail to Woodhead, then down through Dunford Bridge and Penistone, Doncaster, Selby, Hessle, Hull and Hornsea. This route covers 207 miles (333.1 km). Between Southport and Selby it is National Cycle Network, Route 62 and from Selby to Hornsea, NCN Route 65.

There is also a north–south trail that runs from Leeds and through Wakefield. It then passes through Barnsley and crosses over the main trail in the Dearne Valley area. After that it continues south to Sheffield and the Rother Valley Country Park before terminating in Chesterfield. This is NCN Route 67 and is 70 miles (112.7 km) long.

The route also has several deviations and loops in South Yorkshire, including one to Rotherham, NCN Route 6 and NCN Route 627 south of Penistone. Another 15-mile (24.1 km) spur runs from Selby to York, NCN Route 65.

The cross-continent European walking route E8 uses the trail between Hull and Liverpool to cross England. It also crosses both the eastern and western routes of European walking route E2.

== Certificates ==
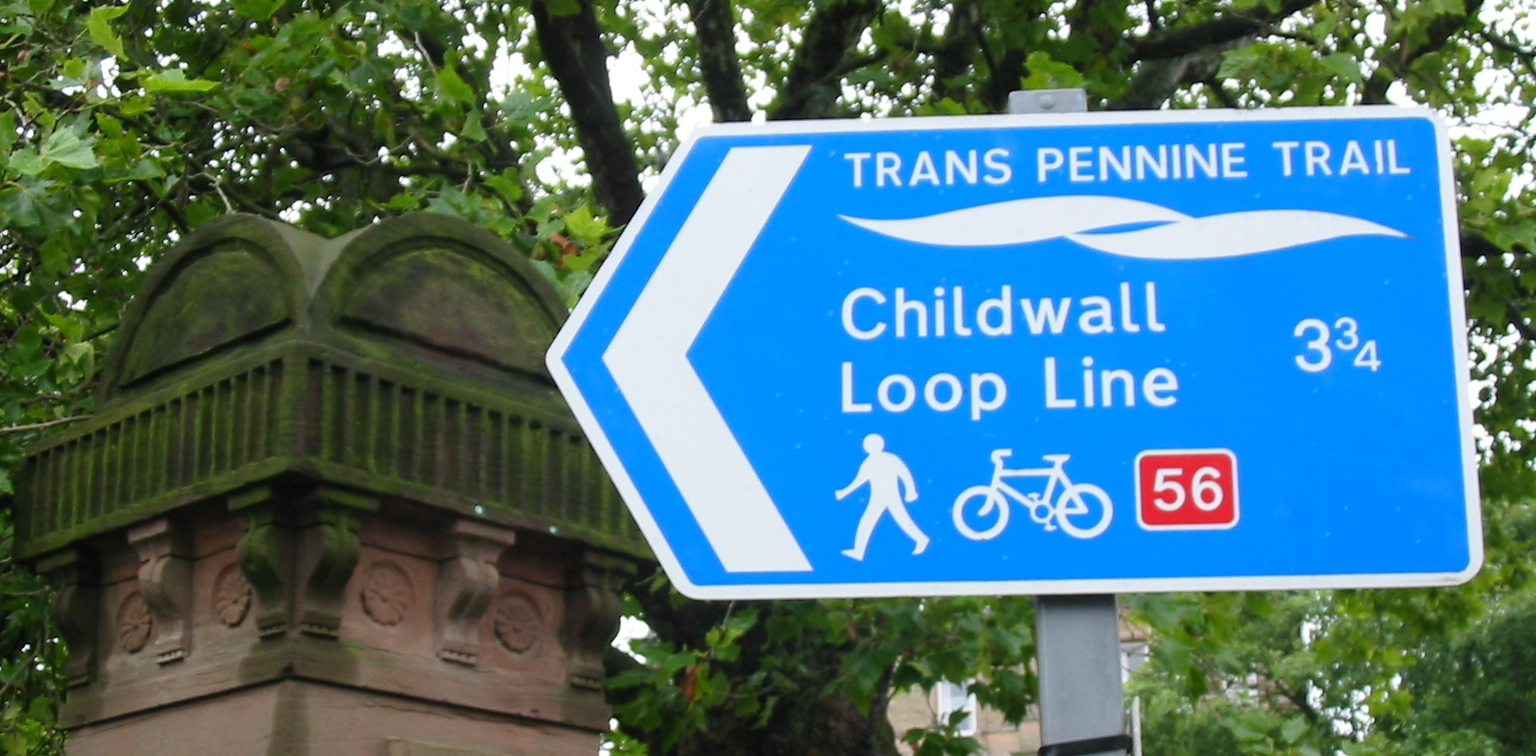
National Cycle Network sign in Liverpool

Certificates are handed out for covering different parts of the trail. In order to obtain them, trail users need to collect stamps at various points along the trail.

- Southport to Hornsea: 207 miles (333.1 km)
- Liverpool to Hull: 179 miles (288.1 km)
- Liverpool to Hornsea: 192 miles (309.0 km)
- Southport to Hull: 194 miles (312.2 km)
- Whole route (including north/south links): 350 miles (563.3 km)

== See also ==
- Rail trail
- List of recreational walks in Cheshire
