= National Cycle Route 622 =

Cycle route in the United Kingdom

Coordinates: 53.7524°N 2.69678°W

NCR 622 sign in Avenham Park at the junction of NCR 6 and 55

National Cycle Route 622, the Preston Guild Wheel, part of the National Cycle Network in North West England, is a 21-mile cycle and walking route encircling the city of Preston in Lancashire and is one of the city's flagship Guild Legacy projects from the 2012 Preston Guild.

Preston is also the midpoint of the national cycle network.

== History ==
The route was initiated by members of Preston Cycle Forum, including Peter Ward (a former City Councillor and racing cyclist) and Mike Atkins, the County's former cycling officer. Following the completion of the Guild Wheel Peter Ward received an MBE for his services to cycling. The section along the river by Miller Park has been named Mike Atkins Way after Mike Atkins who died in 2013. The route is also promoted as a walking route and is dog-friendly.

== Route ==
The route is a 21-mile-long (34 km) "greenway" encircling the city of Preston. The route opened in August 2012 in the run up to the main week of the Guild celebrations and passes sights such as Preston Docklands, Avenham and Miller Parks and Brockholes Nature Reserve. The route follows mainly the River Ribble to the south, and goes as far as Broughton in the north. It uses traffic free multi-user paths with pedestrians and quiet roads.

The route has led to an increased interest in cycling in the Preston area. Cycle flows at a count point on the Guild Wheel increased by 175% to just under 100,000 a year from 2011 to 2013 with peak of 968 cyclists in a day in 2013. The success of the Guild Wheel has led to proposals to create similar routes in Blackburn, Leyland and Longridge. Parts of the route are also well used by walkers and runners. The route is very much a recreation facility for all users.

Following concerns about the speeds of some cyclists, a "Share with Care" campaign was launched in 2013 promoting a code of practise for the route.
