= Pennine Cycleway =

Long-distance cycle route in England

- Length: 327 mi (526 km)
- Location: Derbyshire, West Yorkshire, Lancashire, North Yorkshire, Cumbria, Northumberland
- Established: 2003
- Trailheads: Derby; 52.922°N 1.476°W; Berwick-upon-Tweed; 55.771°N 2.007°W

The Pennine Cycleway is a Sustrans-sponsored route in the Pennines range in northern England, an area often called the "backbone of England". The route passes through the counties of Derbyshire, West Yorkshire, Lancashire, North Yorkshire, Cumbria and Northumberland. It is part of the National Cycle Network (NCN). Sustrans founder John Grimshaw calls it 'the best National Cycle Network route of the lot'.

The majority of the route follows NCN 68. It also makes use of several other NCN routes including 6, 54, 62, 70, 7, 72 and 1.

It has a total length of about 327 miles (526 km). The route was opened in stages in 2002–03.

== History ==
The route was devised for Sustrans, a UK, partially government-funded charity that promotes sustainable transport, who were looking for an "exhilarating long distance pubs 'n' scenery challenge ride" to rival the Sea to Sea Cycle Route (C2C). The northern section, designed by Ted Liddle, was launched in a low-profile way in summer 2002, because of the after-effects of the foot-and-mouth outbreak. Cyclists marked the opening of the entire route in July 2003.

== Route ==
The Sustrans organization describe the Pennine Cycleway route in three sections: Peak District, South Pennines and North Pennines. It goes through the National Parks of the Peak District, the Yorkshire Dales, and Northumberland, while skirting the eastern Lake District. About 20% is on traffic-free cycleway routes, and the remainder is along quiet low traffic roads.

=== Peak District ===
The Peak District section is 80 miles (130 km) long. It runs from Derby in the English Midlands to Holmfirth in West Yorkshire, passing Ashbourne, Buxton and New Mills, and includes the traffic-free rail trails at Tissington and Longdendale (also part of the Trans Pennine Trail). The initial section to Etwall is part of National Cycle Network Route 54, and around Buxton short sections of the High Peak Trail and Midshires Way are followed.

=== South Pennines ===
The South Pennines section is 124 miles (200 km) long, with 18 traffic-free. It runs from Holmfirth via Upperthong, Meltham and Slaithwaite, encountering the M62 motorway as it crosses the dam at Scammonden Reservoir. Passing through Barkisland, Sowerby Bridge, Mytholmroyd and Hebden Bridge (this part of the route is shared with National Cycle Route 66) to Heptonstall, where the route splits in two. To get to Colne in Lancashire, riders can either head to Burnley and through Towneley Park to join the towpath of the Leeds and Liverpool Canal, or past Widdop and Coldwell Reservoirs. Rejoining the canal at Foulridge, through Salterforth and Barnoldswick to West Marton in North Yorkshire, where the route crosses the A59, and on to Gargrave. Continuing through Winterburn and Airton (shared with the Way of the Roses) to Settle, and then Stackhouse, Wharfe, Austwick, Clapham, and Ingleton to Dent, Cumbria. After encountering the M6 near Tebay Services, it is on to Orton, Great Asby and Sedbergh, to finish at Appleby in Cumbria. This part of the route includes connections to Kendal and Kirkby Stephen.

=== North Pennines ===
The North Pennines section is 150 miles (240 km) long, with eight traffic-free. The route runs from Appleby (with a branch from Penrith) to Berwick-upon-Tweed on the Scottish border, passing Slaggyford (where it follows the South Tyne Trail), Haltwhistle, Bellingham and Branton. Between Renwick and Leadgate it briefly follows the A686 road which is also part of the Sea to Sea Cycle Route (National Cycle Route 7). The final ride from Norham is shared with National Cycle Route 1.

== Media gallery ==
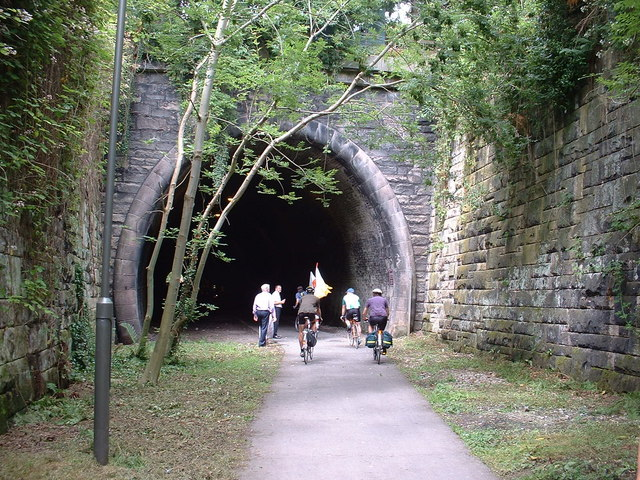
Ashbourne Tunnel on the Tissington Trail, Derbyshire

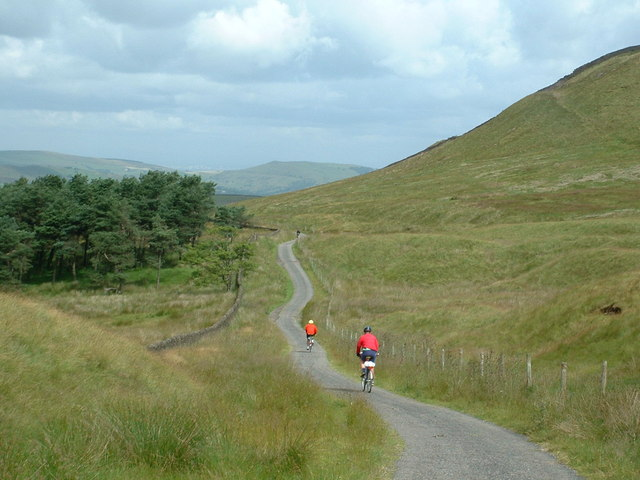
On a section of the Midshires Way near Buxton, Derbyshire

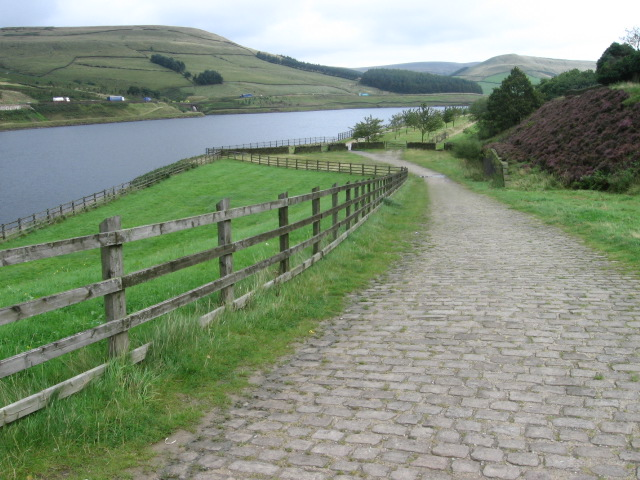
Longdendale Trail at Woodhead Reservoir on NCN 62

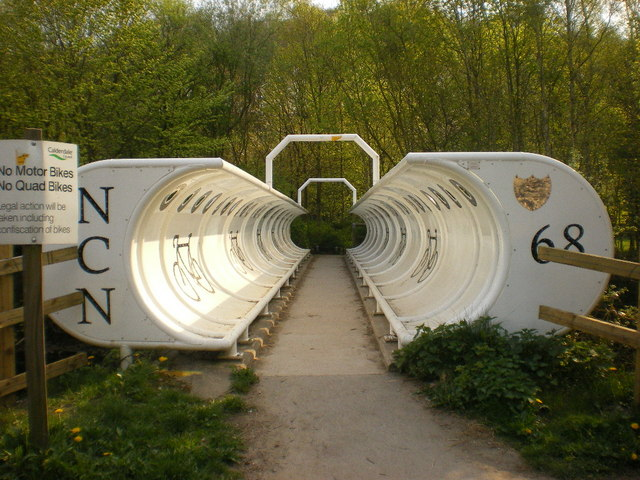
New bridge on the River Calder at Sowerby Bridge, West Yorkshire

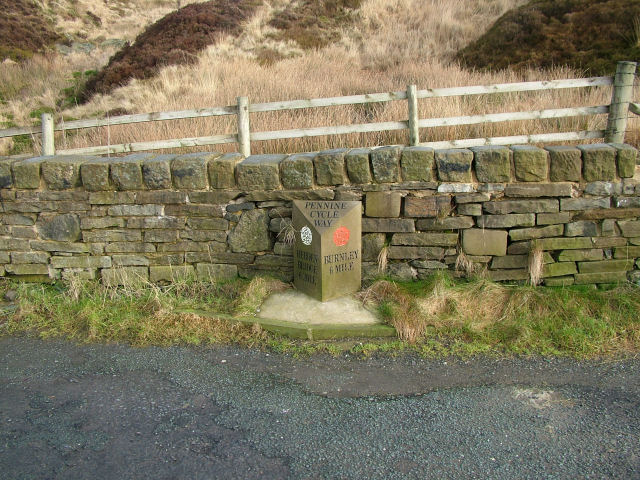
On the West Yorkshire, Lancashire border half-way between Hebden Bridge and Burnley

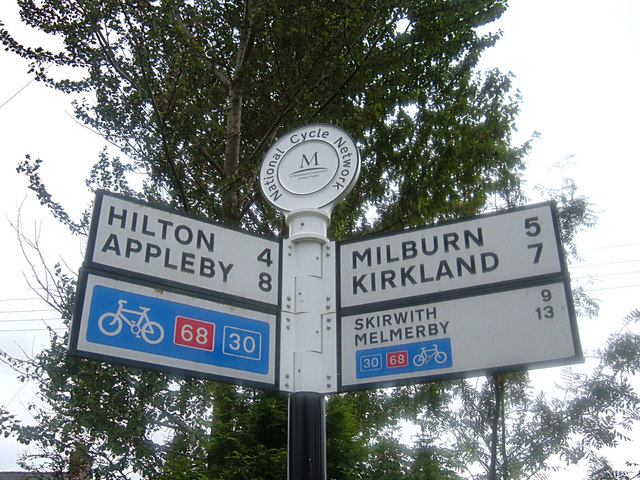
Signpost at Dufton, Cumbria

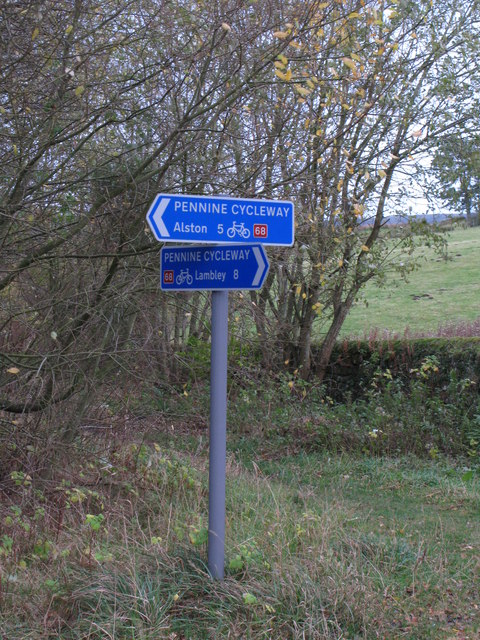
Signpost near Slaggyford, Northumberland

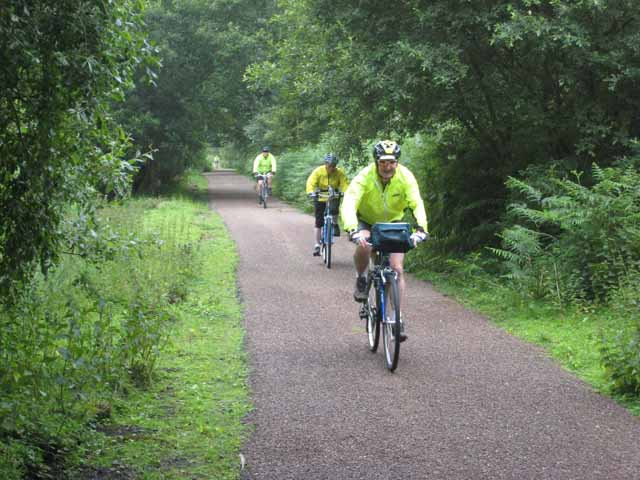
On the South Tyne Trail near Lambley, Northumberland

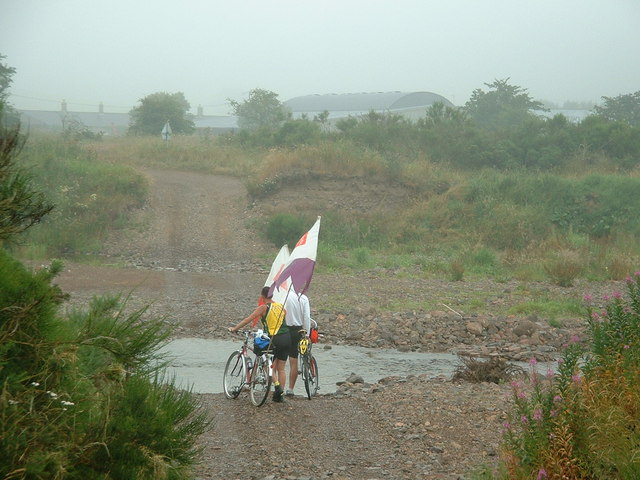
Ford over the river Breamish at Brandon, Northumberland

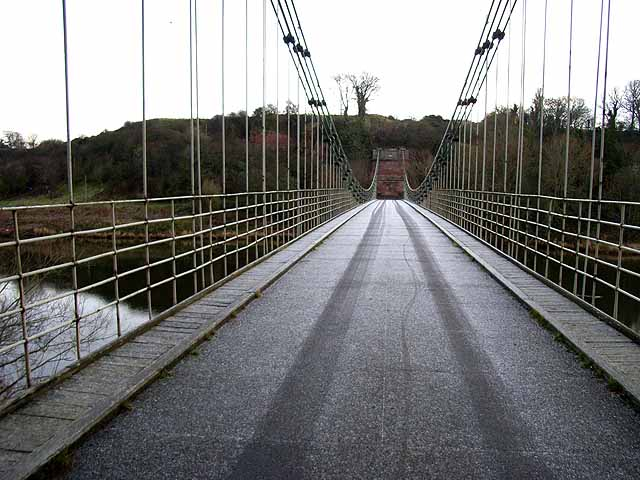
The Union Chain Bridge crossing the River Tweed on NCN 1

== See also ==
- The long-distance trails in the Pennines include:

- Pennine Bridleway
- Pennine Way
- Trans Pennine Trail
- Way of the Roses

- List of National Cycle Network routes
- National Trails
