= National Cycle Route 66 =

Cycle route from Kingston upon Hull to Manchester, England

National Cycle Network (NCN) Route 66 is a Sustrans National Route that runs from Kingston upon Hull to Manchester via Beverley, York and Leeds.

Between Pocklington and York it forms part of the Way of the Roses challenge route. In 1998 the section of route 66 between Hull and York was branded The White Rose cycle route. This branding is no longer in use.

== Route ==
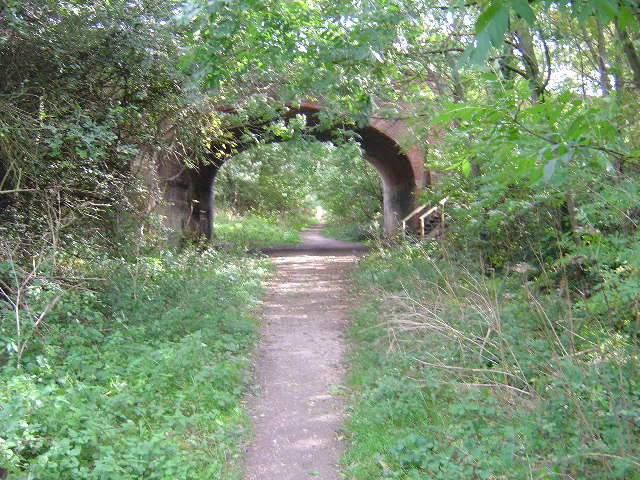
Hudson Way near Beverley

=== Hull to York ===
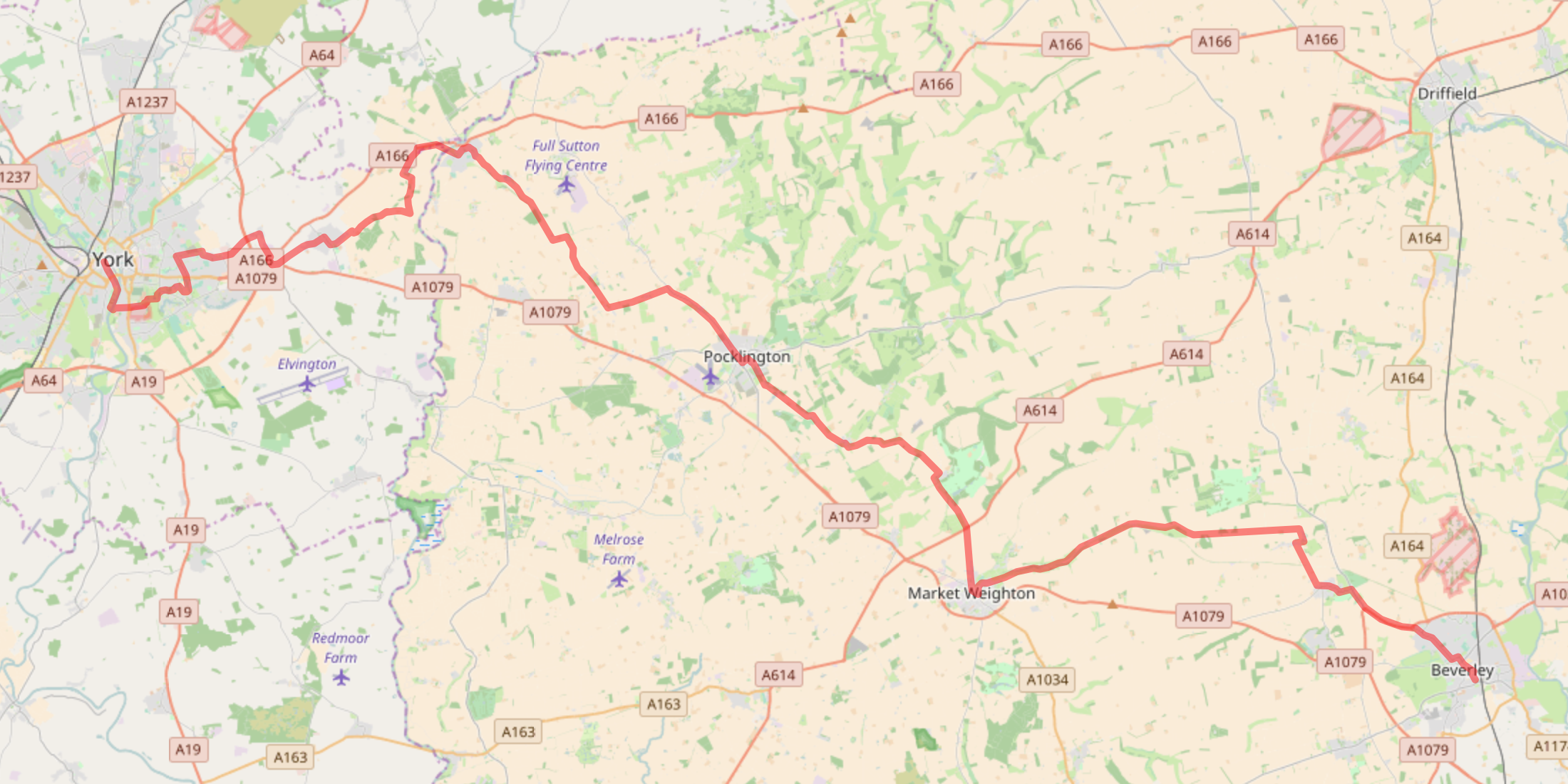
Map of the National Cycle Network Route 66 between Beverley and York

The route leaves Hull via its Northern suburbs. Between Cottingham and passing Beverley Minster, it coincides with National Cycle Route 1, via the A164 and A1035 roads to the villages of Cherry Burton and Etton. Beyond Etton Route 1 departs to the north, and Route 66 runs along minor roads parallel to the Hudson Way, a rail trail along the former York to Beverley Line. The route heads generally westwards, passing south of Goodmanham (where it is crossed by the Yorkshire Wolds Way) and then through the centre of Market Weighton. The Hull to Market Wieghton section is 23.5 miles (37.8 km) long.

From Market Weighton, Route 66 takes a more northerly turn and follows minor roads to Pocklington via Londesborough and Burnby. Beyond Pocklington it heads northwest to Stamford Bridge, where it crosses the River Derwent (and the Minster Way, which also connects Beverley and York) via the disused railway viaduct. It then heads southwest along an off-road route to Dunnington and thence to Murton, home of the Yorkshire Museum of Farming on the outskirts of York. At Osbaldwick the route briefly follows the line of the former Derwent Valley Light Railway towards the city centre. At a junction with Route 658 (53.9597°N 1.0511°W) the route heads through the southern suburbs of the city, passing through the campus of York University to cross the River Ouse via the Millennium Bridge. The section between Market Weighton and York is 27 miles (43 km) long.

The section of Route 66 between Pocklington (53.9309°N 0.7758°W) and York (53.9597°N 1.0511°W) is part of the Way of the Roses challenge ride.

=== York to Leeds ===
Route 66 between York and Leeds is still under development. From York's Millennium Bridge it follows the off-road York-Selby cycle path, which is part of Route 65. It separates from Route 65 at Bishopthorpe and takes country lanes for 9.5 miles (15.3 km) to Tadcaster. As of Summer 2017 this section was unsigned.

The route between Tadcaster and Bramham has yet to be determined.

Running south from Bramham parallel to the A1(M) to Aberford, the route then takes an off-road track, through the Parlington estate to Garforth and hence on and off-road sections through Temple Newsam and into Leeds via the River Aire towpath. Bramham to Leeds is 17 miles (27 km) long.

=== Leeds to Manchester ===
From Leeds, the route follows the Leeds-Liverpool canal out of West Leeds and up to Shipley. At Shipley, the canal continues as National Cycle Route 696. The route goes south from Shipley towards Bradford city centre on a mainly off-road route. Major improvements to this section of the route were constructed in 2018. From Bradford City Park, the route goes towards Bowling Park via the Big Red Bridge and up to Bierley and passes beneath the M606 to Low Moor. At Low Moor, the route joins the off-road Spen Valley Greenway - following a former railway trackbed to Dewsbury. The route is broken from Dewsbury to Brighouse. At Brighouse, the route follows the Calder and Hebble Navigation to Sowerby Bridge, then there is a mixed off-road from Sowerby Bridge to Manchester closely following the Rochdale canal through Hebden Bridge, Todmorden, Littleborough and Rochdale.
