= List of National Cycle Network routes =

This is a list of routes on Sustrans's National Cycle Network within the United Kingdom.

As the cycle network has not been fully completed, some sections of routes are still under construction.

== Single Digit Main National Routes ==
Number	Route	Major incomplete sections	Notes	Map
1	Dover – Shetland, along the east coast, via London, Edinburgh, John o' Groats and Orkney	Whitby - Staithes		Map
2	Dover – St Austell, along the south coast, when completed.	Dawlish – Totnes; Plymouth – St Austell		OSM
3	Bristol – Land's End		Incorporating the West Country Way and the Cornish Way, via St. Austell, Bude, Barnstaple, Taunton and Wells	OSM
4	Greenwich – Fishguard, in West Wales, via Reading, Bath, Bristol, Newport, Caerphilly, Pontypridd, Swansea, Carmarthen, Tenby, Haverfordwest and St. Davids			Map
5	Reading – Holyhead, via Birmingham, The Midlands and the North Wales coast	Walsall – Stafford; diversions at Colwyn Bay.		Map
6	Windsor – Lake District, via Milton Keynes, Leicester, Derby, Nottingham, Sheffield, Manchester, Preston and Lancaster	Castleton – Reddish, Blackburn – Preston		OSM
7	Sunderland – Inverness via Carlisle and Glasgow		Eastern section of C2C. Incorporating the Clyde and Loch Lomond Cycleway	OSM
8	Cardiff – Holyhead, via Brecon, Builth Wells, Machynlleth, Porthmadog and Bangor, through the heart of Wales.		Also known as Lôn Las Cymru	OSM
9	Belfast – Dublin, when completed, via Lisburn, Craigavon, Portadown and Scarva	Slieve Gullion – Dublin		Map

== Double Digit National Routes ==
Number	Route	Major incomplete sections	Notes	Map
10	Cockermouth – North Shields, via Carlisle, Kielder Forest, and Bellingham		Forms the majority of the Reivers Cycle Route	OSM
11	Harlow – Wiggenhall St Germans (south of King's Lynn), via Cambridge and Ely	Harlow – Stanstead Mountfitchet; Waterbeach – Wicken; link to Saffron Walden; Shadoxhurst (joins Route 18) to Lydd (joins Route 2)		OSM
12	Enfield – Spalding, via Potters Bar, Hatfield, Stevenage, St Neots, Peterborough	Enfield Lock – Hadley Wood; intermittent sections Stotfold – Sandy	Also known as the Great North Way	OSM
13	Tower Bridge – Barking – Grays – Chelmsford – Colchester – Bury St Edmunds – Thetford – Fakenham	Sections around Grays	Joins route 1 between Chelmsford and Colchester	OSM
14	Darlington – Stockton-on-Tees – Hartlepool – Durham – Consett – South Shields		Also known as the Three Rivers Cycle Route	OSM
15	(Nottingham – Grantham – Sleaford)		Connect route 6 in Belton, near Shepshed Leicestershire with route 1 in Lincolnshire near Coningsb	OSM
16	(Basildon – Shoeburyness)			OSM
17	Rochester – ( spur to Maidstone) – Ashford (proposed) to Newchurch, Kent joining Route 2			OSM
18	Canterbury – Ashford – Tenterden – Tunbridge Wells			OSM
20	Wandsworth – Redhill – Crawley – Brighton		Joins route 21 between Redhill and Crawley	OSM
21	Greenwich – Lewisham – Crawley – East Grinstead – Heathfield – Eastbourne		Several sections are not suitable for road bikes.	OSM
22	Banstead – Dorking – Guildford – Farnham – Petersfield – Havant – Portsmouth – (by ferry to Isle of Wight) – Ryde – Yarmouth – (by ferry to New Forest) – Lymington – Brockenhurst		ferry connections are required from Portsmouth to Ryde, and again from Yarmouth to Lymington	OSM
23	Reading – Basingstoke – Winchester – Eastleigh – Southampton – Cowes – Sandown			OSM
24	Bath – Radstock – Frome – Longleat – Warminster – Salisbury – Romsey – Eastleigh		Also known as the Colliers Way	OSM
25	Longleat – Gillingham – Blandford Forum – Poole – Bournemouth			OSM
26	Portishead – Clevedon – Cheddar – Wells – Glastonbury – Yeovil – Dorchester – Weymouth – Portland Bill	Portishead – Clevedon; Cheddar – Glastonbury	Also known as The Strawberry Line	OSM
27	Ilfracombe – Barnstaple – Okehampton – Tavistock – Plymouth		Also known as the Devon Coast to Coast cycle route	OSM
28	Okehampton – Bovey Tracey – Newton Abbot – Totnes – Salcombe – Yealmpton – Plymouth	Okehampton – Bovey Tracey; Newton Abbot – Tontes; Yealmpton – Plymouth		OSM
32	Bodmin – Padstow – Newquay – Truro		Part of the Cornish Way cycle route	OSM
33	Bristol – Nailsea – Weston-super-Mare – Bridgwater – Taunton – Ilminster – Chard – Axminster – Seaton	Nailsea – Weston-super-Mare	Also known as the Wessex Cycleway	OSM
34	Exeter St Davids – Exeter – Bridge Road		Joins route 2 at Bridge Road	Map
41	Bristol – Gloucester – Cheltenham – Tewkesbury – Evesham – Stratford-upon-Avon – Royal Leamington Spa – Rugby	Cheltenham – Tewkesbury; Evesham – Stratford-upon-Avon		OSM
42	Gloucester – Cinderford – Parkend – Chepstow – Abergavenny – Hay-on-Wye – Glasbury	Gloucester – Cinderford; Parkend – Chepstow		OSM
43	Swansea – Caehopkin – Llanwrtyd Wells – Builth Wells	Caehopkin – Llanwrtyd Wells		OSM
44	Shrewsbury – Bishop's Castle – Bromfield – Ludlow – Hereford – Cinderford	Ludlow – Cinderford		OSM
45	Chester – Shrewsbury – Kidderminster – Worcester – Gloucester – Swindon – Salisbury			OSM
46	Bromsgrove – Droitwich – Worcester – Hereford – Abergavenny – Merthyr Tydfil – Neath	Worcester – Hereford		OSM
47	Newport – Neath – Swansea – Llanelli – Carmarthen – Fishguard	Neath – Llanelli		OSM
48	Lincoln – Leicester – Cirencester – Bath – Exeter	Cirencester – Exeter		OSM
49	Abergavenny – Pontypool – Cwmbran – Newport			OSM
50	(Maidenhead – Winslow)			OSM
51	Colchester – Harwich – Ipswich- Felixstowe – Cambridge – Bedford – Milton Keynes – Oxford			OSM
52	(Stratford-upon-Avon – Loughborough)			OSM
53	(Peterborough – Lichfield)			OSM
54	(Stourport-on-Severn – Kidderminster – Dudley) – Lichfield – Derby			OSM
55	(Ironbridge – Preston)			OSM
56	Chester – Liverpool, via Wallasey			OSM
57	Northleach – Witney (-) Oxford – Thame – Princes Risborough – Chesham (–) Hemel Hempstead – Harpenden (– Welwyn Garden City)			OSM
60	Manchester – Prestwich	Cheetham Hill – Prestwich		OSM
61	Maidenhead – Uxbridge – Rickmansworth – Hatfield – Ware			OSM
62	Fleetwood – Blackpool – Preston – Southport – Liverpool – Warrington – Manchester – Doncaster – Selby	Hutton – Southport	The Trans Pennine Trail	OSM
63	Burton upon Trent – Leicester – Oakham (–) Peterborough – Wisbech			OSM
64	Market Harborough – Melton Mowbray (–) Collingham – Lincoln			OSM
65	Hornsea – Hull – Selby – York – Middlesbrough		Also known as the White Rose cycle route	OSM
66	Spurn Head – Hull – Beverley – York – Leeds – Bradford – Hebden Bridge – Rochdale – Manchester	Spurn – Hull; Tadcaster – Branham; Mirfield – Brighouse; Castleton – Failsworth		OSM
67	Long Eaton – Heanor – Chesterfield – Leeds –Northallerton		Includes the Nidderdale Greenway and Trans Pennine Trail	OSM
68	Derby – Buxton – New Mills - Holmfirth – Settle – Appleby – Haltwhistle – Berwick-upon-Tweed		The Pennine Cycleway running up the spine of England	OSM
69	Morecambe – Settle – Skipton – Cullingworth – Huddersfield – Horbury – Pontefract – Althorpe – Caistor – Grimsby	Other than the long section forming a part of the Way of the Roses, Route 69 comprises a number of discontinuous, short traffic free sections throughout Yorkshire	Is western end of the Way of the Roses	OSM
70	Barrow-in-Furness – Kendal – Kirkby Stephen – Barnard Castle – Durham – Sunderland		W2W, Walney 2 Wear	Map
71	Northallerton – Appleby – Penrith – Whitehaven and Workington		Western end of C2C	OSM
72	Kendal – Barrow-in-Furness – Whitehaven – Silloth – Carlisle – Tynemouth	Kendal – Ravenglass	Includes Hadrian's Cycleway	OSM
73	Newton Stewart – Stranraer and Lochranza – Kilmarnock			OSM
74	Gretna – Douglas (– Lesmahagow –) Larkhall – Hamilton – Uddingston			OSM
75	Portavadie – Dunoon – Gourock – Glasgow – Edinburgh – Leith			OSM
76	Berwick-upon-Tweed – Edinburgh – Stirling – Kirkcaldy - St Andrews	Kirkcaldy - St Andrews	The Round the Forth Route	OSM
77	Dundee – Pitlochry, via Perth			OSM
78	Campbeltown – Inverness		Great Glens Cycle Route	OSM
81	Aberystwyth – Shrewsbury – Telford – Wolverhampton – Smethwick		Known as Lon Cambria	OSM
82	Bangor – Capel Curig - Porthmadog – Dolgellau – Machynlleth (–) Ystrad Meurig – Fishguard			OSM
84	Rhyl – St Asaph (- Llangollen – Oswestry)			OSM
85	Chester – Wrexham - Trevor – Llangollen (- Corwen – Bala – Dolgellau)			OSM
88	Caerleon – Newport – Cardiff( – Bridgend)			Map
91	Armagh; Enniskillen		Almost entirely scrapped on safety grounds in 2020; just a couple of short sections at Armagh & Enniskillen remain.	Map
92	Derry; Strabane		Most of this route was scrapped in 2020 on safety grounds - 21 km remains at Derry and a short cross-border stretch between Lifford and Strabane	Map
93	Bangor & Belfast – Newtownabbey & Larne - Ballycastle - Coleraine - Limavady - Derry		Most of this coastal route was de-designated on safety grounds in 2020; other than sections along Belfast Lough shore, only a few vestigial segments remain.	Map
94	Formerly a circuit of Lough Neagh; now just Antrim - Randalstown; Lagan Towpath near Aghagallon		Most of this route was de-designated on safety grounds in 2020, just 15 km remains.	Map
95			All of this route was de-designated on safety grounds in 2020.	Map
96	Ballymoney; Coleraine		Most of this route was de-designated on safety grounds in 2020, less than 8 km remain	Map
97	Ballymena		Most of this route was de-designated on safety grounds in 2020, less than 2 km remains, at the 'ECOS Centre' in Ballymena	Map
99	Belfast – Comber; Newcastle		Most of this route was de-designated on safety grounds in 2020, only remaining sections are the 'Comber Greenway' and a small section in Newcastle.	Map

== Three Digit Regional Routes ==
=== Zone 1 ===
- 110: (Cleethorpes – Beelsby, Lincolnshire) linking Cleethorpes to NCR 1 at Beelsby
- 122: (Sandy – Gamlingay – Cambridge)
- 123: (Eaton Socon – Cambridge)
- 125: Darent Valley (Dartford) – this follows the route of the long-distance path Darent Valley Path)
- 136: Ingrebourne Valley Connect2 scheme
- 137: Stifford Bridge and Purfleet, (following the route of the Mardyke Way (along the Mardyke (river))
- 141: Keelman's Way: Wylam – NCN 14 (along south bank of River Tyne)
- 151: Sleaford branch of NCN15
- 155: Morpeth
- 164: Pocklington - Hutton Cranswick and Kiplingcotes - Beverley. Part of the Yorkshire Wolds Cycle Route and The Way of the Roses route.
- 165: Barnard Castle - Whitby. A branch of the W2W route (previously regional route 52)
- 166: Kirkham Abbey- Hunmanby. Part of the Yorkshire Wolds Cycle Route.
- 167: Kirkham Abbey - Huggate. Part of the Yorkshire Wolds Cycle Route.
- 168: link south-east of Middlesbrough
- 169: Scunthorpe Ridgeway
- 172: Towpath of Royal Military Canal
- 174: Isle of Sheppey – 'Sheerness Way'
- 177: Maidstone – Ashford
- 178: Maidstone – Tonbridge
- 179: Around the Hoo Peninsula (also known as the Heron Trail)
- 195: Aberdeen – Aboyne
- 196: Pencaitland railway path (RR 73) east of Edinburgh

=== Zone 2 ===
- 207: Devon: South Brent – Dartington
- 208: South London: Sutton Common – Wimbledon
- 212: (Beddington Park, Sutton – South Norwood Country Park, Croydon) - de-designated
- 221: Basingstoke Canal
- 222: Sussex Downs Link
- 223: Guildford – Chertsey
- 224: Farnham – Medstead
- 231: Isle of Wight
- 232: (Mitcham Common, Merton – Lloyd Park, Croydon) - de-designated
- 235: Isle of Wight
- 236: Portsmouth – Lyndhurst
- 244: Two Tunnels Greenway, Bath
- 246: Totton – Romsey – Andover – Stockbridge – Kintbury
- 248: Honiton – Sidmouth
- 250: North Dorset Trailway
- 253: South Somerset Cycleway (RR41)
- 254: Wiltshire Cycleway
- 255: Wiltshire Cycleway links, Chippenham area
- 256: Ringwood – Wimborne Minster
- 264: Castle Cary – Keinton Mandeville
- 267: Bridport – Maiden Newton railway path
- 270: Devon Coast-to-Coast alternate braid
- 272: Devon: Ivybridge – Yelverton, also Ashburton and east
- 273: southern NCN3 braid near Holsworthy
- 274: Devon Coast-to-Coast alternate braid (Peter Tavy to Clearbrook)
- 275: North Devon coast (former RR)
- 276: North Devon coast (former RR)
- 277: North Devon coast (former RR)
- 278: Devon Coast-to-Coast Woolacombe braid

=== Zone 3 ===
- 305: Bugle, Cornwall
- 326: NCN3 inland braid to Truro
- 327: Launceston to Tavistock
- 334: south from Bristol
- 338: north from Taunton
- 339: Bridgwater – Langport – Ilminster
- 341: Exeter – Crediton
- 344: NCN3 alternate braid to Bampton

=== Zone 4 ===
- 403: North Wiltshire NCN4 braid
- 410: Avon Cycleway (Bristol Ring)
- 413: Evesham – Cheltenham NCN45 cut-off
- 416: Bristol – Yate
- 423: Cwmbran – Monmouth – Ross (former RR30 and Peregrine Path)
- 425: Rotherhithe – Camberwell
- 426: Skenfirth – Kentchurch
- 436: Dulais Valley, South Wales
- 437: South Wales to Glanaman
- 438: South Wales to Glanaman
- 439: South Wales to Glanaman
- 440: Milford Haven
- 442: Cotswold Line Cycle Route: Worcester – Evesham – Oxford
- 446: Carmarthen – Llandysul
- 447: Cardiganshire to Newcastle Emlyn
- 448: Crymych – Cardigan
- 451: Nantwich – Crewe – Sandbach
- 455: Oswestry – Ellesmere – Whitchurch (former RR31)
- 461: Slough / Eton Dorney
- 465: Pontypool – Hafodyrynys (- Crumlin); (Aberbeeg -) Cwm – Beaufort
- 466: Valleys
- 467: Valleys
- 468: (Trethomas -) Pengam – Abertysswyg (-) Rhymney – Bute Town
- 469: Bargoed – (Fochriw – Rhymney)
- 475: Caerphilly – Senghenydd
- 476: Trelewis – Taff Bargoed
- 477: Edwardsville – Merthyr Tydfil
- 478: Abercynon – Llwydcoed
- 481: Salisbury Plain NCN45 braid
- 482: Chiseldon – Marlborough NCN45 braid
- 485: Fosse2 link to Daventry
- 492: Cwmbran – Brynmawr

=== Zone 5 ===
- 523: Kenilworth – Balsall Common – Hampton-in-Arden
- 524: Nuneaton-Tamworth-Alrewas
- 525: North Warwickshire Cycleway (W) and Coventry link
- 526: North Warwickshire Cycleway (E)
- 533: Birmingham & Fazeley Canal
- 534: Sutton Coldfield Connect2 – Sutton Park to Castle Vale
- 535: Birmingham – Sutton Coldfield
- 536: Banbury – Towcester – Northampton – Thrapston
- 539: Northampton Norbital
- 544: Didcot – Wantage (former Regional Route 44)
- 547: south-east Peak District
- 548: Hartington – High Peak Trail
- 549: Etwall – Uttoxeter – Maniford Trail
- 550: Caldon Canal towpath
- 551: Newcastle-under-Lyme – Silverdale
- 552: Newport – Market Drayton (former RR75)
- 554: Lichfield – Hednesford link
- 555: Stoke – Kidsgrove via Trent & Mersey Canal towpath
- 558: South Manchester
- 559: Caldon Canal Leek Branch – the Roaches
- 561: Warrington – St Helens – Skelmerdale
- 562: Runcorn – Widnes – St Helens – Wigan – Southport
- 566: Anglesey north coast
- 568: Wirral – Hawarden Bridge – Chester (former Regional Route 89)
- 573: Congleton – Northwich (former Regional Route 73)
- 574: Sewell - Berkhamsted - Chesham
- 576: Rickmansworth – Chesham – Wendover
- 577: Witney – Carterton – Cricklade
- 585: former RR55 Redditch – Birmingham, and canal towpath to city centre

=== Zone 6 ===
- 622: Preston Guild Wheel (circular route)
- 627: Sheffield – Penistone – Kirkburton
- 633: Worthington – Ashby – Moira
- 636: Harrogate – Knaresborough, also known as the Beryl Burton cycleway
- 645: Sherwood Forest – Southwell
- 646: Carlton-le-Moorland, Lincolnshire
- 647: Lincoln – Worksop
- 648: Bakewell – Sherwood Forest
- 656: Coxwold – Osmotherly. The High Level Option of the White Rose route.
- 657: Easingwold – Upsall. Thirsk area loop
- 658: York northern city route
- 665: Wetherby – Tadcaster – York
- 668: north Leeds
- 672: Derby – Ilkeston greenway
- 674: Bluebell Way: Thurcroft – Woodsetts, link to Doncaster and Worksop
- 677: north Leeds (Roundhay Park)
- 680: Monsall Trail
- 688: Winterburn – Linton-on-Ouse. Way of the Roses central section
- 689: Huddersfield – Meltham
- 696: Airedale Greenway: Leeds and Liverpool Canal towpath Keighley – Shipley
- 697: Linesway Greenway: Castleford – Garforth
- 699: Huddersfield Narrow Canal east, and east from Dewsbury

=== Zone 7 ===
- 700: Bay Cycle Way: Glasson Dock – Walney Island
- 715: Barnard Castle – Bishop Auckland (Walney 2 Wear alternative)
- 725: Great North Cycleway: Darlington – Newcastle – Blyth
- 753: West Kilbride – Largs – Gourock
- 754: Bowling – Clydebank – Kirkintilloch – Falkirk – Linlithgow – Edinburgh (Forth and Clyde Canal & Union Canal)
- 756: East Kilbride – Rutherglen – Glasgow – Kelvindale (- Bishopbriggs)
- 764: Clackmannan – Dunfermline
- 765: Stirling – Bridge of Allan
- 766: Star of Markinch – Glenrothes – Kirkcaldy
- 767: Alloa – Tillicoultry – Dollar
- 768: Tullibody – Alva (- Tillicoultry)
- 775: Milnathort – Perth – Lochearnhead
- 776: Newburgh – Auchtermuchty – Falkland
- 777: Newburgh – Newport-on-Tay
- 780: Hebridean Way: Vatersay – Barra – Eriskay – Uist – Berneray – Lewis and Harris

=== Zone 8 ===
- 810: Liverpool – Ainsdale (former Regional Route 81) (out-of-zone number)
- 811: Valleys – Porth-Pontypridd (Rhondda Fach)
- 818: Llangurig NCN81 high level braid
- 819: Rhayader-Strata Florida southern braid
- 820: Llanwrtyd Wells – Strata Florida/NCN81
- 822: Aberaeron – Lampeter
- 825: Radnor Ring
- 862: Gellings Greenway: Kirkby – Knowsley (Liverpool)
- 881: Valleys (Rhondda Valley / Pontypridd – Maerdy)
- 882: Valleys (Rhondda Valley / Treorchy)
- 883: Valleys (Ogmore Valley)
- 884: Valleys (Garw Valley)
- 885: Bridgend – Maesteg – Afan Forest Park
- 887: Port Talbot – Pontrhydyfen – Afan Forest Park

== See also ==
- The National Byway: A non-Sustrans route, South West Scotland to South West England, 7,200 km (4,500 mi) in total.
