= National Cycle Route 64 =

Long distance cycle route through the English East Midlands

NCN Route 64
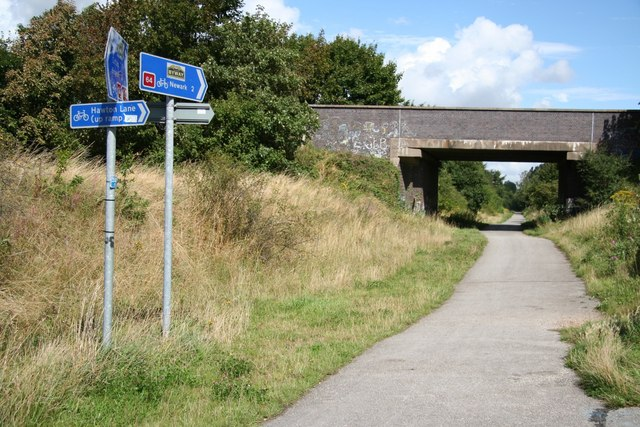
- Route 64 railway path in Newark on Trent
- Designation: UK National Cycle Network
- Trailheads: Market Harborough (south) to Lincoln (north)
- Use: Cycling
- Highest point: Owston, 191 m (627 ft)
- Lowest point: Lincoln, 4 m (13 ft)
- Website: sustrans.org.uk

National Cycle Network (NCN) Route 64 is a Sustrans National Route that runs from Market Harborough (52.477°N 0.915°W) to Lincoln (53.228°N 0.527°W). The route is 68 miles (109 km) in length and is fully open and signed in both directions. There are three sections to the route, NCN 63 and NCN 15 form the links between these sections.

== History ==
Between Cotham and Newark the route uses the track bed of the old Newark to Bottesford railway. From Harby to the outskirts of Lincoln the route is a railway path along the trackbed of the Lancashire, Derbyshire and East Coast Railway.

== Route ==
Route 64 starts in Market Harborough at a junction with NCN 6. It heads north through the Leicestershire countryside to Goadby where it is interrupted by NCN Route 63.

It restarts at Owston and Newbold and then passes through the centre of Melton Mowbray. It crosses into Lincolnshire at Woolsthorpe-by-Belvoir and stops shortly after when it meets NCN 15 on the toepath of the Grantham Canal.

Route 64 reappears at another junction with NCN 15 near Thoroton in Nottinghamshire and travels in a north easterly direction picking up the Newark to Cotham Railway Path, a traffic free route as far as Newark Northgate Station. From there the route follows country lanes to Harby where it joins the Lancashire, Derbyshire and East Coast Railway railway path to Lincoln, passing through the city centre to end at a junction with NCN 1,

== Related NCN routes ==
Route 64 meets the following routes:

- 6 at Market Harborough (52.4775°N 0.9155°W)
- 63 at Goadby (52.588°N 0.887°W) and Owston and Newbold (52.66°N 0.85°W)
- 15 at Woolsthorpe-by-Belvoir (52.906°N 0.7465°W) and Thoroton (52.9645°N 0.878°W)
- 647 at Harby (53.233°N 0.683°W)
- 1 at Lincoln (53.2275°N 0.527°W)
