= National Cycle Route 5 =

Cycle route from Berkshire to Anglesey

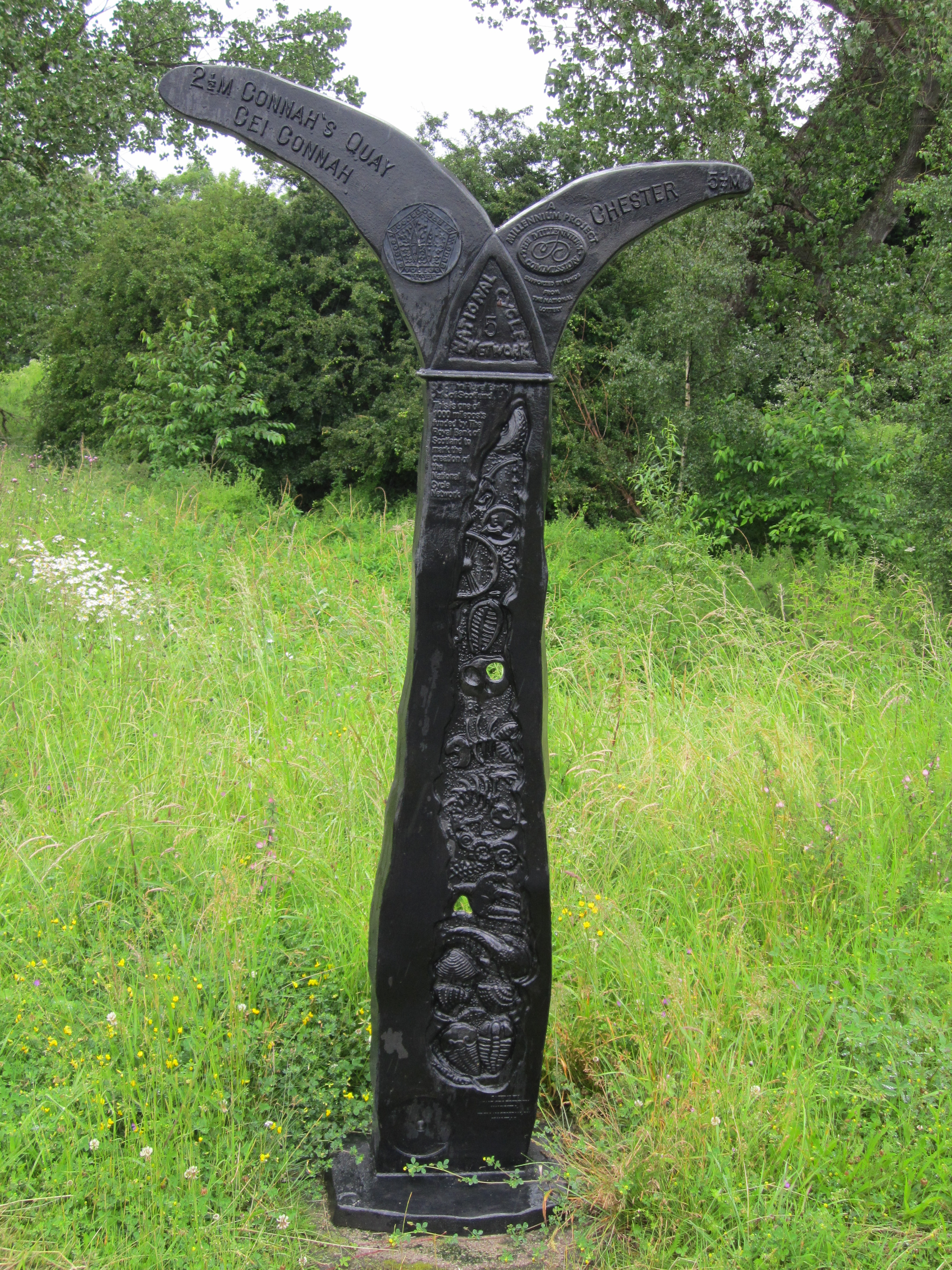
- A milepost on National Cycle Route 5 near Hawarden Bridge railway station, Shotton, Flintshire, Wales
- Location: United Kingdom
- Designation: UK National Cycle Network
- Trailheads: Reading (south) to Holyhead (north)
- Use: Cycling
- Waymark
- Surface: Varies from on-road to traffic-free tarmac to compacted surface
- Website: www.sustrans.org.uk/find-a-route-on-the-national-cycle-network/route-5/

National Cycle Route 5 (or NCR 5) is a route of the United Kingdom National Cycle Network, running from Reading to Holyhead.

== Route ==
=== Reading to Stratford upon Avon ===
Didcot | Abingdon-on-Thames | Radley | Oxford | Banbury | Stratford upon Avon

=== Stratford upon Avon to Birmingham ===
Stratford upon Avon | Redditch | Bromsgrove | Birmingham

This stretch of the NCR5 goes through the south of the West Midlands from Stratford-upon -Avon to Birmingham city centre.

NCR5 skirts around the town centre of Stratford-upon-Avon to join the tow path of the Stratford-upon-Avon Canal. If you wish to cycle through the historic town of Stratford-upon-Avon you can divert to National Cycle Route 41.

NCR5 leaves the towpath at Wilmcote and continues by road towards Coughton, passing Coughton Court and on towards Studley. The route leaves the roads and follows the trail along the River Arrow through the Arrow Valley Country Park. The route continues on along the river until a junction with National Cycle Route 55.

Re-joining the roads, NCR5 passes through Redditch town centre and past Redditch railway station. The route continues through the suburbs until opening out into country lanes heading towards Bromsgrove.

The NCR5 passes through suburbs towns Bromsgrove town centre where you can join National Cycle Route 46. Continuing on NCR5 takes you past the recreation ground and then through the suburbs until joining the Stourbridge Road and passing under the M42. The route then passes between the Lickey Hills and Waseley Hills to reach the first suburb of Birmingham, Rubery.

Continuing on to Longbridge, the NCR5 then joins the trail along the River Rea. Passing through Northfield until the route reaches the towpath at Kings Norton Junction where you can head south along the Stratford-upon-Avon Canal on the National Cycle Route 55 or head north to continue on NCR5.

The NCR5 continues along the towpath, before re-joining the River Rea trail and passing through parks and residential streets. The route cuts through Canon Hill Park and then heads on to the A38 and the Blue Cycle Superhighway which continues straight on to Birmingham City Centre and Birmingham New Street railway station.

=== Birmingham to Stoke-on-Trent ===
Birmingham | Walsall | Lichfield | Stafford | Stoke on Trent

This stretch of the NCR5 goes through the North of the West Midlands from Birmingham city centre to Stoke-on-Trent.

The NCR5 heads north from Birmingham New Street railway station and joins the Birmingham Canal towpath outside of the National Sea Life Centre, Birmingham. The route leaves the towpath near Smethwick Galton Bridge railway station, continuing on the towpath joins the National Cycle Route 81.

After a few residential streets the NCR5 passes through Sandwell Valley Country Park until it reaches the River Tame. To pass under the M6 the route weaves through roads, a park trail and a short section of towpath, diverting to the Rushall Canal. From here the NCR5 leaves the canal to pass through houses and continue to Walsall town centre. After going over the railway line, the path continues through a park and becomes a straight run for some distance. The route continues on to Lichfield.

At Lichfield the NCR5 is connected with National Cycle Route 54. However, there is a break in the route here between Lichfield and Stafford where the NCR5 restarts. From Stafford the route passes through Stone and continues to Stoke-on-Trent where the route has a junction with National Cycle Route 555.

=== Stoke-on-Trent to Chester ===
Stoke-on-Trent | Middlewich | Weaverham | Chester

The route has a junction with National Cycle Route 56 north of Chester Zoo.

=== Chester to Holyhead ===
Chester | Conwy | Bangor | Menai Bridge | Holyhead

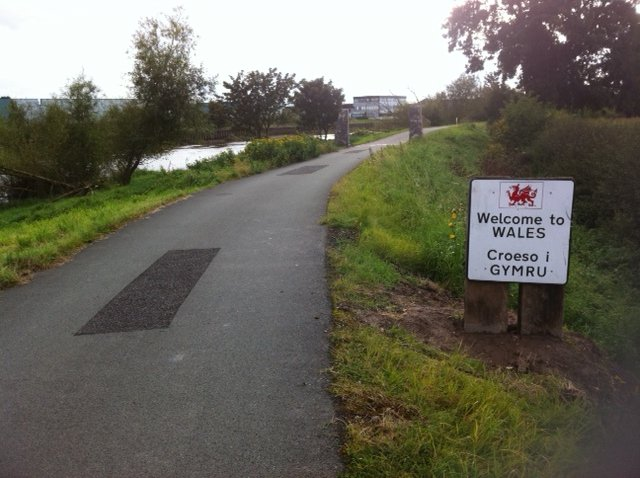
Approaching the Welsh border

The track leaves Chester (and England) on the Northern bank of the River Dee. Crossing into Wales, the high quality track crosses the Dee at the side of Hawarden Bridge and then enters the town of Shotton. At this stage the National Cycle Route heads inland and follows a series of quiet roads. Unfortunately the road surfaces are sometimes poor and gradients steep. There are plans to create a better quality route following the coast.

At Talacre the coastal route improves again. It passes through a large caravan site and golf course en route to Prestatyn. From Prestatyn westwards the route hugs the coast and in many places one is just a few metres from the sea.

The path continues through Rhyl where it crosses the River Clwyd and then to Kinmel Bay, Pensarn, Llanddulas, Colwyn Bay and Llandudno. The Llandudno promenade, although not on the official route, is a much better route than the official line which was created before the promenade was opened to cyclists after a long campaign.

The path was much improved West of Conwy in September 2012 by the creation of a traffic free cycle path which now bypasses a particularly dangerous stretch of the A55. Heading further west, the path is highly engineered around the Penmaenmawr area before following quiet lanes into Bangor.

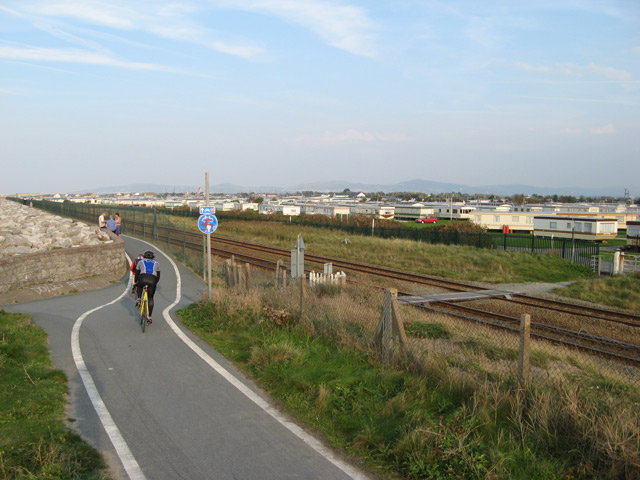
National Cycle Route 5/Wales Coast Path, Conwy

Since 2012, Wales Coast Path in North Wales follows part of the Reading to Holyhead National Cycle Route 5.

It crosses (with road traffic) the Menai Suspension Bridge and terminates in Holyhead. Much of the road across Anglesey follows country lanes rather than dedicated bike tracks.
