= National Cycle Route 26 =

- Length: 138 km (86 mi)
- Established: 1983
- Trailheads: Portishead (Somerset)
- Use: cycling
- Highest point: 750 ft (230 m)
- Lowest point: 0 ft (0 m)
- Season: All
- Months: All
- Waymark: Sustran's blue cycle waymarkers which have the number 26.
- Sights: The Strawberry Line
- Maintained by: Sustrans' National Cycle Network

National Route 26 of the National Cycle Network runs from Portishead on the Somerset coast to the Isle of Portland on the Dorset coast through Wells, Castle Cary, Yeovil, Weymouth and Dorchester. It also has many small villages along the way.

Some northern sections near Portishead and Cheddar have ongoing gaps where local groups are working to complete the path.

== Waymark ==
Sustran's blue cycle waymarkers which have the number 26. 26

== Routes ==
This route has several sections:

- Castle Cary to Glastonbury
- Yeovil to Sherborne
- Strawberry Line (Yatton to Cheddar)
