= All Saints' Church, Harby =

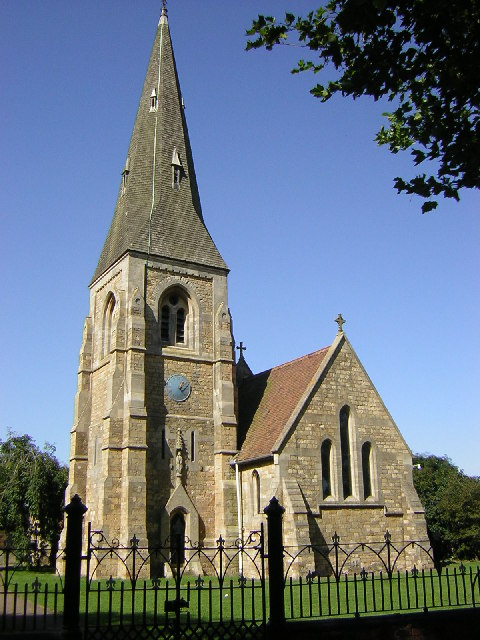
- All Saints' Church, Harby
- All Saints' Church, Harby
- 53°13′27.80″N 0°41′9.76″W
- OS grid reference: SK 87811 70512
- Location: Harby, Nottinghamshire
- Country: England
- Denomination: Church of England

History
- Dedication: All Saints
- Consecrated: 2 August 1877

Architecture
- Heritage designation: Grade II listed
- Architect: John Thomas Lee

Administration
- Diocese: Diocese of Southwell and Nottingham
- Archdeaconry: Newark
- Deanery: Newark and Southwell
- Parish: Langford

All Saints' Church, Harby is a Grade II listed parish church in the Church of England in Harby, Nottinghamshire.

== History ==
The church in Harby was endowed with a chantry chapel by King Edward I of England in 1294, following the death of Queen Eleanor nearby in 1290. However, the chapel was dissolved at the Reformation and the church became a chapel of ease to North Clifton.

By the middle of the 19th century, it was in a poor state of repair. John Thomas Lee of London was appointed as the architect for a new building. Construction in Early English style began in 1874 and it was consecrated on 2 August 1877. The old church was then demolished and some parts re-used in the new building. In the east wall of the tower is a statue in memory of Eleanor of Castile, Queen Consort of Edward I.

In 1963, the shingles on the spire were replaced with Canadian cedar. In January 2010 work began on renovating the roofs, incorporating insulation, a breathable membrane and all new tiles.

It is part of a group of parishes which includes

- St Bartholomew's Church, Langford
- St Giles' Church, Holme
- St Cecilia's Church, Girton
- St George the Martyr's Church, North & South Clifton
- All Saints' Church, Collingham
- St John the Baptist's Church, Collingham
- St Helena's Church, South Scarle
- Holy Trinity Church, Besthorpe
- St Helen's Church, Thorney
- All Saints' Church, Winthorpe

== See also ==
- Listed buildings in Harby, Nottinghamshire
