= National Cycle Route 647 =

Route of the National Cycle Network in the UK

NCN Route 647
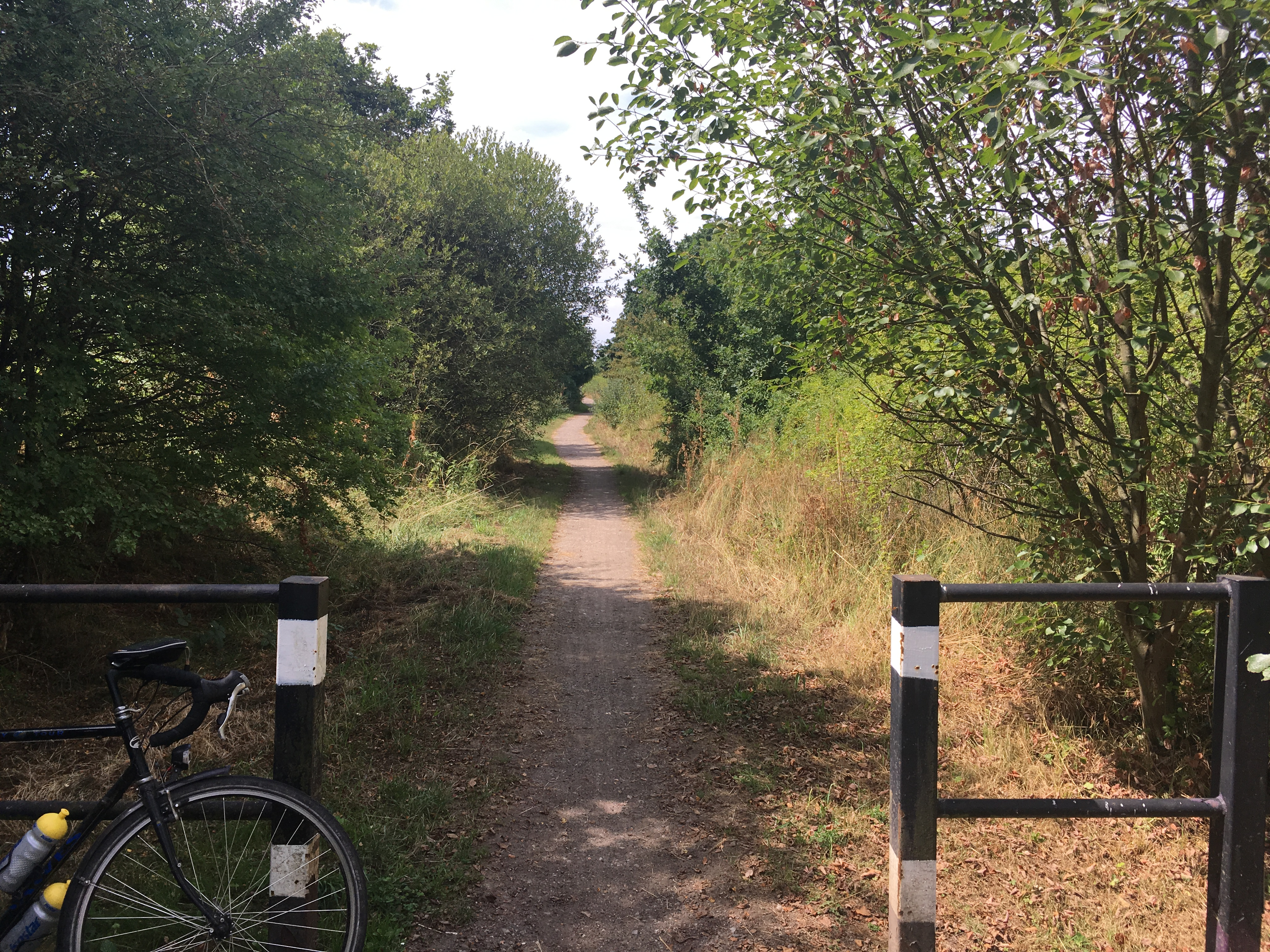
- NCN Route 647 eastern trailhead
- Length: 32 kilometre
- Designation: UK National Cycle Network
- Trailheads: Clumber Park (west) to Harby (east)
- Use: Cycling
- Highest point: Clumber Park, 75 m (246 ft)
- Lowest point: Harby, 6 m (20 ft)
- Difficulty: Easy
- Waymark
- Website: https://www.sustrans.org.uk/find-a-route-on-the-national-cycle-network/route-647/

National Cycle Network (NCN) Route 647 is a Sustrans National Route that runs from Clumber Park to Harby 53.233°N 0.683°W. The route is 19.6 miles (31.5 km) in length and is fully open and signed in both directions.

== History ==
The eastern end of the route is a railway path along the trackbed of the Lancashire, Derbyshire and East Coast Railway. It crosses the River Trent on the Fledborough Viaduct. Opened in 1897, it consists of 59 arches spread either side of four metal girder spans which cross the river itself. Nine million bricks were used in its construction.

== Route ==
NCN 647 is the core section of a Worksop to Lincoln cycleway. Worksop is 6 miles (9.7 km) along NCN Route 6 from the eastern trailhead and Lincoln 7 miles (11 km) from the western end and can be accessed via NCN Route 64. From its junction with NCN 6 it runs west through Gold Medal Wood before joining quite roads to pass through several North Nottinghamshire villages to reach the town of Tuxford, shortly after which it joins the railway path all the way to the junction with NCN 64.

== Related NCN routes ==
Route 647 meets the following routes:

- 6 at Clumber Park
- 64 at Harby 53.233°N 0.683°W
