= Listed buildings in Harby, Nottinghamshire =

Harby is a civil parish in the Newark and Sherwood district of Nottinghamshire, England. The parish contains three listed buildings that are recorded in the National Heritage List for England. All the listed buildings are designated at Grade II, the lowest of the three grades, which is applied to "buildings of national importance and special interest". The parish contains the village of Harby and the surrounding area. All the listed buildings are in the village, and they consist of a church, a war memorial in the churchyard, and a windmill converted for residential use.

== Buildings ==
Name and location	Photograph	Date	Notes
All Saints' Church, wall, railings and gate 53.22442°N 0.68614°W		1875–76	The church is built in limestone with dressings in Ancaster stone, it has tile roofs, and is in Early English style. It consists of a nave with a south porch, a chancel, a north vestry and a southeast steeple. The steeple has a tower with three stages, clasping buttresses, and a gabled recess containing a memorial to Eleanor of Castile under a crocketed canopy carved by Thomas Earp. The tower is surmounted by an octagonal shingled broach spire with two tiers of canopied lucarnes and a weathervane. The churchyard wall is in brick with cast iron coping, wrought iron railings and a gate.
Windmill; 53.22671°N 0.68738°W		c. 1877	The windmill, which has been converted for residential use, is in brick on a plinth, with a cogged cornice, and consists of a circular tapering tower with five stages. It contains doorways, and casement windows with cast iron frames.
War memorial 53.22434°N 0.68576°W		1920	The war memorial is in the churchyard of All Saints' Church. It is in stone, and consists of a square tapering obelisk on a two-tiered rectangular tapering plinth and a rectangular base. On two faces of the plinth are a carved wreath in relief, and on another face is a metal plaque with an inscription and the names of those lost in the First World War.
