= Strawberry Line (miniature railway) =

Miniature railway near Keynsham, England

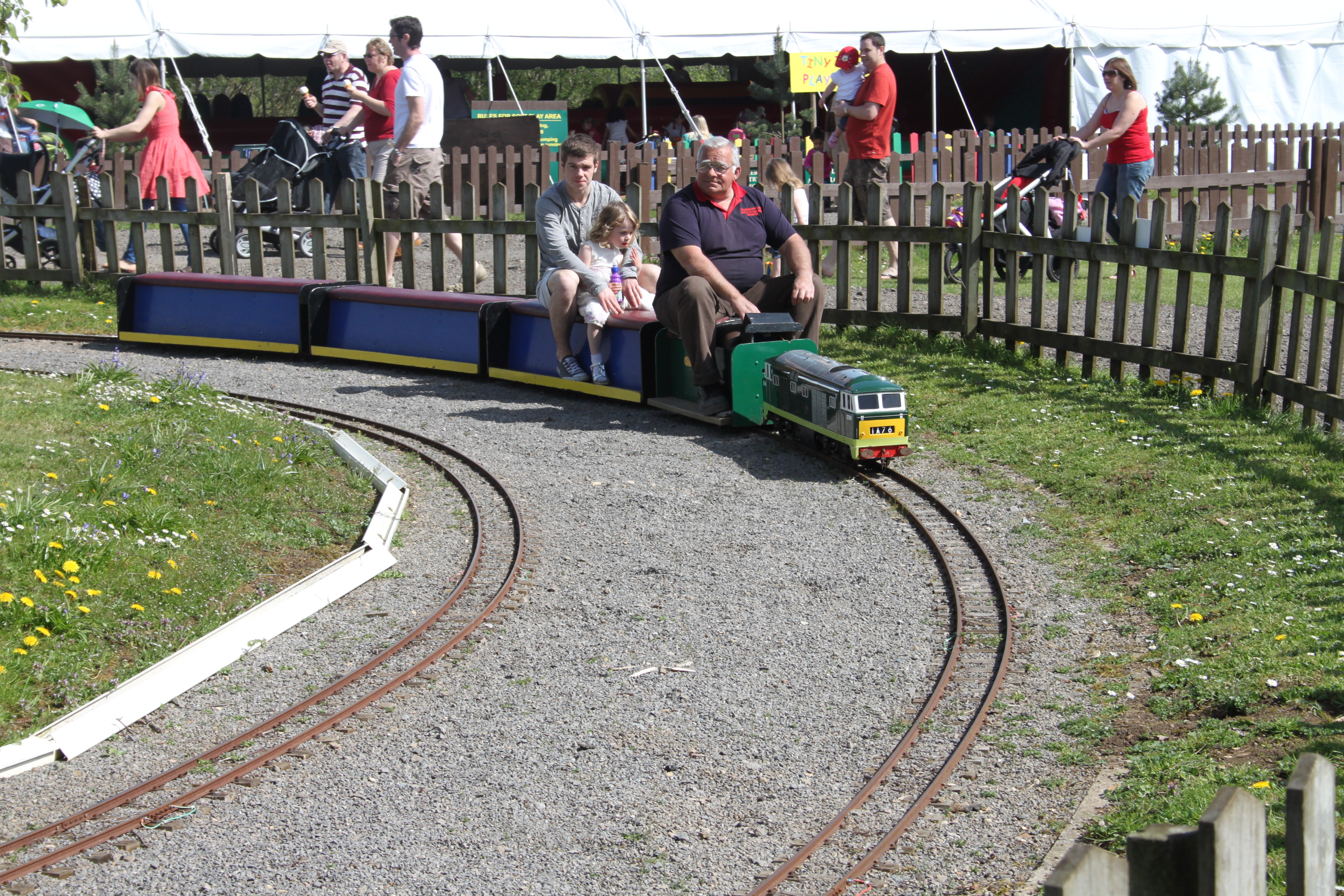

Overview
- Locale: Avon Valley Country Park, Keynsham, England
- Coordinates: 51.4171°N 2.4749°W

History
- Opened: 1999

Technical
- Line length: 0.75 mi (1.21 km)
- Track gauge: 5 in (127 mm)

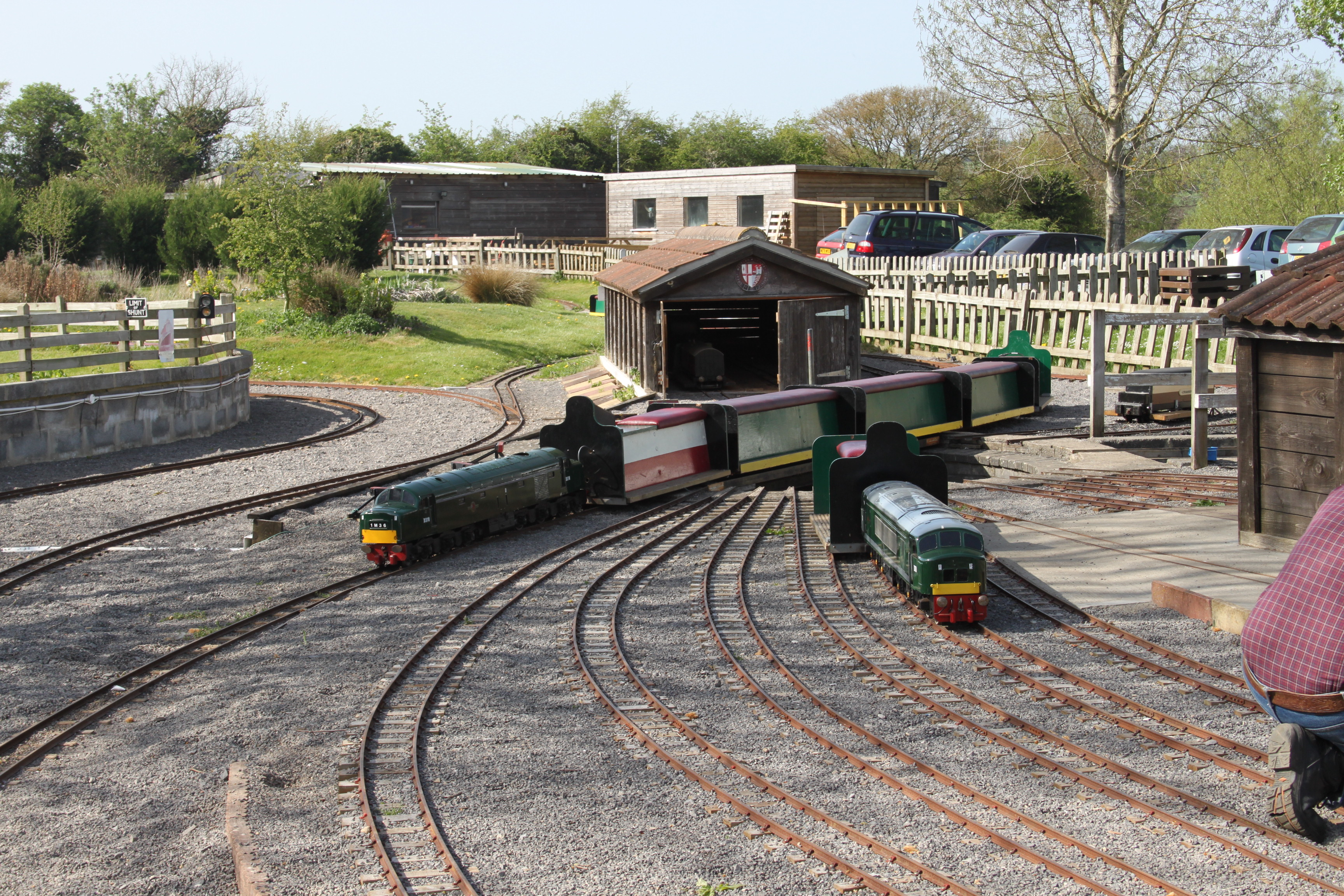
Track view

The Strawberry Line is a 0.75-mile (1.21 km) length of 7 1/2 in (190.5 mm) gauge railway inside Avon Valley Country Park (near Keynsham). It was Britain's only commercial ground-level 5 in (127 mm) railway until it became a 7.5inch gauge in 2020; it is now dual-gauge so the 5 in remains. As a conventional ridable miniature railway it provides train rides for visitors to the park now included in the price of admission since it was taken over by the park in 2018. It now runs mainly one train, a large electric mock steam train, although it also owns a small electric one, a traditional steam train, and a larger petrol train. Since the refurbishment, it has been operated by a team of park rangers.

== History ==
The railway was started at the Avon Valley Country Park in May 1999, with the first trains running on a 150 feet (46 m) demonstration track. A trackbed was roughed out in June and the first services ran on the new 900 feet (270 m) track in August 1999. A 60 feet (18 m) tunnel was added in 2003.Since the park’s takeover in 2018, it was converted to a dual gauge of 5 inch and 7.5 inch. Since the refurbishment, the tunnel is no longer used on the circuit and is now used as a storage tunnel, but there are talks of using the old 5 inch track and doing tunnel runs for a small extra cost, as well as running the free main track, so that the railway can generate some independent income for upkeep and repairs to the track and trains.

== The railway ==
An area is set aside for the coaling and preparation of steam locomotives, including a fire-dropping pit.

The whole railway was resignalled by 2006 with track circuits replacing the treadle-operated signalling system. The signalling recreates the prototypical railway operational scenario, with signals not clearing unless the section ahead, or the intersecting line, is clear.
