= National Cycle Route 17 =

Cycle route in the United Kingdom

Coordinates: 51°18′41″N 0°30′52″E

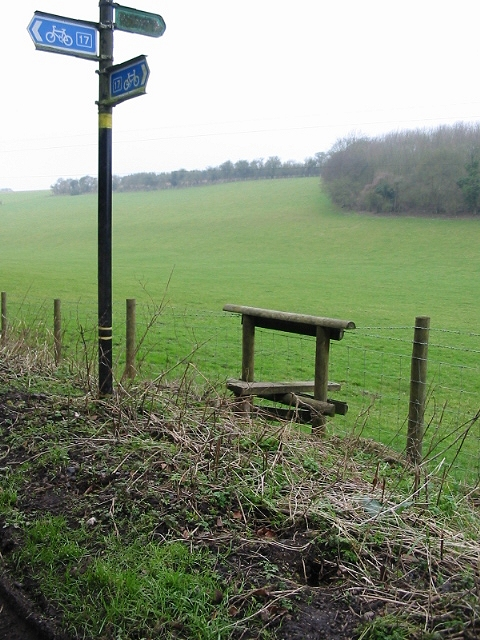
Fingerpost and stile

National Cycle Route 17 is part of the United Kingdom's National Cycle Network. It presently runs southwards from Rochester, via Maidstone to Ashford where it links with National Cycle Route 18.

The route is open and is signed between Rochester and Maidstone, with the rest due for development. It leads from Rochester, via mainly minor roads, towards Blue Bell Hill, where it meets the North Downs Way (long distance footpath), both routes follow the Pilgrim's Way to Detling.

There is also a spur line down to the county town of Maidstone. The Pilgrim's Cycle Trail carries on towards Hollingbourne, after which it becomes traffic free towards (above Harrietsham, then via minor roads to Charing. It then heads to Westwell, Kent, and then via traffic-free route to Ashford, via Kennington, Kent.

In Ashford, it meets National Route 18 heading to the town centre, the route then heads out of Ashford via Sevington.

In future, it will continue to the south coast, through Bonnington and then (near Newchurch, Kent), it will link with National Cycle Route 2 between Folkestone and Lydd. Heading west, it will follow the approximate line of the North Downs Way National Trail entering Surrey.
