= National Cycle Route 169 =

Cycle route in the United Kingdom

National Cycle Network (NCN) Route 169 is a Sustrans Regional Route that runs through Scunthorpe in the United Kingdom. It is 5 miles (8.0 km) long, fully open and signed. It is also known as the Scunthorpe Ridgeway.

== History ==
Construction of the path is the realisation of a plan by Sir Patrick Abercrombie, a noted town planner who once worked in town planning in Scunthorpe. A path along the Ridgeway has been in place since the 1970s. It was developed into a NCN route with the construction of two bridges. The first bridge opened in 2011 and spanned Bridges Road. Opened the following year, the second crosses West Common Lane.

== Route ==
The northern trailhead is at Normanby Hall Country Park. It runs south through Crosby and Hempdykes to Riddings and its southern trailhead at Greenacre Park Bottesford with an extension from Manor Park completed in May 2022. The route follows a north–south jurassic escarpment.

== Related NCN routes ==
NCN 169 is isolated from the rest of the National Cycle Network.
