= National Cycle Route 15 =

Cycle route in the United Kingdom

Coordinates: 52.9461°N 1.0732°W

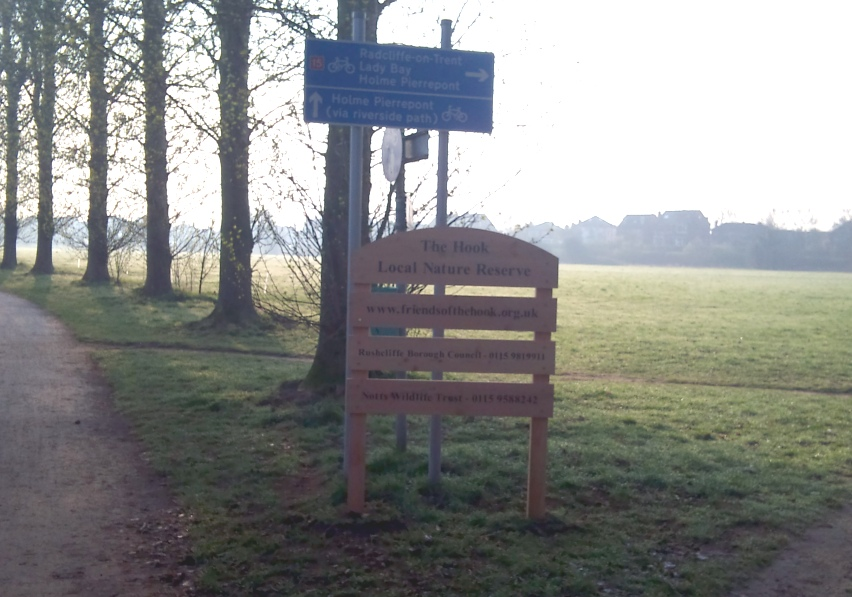
NCR 15 sign at the entrance to The Hook, West Bridgford

National Cycle Route 15 is part of the National Cycle Network in the East Midlands which, when complete, will run from National Cycle Route 1 near Tattershall in Lincolnshire to Castle Donington in Derbyshire via Sleaford, Grantham, and Nottingham.

== Route ==
The route is currently opened in a small number of locations and covers a range of roads, cycle paths, and shared use paths.

Sections of NCN 15 which were signed at the end of 2010

=== Wilford to Bingham ===
Wilford | West Bridgford | Radcliffe-on-Trent

From the Wilford Toll Bridge the route follows the River Trent past Trent Bridge before joining lightly trafficked roads between Lady Bay and Radcliffe-on-Trent via the Holme Pierrepont National Watersports Centre.

From Radcliffe-on-Trent to Saxondale the route continues alongside the A52, before continuing alongside the former A52 through Saxondale itself then crossing the duelled A46 on bridleway bridge opened in 2012.

Between Gamston and Radcliffe-on-Trent the route remains signed along its former alignment on the shared use paths adjacent to the A52.

=== Bingham to Bottesford ===
Bingham | Whatton | Aslockton | Orston | Bottesford

This section runs from the A46 Fosse Way on cycle lanes and shared use paths through Bingham and along the A52 to Whatton where it leaves the A52 and runs on lightly trafficked roads through to Bottesford - for half the route between Aslockton and Orston it shared the road with National Cycle Route 64.

=== Muston to Grantham ===
Muston | Grantham

This sections runs along the Grantham Canal towpath.
