= Avon Valley Country Park =

Country park in England

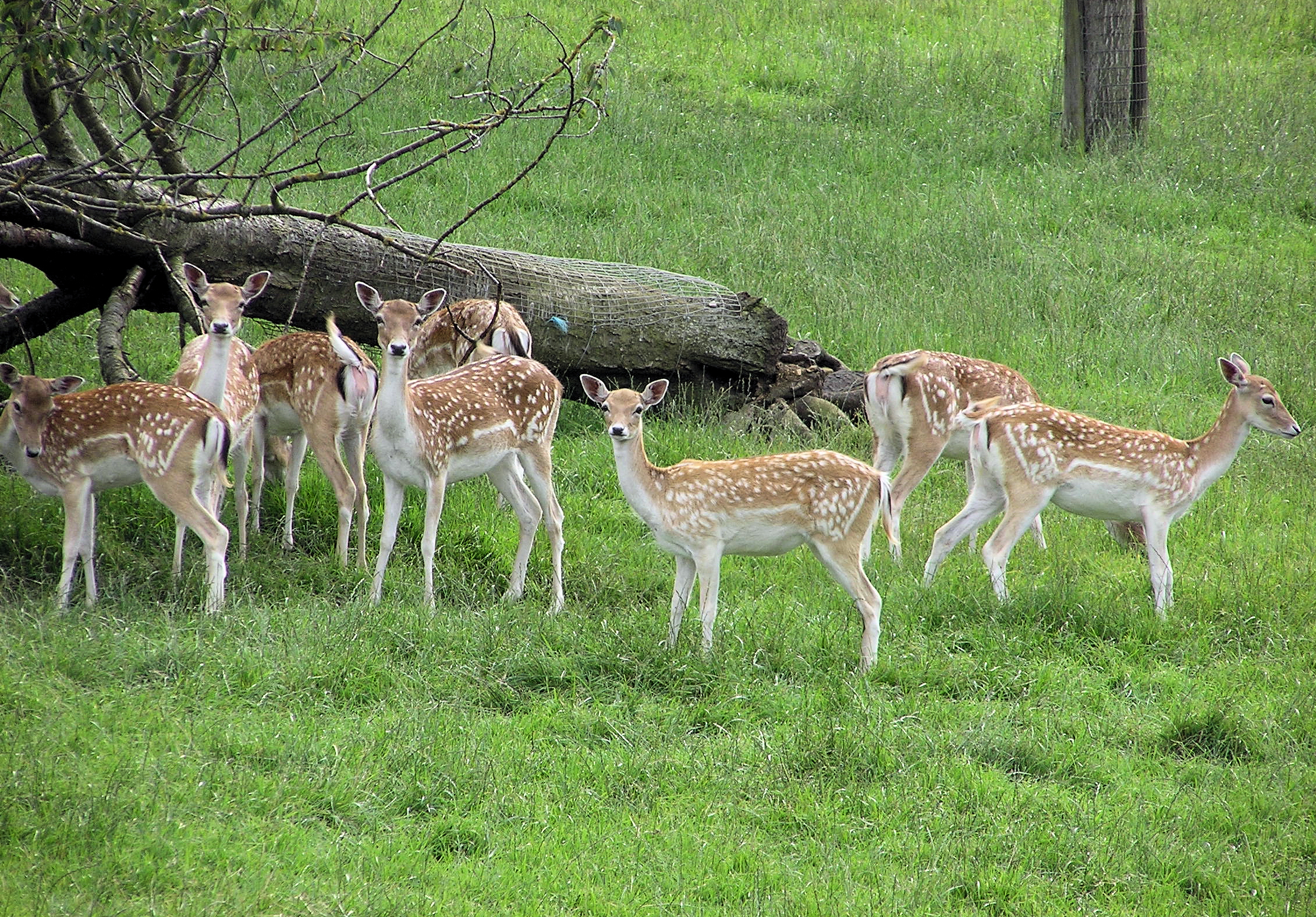
- Fallow Deer in the park

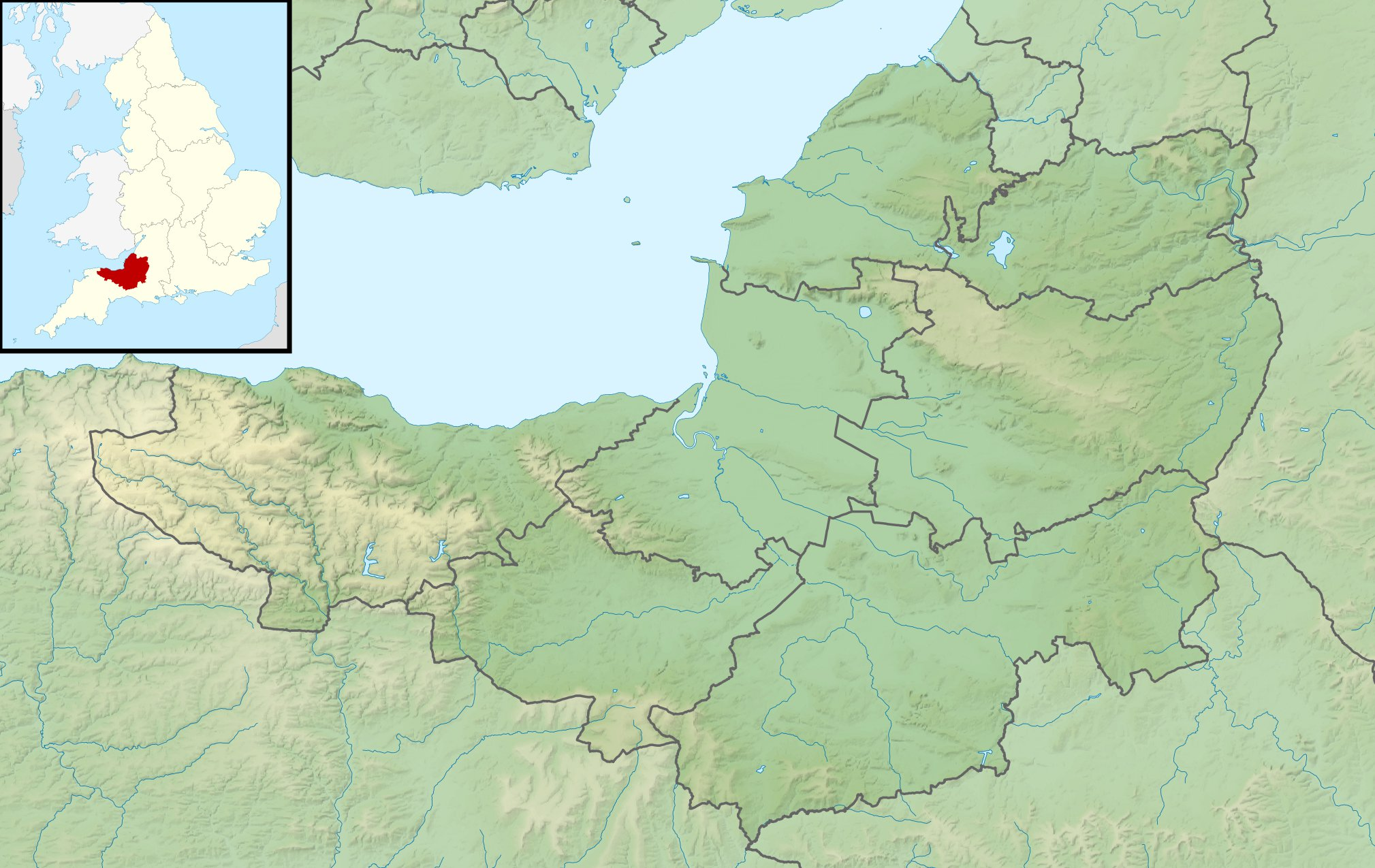
- Location within Somerset
- Interactive map of Avon Valley Country Park
- Type: Country park
- Location: Keynsham, Somerset, England
- Coordinates: 51°25′02″N 2°28′30″W
- Area: 50 acres (20 ha)
- Created: 1976

Avon Valley Country Park is a 50-acre (20 ha) country park in Keynsham, Somerset, England.

The park offers a variety of rides for children including Chair-o-planes, a small children's chair swing, Dino Jeeps (a dirt track with dinosaur animatronics where children drive miniature electric jeeps), the Big Red, an outdoors drop slide, the Strawberry Line Miniature Railway, and the Play Barn (a big indoor softplay area with a drop slide which is taller than the outside one). There are also animals in Pets' Corner and the Animal Barn.

The site was common grazing land in the 15th century and later became a farm. In 1976, it was purchased as a "pick-your-own" fruit farm and subsequently developed into the country park.

== Miniature railway ==
Within the park is the Strawberry Line, a 0.75-mile (1.21 km) length of 5 in (127 mm) gauge railway. It is Britain's only commercial ground-level 5 in gauge railway. It opened in 1999 and now has one steam and 10 mock diesel engines which are battery operated.
