= National Cycle Route 56 =

Cycle route from Chester to Liverpool in England

NCN Route 56
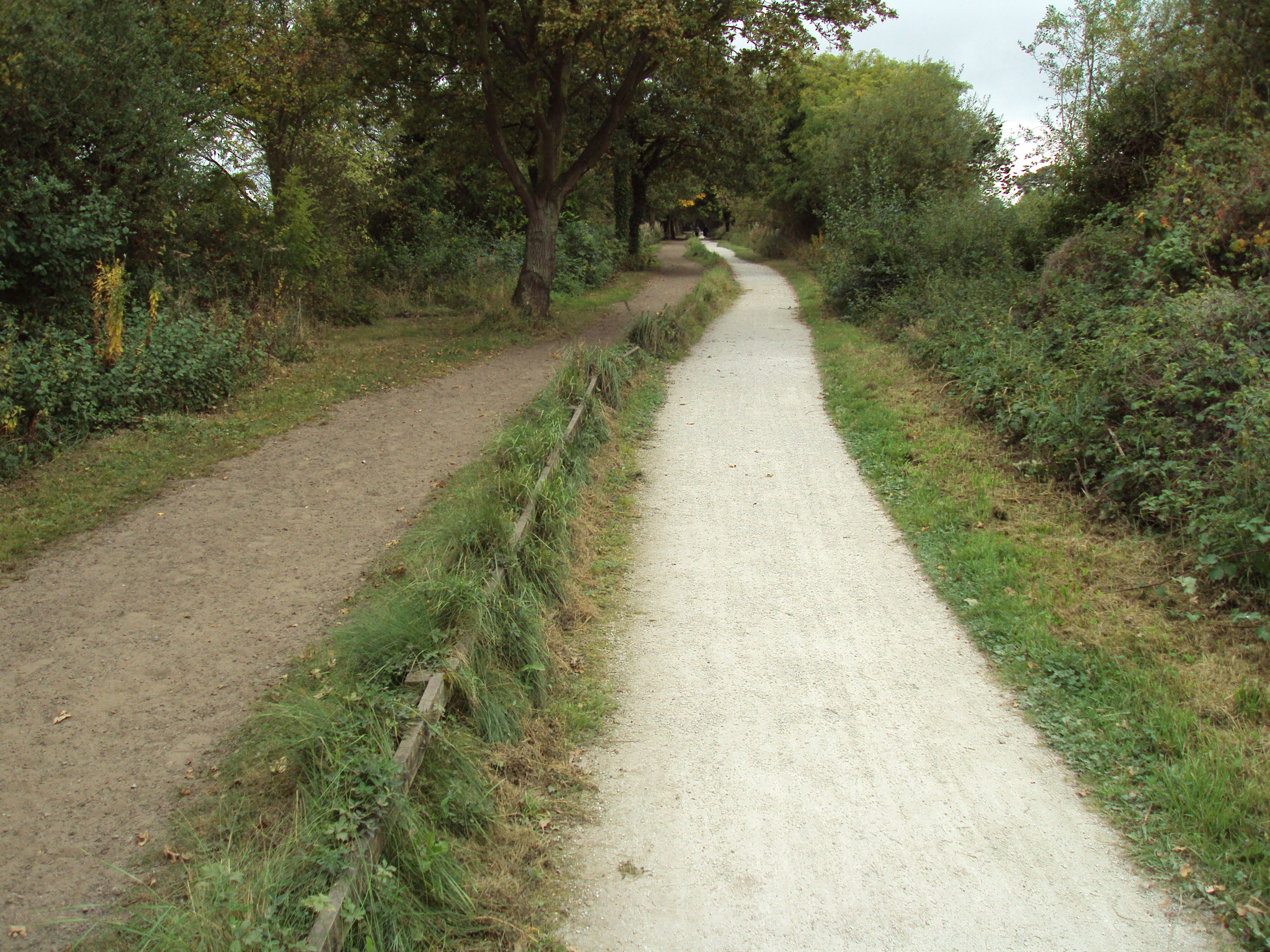
- The Wirral Way on Route 56
- Length: 44 miles (71 km)
- Designation: National Cycle Network
- Trailheads: North: Liverpool; South: Chester
- Website: www.sustrans.org.uk

National Cycle Network (NCN) Route 56 is a Sustrans National Route that runs from Chester to Liverpool. The route utilises country lanes, a former railway trackbed, a coastal path and a seaside promenade.

== Route ==
=== Chester to Hooton ===
The route begins north of Chester Zoo at a junction with National Cycle Route 5. The route travels through Backford, Dunkirk, Capenhurst and Ledsham to the outskirts of Hooton.

=== Hooton to Parkgate ===
The route follows the former railway trackbed of the Wirral Way, in Wirral Country Park, through Willaston, where it passes the former Hadlow Road railway station, and Neston to Parkgate.

=== Parkgate to Leasowe ===
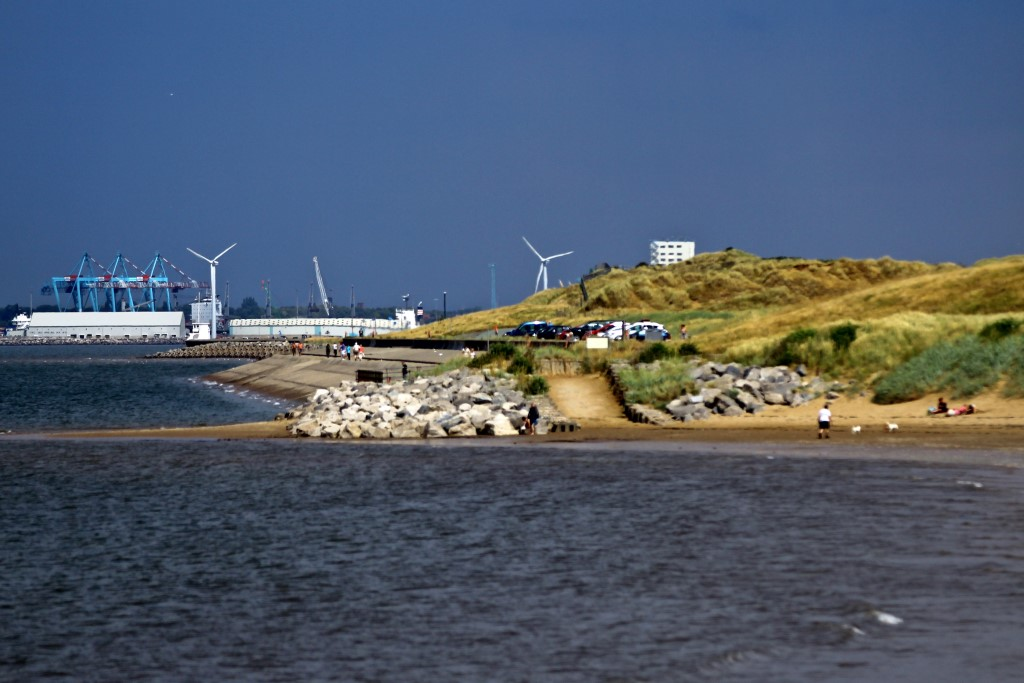
The Gunsite at Leasowe.

The route travels inland from Parkgate to Thornton Hough where it then travels along the centre of Wirral, northwards through Brimstage, Storeton, Landican, Woodchurch, Upton, Beechwood, Bidston and the outskirts of Leasowe where it meets the Irish Sea at the Gunsite.

=== Leasowe to Seacombe ===
The route follows the pathway along the North Wirral Coastal Park eastwards, from Leasowe, before entering New Brighton. The route then turns south along Egremont promenade before reaching Seacombe.

=== Liverpool ===
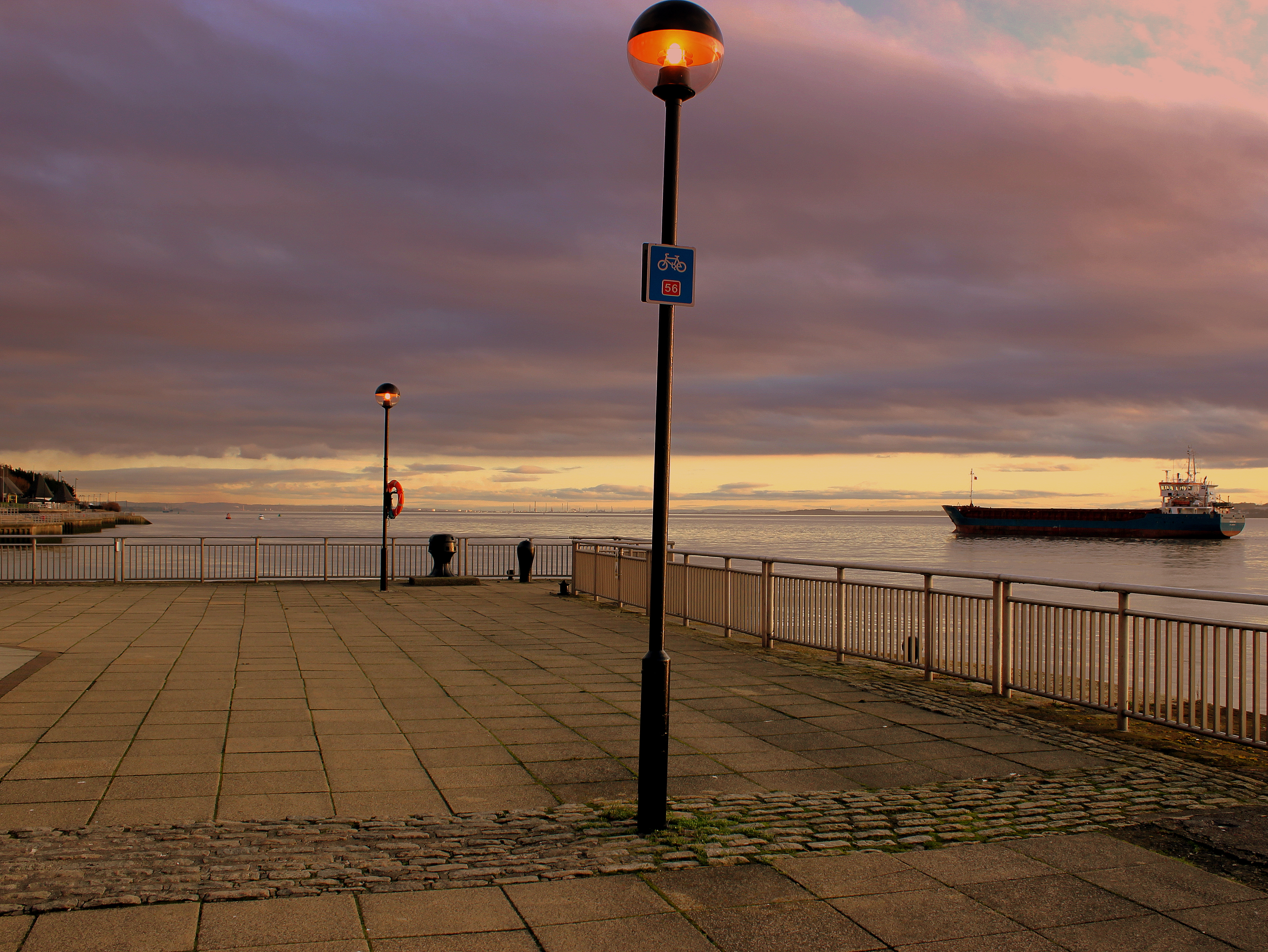
Armstrong Quay, off Riverside Drive, Liverpool

After travelling across the River Mersey, the route splits into two, around the centre of Liverpool, before joining with National Cycle Route 62 at Childwall.

== See also ==
- National Cycle Network
- Sustrans
