= National Cycle Route 166 =

Cycle route in the United Kingdom

NCN Route 166
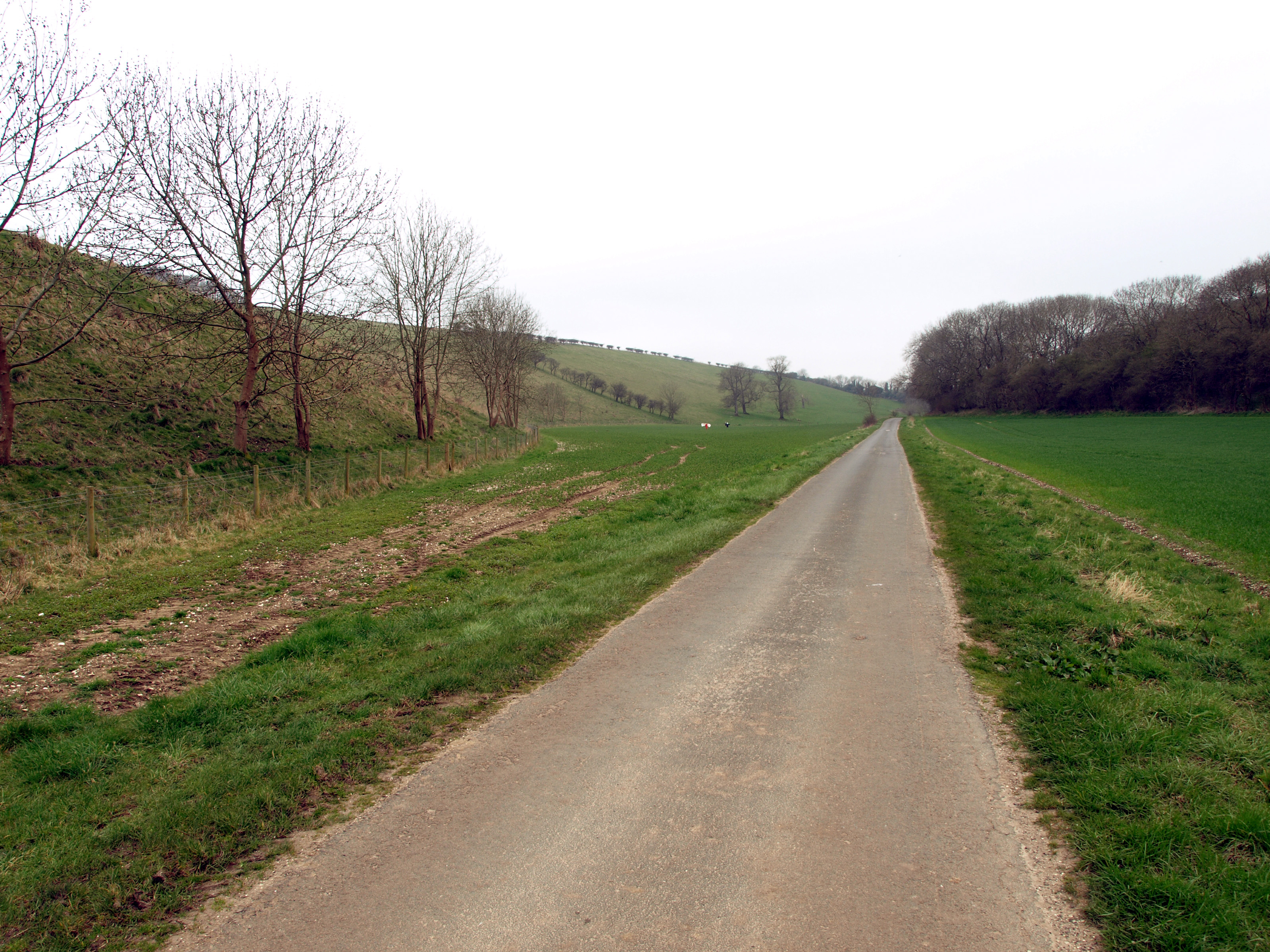
- Route 166 in the Yorkshire Wolds near Fordon
- Length: 61 km (38 mi)
- Designation: UK National Cycle Network
- Trailheads: Kirkham (west) to Hunmanby (east)
- Use: Cycling
- Elevation gain/loss: 535 metres (1,760 ft) gain 510 metres (1,670 ft) loss
- Highest point: Settrington Beacon, 201 m (659 ft)
- Lowest point: Menethorpe, 20 m (66 ft)
- Waymark
- Website: sustrans.org.uk
Trail map

National Cycle Network (NCN) Route 166 is a Sustrans regional route in the Yorkshire Wolds between Kirkham and Hunmanby. It is one of 5 NCN routes that make up the 146 mile Yorkshire Wolds Cycle Route. Created in 2011 it is fully open and signed.

== Route ==
The entire 61 kilometres (38 mi) route is on road, along quiet country lanes. The western end is at Kirkham, North Yorkshire, where it joins the north western end of NCN 167. It passes through the town of Norton-on-Derwent and then the villages of Settrington, Duggleby, Kirby Grindalythe, Sledmere, Weaverthorpe and Foxholes on its way to its eastern end at Hunmanby. Here it meets NCN 1.

The Yorkshire Wolds is a rolling landscape, flat sections are few. There is an accumulated ascent of 535 metres (1,760 ft) and 510 metres (1,670 ft) of accumulated descent.

Heading east, the steeper gradients are the climbs from Foxholes and from Settrington. Here the route climbs a scarp slop to its high point at Settrington Beacon. The village is 50 metres (160 ft) above sea level, and the route rises to 200 metres (660 ft) in 3 kilometres (1.9 mi). Westward, the climbs are gentler dip slopes with the climb from Duggleby to Settrington Beacon being the only significant challenge.

== Related NCN Routes ==
Route 166 meets the following routes:

- 167 at Kirkham 54.0829°N 0.873°W
- 1 at Hunmanby 54.182°N 0.3255°W

NCN 166 is part of the Yorkshire Wolds Cycle Route with:

- 164
- 66
- 1
- 167
