= National Cycle Route 164 =

Cycle route in Yorkshire Wolds, England

NCN Route 164
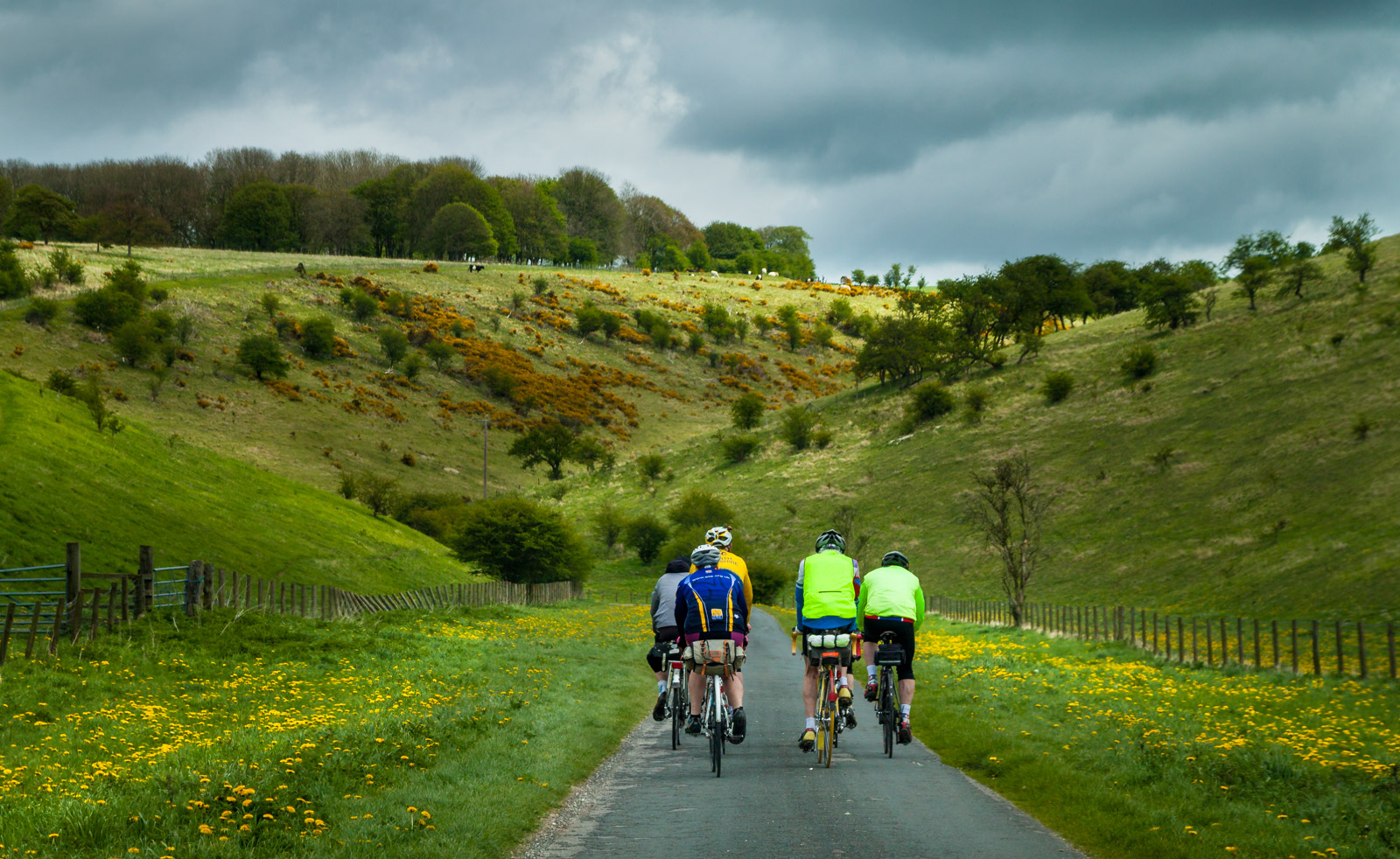
- Length: 51 km (32 mi)
- Location: Yorkshire
- Established: 2011
- Designation: National Cycle Network
- Trailheads: Pocklington 66 53.93°N 0.776°W; Hutton Cranswick 1 53.954°N 0.5°W; Kiplingcotes 66 53.884°N 0.592°W; Beverley 1 53.84°N 0.43°W
- Use: Cycling
- Elevation gain/loss: 375 metres (1,230 ft) gain 425 metres (1,390 ft) loss
- Highest point: Huggate, 191 m (627 ft)
- Lowest point: Beverley, 9 m (30 ft)
- Waymark
- Website: https://www.sustrans.org.uk/find-a-route-on-the-national-cycle-network/route-164/

National Cycle Network (NCN) Route 164 is a Sustrans regional route in the Yorkshire Wolds. The Northern section between Pocklington and Hutton Cranswick is part of the Way of the Roses, opened in 2010. The southern section links Beverley and Kiplingcotes via Newbold. Both sections are key parts of the 146 mile Yorkshire Wolds Cycle Route, opened in 2011. It is fully open and signed.

== Route ==
=== Pocklington to Hutton Cranswick ===
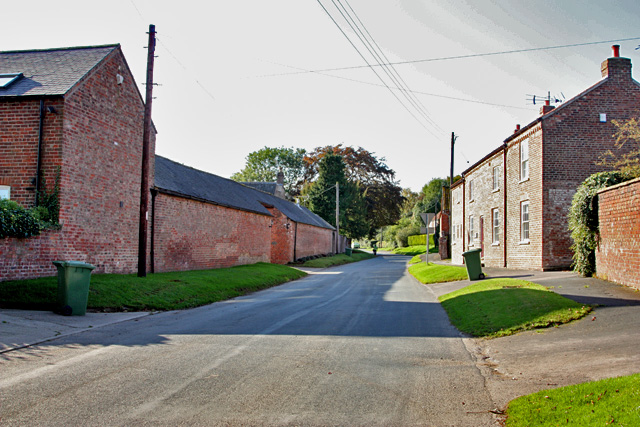
Tibthorpe, Main Street

The northern section is entirely on road using quiet country lanes. Its western end is in Pocklington in the Vale of York. The route climbs up the Yorkshire Worlds through Millington Dale. It is a gentle climb compared to most of the roads up the scarp slope of the wold. The village of Huggate is shortly after the top of the climb. The route runs downhill to the Holderness Plain. Its eastern end is about two miles west of Hutton Cranswick where it meets NCN 1.

=== Kiplingcotes to Beverley ===
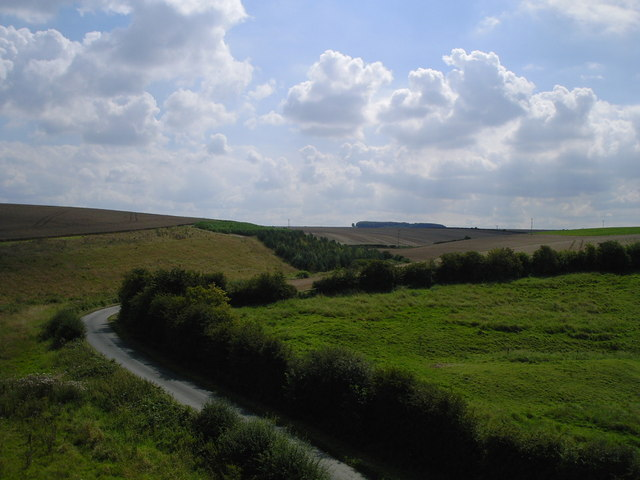
Kiplingcotes Lane

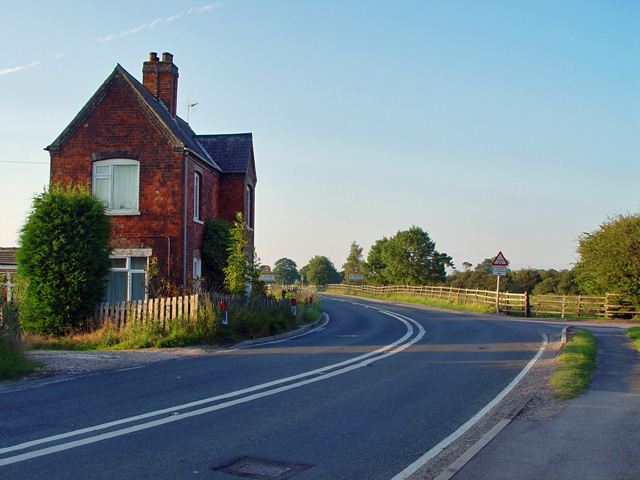
Walkington Gate house, Beverley Westwood

The western end of the southern section is in Kiplingcotes at a junction with NCN 66. The route heads south to Newbold, with steep roads in and out, then turns east to Walkington, Beverley Westwood. Its eastern end is in Beverley at a junction with NCN 1.

== Related NCN Routes ==
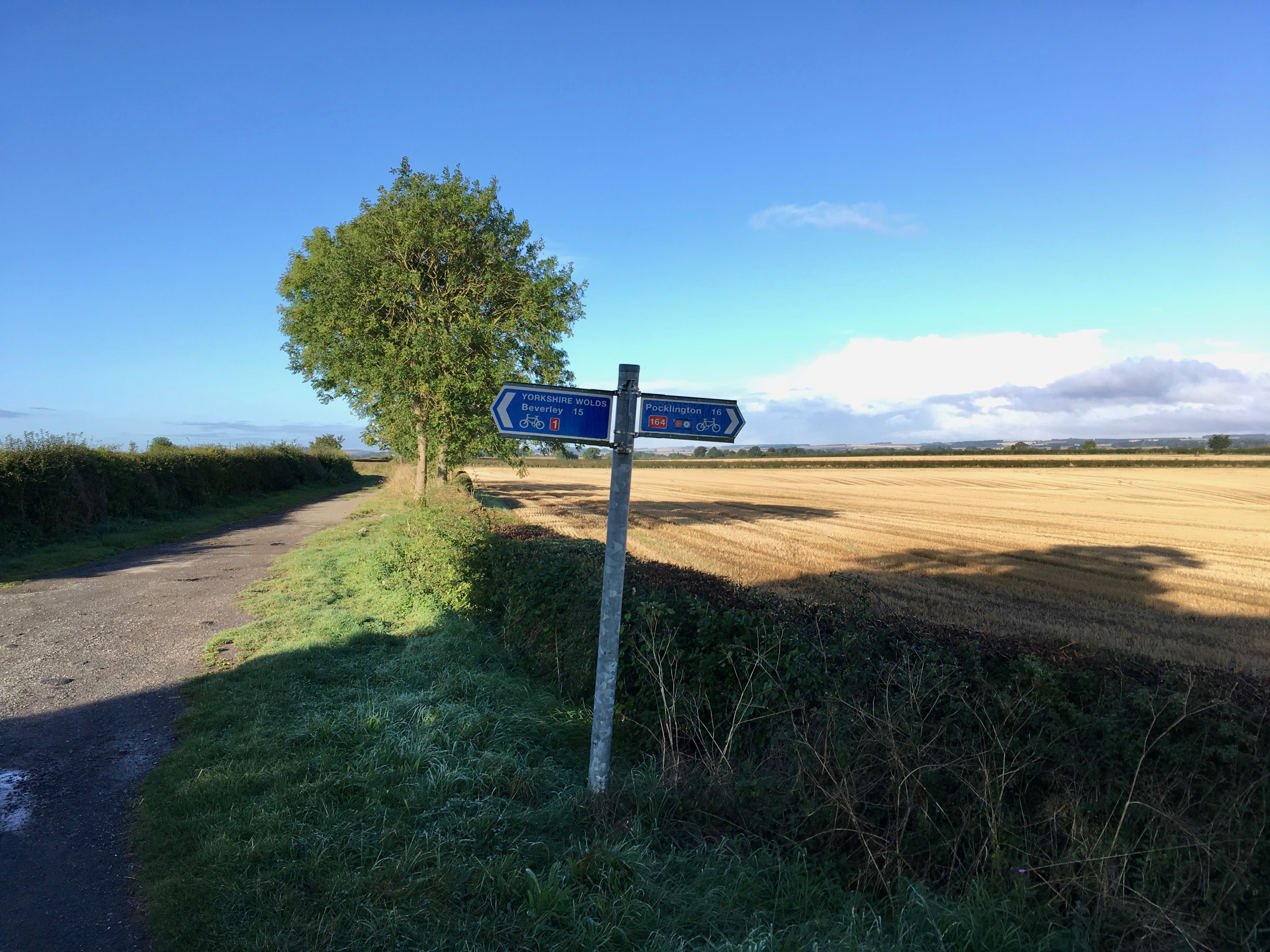
Junction of National Cycle Network routes 1 and 164

Route 164 meets the following routes:

- 1 at Hutton Cranswick 53.9539°N 0.498°W and Beverley 53.8406°N 0.429°W
- 66 at Pocklington 53.9309°N 0.7758°W and Kiplingcotes 53.8835°N 0.5921°W
- 167 at Huggate 53.984°N 0.6636°W

Route 164 (northern section) is part of the Way of the Roses along with:

69 68 688 65 658 66 1

Route 164 is part of the Yorkshire Wolds Cycle Route with:

66 1 166 167
