= National Cycle Route 167 =

Cycle route in the United Kingdom

National Cycle Network (NCN) Route 167 is a Sustrans regional route in the Yorkshire Wolds between Kirkham and Huggate. It is one of 5 NCN routes that make up the 146 mile Yorkshire Wolds Cycle Route. Created in 2011 it is fully open and signed.

== Route ==
The entire route is on road, along quiet country lanes. The north western end is at Kirkham, where is joins the western end of NCN 166. It passes through the villages of Westow, Leavening and Thixendale on its way to its south eastern end at Huggate. Here it meets the northern section of NCN 164. The Yorkshire Wolds is a rolling landscape, there are very few flat sections in this route.

The steepest gradients are the climbs out of Leavening and Thixendale when cycling towards Huggate.

Sustrans aims to extend the route north to Malton and Pickering.

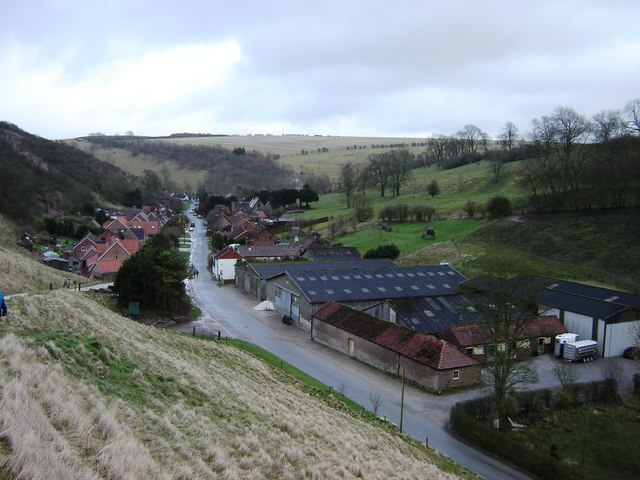
Passing through Thixendale

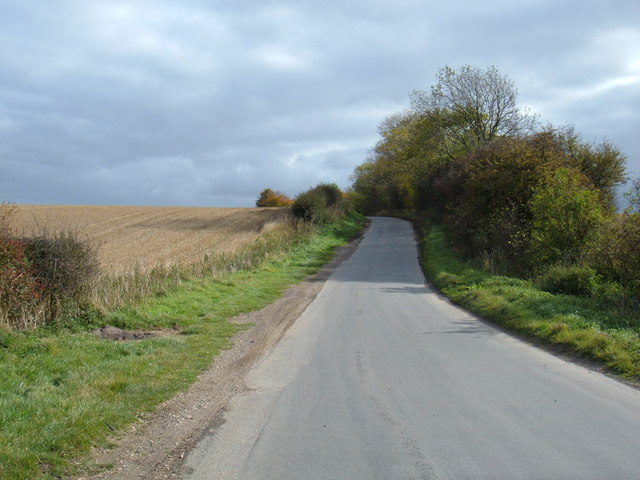
Road towards Huggate

== Related NCN Routes ==
Route 167 meets the following routes:

- 166 at Kirkham 54.0829°N 0.873°W
- 164 at Huggate 53.984°N 0.6636°W

NCN 167 is part of the Yorkshire Wolds Cycle Route with:

- 164
- 66
- 1
- 166
