= National Cycle Route 155 =

Cycling and pedestrian path in Northumberland, England

National Cycle Network (NCN) Route 155 is a Sustrans regional route in Northumberland. Running from the North Sea coast at Newbiggin due west to Morpeth. The 90% of this 8 mile route uses shared cycle/pedestrian verge-side paths. There is a small on-road section in Ashington. The route is fully signed and open.

== Route ==
Starting at the sea front in Newbiggin, NCN 155 begins to climb at a very gentle gradient as it passes through Ashington. It reaches it high point, 65m above sea level, between Pegswood and Morpeth. From this point there is a steep descent down to Morpeth where the route ends.

== Related NCN Routes ==
Route 155 crosses 1 at Ashington 55.18755°N 1.54245°W.
