= National Cycle Route 636 =

Cycling route in North Yorkshire, England

NCN Route 636
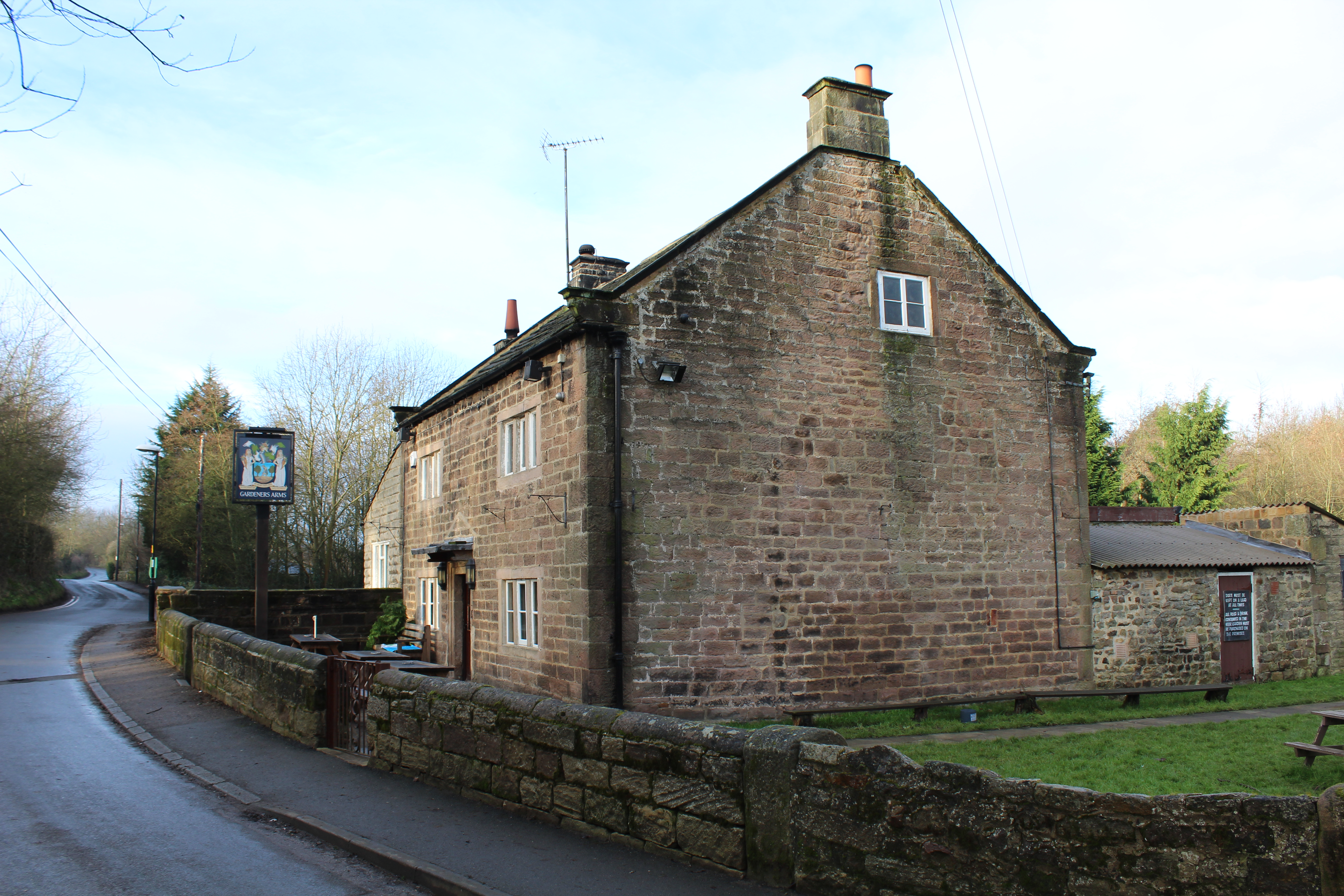
- Route 636 on Bilton Lane.
- Length: 4 miles (6.4 km)
- Designation: UK National Cycle Network
- Trailheads: West: Harrogate; East: Knaresborough
- Use: Cycling
- Waymark
- Website: sustrans.org.uk

National Cycle Network (NCN) Route 636 is a Sustrans Route that runs from Harrogate to Knaresborough. The route is 4 miles (6.4 km) in length and is fully open and signed in both directions.

== History ==
The first section of the route was opened in 1997 when it was dedicated to the memory of World Champion cyclist Beryl Burton OBE who had died the previous year. On becoming part of the National Cycle Network in 2013 it was extended along riverside paths through Knaresborough. The section at the eastern end, was resurfaced in 2016. Funded by County and Borough Councils with a contribution form local residents who own this private road.

== Route ==
Starting at Bilton on the northern side of Harrogate, the route follows Bilton Lane, a private road with limited access for residents and no through traffic. After the lane the Beryl Burton Cycleway continues along a tarmac path to Knaresborough. The route crosses the River Nidd on the A59 a then follows the waterside path around the edge of the town, finishing near the St James Retail Park.

At the eastern end the route meets the Nidderdale Greenway part of NCN Route 67. This traffic free section of the route can be used to reach central Harrogate or head north along the Greenway to Ripley.

== Related NCN routes ==
Route 636 meets the following routes:

- 67 at Harrogate
