= National Cycle Route 63 =

English bicycle route

National Cycle Route 63 (or NCR 63) is a route of the United Kingdom National Cycle Network, running from Burton on Trent to Wisbech.

== Route ==
Parts of the route are currently incomplete.

=== Burton on Trent to Measham ===
Burton on Trent | Swadlincote | Church Gresley | Moira | Donisthorpe | Measham

In Burton on Trent the route now starts and ends at the Trent & Mersey Canal in Shobnall at the start of the Kingfisher Trail and forms a junction with National Cycle Network Route 54. The section from Shobnall to the town centre was signed in June 2013.

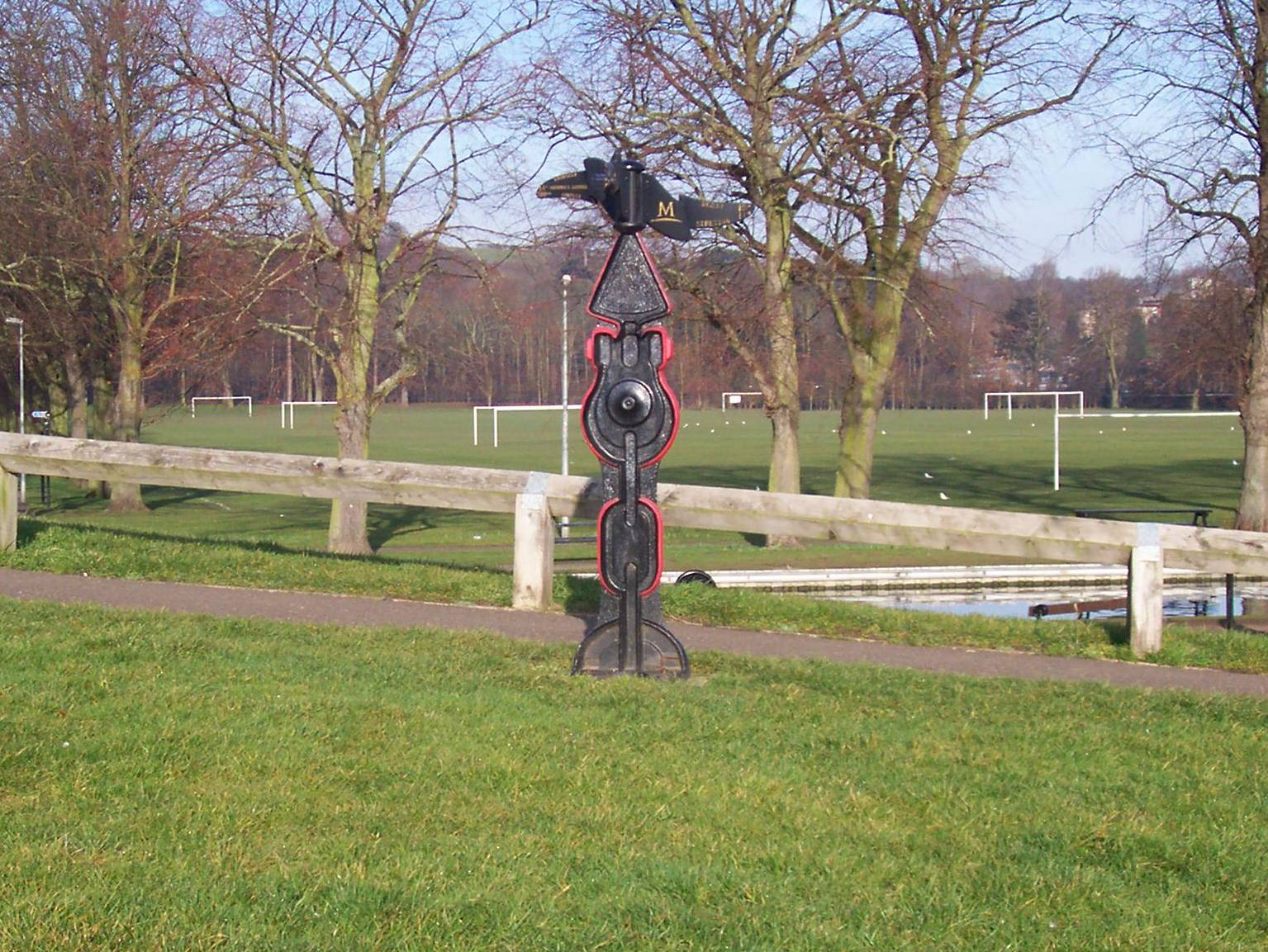
Sustrans milepost at intersection of NCN 54 & 63, Shobnall Feb 2012

The route has signed links to Burton Railway Station and runs close to the Brewery buildings which dominate the town. The route leaves Burton via Burton & South Derbyshire College over the Trent Washlands via the off-road Victorian Stapenhill Viaduct and Ferry Bridge (refurbished 2015-2016) prior to a climb up out of Burton via side streets onto the A444.

At the border with Derbyshire in Stanton, the route is currently incomplete but is planned to link through Newhall on an existing bridleway, then continue to Swadlincote via new off-road sections around a golf course which is currently under construction.

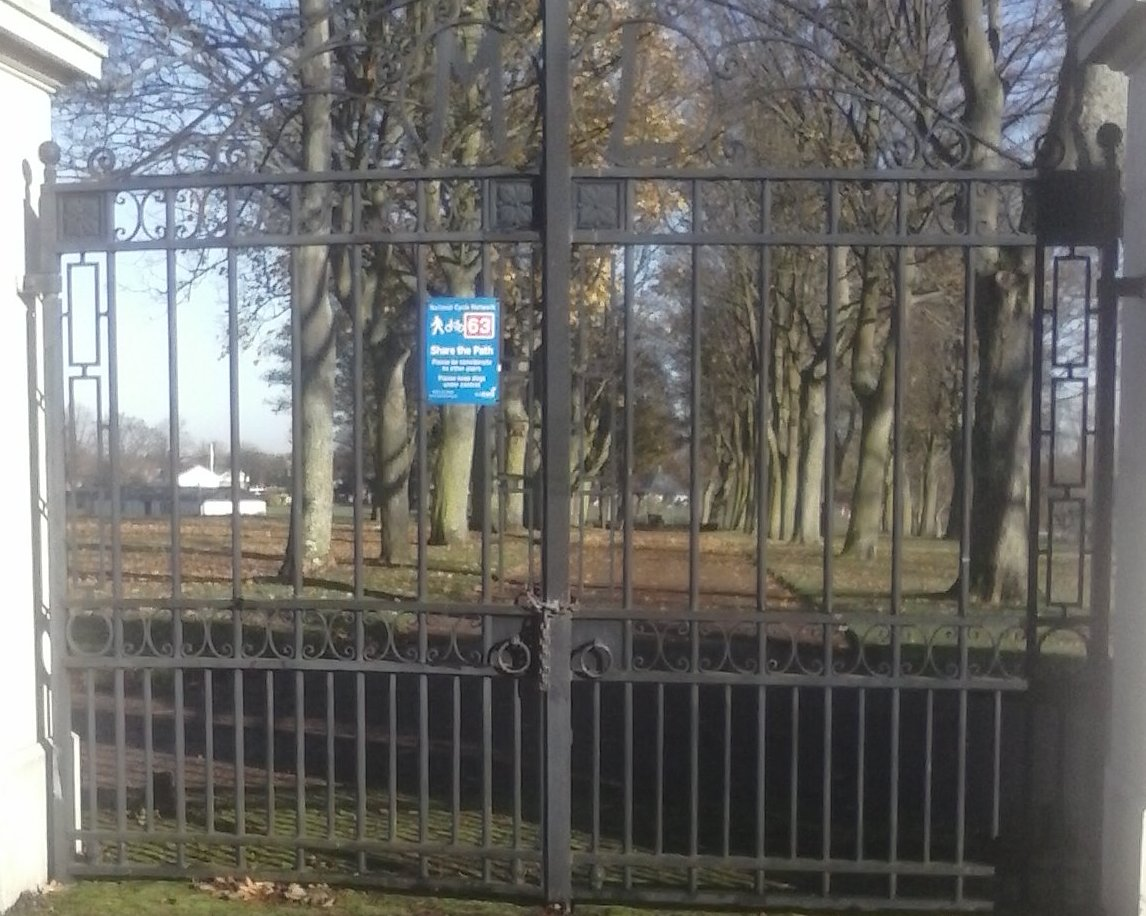
NCN 63 cuts through Maurice Lea Park in Church Gresley

The route passes through the heart of Swadlincote town centre where it is necessary to dismount, then climbs out of town via the Pipeworks retail park. The route continues into Church Gresley and cuts off-road through Maurice Lea Memorial Park. After a descent down Thorpe Downs Road, the route joins the Conkers Circuit and an off-road section leading through the heart of the National Forest for 6 miles to Measham.

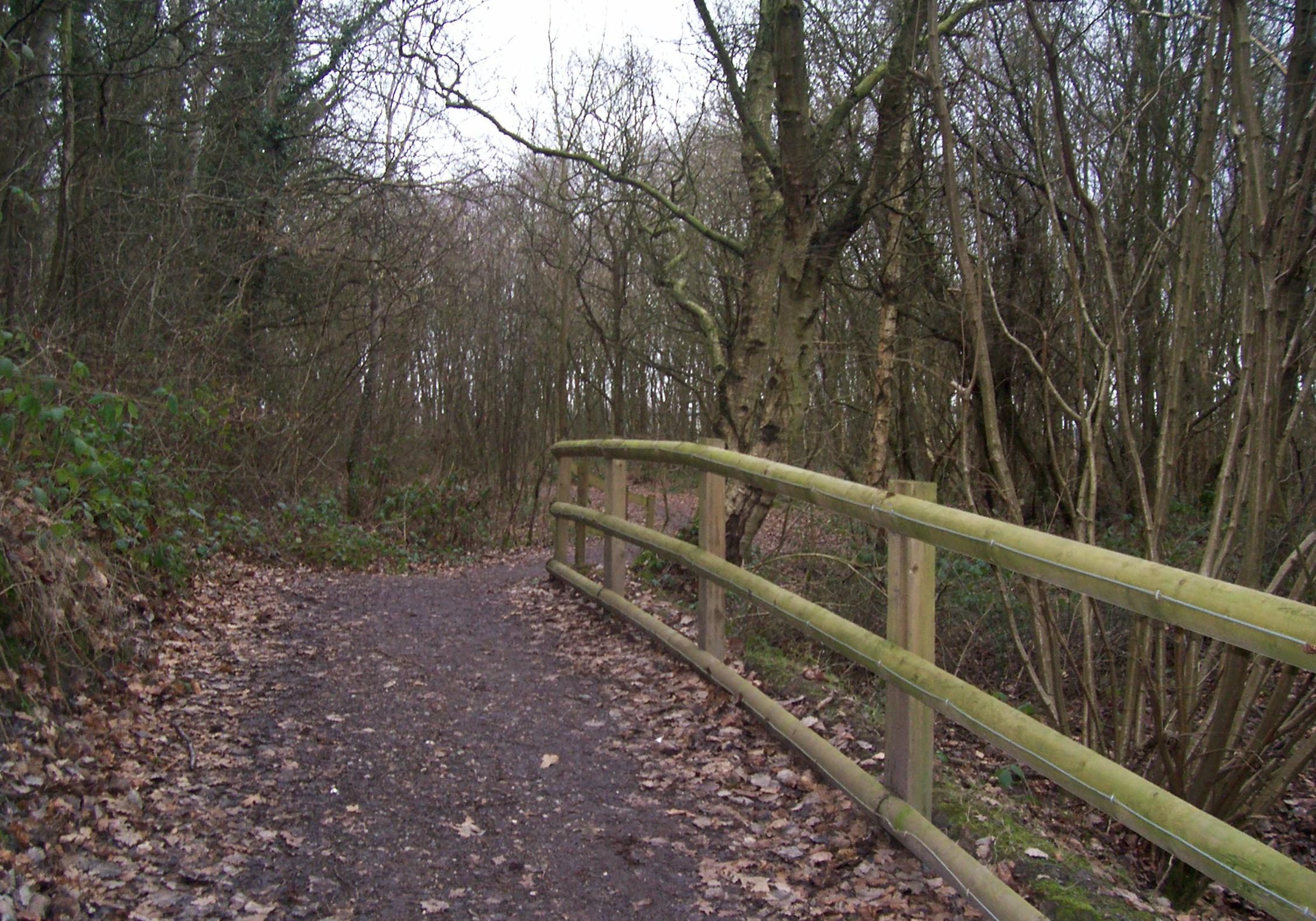
NCN 63 at Swainspark Wood near Church Gresley

Much of this section is built on the former Ashby and Nuneaton Joint Railway which also forms part of the Ashby Woulds Heritage Trail. Places the route passes through on this section are Spring Cottage, Moira and Donisthorpe. The path passes close to the Conkers Caravan and Camping site and also the National Forest Youth Hostel. At Donisthorpe there is a signed link to the National Forest Cycle Centre at Hicks Lodge, though an off-road route via Moira Furnace is currently under construction.

There is also an alternative section between Church Gresley and Donisthorpe signposted (63) which uses the Conkers Circuit anti-clockwise, via Albert Village, Conkers and the Ashby Canal via Moira Furnace. The 2 alternative routes make a 7-mile round circuit.

The route diverts briefly under the A42 on approach to Measham; after a further mile the off-road section ends at the Library and Leisure Centre. This section of the route could be set for major change in the future as there are plans to complete the Ashby Canal through Measham and surrounding area with the likelihood that route 63 will follow the new canal.

The recently announced route for HS2 rail link passes through Measham and if this goes ahead in its initial format and will bring a significant impact to the village.

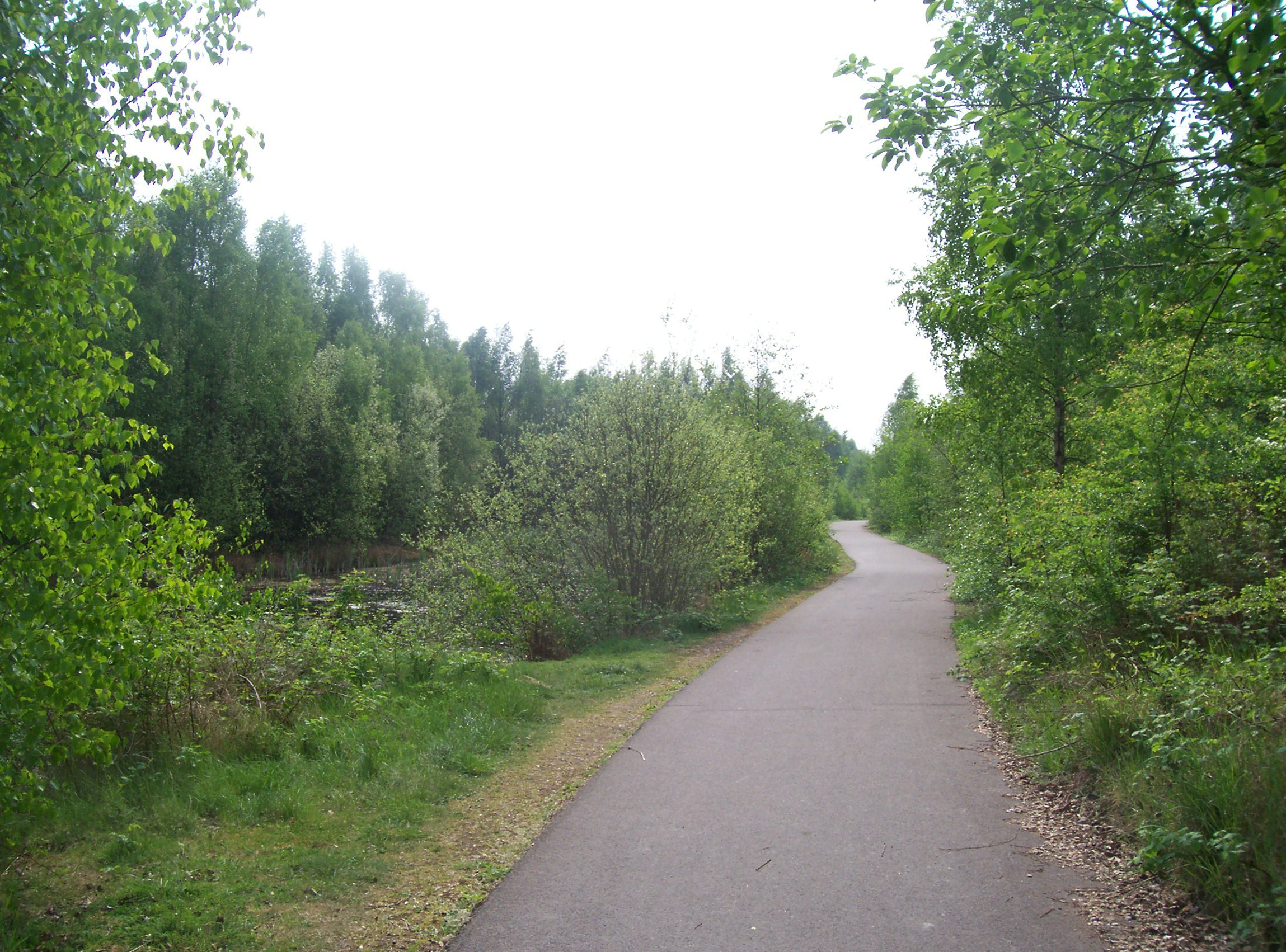
NCN 63 near Conkers

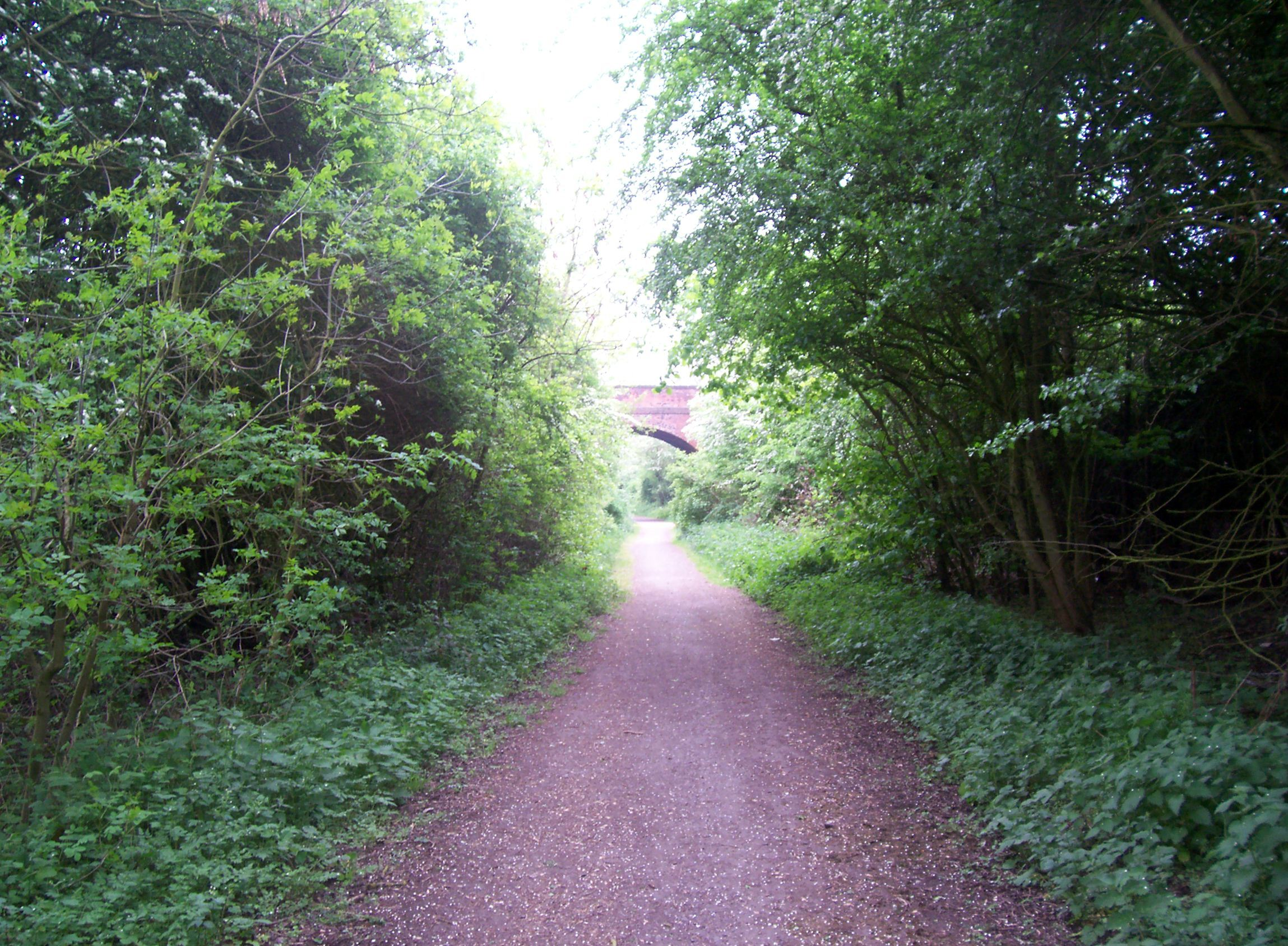
NCN 63 near Measham

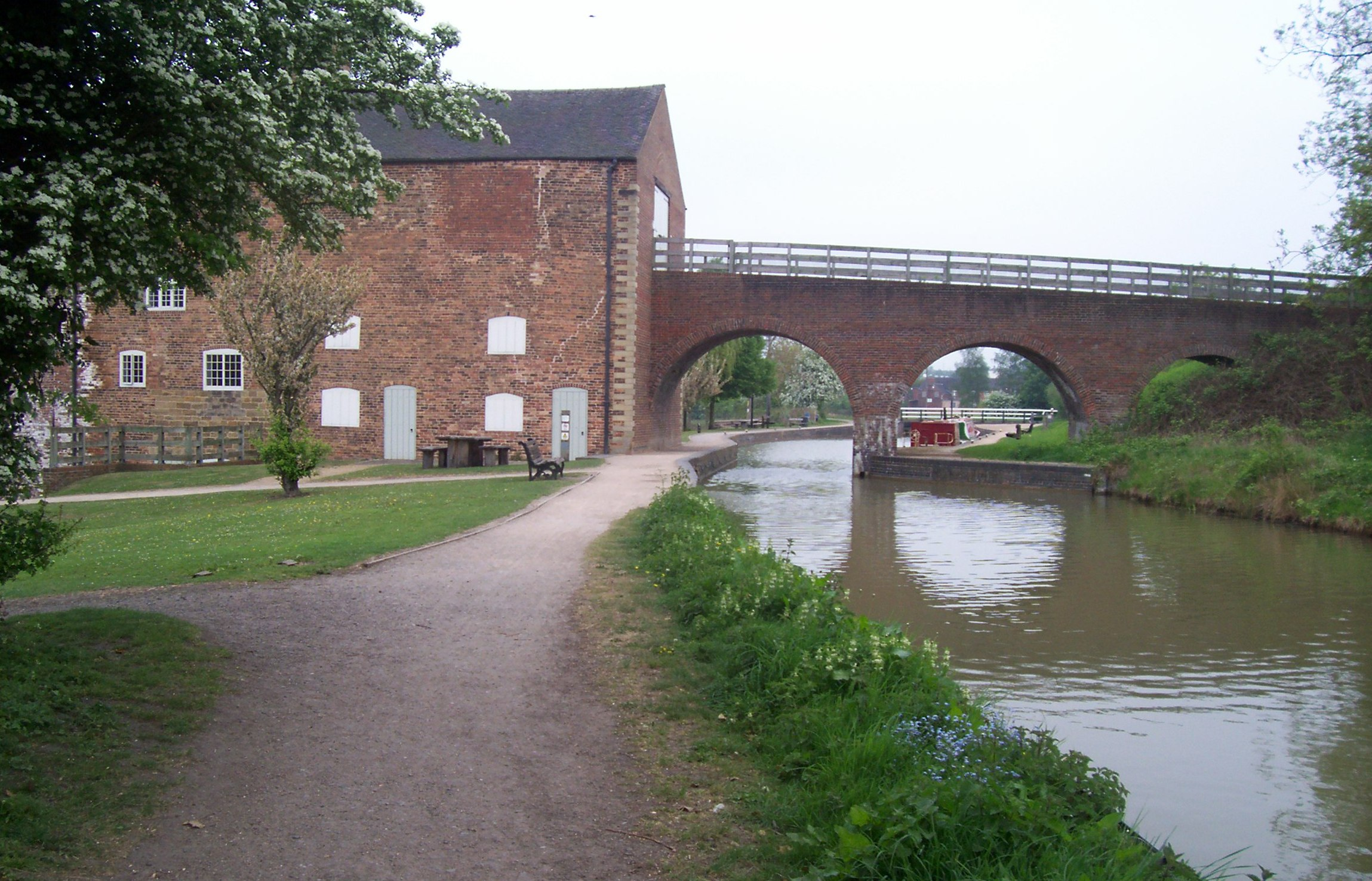
NCN (63)on Ashby Canal spur near Moira Furnace

=== Measham to Leicester ===
Measham | Ibstock | Thornton | Glenfield | Leicester

The route continues onto the traffic calmed High Street in Measham then turns onto Bosworth Road which leads out into the Leicestershire countryside. Whilst this is an on road section, it is typically quiet.

The first main point of interest is Newton Burgoland village. The route then crosses National Cycle Route 52 before reaching the hamlet of Odstone. At this point the route turns left, heading for Ibstock.

After crossing the A447 the route passes through a ford then turns onto the off-road section through Battram Wood for just over a mile before joining the road again through Bagworth & Thornton, passing directly past Thornton Reservoir. Shortly after the reservoir is a 2-mile section mainly off-road through woodlands before arriving in Ratby.

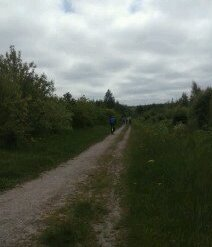
Off-road section through Battram Wood near Ibstock

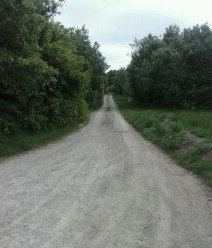
Final Battram Wood Stage in direction of Bagworth on NCN63

An off-road section then takes NCN63 over the M1 and A46 into the Glenfield area of Leicester.

=== Leicester to Oakham ===
Leicester | Goadby | Oakham

=== Oakham to Peterborough ===
Oakham | Rutland Water | Stamford | Peterborough

=== Peterborough to Wisbech ===
Peterborough | March, Cambridgeshire | Wisbech
