= National Cycle Route 18 =

Cycling route in Kent and East Sussex, England

Coordinates: 51.1027°N 0.7433°E

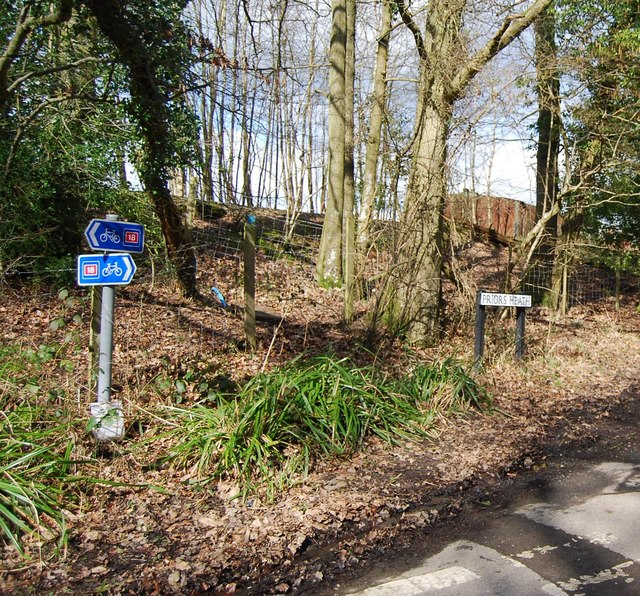
Waymark at the junction of Roger's Rough Rd and Priors Heath National

National Cycle Route 18 (NCR18) runs from Canterbury to Royal Tunbridge Wells. It follows the valley of the River Stour to Ashford and then runs through the High Weald via Tenterden.

== Route ==
=== Canterbury to Ashford ===
Canterbury | Chartham | Wye | Ashford

=== Ashford to Royal Tunbridge Wells ===
Ashford | Shadoxhurst | Tenterden | Bedgebury Forest | Pembury | Royal Tunbridge Wells

This section is mostly on roads, except for the section through Bedgebury Forest.
