= Harby, Nottinghamshire =

Village and civil parish in Nottinghamshire, England

Coordinates: 53.226°N 0.684°W

Harby
- Village and civil parish
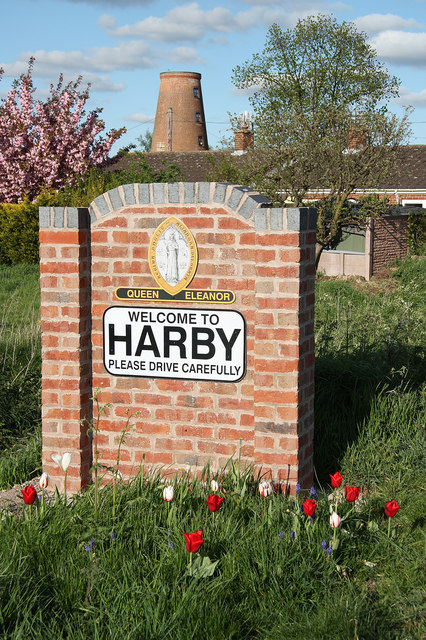
- Harby village sign

- Location within Nottinghamshire
- Interactive map of Harby
- Area: 1.86 sq mi (4.8 km^{2})
- Population: 346 (2021)
  - Density: 186/sq mi (72/km^{2})
- OS grid reference: SK 880707
  - London: 120 mi (190 km) SSE
- District: Newark and Sherwood
- Shire county: Nottinghamshire
- Region: East Midlands
- Country: England
- Sovereign state: United Kingdom
- Post town: NEWARK-ON-TRENT
- Postcode district: NG23
- Dialling code: 01522
- Police: Nottinghamshire
- Fire: Nottinghamshire
- Ambulance: East Midlands
- UK Parliament: Newark
- Website: www.harby-notts.org.uk

Harby is a village and civil parish in the Newark and Sherwood district of Nottinghamshire, England. It is close to Doddington, Lincolnshire, and is the easternmost settlement in Nottinghamshire, the boundary separating the two. According to the 2011 census, it had a population of 336, up from 289 at the 2001 census. It increased to 346 at the 2021 census.

== Heritage ==
=== Eleanor of Castile ===
The parish church of All Saints' was built in 1875–1876 in Early English style. In the east wall of the tower is a statue in memory of Eleanor of Castile, Queen Consort of King Edward I of England. She died at the nearby house of Richard de Weston on 28 November 1290. The moated site of Weston's house is to the west of the church. The Queen's body was transported to London for burial. The King ordered Eleanor crosses to be built at each place where her body had rested overnight on the journey.

=== Windmills ===
The capless stump of a five-storey tower windmill, built about 1877, stands at the end of Mill Field Close (grid reference SK877707). A post mill was also recorded for Harby.

=== Parish change ===
Harby was a township in the parish of North Clifton. It became a separate parish in 1866.

=== January 1957 air incident ===
On Wednesday 9 January 1957 a de Havilland Vampire Mk5 VZ860 crashed from RAF Worksop (Scofton). One house was completely flattened, which is now the site of Harby Village Hall. Three other homes were damaged. The pilot never ejected as he had blacked out: he was 25-year-old Scottish Pilot Officer Stanley Monro, of 25 Ormsby Lodge, The Avenue, Bedford Park, London. 64-year-old Mrs Lois Towning, who was with her daughter Mrs Dorothy Goldacre, was killed.

Two other women were severely injured in Lincoln County Hospital, Mrs Mary Olivant and Mrs L Richards. Fire engines attended from Collingham, Saxilby, Lincoln and Gainsborough, and ambulances from Lincoln, Scunthorpe and Gainsborough.

== Education and amenities ==
The village is served by Queen Eleanor Primary School. There is a term-time school bus from Harby to Tuxford Academy.

A pre-booking bus service No. 67 of about three services a day serves Newark, Collingham and Saxilby on Mondays to Saturdays. The nearest railway station is at Saxilby on the Doncaster–Lincoln line.

The village has a playing field with a bowls club and a children's play park. The village hall has two rooms for hire to groups, courses and circles. There is another room for hire at the local pub, the Bottle and Glass, which also serves food. Residents can rent allotments from the parish council. There are no permanent retail shopping facilities in the village.

== See also ==
- Listed buildings in Harby, Nottinghamshire
