= Lôn Cambria =

Cycle route in the United Kingdom

Lôn Cambria (Welsh for 'Cambrian Lane') is the section in Wales of National Cycle Route 81 in the British National Cycle Network, which runs from Aberystwyth to Wolverhampton.

Lôn Cambria is a 113-mile (182 km) cycle route that runs from Aberystwyth on the west coast of Wales to Shrewsbury in England. It crosses the Cambrian Mountains, passes the Elan Valley reservoirs, and continues through the rolling country of Mid Wales and Shropshire, climbing over the Long Mountain near Welshpool. It is often paired with Lôn Teifi which continues to Fishguard in southwest Wales.

The main route, National Cycle Route 81, is oriented mostly from southwest to northeast, except for a sizeable detour through the Elan Valley and the town of Rhayader. Route 818 makes a shortcut through a difficult mountain pass to bypass these.

== Route ==
Aberystwyth | Pont-rhyd-y-groes | Cwmystwyth

Including the Ystwyth Trail (a Rail trail).

Cambrian Mountains | Elan Valley | Rhayader | Llangurig

Including the Cwmystwyth Mines, Elan Valley Visitor Centre, Wind farms.

Llanidloes | Caersws | Newtown

Welshpool | Long Mountain | Shrewsbury
