= List of cycle routes in London =

This is a list of cycle routes in London that have been waymarked with formal route signage include 'Cycleways' and the older London Cycle Network, all designated by the local government body Transport for London (TfL), National Cycle Network routes designated by the sustainable transport charity Sustrans, and miscellaneous 'Greenways' created by various bodies. Most recently, in May 2020 TfL announced its 'Streetspace for London' in response to the COVID-19 pandemic. Not all these routes are dedicated 'traffic free' cycle tracks: most of them also include ordinary roads shared with motor traffic and footpaths shared with pedestrians.

== Cycleways ==
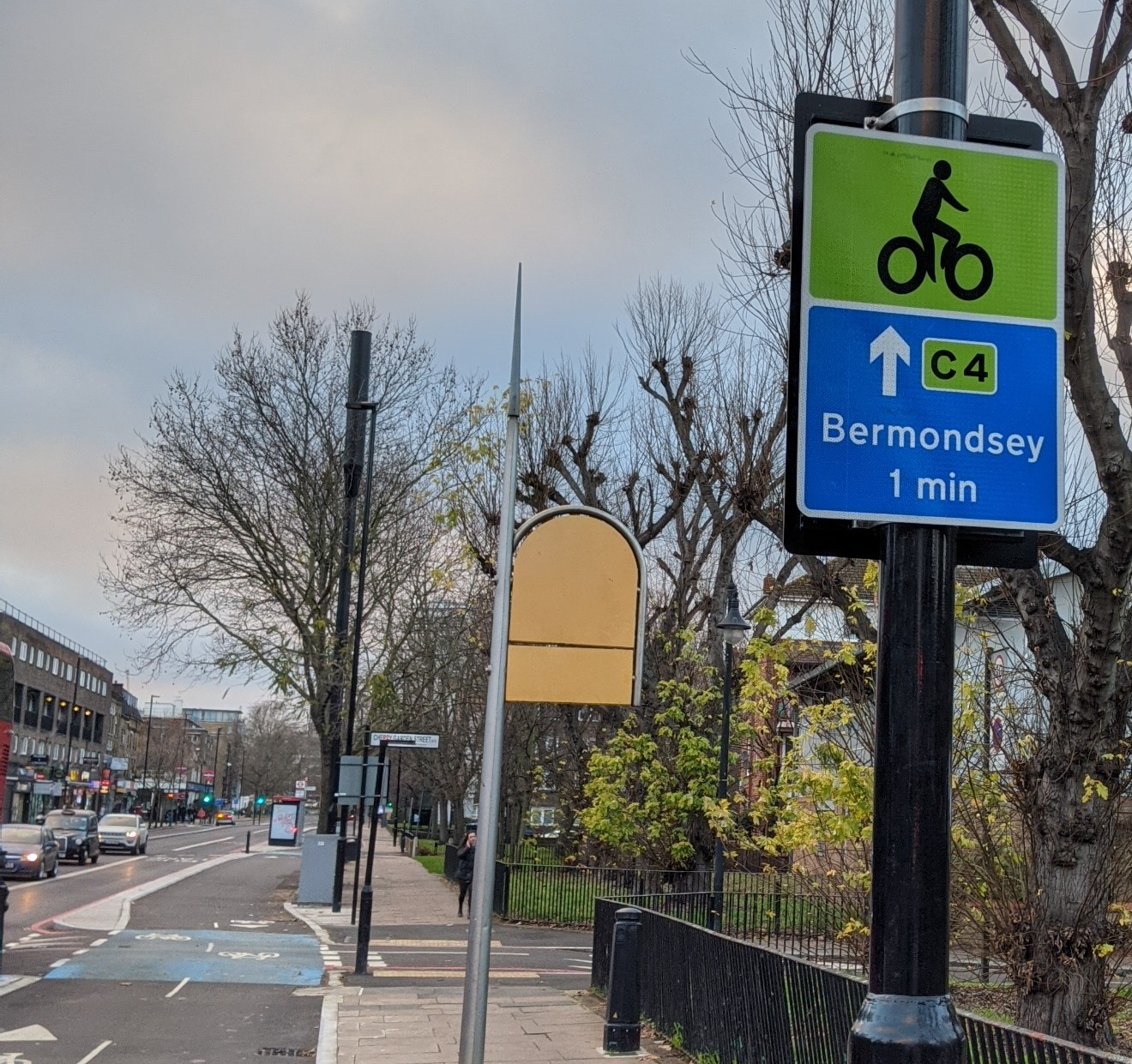
Cycleway 4 on A200 Jamaica Road

From summer 2019, TfL started branding new cycle routes (and re-branding and consolidating some existing routes) as 'Cycleways'. This was following feedback and criticism that the previous branding ('Superhighways' and 'Quietways') was sometimes "misleading".

All new and existing routes must meet new, stricter 'Cycling Quality Criteria' in order for TfL to sign them as Cycleways.

The Central London Cycle Grid is a partially completed scheme within central London which includes both numbered and unnumbered Cycleways, Cycle Superhighways and Quietways.

List of currently open Cycleway routes:
Name	Route	Boroughs	Comments	Approximate Length	Map
C1	Freezy Water – Ponders End – Lower Edmonton – Upper Edmonton – North Middlesex Hospital – Tottenham – Seven Sisters – Stamford Hill – Stoke Newington – Dalston – De Beauvoir – Hoxton – Shoreditch – The City (A10)	Enfield, Haringey, Hackney, Islington	CS1 route between Tottenham and the city was completed in April 2016. Now rebranded as C1.	21 km	map
C2	City – Whitechapel – Mile End – Bow – Stratford (A11 – A118)	Tower Hamlets, Newham	As an upgrade to the old LCN 11 route, Cycle Superhighway 2 initially consisted mostly of 'blue paint' cycle lanes. In 2016, after safety concerns and fatalities, the majority of the route was further upgraded to separated cycle tracks . In September 2021, the whole section was signposted as C2. Infrastructure is being installed in phases along Romford Road for a future extension of the route to Ilford.	7.6 km	map
C3	Lancaster Gate – Hyde Park – Westminster – Embankment – Blackfriars – Tower Hill – Shadwell – Limehouse – Poplar – Canning Town – North Beckton – Barking (A4209 – A402 – Hyde Park – A3211 – A1202 – A13)	Westminster, City of London, Tower Hamlets, Newham, Barking and Dagenham	Main article: Cycleway 3 CS3 was rebranded as C3 during January and February 2023. The initial section of CS3 from Barking to Tower Hill was largely an upgrade to the old LCN 13 route. Sustrans has also designated much of this stretch as being part of their NCN 13 . In 2017, TfL constructed a lengthy extension of CS3 to Lancaster Gate.	14.3 miles (23 km)	map
C4	London Bridge – Bermondsey – Surrey Quays – Deptford – Greenwich – Charlton – (Woolwich)	Southwark, Lewisham, Greenwich	Main article: Cycleway 4 Originally announced as Cycle Superhighway 4, Cycleway 4 is open from Tower Bridge Road to Greenwich, although only the Bermondsey section is signed. As of May 2021, a temporary extension of the route to Monument station and a further temporary alignment of the route between Greenwich and Charlton (signed only as C ) were both open, funded by the Streetspace for London programme. The Surrey Quays section of the route is an interim alignment. Eventually C4 is proposed to run from London Bridge to Plumstead via Woolwich.	8.3 km	map1 map2
C5	C14 – Waterloo – Vauxhall – Stockwell – Clapham Common	Lambeth, Wandsworth	Initially planned to link Waterloo to Croydon, but only the section from C14 (on Union Street) to Clapham Common has been launched. Initially named Q5, it also incorporates what was the southern most section of London's shortest Cycle Superhighway, the CS5. It was rebranded as Cycleway 5 in December 2021.	6.8 km	map
C6	Belsize Park – Kentish Town West – (→Kentish Town} – {→Camden Town} – St Pancras International – {→King's Cross } – Farringdon – Ludgate Circus – Blackfriars Bridge – Southwark – St. George's Circus – Elephant & Castle	Camden, Islington, Southwark	Includes all of the former 'North–South Cycle Superhighway' (CS6), plus a further northward extension to Belsize Park.	10 km	map
CS7	City – Southwark Bridge – Elephant & Castle – Kennington – Oval – Stockwell – Clapham North – Clapham High Street – Clapham Common – Clapham South – Balham – Tooting Bec – Tooting Broadway – Colliers Wood (A3 – A24)	City of London, Southwark, Lambeth, Wandsworth	This route continues to be referred to as a Cycle Superhighway route by TfL. It featured few separated lanes, but during 2020, as part of the response to COVID-19, several sections were upgraded to segregated lanes, including the use of 'floating bus stops'.	13 km	map
C7	Wandsworth Common – Clapham Common	Wandsworth	Route has C7 road markings, but initial signs along the route are for an unnumbered "C" route.	1.1 km	map
C8 / CS8	Wandsworth High Street – Wandsworth Town – Battersea High Street – Battersea Park – Chelsea Bridge – Vauxhall Bridge – Lambeth Bridge	Wandsworth, Westminster	During 2020, the stretch of CS8 between Vauxhall Bridge and Chelsea Bridge (along Grosvenor Road and Millbank) was largely segregated from the carriageway with 'wands'; in early 2021 this stretch was re-signed as C8.	7.5 km	CS8 map C8 map
C9	(Syon Park) – Brentford – Kew Bridge – Chiswick – (Hammersmith)	Hounslow, (Hammersmith and Fulham)	Partly launched in Hounslow, extending eastwards from Brentford as far as Hammersmith and Fulham (where the route is yet to be signed, as it is yet to be upgraded from its current temporary infrastructure.)	5.1 km	map
C10	Euston – Covent Garden – Strand (– Waterloo Bridge –) Waterloo – Borough – Bermondsey Spa – South Bermondsey – Deptford – Greenwich	Camden, Westminster, Southwark, Lewisham, Greenwich	Formerly Q1. The portion in Bermondsey/Southwark also forms part of NCN 425 (and includes stretches that were formerly LCN 2). Missing section of the route across Waterloo Bridge: Streetspace for London plans included possible road restriction to only cyclists and buses on the bridge.	11 km	map
C11	Angel – Hoxton – Old Street – Barbican ( C6 )	Islington, Hackney, City of London	Includes a large section of the former Q11 route. Runs from Islington's Essex Road to Farringdon Road via Barbican and provides a connection between C27 , C13 and C6 . It also connects to CS7 and C3 via a C link that previously was part of Q11.	3.3 km	map
Q3 (future C12 )	Gladstone Park (Dollis Hill) – Kilburn	Brent	The delivered Q3 route in Brent is to get some improved crossings before being rebranded as C12 . Q3 was originally planned to link Gladstone Park with Regent's Park, but Camden and Westminster boroughs have not yet implemented their sections of the route.	3.6 km	map
C13	Old Street – Shoreditch – {→Bethnal Green} – {→Haggerston} – Broadway Market – London Fields – Hackney	Islington, Tower Hamlets, Hackney	Previously was Q13. Connects C11 to C27 .	3.7 km	map
C14 / Q14	(Waterloo) – London Bridge – Rotherhithe – {→Canada Water} – (Deptford) ... Greenwich – Greenwich Peninsula – Charlton Riverside – Woolwich – Thamesmead – Erith	Southwark, (Lewisham,) Greenwich	Originally planned and partially signposted as Q14, C14 is waymarked from Blackfriars Road (where it meets C6 ) as far as Greenland Lock near the Lewisham border, much of which is shared with NCN 4 . The signed route also runs from Greenwich Town Centre to beyond Thamesmead, mostly running along the NCN 1 Thames Path. Although a route continues further towards Erith, there are just older Q14 signs along a section of it.	17 km	map
C15 / Q15	West Brompton – South Kensington – Chelsea	Kensington & Chelsea, (Westminster)	Western end of Q15 was rebranded as C15 in 2025, with an addition extension of the route through Brompton Cemetery. A proposed extension to Belgravia has yet to be implemented by Westminster council.	4.6 km	C15 map Q15 map
C16	(Hackney Wick –) Queen Elizabeth Olympic Park – {→Stratford} – Forest Gate – Manor Park – Aldersbrook – Valentines Park – Barkingside	(Tower Hamlets, Hackney,) Newham, Redbridge	Valentines Park is closed at night. Formerly signed as Q6, which was planned to extend from Mile End to Barkingside, but Tower Hamlets council's originally proposed section was not approved by TfL.	11 km	map
C17	Borough – Walworth – Burgess Park (– →Denmark Hill) ... Dulwich Village ... Southwark border – South Circular Road	Southwark, Lambeth	Northern section of what was formerly known as Q7. There have been proposals to extend the route further south as far as Crystal Palace.	3.7 km	map
C18	C4 – Deptford Bridge – Ladywell – Catford – Lower Sydenham – New Beckenham – Kent House	Lewisham, Bromley		9.1 km	map
C20	{→Cheshunt} – Broxbourne border – {→Waltham Cross} – Bullsmoor Lane – Enfield Town ... Enfield Town – Winchmore Hill – Palmers Green – {→Wood Green} ... {→Dalston} – Canonbury – {→Shoreditch}	Enfield, (Haringey,) Islington, (Hackney)	The existing route loosely follows New River within the borough of Enfield. There is a gap in the route in Enfield Town centre. Southern end of the northern section of the route currently ends at the Enfield-Haringey border. There are separate sections of C20 in Islington.	13 km	map
C21	Bush Hill – Edmonton Green – Meridian Water	Enfield	The existing route loosely follows Salmons Brook within the borough of Enfield, connecting C20 at Bush Hill Parade to Meridian Water train station.	4.8 km	map
C22	Stratford High Street ( C2 ) – ... West Ham – Plaistow – East Ham – North Beckton ( C3 )	Newham	An upgrade to the section of LCN 16 along The Greenway connecting C2 and C3 . Formerly known as Q22, this route is planned to be extended to Victoria Park. Due to (long term) sewer works, the Greenway route is closed around West Ham Station, between Channelsea Bridge and Upper Road.	3.8 km	map
C23	{→Clissold Park} – Dalston – Hackney Downs – Lea Bridge Roundabout – {→Hackney} – Lea Bridge – {→Leyton} – {→Walthamstow} – Bakers Arms – {→Walthamstow Village} – South Woodford	Islington, Hackney, Waltham Forest	This upgraded an 8 km section of the old LCN route along Lea Bridge Road. Eastwards the route currently ends to the south of Waterworks Roundabout. A westwards extension to Dalston opened in 2025.	14 km	map
C24	Tottenham Hale – Walthamstow Wetlands – Blackhorse Road – Bell Junction – Waterworks Roundabout	Haringey, Waltham Forest	Signed as C24 in Waltham Forest. An eastward extension towards the Redbridge border is under construction.	5.4 km	map
C25	Westfield Stratford City – Hackney Marshes – Queen Elizabeth Olympic Park – Leyton – Leytonstone – Wanstead	Newham, Hackney, Waltham Forest	C25 launched in Waltham Forest in July 2024. An extension via Hackney Marshes towards Stratford Westfield is partly signed.	5.5 km	map
C26	Blackhorse Road – Argall – {→Leyton } – Queen Elizabeth Olympic Park – →Stratford	Waltham Forest, Newham	Connects C24 to C16	7.6 km	map
C27	East Acton – Wormwood Scrubs – North Kensington – {→Notting Hill} – Paddington – Marylebone – Fitzrovia – Bloomsbury – {→Clerkenwell} – Angel – Canonbury – De Beauvoir Town – London Fields – Clapton – Lea Bridge – Argall – Walthamstow Central	Hammersmith & Fulham, Kensington & Chelsea, Westminster, Camden, Islington, Hackney, Waltham Forest	A long east-west route formerly known as Quietway 2. The Waltham Forest section of the route now shares a section of C23 and goes via Argall (instead of following the former Q2 alignment that passed outside the south entrance to Walthamstow Wetlands.)	27 km	map
C28	Kingston – {→Surbiton} – Dittons	Kingston upon Thames	An upgrade to part of the old LCN 3 route; initially waymarked as Quietway Q19 before being rebranded as Cycleway 28 in December 2019. Has a C-link to Kingston University and there is also a signed connection towards Surbiton (crossing over to Palace Road to get to C29 ).	1.1 miles (1.8 km)	map
C29	Kingston – {→Surbiton} ... Tolworth	Kingston upon Thames	A continuous extension to a separate section of the route in Tolworth is under construction.	1.6 km	map
C30	Kingston Town Centre – Kingston Hospital – Kingston Vale	Kingston upon Thames	Route is open, although there are short sections where the proposed mini-holland cycling infrastructure has not yet been delivered.	5 km	map
C31	New Malden – Raynes Park	Kingston upon Thames, Merton	First section between New Malden and Raynes Park opened on 13 July 2019. There have been proposals to extend this to Wimbledon.	1.6 miles (2.7 km)	map
C32	(Kingston Town Centre) – New Malden	Kingston upon Thames	Partly signed at the New Malden end of the route		map
C33	Queen Elizabeth Hospital – Woolwich Town Centre	Greenwich, Lewisham	Will be a link off a future 'Woolwich to Lee Green' Cycleway route. Was previously signed as an unnumbered 'Q' route	2.1 km	map
C34	North Acton – East Acton – White City ... Hammersmith - Fulham	Ealing, Hammersmith & Fulham	Construction started in March 2019. First section opened in May 2020. This initial section was formerly planned to be Cycleway 10.	7 km	map
C35	Bermondsey Spa – Peckham (– Peckham Rye – Brockley)	Southwark	Opened in summer 2020. Connects directly to C10 at Bermondsey Spa and mostly follows the routes of the old LCN 22 and part of NCN 425 .	1.3 miles (2.1 km)	map
C36	Kennington Park – Burgess Park – C35	Southwark	Only signed at one modal filter (beside Chandler Way)!		map
C37	C27 – Victoria Park – Mile End – Westferry (– Island Gardens)	Hackney, Tower Hamlets	Next section of the route is planned to be between Mile End and Westferry.	1.3 km	map
C38	Finsbury Park – {→Highbury & Islington } – Angel (– Pentonville)	Hackney, Islington	Formerly planned as the Q10 route.	4 km	map
C39	Shepherd's Bush – Kensington Olympia	Kensington & Chelsea	Opened in spring 2020.	1.1 km	map
C40	Greenford Broadway – Ealing Broadway ... Ealing – {→South Ealing} – Brentford ... Syon Park – Twickenham	Ealing, Hounslow, Richmond upon Thames	Current route is not continuous. First section opened in Hounslow in 2021. More sections opened in Ealing in 2024. The route has since been extended to Twickenham.	13 km	map
C41	Euston – Holborn	Camden	Shares much of the route with C6	2.5 km	map
C42	Ilford – Barking Town Centre – Barking Riverside	Redbridge, Barking and Dagenham	Mostly completed route with a notable gap on Wakering Road, just north of Barking station.	6.6 km	map
C43	Hyde Park – Edgware Road (– Marylebone – Fitzrovia)	Westminster	Initial section opened in April 2026, with signed links that connect to C27 at Norfolk Crescent.	0.5 km	map
C44	(Queen's Park) – Grand Union Canal – North Kensington – Notting Hill	Kensington & Chelsea, Westminster	Opened in August 2020. Follows the old LCN 45 route for almost all of its length.	1.5 miles (2.4 km)	map
C48	(Clapham Old Town) – Brixton – Herne Hill– {→Streatham} – Valley Road	Lambeth	Opened in December 2022, although safe crossings of Brixton Road and Christchurch Road have yet to be delivered by Transport for London. There ia also a gap in the signed route at Brockwell Park.	6.2 km	map
C49	East Acton – Chiswick	Hammersmith and Fulham, Ealing, Hounslow	Launched in March 2023. At its southern end, a safe crossing to C9 is yet to be installed.	4.5 km	map
C50	Camden Town – Holloway – Finsbury Park (– Tottenham Hale)	Camden, Islington, (Haringey)	C50 begins at C6 near Camden Road station and ends approaching (but not actually reaching) Finsbury Park station.	5.2 km	map
C51	Burnt Oak – Colindale (– Kilburn – Marylebone)	Barnet, (Camden, Westminster)	First section opened in Barnet in March 2024. The Westminster section of the route is under construction (as of 2025), with one 'parallel crossing' already signed.	1.5 km	map
C52 / Q1	Euston – Bloomsbury – Covent Garden	Camden, Westminster	Passes by the British Museum. A short section is yet to be fully rebranded from Q1 to C52.	1.6 km	map
C53	Enfield Town – Ponders End	Enfield	Partly built and signed as an unnumbered "C" route.		
C54	Canning Town – {→Royal Docks} – West Silvertown – Pontoon Dock – Royal Albert Dock	Newham	Launched as C54 in January 2026. Has signed links to Royal Docks ( C ) and to London City Airport.	3.5 km	map
C55	Lancaster Gate – Marble Arch – Hyde Park Corner	Westminster	The section on Park Lane was introduced as one of the first Streetspace for London schemes, and subsequently was upgraded with permanent infrastructure.	2 km	map
C56	Westminster Bridge – {→Waterloo} – C5	Lambeth	Opened in 2022.	1.3 km	map
C57	Hammersmith – Hammersmith Bridge – Barnes	Hammersmith & Fulham, Richmond upon Thames	Northern end of the route is shared with C34	2.1 km	map
C58	Southgate – Palmers Green (– Meridian Water)	Enfield	Launched in 2023.	1.8 km	map
C59	New Southgate – Edmonton	Enfield	Partly built but unsigned, apart from being included on C58 signs at one junction. The section from New Southgate to Palmers Green is under consultation.		
C60	North Chingford – Chingford Mount – Walthamstow	Waltham Forest	Launched in 2024.	6.3 km	map
C61	North Chingford – Highams Park – Walthamstow	Waltham Forest	Launched in 2024.	6.4 km	map
C62	(Westminster – ) C5 – Kennington Park (– Peckham – Brimmington Park – Surrey Quays – Rotherhithe)	Lambeth, (Southwark)	Initial section connects C5 to Kennington Park. Construction began in 2025 on a separate section between Peckham and Surrey Quay.	1.3 km	map
C63	Fitzrovia (– Pimlico)	(Camden, Westminster)	Construction of the northern end of the route started in late 2025.		
C64	(Greenwich Park – Elverson Road)	(Greenwich, Lewisham)	Lewisham have installed a single sign for the route along C18, directing northbound cyclists towards Greenwich via the ramp at Elverson Road DLR station.		
C65	Kentish Town – King's Cross	Camden			
C66	{→Brockley } – Brockley – Forest Hill	Lewisham	Launched in 2025.	3.5 km	map
C67	Pinner – Harrow	Harrow	Under construction.		
C68	Morden – Sutton	Sutton			
C69	Chalk Farm – King's Cross	Camden			
C72	Wembley – Stonebridge – Harlesden (– Willesden Junction)	Brent	The initial section of this future route will be between Wembley and Harlesden.		
	West Drayton – Stockley Park – North Circular Road – Old Oak Lane – Regent's Canal	Canal & River Trust	Unsigned route that was previously planned to be Q16. Majority of route is along the upgraded Grand Union Canal towpath.		map
Link routes ( C )	Central London Grid (various)	Camden, City of London, Lambeth, Kensington & Chelsea	Cycleway link routes are usually way-marked with an un-numbered C : Route linking C11 to CS7 and C3 (map); Route linking C11 to Liverpool Street (map); Route linking C2 (Aldgate) to C3 (Tower Gateway) (map); Cycleway linking C6 to King's Cross (map); Cycleway linking C6 and C3 (map); Links off C62 in Vauxhall (map1, (map2); Link off C27 to Hyde Park		
Link routes ( C )	Greenwich – Charlton	Greenwich	A pop-up Streetspace route as an intermediate version of Cycleway 4. This route is signed as C .		map1 map2
Link routes ( C )	Stratford – Forest Gate – Manor Park	Newham	Largely runs parallel to a future extension of Cycleway 2 along Romford Road.	4.2 km	map
Link routes ( C )	Surbiton	Kingston upon Thames	A link between C29 and Surbiton, running along St. Mark's Hill.		map
Link routes ( Q )	Central London Grid (various)	Lambeth, Kensington & Chelsea, Westminster, City of London, Islington, Hackney	Routes are way-marked with an un-numbered Q. Notable link routes include: Link off C3 to Westminster looping around St James's Park via The Mall (map); Quietways leading off C3 through Hyde Park (map, map); Links leading off C3 through Kensington Gardens (map, map); Links leading off Q15 in Kensington (map, map)		

=== Cycle Superhighways ===
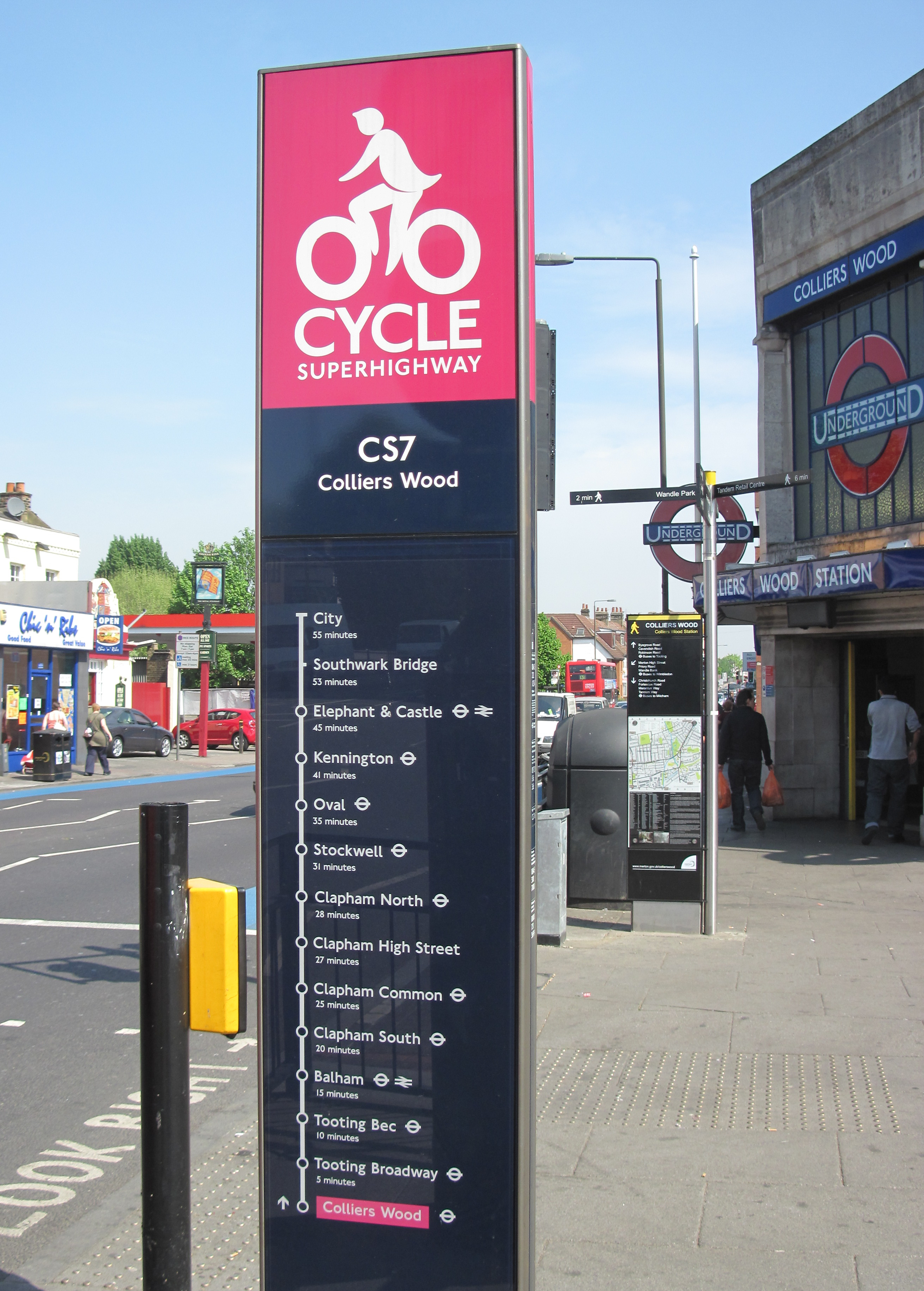
CS7 at Colliers Wood Station, showing a 'totem' route sign.

London's Cycle Superhighways were a set of Bike freeways, that were aimed principally at commuters and more experienced cyclists, providing faster and more direct radial routes between outer and central London. In addition to route signage with a pink logo, other distinctive features included blue cycle lanes on some of the routes (the brand colour of the scheme's original sponsor, Barclays) and 'totem' style signage pillars.

==== History ====
London's Cycle Superhighways were first announced in 2008 by Mayor Ken Livingstone. The original proposal consisted of 12 radial routes, with routes numbered in 'clock face' fashion. Initial implementation of the cycle superhighways also drew criticism on safety grounds, with poor design at some junctions, insufficient segregation of cyclists from motor traffic and slippery surfaces all contributing to numerous fatalities. Several of the superhighways were never built due to opposition from the respective London boroughs.

In 2018 TfL dropped the 'cycle superhighway' name from use on any further projects. All the existing Cycle Superhighways are now part of the Cycleways network and will be rebranded as a numbered 'Cycleway'. Only CS7 and some of CS8 have yet to be rebranded.

=== Quietways ===
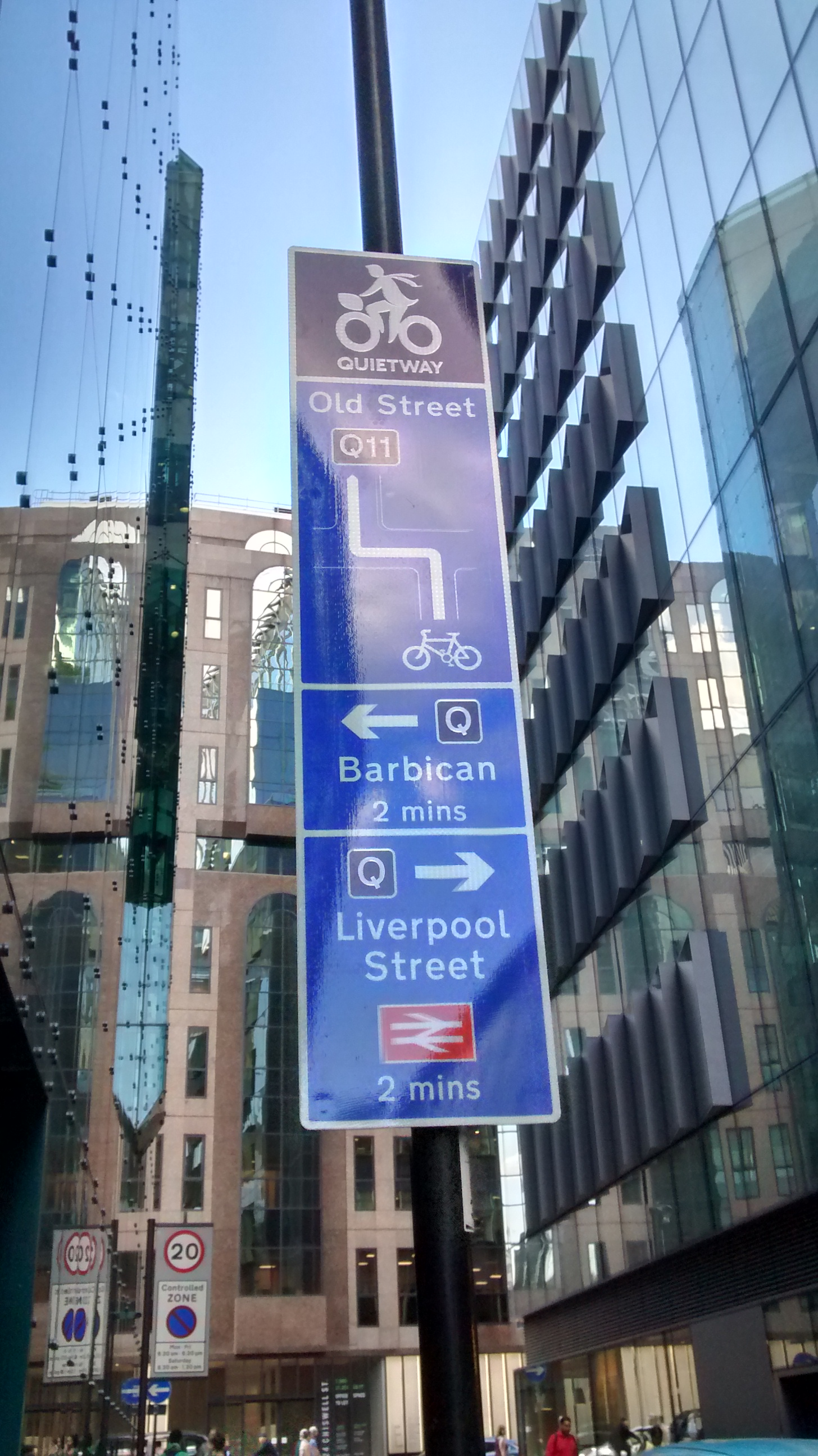
Signage (now removed) for three former Quietway cycle routes on Moor Lane in the City.

First announced in 2015, TfL's Quietways targeted less confident cyclists who want to use routes with less traffic, whilst also providing for existing cyclists who want to travel at a more gentle pace. The route numbers were shown in purple on signs.

The scheme lasted only three years before TfL decided to drop the Quietways brand, using 'Cycleways' for further new routes. All Quietways are now formally part of the Cycleways network and the delivered Quietways are being gradually rebranded as 'Cycleways' (and renumbered in most cases).

== Streetspace for London ==
In May 2020, in response to the COVID-19 pandemic and the resulting need to maintain social distancing, TfL announced a programme of measures that includes additional cycling provision. Some of these measures are described as 'temporary', although others appear to include fast-tracking of permanent cycle routes. TfL implemented routes delivered under this programme have so far included:

List of notable Streetspace routes implemented by TfL
Name	Route	Boroughs	Comments	Map
C	Hampstead Road	Camden	With flow lightly segregated cycle lanes from Euston Road to Mornington Crescent can be intermittent. Approximately 1.1 km long.	map
	Bishopsgate	City of London	5 Bus Gates have been installed to create a bus and cycle only street from Shoreditch High Street to Monument Junction, 0700-1900 Monday to Friday.	map
	London Bridge	City of London	Closure to private motor traffic from 0700 to 1900 Monday to Friday, plus creation of with-flow semi-segregated lanes.	map
CS7	Clapham South - Balham - Tooting Bec - Tooting Broadway - Colliers Wood	Wandsworth, Merton	Upgrade of existing with flow cycle lanes to be mostly light segregated lanes, plus the creation of bus stop bypasses, on the section from Alderbrook Road to Colliers Wood.	overview map 1 overview map 2 overview map 3
C8	Lambeth Bridge - Vauxhall Bridge - Chelsea Bridge	Westminster	Upgrade of existing with flow cycle lanes to be mostly light segregated lanes, plus the creation of bus stop bypasses along Millbank from Lambeth Bridge to Chelsea Bridge.	

Additionally, numerous pop up cycle routes have been funded by TfL or the Department for Transport as part of Streetspace, but implemented by boroughs. Funding has also been provided for Low Traffic Neighbourhoods, which have filtered roads to prevent through traffic through residential areas, having a knock on effect on cycling by improving links through these areas. As of January 2021, TfL's website listed over 30 different Streetspace schemes. Sustrans published a map of streetspace interventions.

== London Cycle Network Plus ==
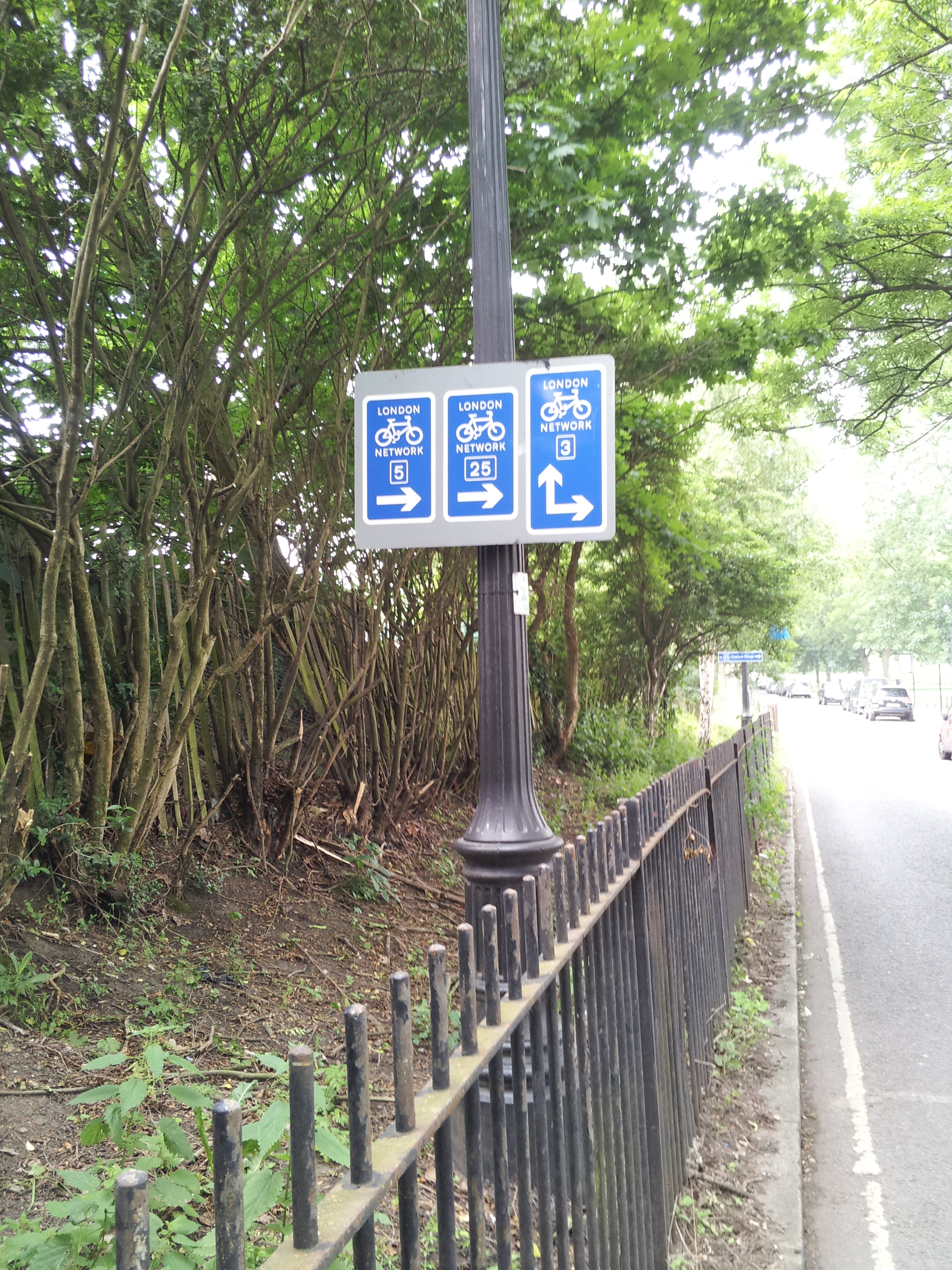
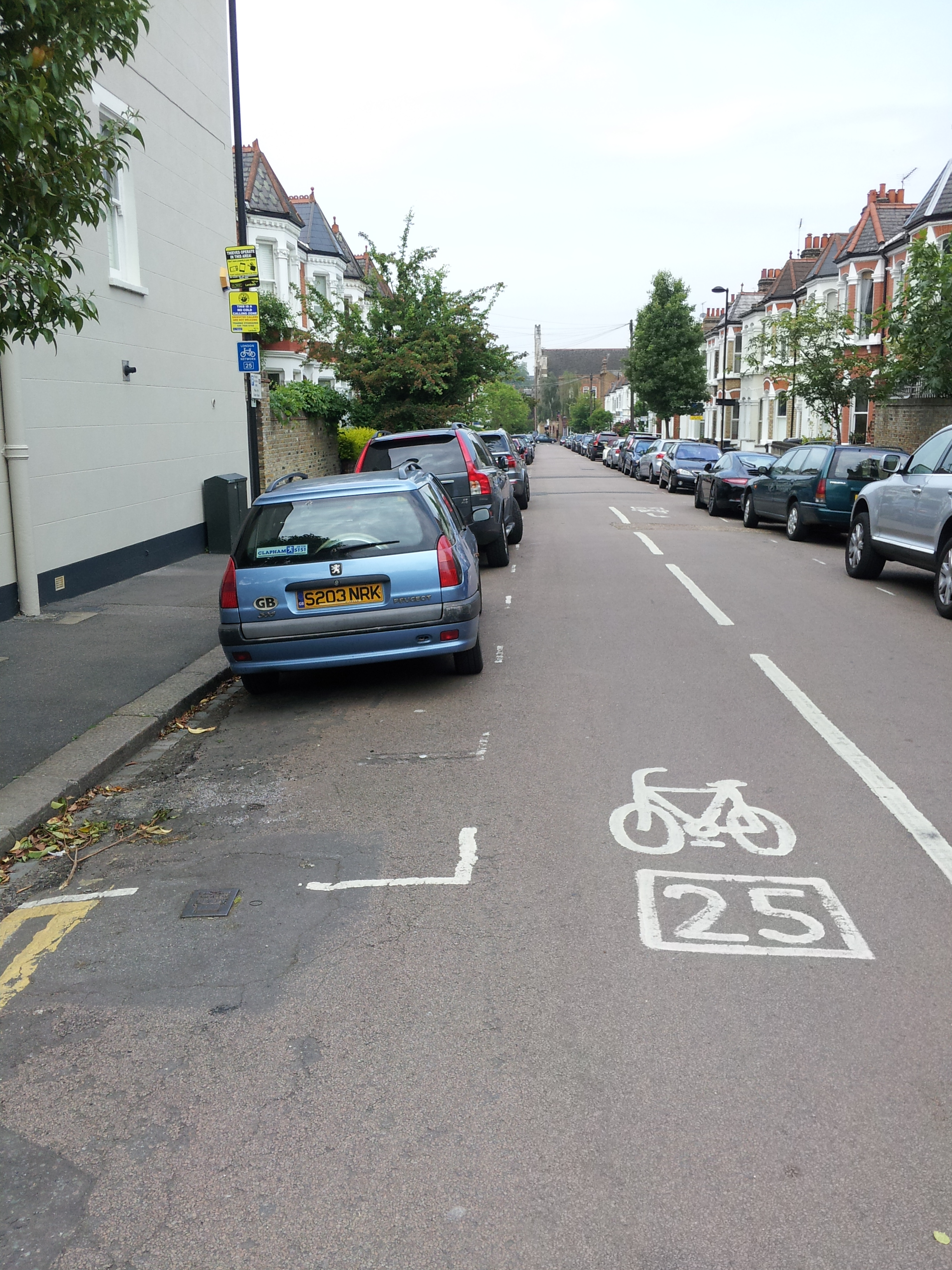
Examples of route confirmation signage and road markings for London Cycle Network routes.

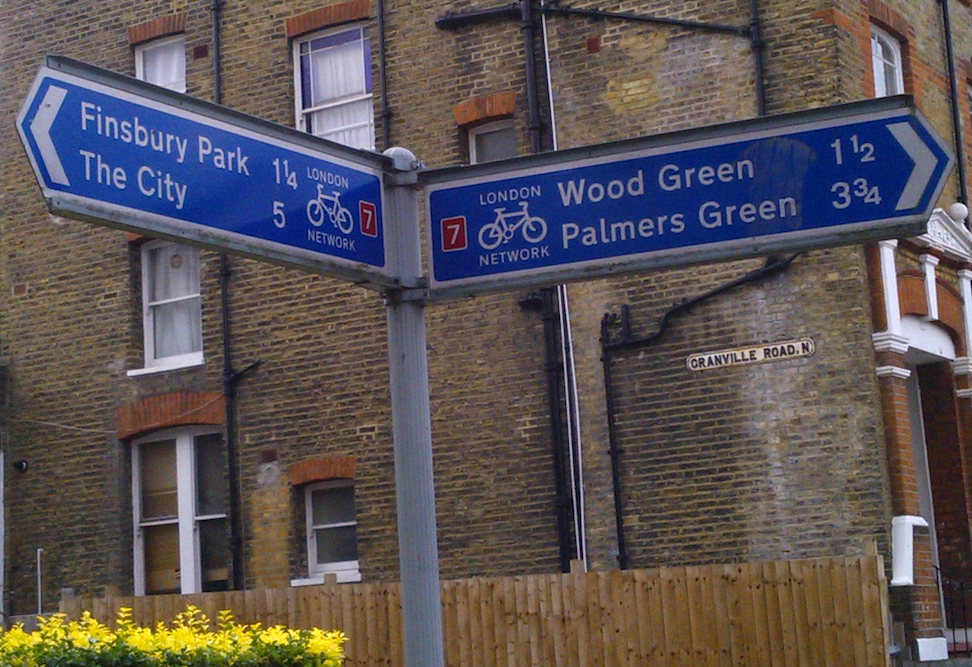
Other signage for LCN routes including Directions, Destinations and Distances

The London Cycle Network Plus (LCN+) aimed to provide a 900 kilometre network of cycle routes throughout Greater London. It was funded by Transport for London and managed by the LCN+ Project Team at the London Borough of Camden. It was launched in 2001, replacing the earlier London Cycle Network (LCN) project (which had begun rollout in 1981, originally planning 3000 miles of signposted routes), and wound up in 2010.

Although some LCN routes have been upgraded to TfL's new Quietways and Cycle Superhighways, the majority throughout Greater London still exist and are signposted and/or indicated by carriageway markings (although not all the signage uses route numbers). Where route numbers are used in signs, this is usually the LCN route number, but on some route sections the 'LCN+ link' number has been used on signs. (LCN+ link numbers were usually internal reference numbers used for project management.)

=== London Cycle Network routes ===
The LCN route numbering used a radial and orbital scheme, as shown by the groupings in the table below. Some routes were also part of the Sustrans National Cycle Network – these are signposted with route numbers on a red background. There were also a comparable number of un-numbered routes in the scheme. These are not listed in the table below.

The last edition of the LCN route map to be published was the 5th edition (2004).

Orbital routes in Central zone:
Route Number	Route	Notes	Map
0 (Seven Stations Circular)	City (→ Liverpool St.) – (Waterloo) – Westminster – Marylebone (→ Paddington) – Bloomsbury (→ Euston) – (→ King's Cross) – Finsbury – The City	A number of route sections are now part of new TfL routes: • the north end of Southwark bridge to Elephant and Castle: CS7 • outside St Thomas' Hospital: C56 • south side of Green Park: C3 • some of the Westminster section and all of the Camden section: C27 • Lever Street to Southwark Bridge: C11 and C	map
Radial routes in Central zone:
Route Number	Route	Notes	Map
1	Waltham Abbey – (Lea Valley) – Mile End – Greenwich – Greenwich Peninsula – Charlton Riverside – Woolwich – Thamesmead – Erith – (Dartford)	For the most part this is the Greater London portion of Sustrans NCN 1 but also includes additional sections, e.g. a route through Millwall Park.	map
2 (A2)	Elephant & Castle – Old Kent Road – Deptford – Greenwich – Blackheath – Kidbrooke – Eltham – Falconwood – Blackfen	Some sections are now Sustrans NCN 425 and C10 (see above)	map
^{⌊} 2a	Eltham station – Falconwood	Spur route off LCN 2 parallel to the A2 road, passing via Eltham station.	map
3 (old A3)	(Esher – Ditton) – Kingston – Wandsworth – Battersea – Clapham Common – Stockwell – Oval – Waterloo	Some sections were to become TfL Quietways Q4. A section in Kingston is now C28 (see above) and another in Lambeth is now C5 .	map
4	Hampton Court Bridge – Kingston – Ham – Richmond Park – Barnes – Putney Bridge – Sands End – West Chelsea – Pimlico – Lambeth Bridge – Waterloo – London Bridge – Rotherhithe – Canada Water – Deptford – Greenwich	For the most part this is the Greater London portion of Sustrans NCN 4	map
5 (old A5)	(Elstree) – Edgware – Kilburn – Maida Vale – Marylebone – Hyde Park – Knightsbridge – Chelsea Bridge – Battersea – Clapham – Streatham – Norbury – Croydon	Portions in South London will become C5 . Section across Chelsea Bridge/alongside Battersea Park is now CS8	map
6	Barnet – Alexandra Palace – Holloway – Tufnell Park – Camden Town – West End – Waterloo		map
^{⌊} 6a	Highgate – Gospel Oak – Camden Town – Westminster		map
7	(Southgate) – Wood Green – (Finsbury Park) – City – Elephant & Castle	Section past Finsbury Park is NCN 162 . Section from St George's Circus, across Blackfriars Bridge along Farringdon Road is now C6	map
8	Hammersmith – (Paddington) – Angel – London Fields – Hackney – Leyton – Leytonstone – (Woodford)	Includes Market Porters & 7 Stations. The portion between King's Cross Road and London Fields is now C27	map
9	City – Broadway Market – London Fields – Hackney – Walthamstow – Chingford – Epping	The portion between London Fields and Millfields Park South is now C27 ; the section between Virginia Road and Hackney Town Hall is now C13 .	map
Radial routes in North East London:
Route Number	Route	Notes	Map
10 (A10)	Waltham Cross – Enfield – Tottenham – Seven Sisters – Stoke Newington – The City	The majority of this route between the City and Tottenham has been upgraded to form C1	map
11 (A11)	City – Stratford – Leytonstone – (Woodford) – Epping	This route has been upgraded to C2 between Aldgate and Stratford	map
12 (A12)	City – Stratford – Ilford – Romford		map
13 (A13)	City – (Canning Town) – Rainham – Tilbury	Part of this route has now been upgraded to form part of C3 .	map
14 (A104)	Clapton – Lea Bridge – Whipps Cross – Woodford	A portion of the route has been upgraded to C23 .	map
15	City – Canning Town – Plaistow – Barking – (Upminster)	The section between Tower Bridge and Canning Town has been upgraded to form C3	map
16	Cambridge Heath – Victoria Park – Stratford – West Ham – Newham Greenway, Beckton	The section along The Greenway is now Quietway Q22	map
Radial routes in South East London:
Route Number	Route	Notes	Map
17	Greenwich Park – Lewisham – Catford – Beckenham, West Wickham	Shares route of Sustrans NCN 21 (Waterlink Way) between Elverson Road DLR station and Loampit Vale, Lewisham	map
18	Greenwich – Woolwich – Erith – Dartford		map
19	Charlton – Greenwich – Plumstead – Bexleyheath – Dartford		map
20	Deptford – Lewisham – Mottingham – New Eltham – Crittall's Corner		map
21	Greenwich – Lewisham – Ladywell – Catford – Lower Sydenham – Kent House – (Elmers End) – Addington – New Addington	Greater London portion of Sustrans NCN 21 along Waterlink Way	map
22	Central London – Peckham Rye – Catford – Bromley – Orpington	One section in Bermondsey (Willow Walk/Lynton Road) is now part of C10 . In summer 2020, the section between Peckham and Burgess Park was upgraded to C35 .	map
23 (A23)	Central London – Camberwell – Crystal Palace – Croydon – Purley	Northern section (Elephant and Castle to Southwark Bridge) is now TfL Cycle Superhighway CS7 and C17 follows some of LCN 23 also.	map
24	(Wandsworth) – Carshalton		map
25; South Circular	Woolwich – Catford – Dulwich Village – Herne Hill – Clapham Common – (Barnes)		map
^{⌊} 25a		Spur route off LCN 25.	map
26	(Willesden) – Hammersmith – (Wandsworth) – Streatham – Crystal Palace – Eltham	This route is an 'orbital' one in south London from Shepherd's Bush in the west, to Eltham in the south east, but it is non-continuous with several gaps.	map
27 (Part A21)	Battersea – Crystal Palace – Bromley – Sevenoaks		map
28	Greenwich – Lee – Bromley		map
Radial routes in South West London:
Route Number	Route	Notes	Map
29	Wandsworth – Wimbledon – Sutton		map
30	A30, Staines – (Osterley)		map
31	A3 Kingston by-pass parallel, Leatherhead – (Hook) – (New Malden) – Hammersmith		map
32	Hayes – Hounslow – (Whitton)? – Kingston – (Ewell)		map
33	Richmond – Kingston – (Chessington) – Leatherhead		map
Radial routes in North West London:
Route Number	Route	Notes	Map
34	(Sunbury) – Hounslow – (Southall)		map
35	A315 – Staines – Hounslow – (Chiswick) – Hammersmith		map
36	A316 – (Sunbury) – Twickenham – Hammersmith	The section between Woodberry Wetlands and Walthamstow Wetlands was branded the 'Wetlands to Wetlands Greenway' in 2016.	map
37	A316 parallel, (Feltham) – Twickenham – Richmond – (Wandsworth) – Central London		map
38	Wimbledon – Putney – Westminster	Short section past Victoria will be part of Quietway Q15	map
39	A4020 Uxbridge Road – Uxbridge – Southall – Hanwell – Ealing – (Shepherd's Bush) – Hyde Park – Mayfair – West End		map
40	A40 (Hillingdon) – (Greenford) – (Hanger Lane) – Bayswater – Paddington – Central London		map
41	(Hayes) – Ealing – Uxbridge Road parallel, (Acton)		map
42	(Hayes) – Westminster	Along Grand Union Canal	
43	(West Drayton) – (Hayes) – (Brentford)	Along Grand Union Canal	
44	A4 – Slough – (Osterley) – Hammersmith – (Hyde Park Corner)		map
45	Harrow – Wembley – Kensington – Battersea	In summer 2020, the section between Notting Hill and North Kensington was upgraded to C44 .	map
46	(Willesden) – (Fulham)		map
47	(Kenton) – Wembley – (Queen's Park)		map
48	(Stanmore) – (Kingsbury) – Wembley – Kilburn	The eastern half of this route is now Quietway Q3.	map
49	(Northwood) – (Pinner) – Harrow – (Hendon)		map
50	Potters Bar – (Hendon) – Regent's Park – Marylebone – St James's Park		map
51	(Friern Barnet) – (Golders Green)		map
Orbital routes in North East London:
Route Number	Route	Notes	Map
54	Muswell Hill – Wood Green – Tottenham Hale – Walthamstow		map
55	(Wanstead) – Ilford – Barking		map
56	Wood Green – Northumberland Park	The section between Bruce Castle Park and Tottenham Hotspur Stadium is now C1	map
57	Epping – Chigwell Row – Dagenham		map
58	Epping – Romford – (Rainham)		map
59	(Rainham) – (Harold Hill)	Proposed route, never implemented (?)	OSM map
60	Collier Row		map
61	(Bedfords Park) – Romford		map
Orbital routes in South East London:
Route Number	Route	Notes	Map
62	Greenwich – (Forest Hill) – Sydenham – Penge	Route signage does not use the route number	map
63	Greenwich – Bromley		map
64	The O2 – (Mottingham)		map
65	Westminster – Vauxhall – Kennington – Peckham Rye – Nunhead – Brockley – Hilly Fields – Ladywell – Ladywell Fields – Lee Green – Eltham – Avery Hill – Blackfen – Bexleyheath	Shares route through Ladywell Fields with NCN 21	map
66	Thamesmead – Plumstead Common – Falconwood – New Eltham – Chislehurst – Petts Wood		map, map (66a) & map (66b)
^{⌊} 66a		Spur route off LCN 66 to the Thames Path.	map
^{⌊} 66b		Spur route off LCN 66 to the Thames Path	map
67	Woolwich – Bromley (Chislehurst)		map
68	(Abbey Wood) – Bexley		map & map (68a)
69	Orpington – (Bexley) – Dartford		map
Orbital routes in South West London:
Route Number	Route	Notes	Map
71	East Sheen Common – Roehampton – Wimbledon Park		map
73	Kingston Vale – Wimbledon – Croydon		map
74	Hampton Hill – Kingston – Wimbledon – Mitcham/Colliers Wood		map
75	Ealing – Twickenham – Kingston – Sutton – Croydon – Bromley – Eltham – Woolwich	A section of the route in Hounslow is now C42 .	map
76	(Ewell) – Sutton – Croydon – Orpington		map
77	(Ewell) – (South Croydon) – (New Beckenham)		map
78	Forestdale – Sanderstead		map
Orbital routes in North West London:
Route Number	Route	Notes	Map
84	(Park Royal) – (Hendon)		
85	Ealing – (Hanger Lane) – Hendon – Barnet		map
86	(Sudbury) – (Perivale) – Ealing – (Brentford)		map
87	(Rayners Lane) – Greenford Broadway – Hanwell – (Brentford)		map
88	West section: A312, Feltham – (Hayes by pass), – (South Ruislip) – (Rayners Lane) – Edgware; East section: Chipping Barnet - Enfield Chase - Chingford		map
^{⌊} 88a	Northolt Park – Yeading – Hayes – Harlington	Alternative route alignment for LCN 88.	map
89	(Heathrow) – (West Drayton) – Uxbridge – (Hatch End) – (Stanmore) – Barnet		map
Other routes:
Route Number	Route	Notes	Map
99	Hatton – Feltham	Signposted as 99, but is really a completed section of Hounslow's LCN link +99	map
162	Finsbury Park – Highbury Fields	Shares most of its route with the old LCN 7. The route was never way-marked on the ground and appears to have been de-designated as a National Cycle Network route by Sustrans in 2020.	map
212	Wandle Park – central Croydon – Ashburton Park	Croydon Parks Link, sections opened 2016, 2017. Previously referred to as a National Cycle Network route, but appears to have been de-designated by Sustrans in 2020 (the situation being unclear as the route had already been omitted from their mapping prior to that).	map map
213	Selhurst – South Norwood	Croydon route along A213 that ends at borough border.	map
222	Broad Green – (Elmers End)	Croydon route along A222 that ends at borough border.	map
232	Wandle Park – central Croydon – Lloyd Park	Croydon Parks Link, sections opened 2016, 2017. Part of route is along A232. Previously referred to as a National Cycle Network route, but appears to have been de-designated by Sustrans in 2020 (the situation being unclear as the route had already been omitted from their mapping prior to that).	map
755	(Mitcham Eastfields) – Norbury – Thornton Heath	Croydon route that ends at borough border.	map
777	(Mitcham Common) – Thornton Heath	Croydon route that ends at borough border.	map

== National and international routes ==
=== National Cycle Network routes ===
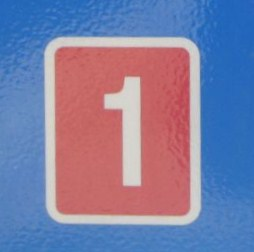
Route number design for NCN routes. Unlike local or regional routes, NCN routes use a red background.

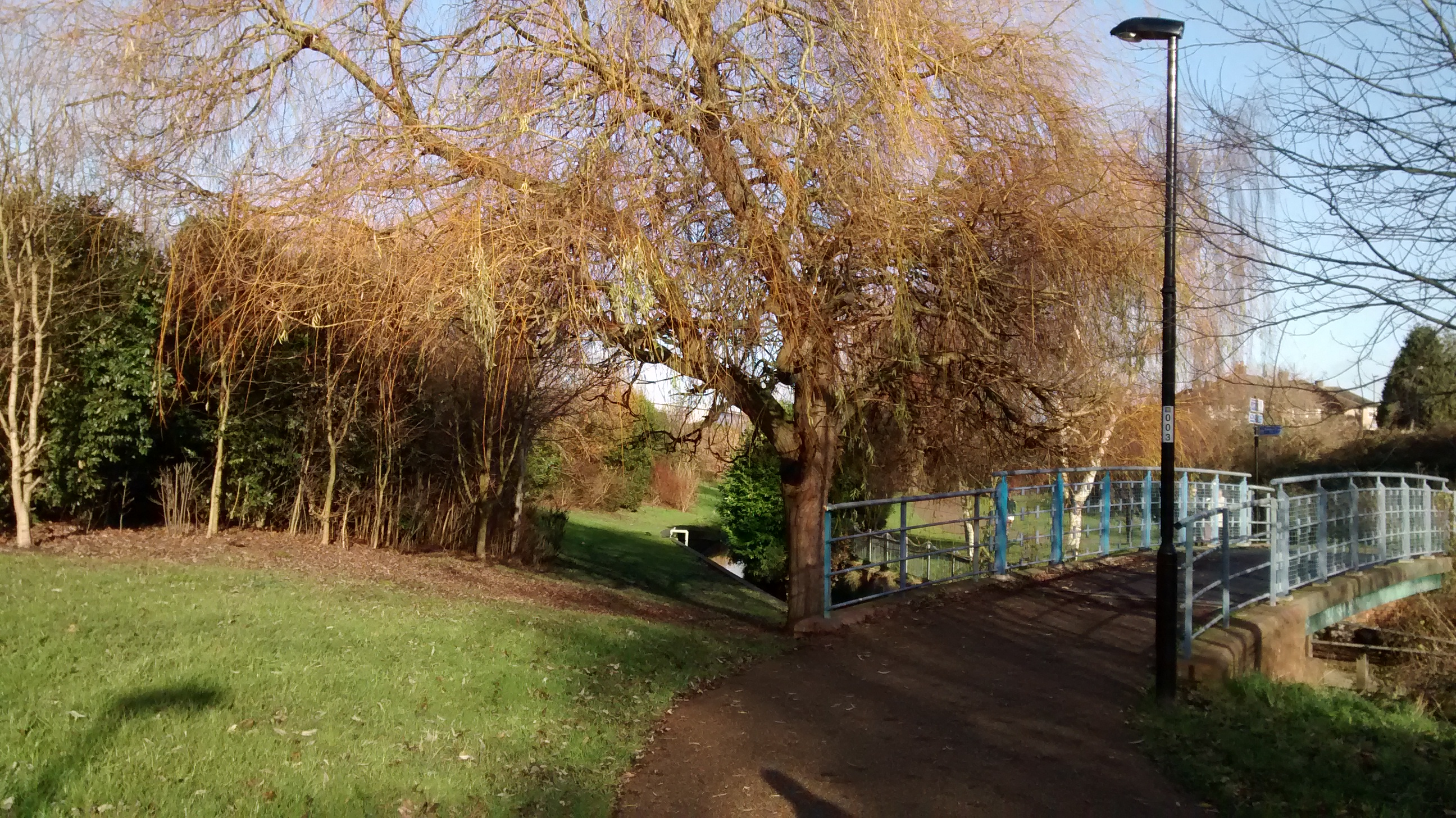
The Waterlink Way, a traffic-free cycle route in Lewisham, is also part of the National Cycle Network.

The sustainable transport charity Sustrans describe their National Cycle Network (NCN) as "a network of safe traffic-free paths and quiet on-road cycling" that "criss-cross the country, linking up villages, towns and cities". Eleven of these pass through London. NCN routes are signed with white lettering on a blue background, save for the route number, set on a small red rectangle. In July 2020 Sustrans de-designated nearly a quarter of its National Cycle Network on safety grounds, including some in London. Alternative text

Route Number	National Route Description	Route through London	Notes	Maps
1	Shetland to Dover	Waltham Abbey along the River Lea via Tottenham to the Isle of Dogs, through Greenwich Foot Tunnel, Thames Path from Greenwich to Dartford	Also serves as part of international routes EuroVelo 2 and EuroVelo 12 (see below), and was London Cycle Network route LCN1. In 2019, a section in Greenwich was co-designated Q14.	map
^{⌊} 12	Enfield Lock to Spalding	Enfield Lock to Hadley Wood	Development as the "Enfield Island Village to Hadley Wood Greenway"	map
^{⌊} 13	London to Norwich	Tower Bridge – Barking – Rainham – Purfleet	Shares part of its route with TfL's C3	map
^{⌊} 136	—	Rainham to Noak Hill via Upminster		map
20	London to Brighton	Wandle Trail from Wandsworth – Carshalton, then on to Coulsdon	The international Avenue Verte from London to Paris follows NCN20; TfL's unsigned Quietway 4 shares the route of NCN20 between Earlsfield and the Wandle Meadow Nature Park	map
^{⌊} 208	—	Wimbledon to Rosehill		map
21	London to Eastbourne	Waterlink Way from Greenwich – Lewisham – Catford – (Elmers End) – (New Addington) – Crawley		map
4	Fishguard to London	Thames Path between Greenwich and Hampton Court Bridge	Also serves as part of international route EuroVelo 2 (see below), and was London Cycle Network route LCN4. In March 2020, a section in Bermondsey was co-designated as TfL's C14 .	map
^{⌊} 425	—	Burgess Park in Camberwell to Durand's Wharf in Rotherhithe	8.1 km route built with a grant from the National Lottery. Some of the central section also became C10 (formerly Q1). In summer 2020, a section between Burgess Park and Q1 was co-designated C35 .	map
6	Uxbridge to Milton Keynes		There have been intentions to extend this route into Central London via the Paddington Arm of the Grand Union Canal.	map
^{⌊} 61	Maidenhead to Rye House		Passes along the western edge of London, running between Maidenhead and Rye House.	map

=== International Cycle Network routes ===
Per the notes column above, sections of the National Cycle Network are co-opted by the European Cyclists' Federation as forming part of their international EuroVelo network, which is largely aimed at promoting cycling tourism in Europe. Additionally the Avenue Verte international route between London and Paris begins in central London.

Neither EV2 nor EV12 are signed as EuroVelo routes, so cyclists would instead need to rely on the relevant national route (NCN) signage.

Logo	Route name	Comment	via these UK cities/towns	Through these countries
	EuroVelo 2 – The Capitals Route	Follows the course of NCN 4 along the River Thames from west London to Greenwich, and then follows NCN 1 northwards towards Colchester.	Holyhead - Bristol - Bath - Reading - London - Harwich	Ireland, United Kingdom, Netherlands, Germany, Poland, Belarus, Russia
	EuroVelo 12 – North Sea Cycle Route	Within London this follows the course of NCN 1 , passing along the River Thames from Dartford to Greenwich and then continuing northwards towards Colchester.	Dover - Canterbury - London - Norwich - Hull - Newcastle - Edinburgh - Aberdeen - Inverness	Norway, Sweden, Denmark, Germany, Netherlands, Belgium, France, United Kingdom
A c A	Avenue Verte	Beginning at the London Eye, this mainly follows NCN 4 , NCN 20 , NCN 21 and NCN 2 as it passes through south London, Surrey, West Sussex and East Sussex.	London - Redhill - Crawley - Forest Row - Heathfield - Hailsham - Newhaven	United Kingdom, France

== Greenways ==
London's "Greenways" are a loosely defined collection of mostly traffic-free shared cycling and walking routes, predominantly within (or connecting to) various parks and open spaces within Greater London. TfL and Sustrans claimed that "Greenways should be suitable for use by a novice adult cyclist, a family with young children or a sensible, unaccompanied 12-year-old".

Greenways in London have been developed by numerous different bodies, including Sustrans (who began the Greenways initiative in 1994), Transport for London, the Canal and River Trust, the London Boroughs, the Royal Parks, the Lee Valley Regional Park Authority and the 2012 Olympic Delivery Authority, under various different funding programmes (including the 2009–2014 London Greenways scheme, the 2012 Games Walking and Cycling Routes programme, 'Connect2', the National Cycle Network, and others).

The routes tend to have names rather than numbers, and many of them use waymarking signs or markers in the carriageway, but there is no consistent scheme covering all of them. Some of the Greenways have been co-opted into the other TfL or Sustrans schemes listed earlier in this article.

The table below lists the most notable Greenways in London.

London Greenway routes:
Name	Description	Map
Routes in or connecting to parks, green spaces and nature reserves:
Tamsin Trail.	Circular route around Richmond Park	map
Avery Hill Park	New and improved cycling and walking routes through this park in Greenwich.	map
Ravensbourne Greenway	Route alongside the River Ravensbourne through Beckenham Place Park in Lewisham.	map
‡ Hackney Parks	Connects Finsbury Park, Clissold Park, Hackney Downs, Victoria Park and the Queen Elizabeth Olympic Park at Stratford. Some of the section between Hackney Downs and Victoria Park is now C27 .	map
Redbridge Greenway.		map
River Beam Bridge	Shared-use foot/cycle bridge over the River Beam, linking the Beam Valley Country Park with Bretons Outdoor Centre.	map
Feltham Park, Longford River	New bridge and improved shared use paths.	
Jubilee Greenway, Woolwich Foot Tunnel	Various infrastructure improvements on the Jubilee Greenway and associated routes between C3 and the Woolwich Foot Tunnel.	
Greendale Extension	New link from the Greendale (LCN23) to Ruskin Park.	
‡ Epping Forest Greenway	Route from Stratford to Epping Forest. Skirts the boundaries of West Ham cemetery, Wanstead Flats, Harrow Road playing fields, Bush Wood and Leyton Flats.	map
Wetlands to Wetlands Greenway	Cycling route between Woodberry Wetlands and Walthamstow Wetlands. Much of the on-road section between the two wetlands follows the route of LCN36.	map
Stanmore to River Thames Greenway	Proposed Greenway with some completed sections, included Proyer's Path through Northwick Park, Harrow.	
Enfield Chase to Arnos Park Greenway	Route in Enfield linking several green spaces Enfield Golf Club and Grovelands Park.	
Durant's Park to Brimsdown Greenway	Route in Enfield	
River corridors:
Roding Valley Way.	Follows the green corridor of the River Roding.	map
The Wandle Trail	Follows the green corridor of the River Wandle. Cycle and walking sections sometimes diverge; the cycle sections are mostly part of NCN20.	map
Hogsmill River Greenway	Greenway linking Tolworth and Old Malden	map
‡ Lower Lea Valley	Runs from the Olympic Park via the Greenway in Newham to the Greenwich Foot Tunnel on the Isle of Dogs.	map
Sewer corridors:
‡ Newham Greenway	Also known as the 'Elevated Greenway'. Route from Stratford to Beckton built on top of the Northern Outfall Sewer. Most of the route is now designated Q22 (formerly LCN16)–see above.	
The Ridgeway	Route from Plumstead to Crossness built on top of the Southern Outfall Sewer.	
Canal towpaths:
‡ Lee Valley North	Sections of the River Lee towpath, upgraded for the 2012 Olympics	map
Regent's Canal towpath.	Towpath of a portions of the Regent's Canal	
‡ Limehouse Cut	Towpath of the Limehouse Cut waterway.	map

‡ These routes were developed for the 2012 Summer Olympic Games

== See also ==
- Cycling in London
- Cycling network
- Santander Cycles
- National Cycle Network
- Cycleways in England
- List of cycleways
- London greenways
- Segregated cycle facilities
