= National Cycle Route 21 =

Cycle route in the United Kingdom

Coordinates: 51°11′10″N 0°9′7″W

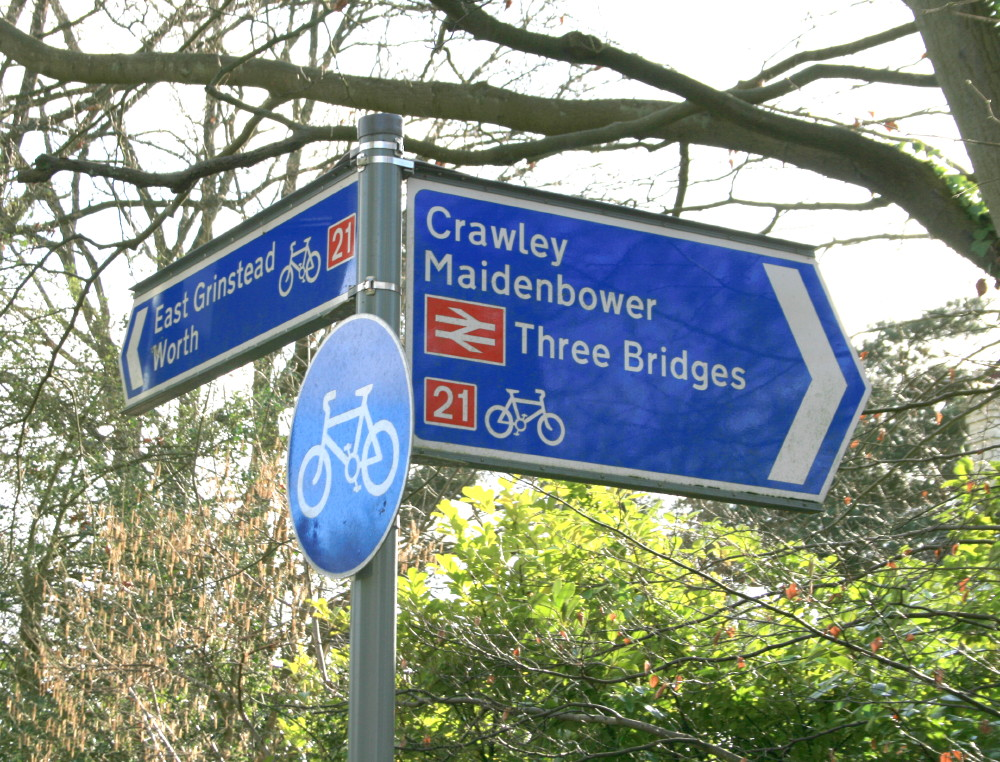
NCR 21 sign near Crawley

National Cycle Route 21 (or NCR 21) is part of the United Kingdom's National Cycle Network. It runs from Greenwich in South-East London south to Crawley, then east to Groombridge and south to Eastbourne, with a short final loop northwards again to its end at Pevensey.

The route is approximately 150 km (93 miles) long. Several sections are not suitable for road bikes.

Links to:

- National Cycle Route 4 at Greenwich which is the route's start.
- National Cycle Route 1 at Greenwich is a few hundred metres from the route's start.
- National Cycle Route 2 at Polegate and at Pevensey at the route's finish.
- National Cycle Route 20 at Redhill and at Crawley.

The route forms much of the English section of the Avenue Verte, a planned long-distance cycle route linking London and Paris.

== Route ==
=== Greenwich to Crawley ===
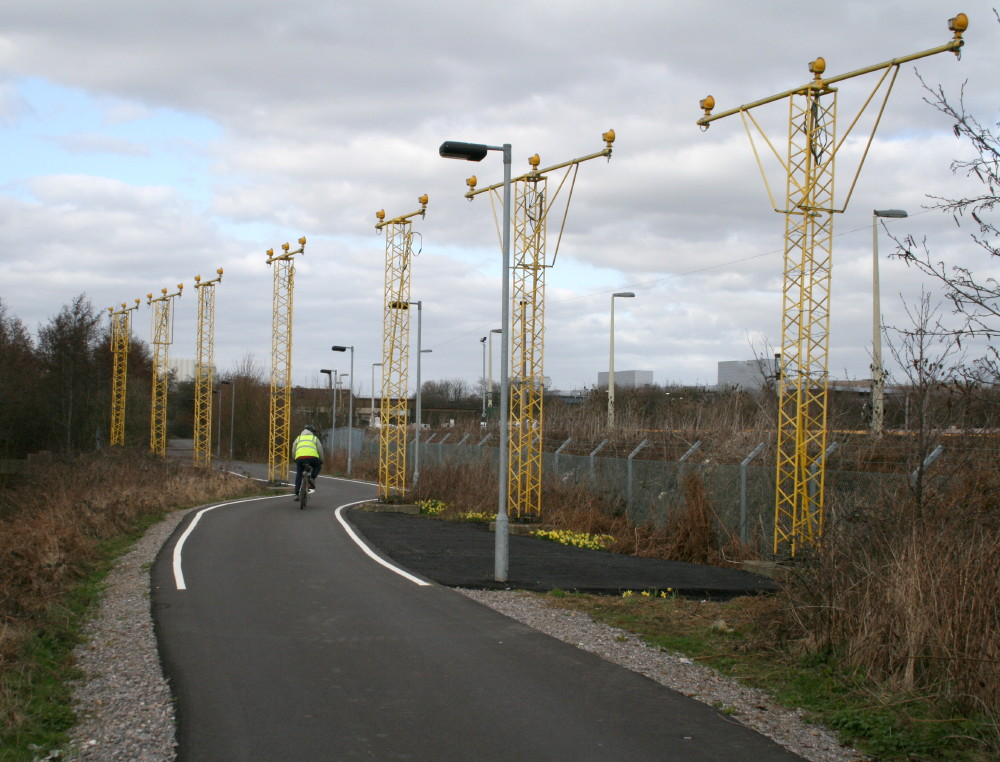
NCR 21 passing the runway approach lights at Gatwick Airport

Greenwich | Lewisham | South Norwood | New Addington | Redhill | Horley | Gatwick Airport | Crawley

This section starts by leaving NCR 4 beside the River Thames and following the Waterlink Way south through South-East London, generally on well-surfaced bridleways and residential roads and climbing gently. On leaving Greater London the route quickly becomes more rugged, following a number of paths and roads, including the long access road to Woldingham School. After passing under the M25 motorway the track quality improves again and the route heads west to Redhill, before again heading south, close by the London-Brighton railway. It passes directly underneath the South Terminal of Gatwick Airport, weaves through the runway approach lights and continues south to Crawley.

Between Redhill and Crawley the route duplicates Route 20.

=== Crawley to Groombridge ===
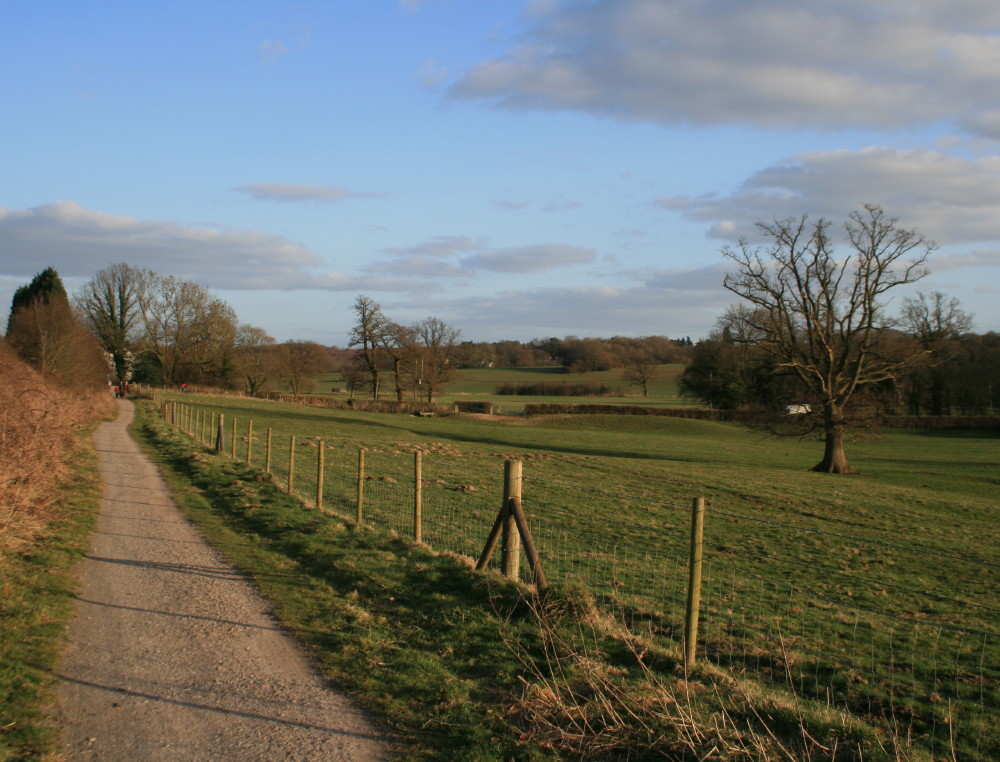
NCR 21, near Groombridge

Crawley | Crawley Down | East Grinstead | Groombridge

This section is largely on well-made railway paths through attractive countryside and consists of the Worth Way immediately followed by the Forest Way. It finishes just south of Groombridge, with a short signposted spur to the village itself.

=== Groombridge to Eastbourne ===
Groombridge | Rotherfield | Mayfield | Heathfield | Hailsham | Polegate | Eastbourne

The first half of this section is on undulating country roads, passing by Eridge Station. About one mile before Eridge Station is a spur connecting Crowborough with the route. After Mayfield there is a steep off-road section. The route then follows the whole length of the Cuckoo Trail from Heathfield to Eastbourne, crossing NCR 2 at Polegate.

=== Eastbourne to Pevensey ===
Eastbourne | Pevensey

The route follows the coast up from the east side of Eastbourne, passing the harbour, to Pevensey, where it meets NCR 2.

== See also ==
- Avenue Verte
