= Cycling in Paris =

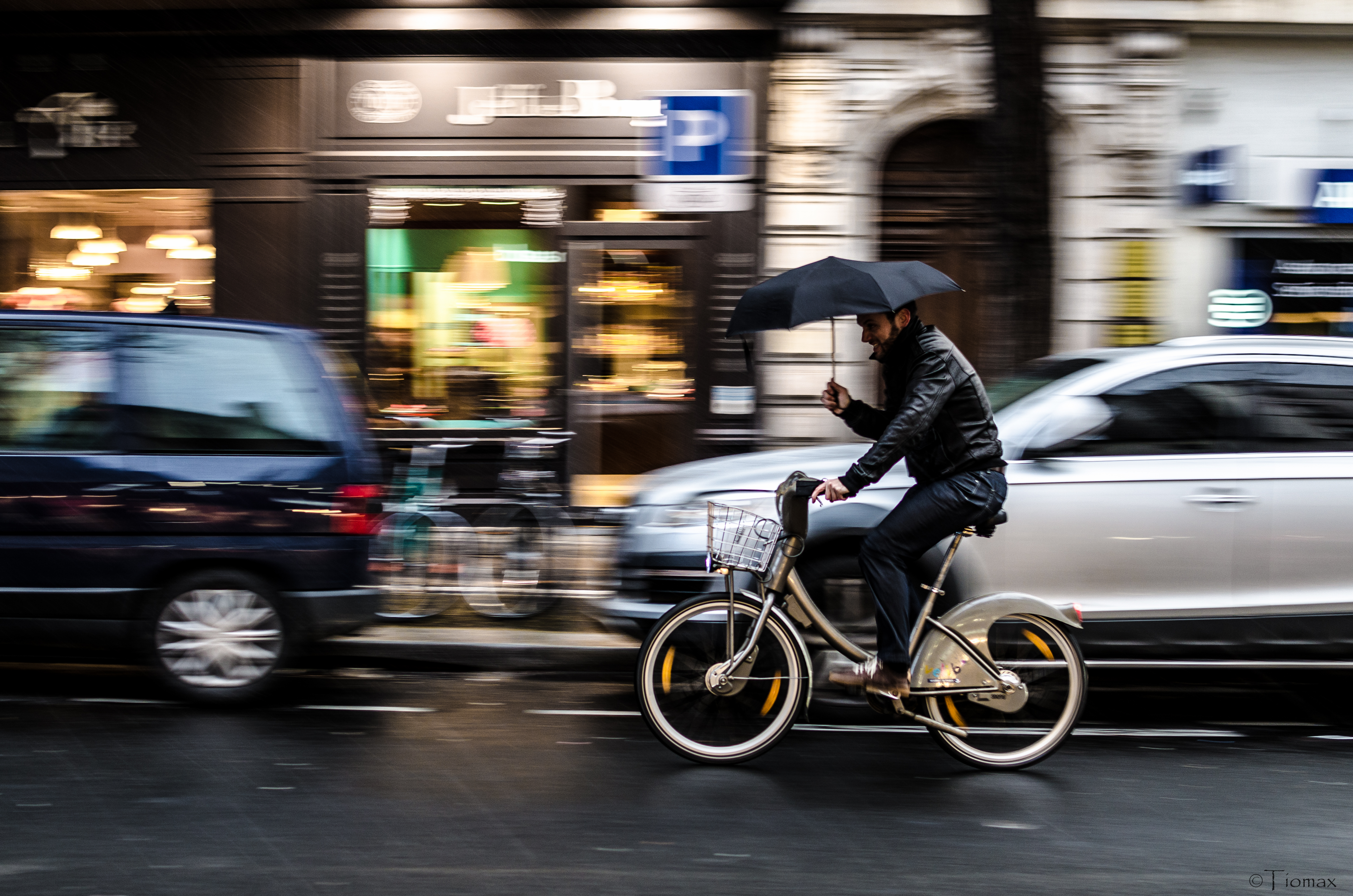
A cyclist in Paris, 2013

Cycling is a common means of transportation, sport, and recreation in Paris, France. As of 2021, about 15% of trips in the city are made by bicycle, taking place on over 1,000 km (620 mi) of cycling paths. The Tour de France, the largest sporting event in cycling, finishes on the Champs-Élysées. Four major recreational cycling routes—EuroVelo 3, Avenue Verte, the Seine à Vélo, and the Veloscenic—pass by Notre-Dame Cathedral.

== History ==
Following an accident between a horse-drawn carriage and a velocipede on rue Saint-Antoine, a judgment handed down in May 1869 fined the velocipedist one franc, in accordance with article 113 of the ordinance of 25 July 1862, which banned "games involving skittles, palets, barrels, etc." from the streets. This judgement meant velocipedes were banned from the streets of Paris. The Prefect of Police, Léon Renault, lifted the ban with an ordinance on 9 November 1874 that equated a velocipede with a carriage, and thus required it to be equipped with a lantern, bell and license plate.

In 1869, Richard Lesclide, the editor of the Le Vélocipède illustré, organized the world's first city-to-city bicycle road race, from Paris to Rouen. It took place on 7 November 1869 and counted 323 participants. The race was won by James Moore with a time of 10 hours and 45 minutes.

After having nearly disappeared in the 1980s, when cars were 85 times more frequent than cycling, the number of cyclists in Paris has grown since the 1990s.

== Cycleways and routes ==
There are 1,000 km (620 mi) of cycle paths and routes in Paris. These include piste cyclable (bike lanes separated from other traffic by physical barriers such as a kerb) and bande cyclable (a bicycle lane denoted by a painted path on the road). Since 2008, 29 km (18 mi) of specially marked bus lanes are also open to cyclists. Cyclists have also been given the right to ride in both directions on certain one-way streets in 20 mph zones.

Paris' bike routes are detailed in guides such as Paris de Poche: Cycliste et Piéton (i.e. Pocket Paris: Cyclist and Pedestrian) which costs about €5 or Paris à Velo (i.e. Paris by bike), available for free from Paris town hall offices.

=== Voies vertes ===
Some of the French cycle routes known as voies vertes (literally "greenways") pass through Paris. One is the Piste du canal de L'Ourcq (the Ourcq canal path) which runs 97 km (60 mi) through Paris to Sevran.

=== EuroVelo and other international routes ===
The long-distance cycle path EuroVelo 3 passes through Paris. Dubbed the "Pilgrim's Route", it runs between Santiago de Compostela in Spain and Trondheim in Norway.

Other international routes that pass through Paris include the Avenue Verte route, which runs between Paris and London. The Avenue Verte crosses the English Channel at Dieppe via the Newhaven – Dieppe ferry.

== Vélib' ==
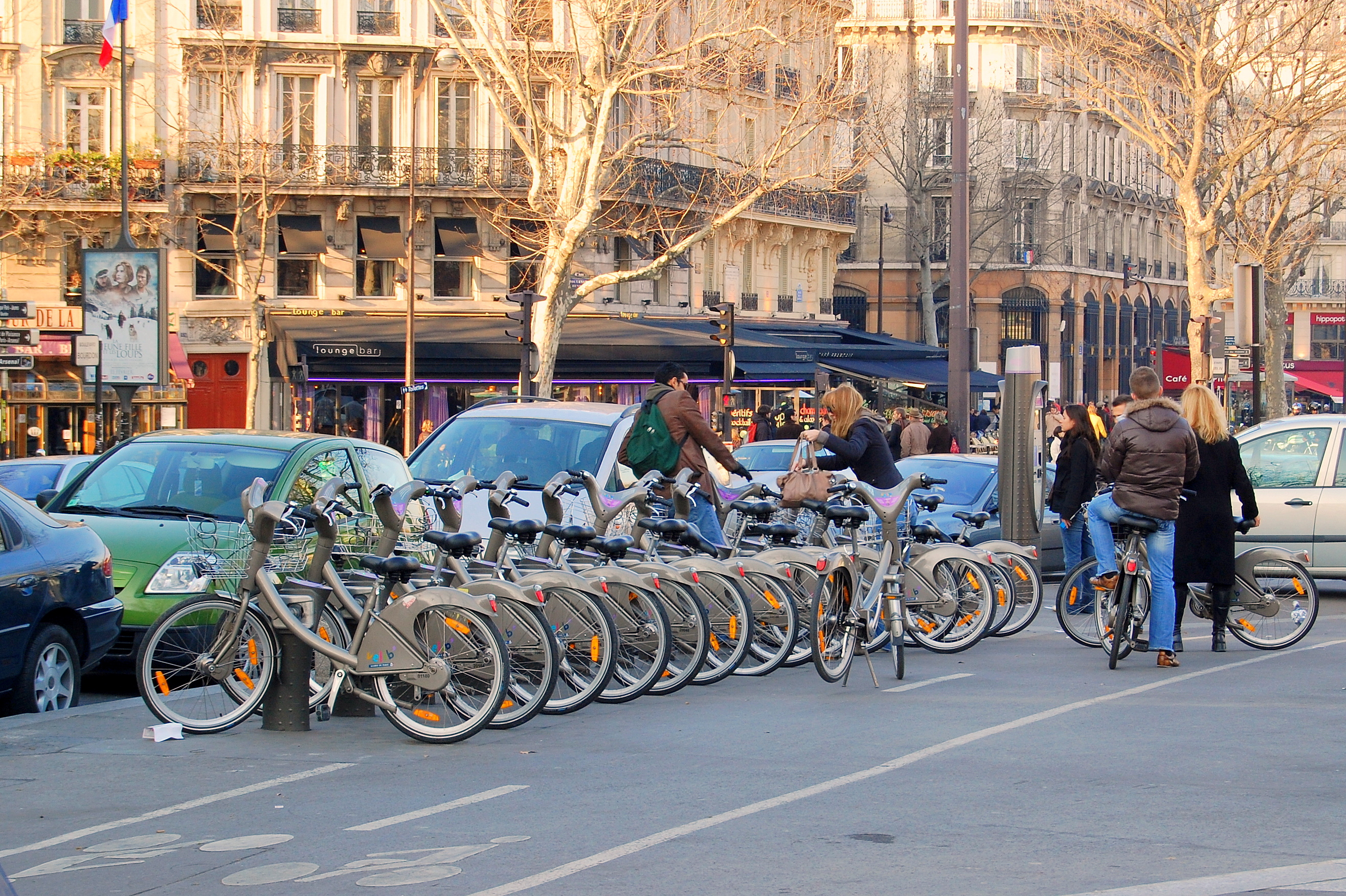
Vélib' at Place de la Bastille.

Following the successful examples of bicycle hire schemes in the cities of Rennes and Lyon, the city of Paris launched the Vélib' rental bikes system on 15 July 2007. Managed by the company JCDecaux, there were originally 10,648 bikes available at 750 Vélib' stations. More than 20,600 bikes at 1,451 stations are planned for late 2007 and Paris may eventually have 50,000 Vélib' bikes for hire.

In 2018, Velib' was rebranded as Vélib' Métropole, and is now operated by Smovengo. The switch between operators was defined by electrical and software issues that lasted for months, leading many users to abandon their memberships and seek reimbursement.

As of October 2023, 19,000 Velib' bikes are available (40% of which are electric) and there are 1,464 stations located in Paris and its adjoining suburbs. The service had 390,000 subscribers in 2022.

== Paris Respire ==
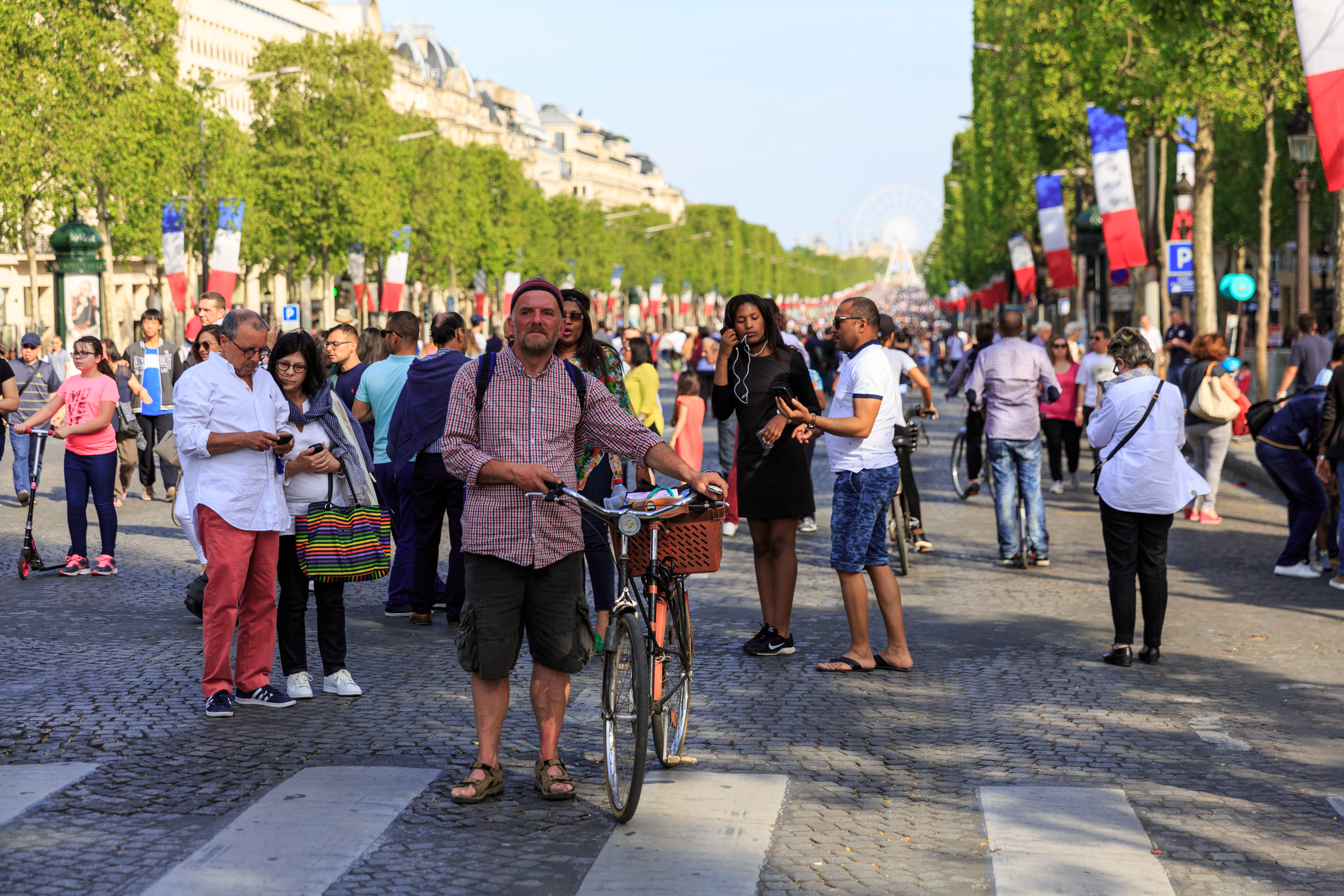
Pedestrians and cyclists on the Champs-Elysées during the first Paris Breathes day in 2016

Paris Respire (literally "Paris Breathes") is a car-free event where certain roads are closed to vehicular traffic on Sundays and public holidays between the hours of 9 am and 5 pm. The roads closed are in popular areas such as along the Seine River, in the Marais, the along the Canal Saint Martin and in Montmartre, as well as some other roads elsewhere in the city. Cycling and walking are the main forms of getting around on these roads on these days.

== Sports practice ==
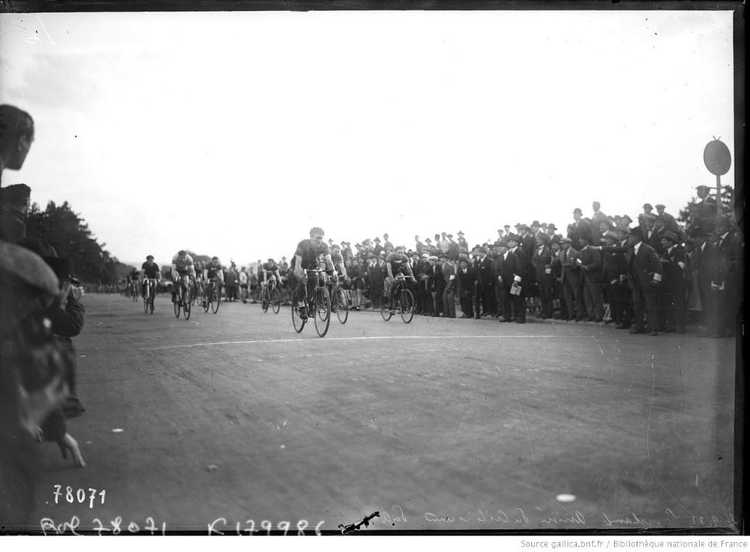
"Criterium des As" in 1922 at Lonchamp racetrack. The finishing line is still present today.

In Paris, there are two tracks where cyclists can practice racing. The first is an oval track of 3.6km located around the Longchamp Racecourse in the 16th district. It has been used by cyclists since the end of the 19th century, when the first cycling competitions began. Today, the track is the most used cycling segment in France on the sport application Strava and one of the most popular in the world. The second place is called the Polygone de Vincennes and it is located in the Bois de Vincennes in the 12th district of Paris. The track was recently refurbished.

== Government investment ==
=== Le Plan vélo de Paris (2015-2020) ===
Le Plan vélo de Paris (i.e. The Paris Bike Plan) was a 150 million euro investment by the city of Paris that aimed to double the length of bike paths in the city between 2015-2020.

The main focus of the plan was to increase the amount of bike paths and parking spots in the city, but the plan also included subsidies for residents to purchase electric bicycles and a focus on increasing opportunities for people to learn how to ride and maintain bikes.

Bicycle counters recorded an average increase in ridership of 47% between 2019 and 2020, and 22% between 2020 and 2021. On some routes, the increase between 2019 and 2020 was as high as 60%. By 2021, Paris had over 1,000km of bike lanes.

=== Le Plan vélo de Paris (2021-2026) ===
In October 2021, Paris Mayor Anne Hidalgo announced the second act of Le Plan vélo de Paris, which has a budget of 250 million euros and aims to add another 180 km of bike lanes to the city. Her goal is to make Paris "100% cyclable". The 180 km of new lanes includes the 50 km (31 mi) of temporary bike lanes that were constructed in Spring 2020 during the COVID-19 pandemic that will now be made permanent. The plan also includes the addition of 130,000 new bicycle parking spots.

Separately, the national government announced in 2023 that it will spend 2 billion euros on new bicycle infrastructure between 2023-2027. If the spending of local and regional authorities is also taken into account, the amount rises to 6 billion euros during the same time frame.

== See also ==
- Transport in Paris
- Cyclability
- 15-minute city
- Urban vitality
