= National Cycle Route 22 =

Cycle route in the United Kingdom

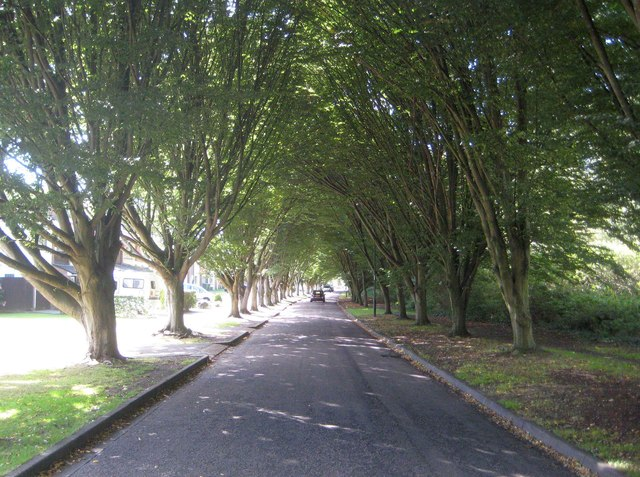

National Cycle Route 22 (NCR22) runs from Banstead to Brockenhurst in the New Forest via Dorking, Guildford, Farnham, Petersfield, Havant, Portsmouth, Ryde, Yarmouth and Lymington. Due to the route going over the Isle of Wight, ferry connections are required from Portsmouth to Ryde, and again from Yarmouth to Lymington.

== Route ==
=== Banstead to Dorking ===
The route branches off National Cycle Route 20 at Woodmansterne and goes through Banstead Village, crossing the A217 (Brighton Road) at a traffic light junction. It then passes south of Nork Park and north of Tattenham Corner railway station before heading south-southwest through the Epsom Downs Racecourse. It passes under the M25 motorway just before Headley Village, then continues through the North Downs before joining the A24 near Westhumble towards Dorking.

=== Dorking to Guildford ===
Dorking | Guildford

=== Guildford to Farnham ===
Guildford | Farnham

There is a busy one-way system in central Guildford, which takes the route over the River Wey. The route passes some small statues commemorating Lewis Carroll, a son of Guildford, as it goes over the River Wey. The statues are down on the west bank of the river, and are very small.

The route soon goes onto a quieter road (Grid reference SU993493), with a steep uphill which goes past the burial place of Lewis Carroll. Guildford has a statue for Through the Looking-Glass in a small garden to the east of Guildford Castle.

About 1 km out of Guildford, the route moves onto a Bridleway at Henley Fort, then touches the A31 briefly before heading south. The route passes near Watts Gallery, where there are some tea rooms, and then heads west through Puttenham. One can follow the B3000 to this point, or use a bridleway. At Puttenham, there are some opportunities for refreshment in the form of two pubs, one is a Harvester.

From Puttenham, the route follows Seale Lane, which runs just south of the Hogs Back (the A31). The road undulates. The road passes through Seale, where there is a craft centre. At SU895479, one take go northwest toward the Hogs Back Brewery (1 km) or continue directly west. The northern road has a steeper climb but bends west and within 2 km rejoins the road to Farnham at Runfold Manor.

West of Runfold, the road joins the A31 - which is a dual carriageway, the route therefore diverts south to cross the River Wey at SU861466 and go through Compton, and hence into Farnham.

=== Farnham to Petersfield ===
Farnham | Liss | Petersfield

=== Petersfield to Portsmouth ===
Petersfield | Havant | Portsmouth

=== Ryde to Yarmouth ===
Ryde | Newport | Yarmouth

=== Lymington to Brockenhurst ===
Lymington | The New Forest | Brockenhurst
