= National Cycle Route 20 =

Cycle route in the United Kingdom

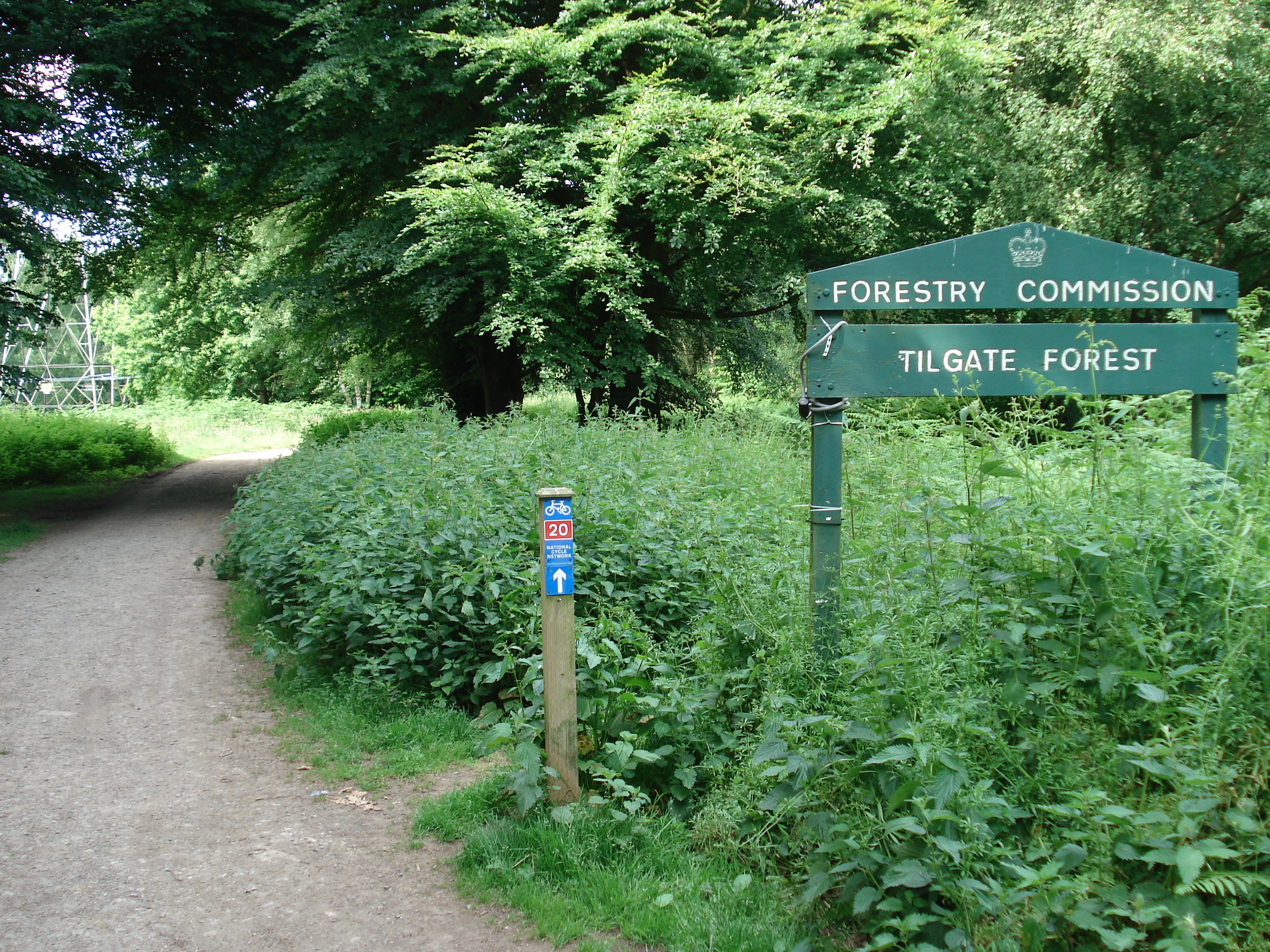
Former National Cycle Route 20 at Tilgate Forest, near Crawley, West Sussex

National Cycle Route 20 is part of the United Kingdom's National Cycle Network and follows the Wandle Trail in London.

It is the London – Brighton cycle route which starts alongside the river Thames at Wandsworth heading south along a mixture of roads and cycle paths to the southern side of the M25, here it combines with National Cycle Route 21 as far as Crawley. In July 2020, the route between Crawley and Pyecombe was removed from that national cycle network due to being of insufficient quality, as a result a small section remains in Crawley after Route 21 heads off East. The old route here still exists physically and is mostly made up of a dedicated cycle path beside the A23 dual carriageway, however parts use the B2118 and B2114 which can have fast moving traffic. At Pyecombe the official route returns using a cycle path beside the A23, once south of the A27 Brighton bypass the route mostly uses on road cycle lanes on the A23 all the way to the seafront where it meets National Cycle Route 2

Links to:

- National Cycle Route 2 at Brighton, the end of the route.
- National Cycle Route 4 at Wandsworth, the start of the route.
- National Cycle Route 21 at Redhill and at Crawley.
- National Cycle Route 22 at Banstead.
