= Cycleway 4 =

Cycle path in London, England

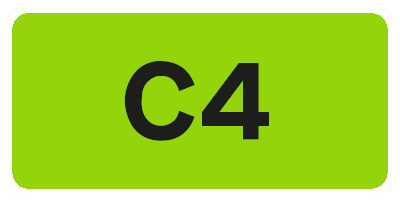
Cycleway 4

Route information
- Network: Cycleways
- Length: 4.6 miles (7.4 km)
- Direction: East–West
- Opened: 25 September 2020
- Owned by: Transport for London; Southwark Council; Lewisham Council; Greenwich Council
- Managed by: Transport for London
- Area served: City of London (Streetspace for London scheme); Southwark; Lewisham; Greenwich

Technical
- Segregation: Fully segregated
- Track type: Long distance cycle route

Cycleway 4 is a fully segregated cycle path in London originally planned to run from Tower Bridge to Woolwich and coordinated by Transport for London. First proposed in 2008 but first consulted on as Cycle Superhighway 4 between Tower Bridge and Greenwich in 2017, the cycle lane has been in lengthy development. The section from Tower Bridge to Rotherhithe Roundabout, and the section on Evelyn Street and Creek Road, has been built as a permanent scheme.

In response to the COVID-19 pandemic, TfL have extended Cycleway 4 in multiple places. Temporary, lightly segregated lanes using wands have been created on London Bridge, which has also been restricted to buses and cyclists only from 7am to 7pm, Monday to Friday. An extension of Cycleway 4 on Tooley Street and Duke Street Hill has been constructed to connect this to the permanent section at Tower Bridge. At the other end of the planned route, a temporary extension from the Royal Naval College, Greenwich, to Angerstein Roundabout has been built using light segregation, which is being extended again to Anchor and Hope Lane.

The future permanent construction of the other segments of the cycleway depends on TfL's healthy streets budget, which has had a £300 million decrease in available money due to the COVID-19 pandemic.

== Construction ==
Cycleway 4 route is built or will be built in different stages.

=== London Bridge to Tower Bridge ===
No permanent proposals have been put forward for this section of the route; however, in Autumn 2020 lightly segregated lanes were installed over London Bridge to Duke Street Hill. As part of the Streetspace for London programme, sections of lanes protected by wands and other minor improvements were installed along Tooley Street in March 2021.

=== Tower Bridge to Rotherhithe Roundabout ===
This section is the first completed section of Cycleway 4 and was opened on 25 September 2020. It consists of a fully segregated bidirectional path and was built between July 2019 and September 2020, with construction interrupted between March and June 2020 due to COVID-19. The section links up with Cycleway 14 to Canada Water, and Quietway 14 (which may become Cycleway 4), to Blackfriars Road, which further connects with Cycleway 6 on Blackfriars Road and Cycle Superhighway 7 on Southwark Bridge Road. The section will also connect with the Streetspace for London temporary cycle lane on Tooley Street.

=== Lower Road ===
This section of Cycleway 4 was not included in the original 2017 consultation, instead included in the Rotherhithe Movement Plan consultation in 2019, and is consequently further from construction. Southwark council is currently reviewing the consultation with TfL. A temporary version of Cycleway 4 will be implemented in order to respond to the COVID-19 pandemic. However, the construction was eventually delayed due to financial uncertainty of TfL. The construction works were started in November 2022 with the announcement from the Walking and Cycling Commissioner and the section was expected to be completed in the autumn of 2023.

=== Evelyn Street ===
The section was consulted on in the 2017 consultation but had not progressed to construction before the COVID-19 pandemic halted projects. A temporary version of this section was announced with construction planned to start in March 2021. However, this did not occur, with TfL instead announcing permanent construction of the lane beginning Summer 2021. The construction was completed and opened in September 2022.

=== Creek Road ===
Construction from Deptford Church Street to Norway Street in Greenwich started in November 2019 but was paused from March to December 2020 due to the pandemic. Construction has now restarted and a permanent lane was completed in May 2021. TfL requires additional work on the Creek Bridge in August 2021, which has caused a delay of opening for 14 weeks.

=== Greenwich Town Centre ===
Initial proposals for Greenwich Town Centre have been consulted on, involving converting the one way system to two way and pedestrianising College Approach and King William Walk. This would include an extension of Cycleway 4 from Norway Street to the Royal Naval College. However, no detailed proposals have been presented, and there is no available schedule for when works will start.

=== Royal Naval College to Anchor and Hope Lane ===
No permanent proposals have been presented for this section, however a temporary scheme has been implemented Initial ideas for the Angerstein Roundabout were included in TfL's Greenwich to Woolwich consultation in January 2020.

=== Anchor and Hope Lane to Woolwich Ferry Roundabout ===
A permanent scheme was consulted on in January 2020, involving a bidirectional cycle lane on the south side of the road containing safe junctions and bypassed roundabouts. The progress was paused due to TfL's financial uncertainty. In September 2023, TfL submitted a planning application with the detailed design of the cycleway to the Royal Borough of Greenwich council. The planning application states that TfL is expecting to start the construction in 2025.

== Route ==
=== Tower Bridge to Rotherhithe ===
The cycle lane starts with a single-direction, eastbound track from Tooley Street before the junction with Queen Elizabeth Street, before forming a bidirectional cycle lane on the north side of the carriageway at the Tower Bridge Road junction. Heading eastbound along Tooley Street, the cycle lane reaches Tanner Street, where it connects with Quietway 14 and Cycleway 14. It continues east down Jamaica Road and bypasses the Abbey Street junction with bike pocket turnings, crosses the St James's Road crossroads and passes opposite Bermondsey tube station. It then switches to the opposite side of the road at Southwark Park Road in order to bypass the Rotherhithe Roundabout. Where it meets Lower Road, a set of traffic lights allow cyclists to continue towards Greenwich on the other side of the road until the Lower Road segment is constructed.

=== Royal Naval College to Angerstein Roundabout ===
The cycle lane begins at the Greenwich side of the naval college, before passing through the college on the main east to west shared path. This section is only open from 7am-7pm, with cyclists forced to use the unprotected Romney Road at other times. It continues as an unprotected route along Old Woolwich Road before reaching the junction with Trafalgar Road. It then forms a protected bi directional lane formed by wands. This continues on the north side of the road to the west of the Angerstein Roundabout, where it becomes shared space and crosses the middle of the roundabout using new toucan crossings. It then continues as a bidirectional lane to the Angerstein Wharf railway bridge, where it ends awaiting an extension to Charlton.
