= National Cycle Route 2 =

Cycle route in the United Kingdom

- Length: 581 km (361 mi)
- Trailheads: Dover (east); St Austell (west)
- Waymark
- Website: www.sustrans.org.uk/find-a-route-on-the-national-cycle-network/route-2/

Route map
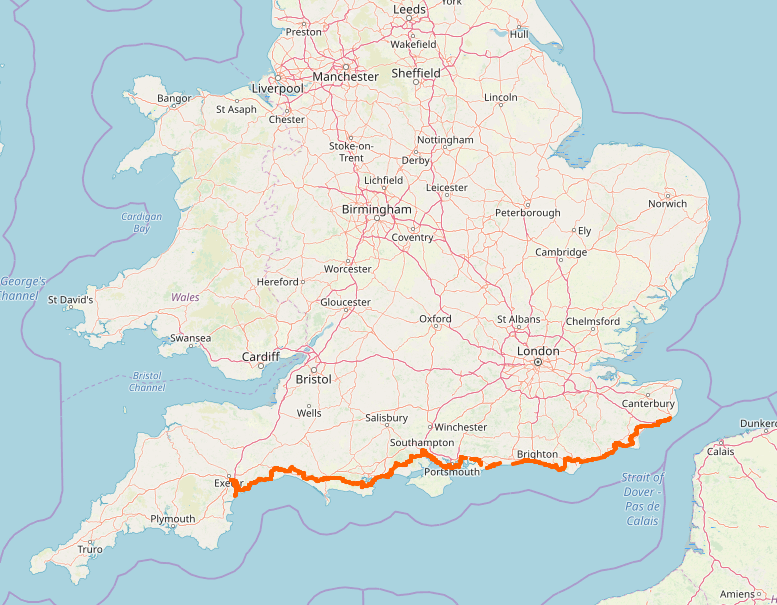
- National Cycle Route 2

National Cycle Route 2 (or NCR 2) is a route of the United Kingdom National Cycle Network, running from Dover to St Austell. When complete, the route will be 581 km (361 miles) long.

== Route ==
The route has several sections.

1. Dover to Hastings. The route follows the Chalk and Channel Way along the cliff tops to Folkestone and crosses Romney Marsh to Lydd. From Rye it follows the coast into Hastings.
2. Hastings to Brighton. The route runs along the coast to Pevensey and then inland to Seaford where it continues along the coast to Brighton.
3. Brighton to Worthing. The route runs along the coast via Shoreham-by-Sea.
4. Worthing to South Mundham. Only the section from Littlehampton and Bognor Regis is complete.
5. South Mundham to Christchurch. The route runs via Chichester to Havant and then down Hayling Island. The Hayling Ferry from the island to Eastney, Portsmouth, re-opened in August 2016 under new owners resolving a break in the route since March 2015. Portsmouth Harbour is crossed by the Gosport Ferry and the route continues to Warsash where it takes the Pink Ferry to Hamble-le-Rice and onto Southampton. From Town Quay the Hythe Ferry crosses for the cycleway on Hythe Pier and the route continues via Brockenhurst in the New Forest to Christchurch.
6. Christchurch to Lyme Regis. The route goes along the sea front at Bournemouth and across the ferry at Poole Harbour. It continues via Dorchester to Raymond's Hill a few miles north of Lyme Regis.
7. Axminster to Dawlish. The route is complete passing through Seaton, Sidmouth, Exmouth and around the Exe Estuary via Exeter. A new bridge over the Exeter to Plymouth railway line was constructed near Kenton.
8. Dawlish to Plymouth. There is still a gap of over 30km between Dawlish and Totnes as of 2023. The route is open from Totnes to Plymouth.
9. Plymouth to St. Austell. The route will take the Cremyll Ferry across the Plymouth Sound. Only a short section between Par and St Austell is currently open.
