= Avenue Verte =

Cycling route between Paris and London

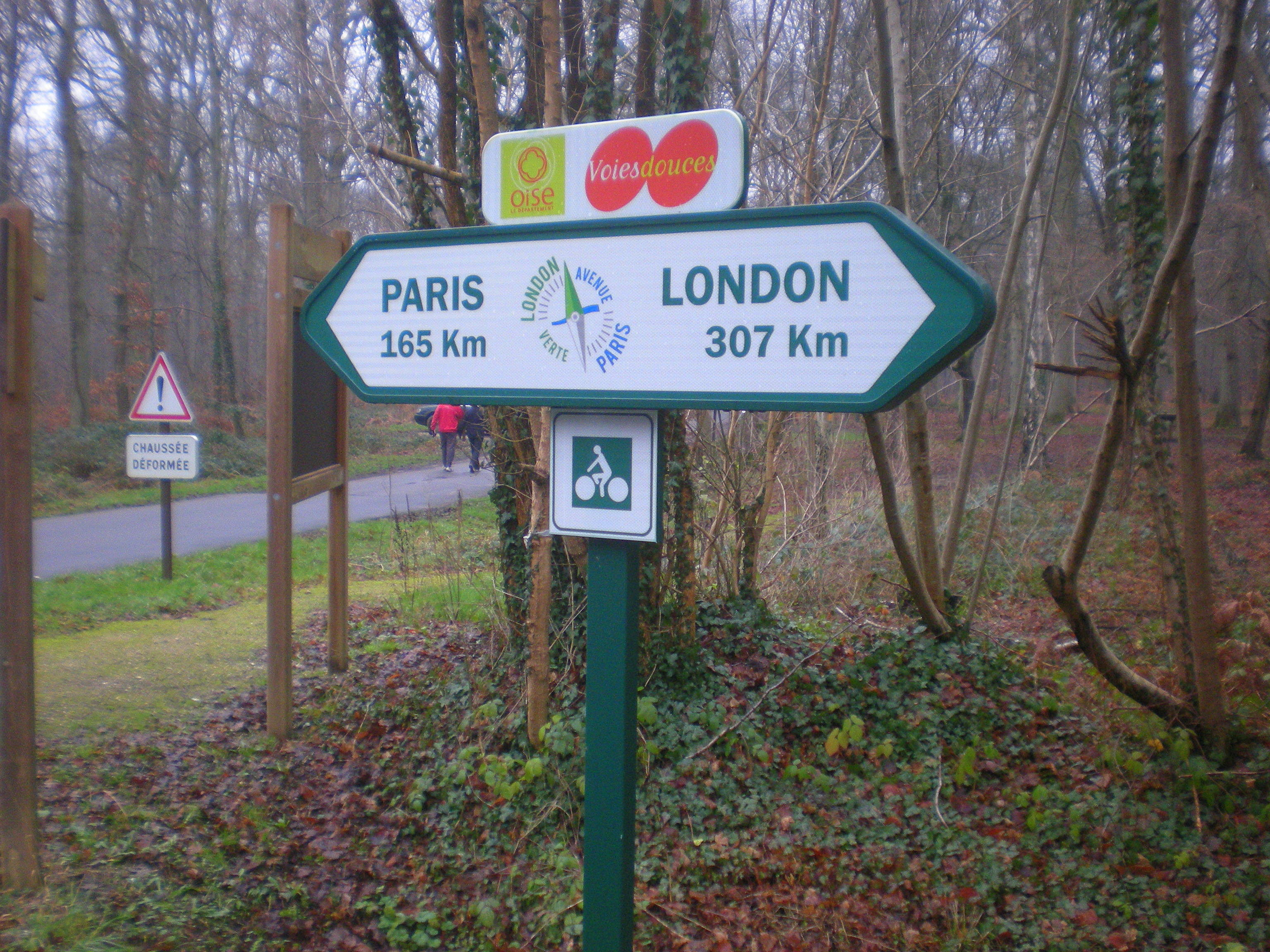
Avenue Verte sign in La Neuville-en-Hez

The Avenue Verte or Greenway is a joint initiative by the cities of Paris and London, to develop a predominantly traffic-free route between the two (via the Dieppe – Newhaven ferry) for cyclists, walkers and horse riders. The route was put in place in time for the 2012 London Olympic Games and forges a symbolic and physical connection between the two capital cities.

== England ==
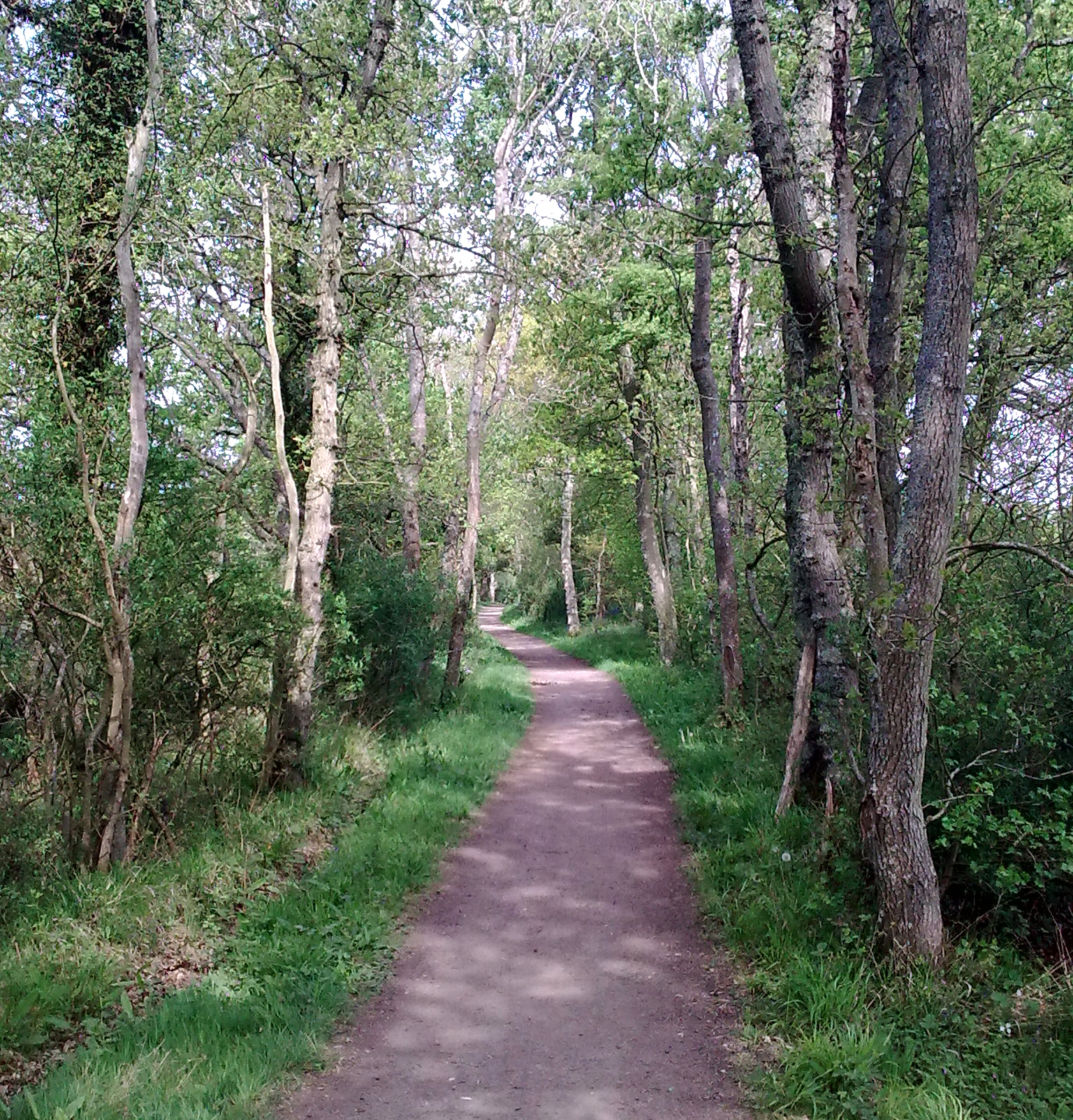
Section of NCN Route 21 north of Heathfield

In England, the current route begins at the London Eye and traverses several miles of urban sprawl, including a crossing over Gatwick Airport. It features the recently upgraded Wandle Trail near Morden Hall Park, before tackling the North Downs and High Weald. Along the way, the route includes forest paths and off-road rail trails.

The majority of the route on the English side is unpaved and in parts in so poor condition that it is not suitable for roadbikes, instead a hybrid, touring bike or a gravel bike, all with wider tires would be most suited.

Much of the English route was created when the National Cycle Network was founded for the millennium and the route has not been updated since due to lack of funding.

== France ==
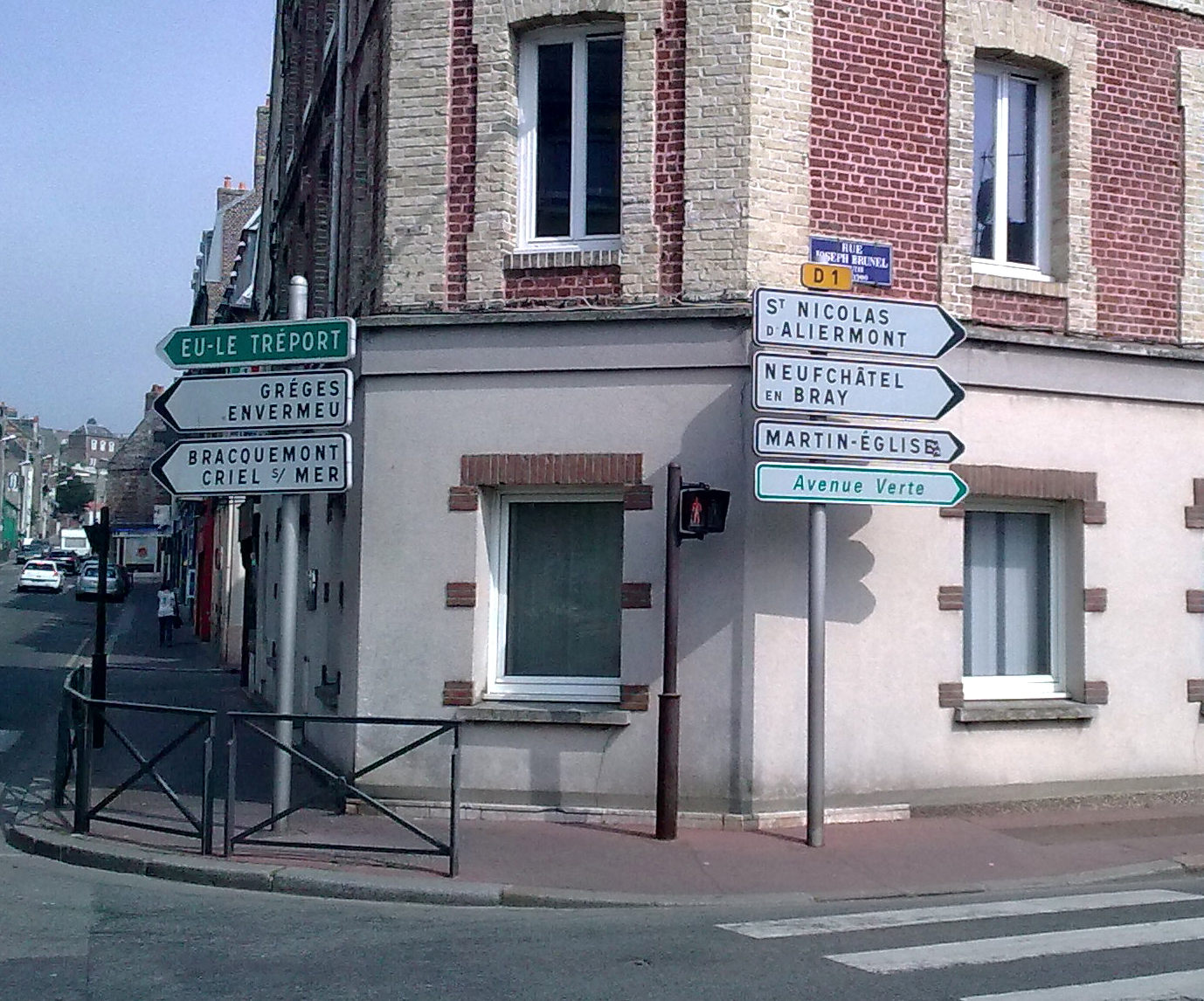
Sign in Dieppe town centre marking the D1 and Avenue Verte start

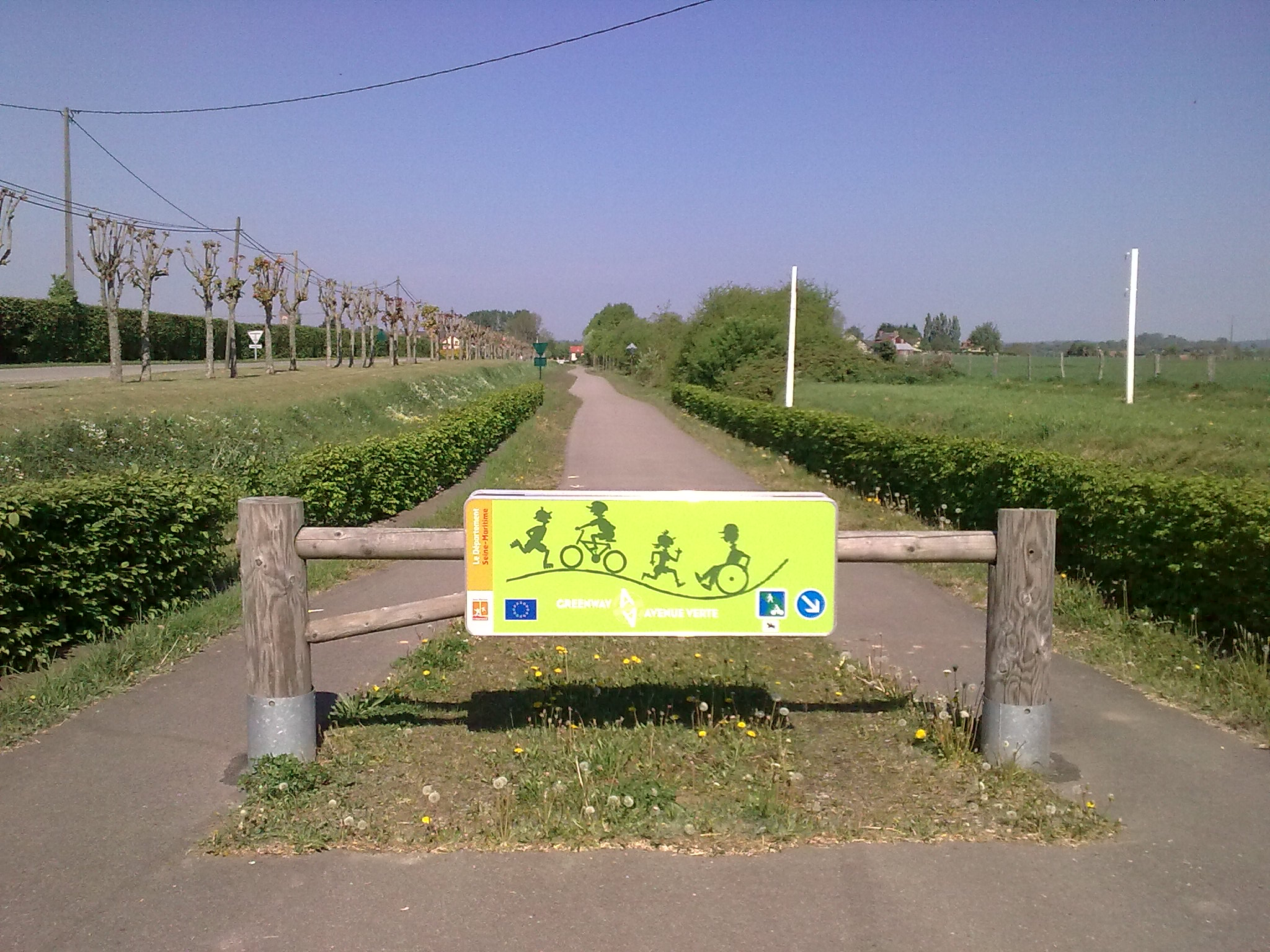
Section of Avenue Verte running from Dieppe to Forges-les-Eaux

There is a choice of ways to get to Paris. The route is one of the first structured cycling tourism routes in France.

On the French side of the route is considered nicer and many businesses such as cafes and restaurants have appeared on the route.
