= National Cycle Route 165 =

Cycle route in England

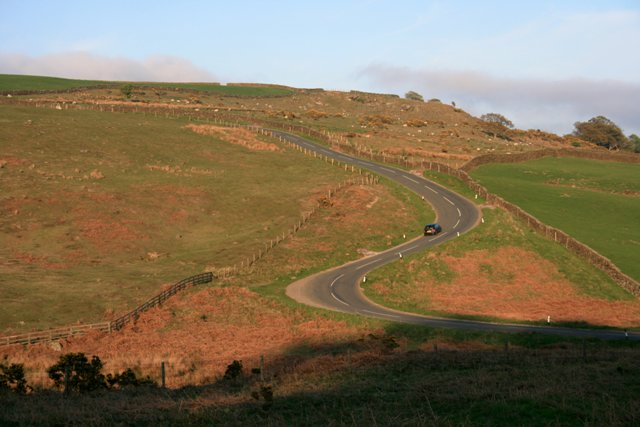
- Route 165 near Commondale in the North York Moors

part of the W2W Cycle Route
- Length: 116 km (72 mi)
- Location: County Durham; North Yorkshire
- Established: 2007 (as Regional Route 52)
- Designation: UK National Cycle Network
- Trailheads: Barnard Castle (west) to Whitby (east)
- Use: Cycling
- Highest point: Commondale, 247 m (810 ft)
- Lowest point: Ruswarp, 5 m (16 ft)
- Difficulty: Moderate
- Waymark: 165
- Website: www.sustrans.org.uk/find-a-route-on-the-national-cycle-network/route-165/

National Cycle Network (NCN) Route 165 is a Sustrans National Route that runs from Barnard Castle to Whitby. The route is 116 km (72 miles) long and is fully open and signed in both directions.

== History ==
The W2W was launched on 1 June 2005 as a cross-country cycle route from Walney Island in Cumbria to Sunderland on the River Wear . In 2007 a southern branch from Barnard Castle to Whitby was added. This southern branch was originally classified as regional route 52, it was upgraded to National Cycle Network Route 165 in 2012. The Walney to Whitby route is 179 miles (288 km).

== Route ==
The western trailhead is in Barnard Castle at a junction with Route 70. The route descends off the Durham Dales along the lower Tees Valley for 20 miles (32 km) to Croft-on-Tees near Darlington. Continuing on flat roads for 27 miles (43 km) until it reaches the North York Moors at Great Ayton. Following the Eskdale for the final 27 miles (43 km) the route crosses the River Esk four times before reaching its eastern trailhead at a junction with Route 1 on the outskirts of Whitby. This section includes several steep climbs and descents, some of them are on off-road tracks.

== Related NCN routes ==
Route 165 is part of the W2W route along with:

- 70
- 14
- 715
- 68
- 65
- 1

Route 165 meets the following routes:

- 70 at Barnard Castle
- 715 at Whorlton
- 65 at Hutton Rudby
- 168 at Kildale
- 1 at Whitby
