= Aldin Grange for Bearpark railway station =

Disused railway station in Bearpark, County Durham

Coordinates: 54.782°N 1.621°W

Aldin Grange for Bearpark
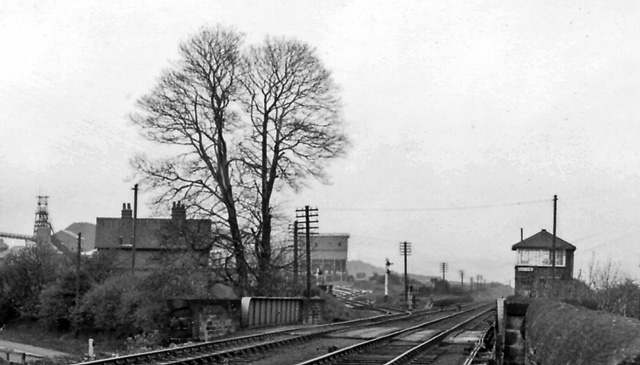
- Aldin Grange for Bearpark railway station in 1965

General information
- Location: Bearpark, County Durham; England

Other information
- Status: Disused

History
- Original company: North Eastern Railway
- Pre-grouping: North Eastern Railway
- Post-grouping: London and North Eastern Railway

Key dates
- May 1883: Station opens as Aldin Grange
- 19 June 1884: Station renamed Aldin Grange for Bearpark
- 1 May 1927: Station renamed Bearpark
- 1 May 1939: Station closes to regular traffic
- 26 April 1954: Last Miners' Gala excursion
- 1966: Closure to goods
Location

Aldin Grange for Bearpark railway station was located on the Lanchester Valley Railway that operated in County Durham, England. The railway station opened in 1883 as Aldin Grange, and was renamed Aldin Grange for Bearpark about a year later. In 1927 its name was changed to Bearpark. The station closed to passengers in 1939, although miners' gala excursions used the line until 1954, and freight then used the line until 1965.

== History ==
Opened as part of the North Eastern Railway, it became part of the London and North Eastern Railway during the Grouping of 1923, and that company withdrew regular passenger services in 1939. Occasional excursions to the Durham Miners Gala joined the goods and Bearpark Colliery traffic until the last gala excursion in 1954, after the line had passed to the Eastern Region of British Railways on nationalisation in 1948. Goods traffic continued until 1966 and the line was lifted in 1967.

== The Site Today ==
Today the site is a popular walk, the Lanchester Valley Railway Path. Nothing of the station remains.

Preceding station	Disused railways	Following station
Durham	London and North Eastern Railway; Lanchester Valley Railway	Witton Gilbert
