= Witton Gilbert railway station =

Disused railway station in Langley Park, County Durham

Witton Gilbert

General information
- Location: Langley Park, County Durham; England
- Coordinates: 54.8021°N 1.6609°W
- Grid reference: NZ219453
- Platforms: 1

Other information
- Status: Disused

History
- Original company: North Eastern Railway
- Post-grouping: LNER; British Rail (North Eastern)

Key dates
- 1 September 1862: Opened
- 1 May 1939: Closed to passengers
- 30 September 1963: Closed completely
Location

Witton Gilbert railway station served the village of Witton Gilbert, County Durham, England from 1862 to 1963 on the Lanchester Valley Line.

== History ==
The station opened on 1 September 1862 by the North Eastern Railway. The station was situated on the west side of a track running south from Wallnook Lane. This station's track was not doubled by the NER, possibly due to there being a low demand for collieries. Like all of the other stations on the line, the station closed to passengers on 1 May 1939. The property is now owned by Ross and Lee Jameson-Laffey Like the other stations, the station was still used for Miners' Gala until 17 July 1954. The station was closed to goods traffic on 30 July 1963.

Preceding station	Disused railways	Following station
Lanchester; Line and station closed	North Eastern Railway; Lanchester Valley Line	Aldin Grange for Bearpark; Line and station closed
