= Lanchester Valley Railway =

Former railway line in County Durham, England

North-eastern Railway Company's (Lanchester Valley Branch) Act 1857
- Act of Parliament
- Parliament of the United Kingdom
- Long title: An Act to enable the North-eastern Railway Company to make a Branch from their Bishop Auckland Branch Railway to the Conside Ironworks, to acquire additional Lands; and for other Purposes.
- Citation: 20 & 21 Vict. c. xlvi

Dates
- Royal assent: 13 July 1857

Text of statute as originally enacted

The Lanchester Valley Railway was a railway line developed by the North Eastern Railway to run between Durham and Consett, County Durham, England. Extending 12 miles (19 km) along the valley of the River Browney, it was opened on 1 September 1862. It was closed in 1966 and has since been redeveloped into a shared-use path.

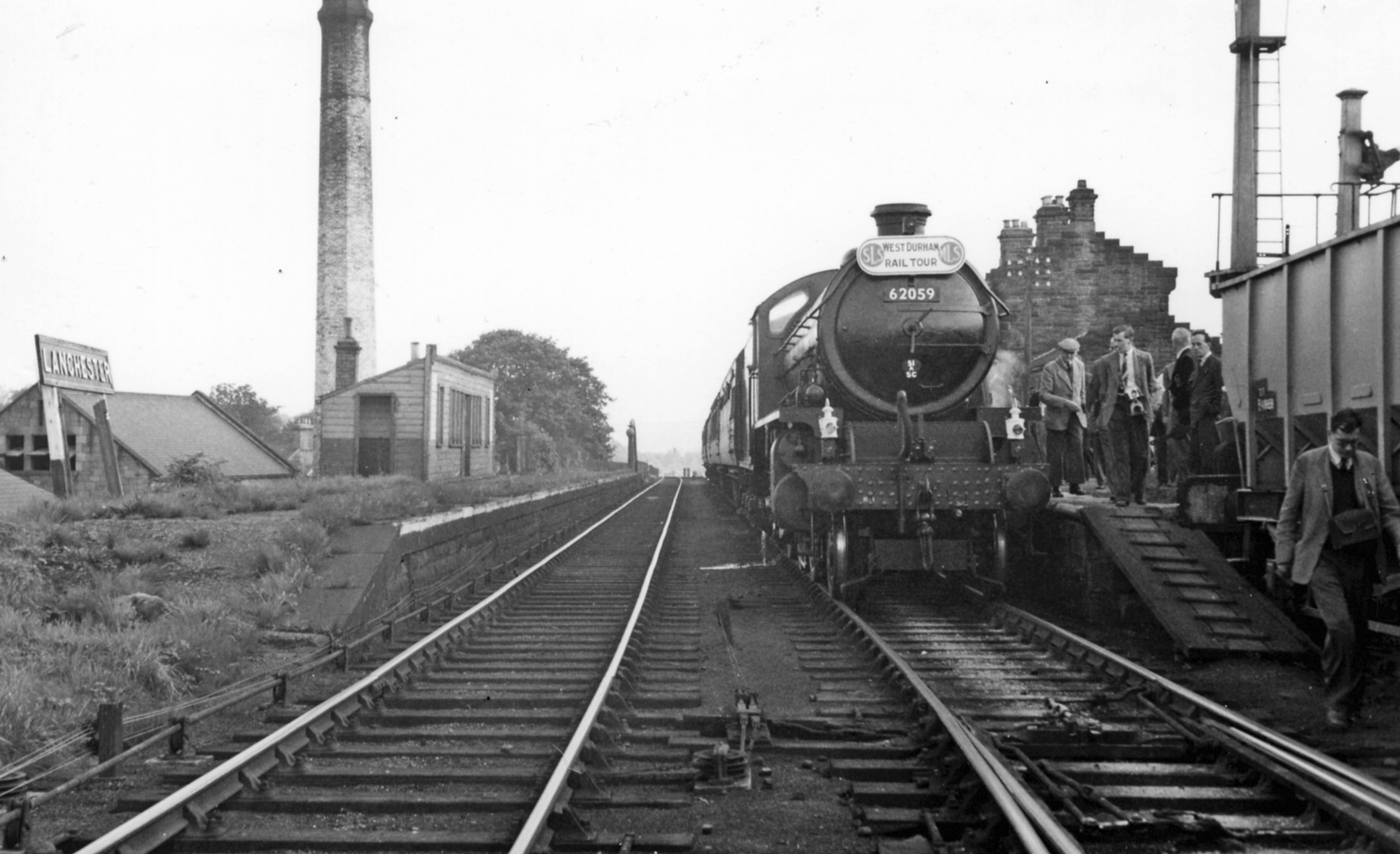
A train at Lanchester station in 1958

== Background ==
In 1842, the Derwent Iron Company (DIC) had taken over the southern part of the former Stanhope and Tyne Railway. After the West Durham Railway constructed a line to Crook, the Stockton and Darlington Railway (S&DR) began construction of the Weardale Extension Railway to Crook, which opened on 8 November 1843, from a junction on its leased Weardale Railway.

As a result, the DIC proposed an extension from Crook to the foot of the Meeting Slacks incline, which later became Waskerley, to provide a southern shipping route for their lime and iron products. Having obtained an extension of their right of way from the Bishop of Durham, the DIC submitted the plans to the S&DR, who agreed to the extension as long as the DIC leased the entire southern section of the former S&TR to them. The Stanhope to Carrhouse section passed into the possession of the S&DR on 1 January 1845, with the completed 10 miles (16 km) Weardale Extension Railway from the Wear Valley Junction to Waskerley opening on 16 May 1845.

After the opening of the Weardale Extension Railway and the completion of Hownes Gill Viaduct under Thomas Bouch in 1858, the DIC had pressured the newly-formed NER to link Consett with the River Tyne via Gateshead.

== Construction ==
After the North Eastern Railway (NER) was formed in 1854, they looked for commercially sound new projects within their territory. The proposed Derwent Valley Line would give great commercial value to the DIC, but its potential value to the NER was unknown.

The NER hence proposed a larger scale plan, to connect Durham to Gateshead and onwards to Newcastle Central via a second route. At this time, the NER had only the Leamside Line connecting the two major cities (there was no East Coast Main Line) and so a secondary line seemed promising. Furthermore, it was known that there was coal in the valley of the River Browney and so developing a railway through it would show speculators that relatively low-cost and reliable transport was easily available. Finally, by the 1860s, the DIC needed better access to the iron town of Middlesbrough and the neighbouring ironstone of the Cleveland Hills to feed its furnaces. At this time, they were accessed by various circuitous rail links between the two towns, but a direct route was required.

Construction commenced in February 1861 from Durham in the south, with all infrastructure built to double-track standards, but the line was initially built only as a single track. The line opened a year later, with stations at (North to South):

- Consett
- Knitsley
- Lanchester
- Witton Gilbert
- Durham

=== Bridges ===
The NER built a number of substantial stone bridges along the line to span the River Browney, but the largest was located 1.5 miles (2.4 km) east of Knitsley over Kitsley Burn. Needing to span a valley which was 700 feet (210 m) across, the railway chose a wooden structure, which when finished was a maximum of 70 feet (21 m) high. At the outbreak of World War I, the bridge was found to be in need of major repairs, and so under instruction from the Ministry of War and with assistance from the army, the NER replaced the structure with an embankment using colliery slag and old ballast.

== Operations ==
In 1870, Lord Lambton accepted an application to search for coal, and the following year it was found. After the agreement of suitable mineral rights leases, the NER in anticipation double-tracked the entire length of the line. Collieries subsequently opened at Bearpark, Malton, Lanchester and Langley Park; all were served by the railway.

Passenger numbers were always light on the line, mainly from coal miners taking early morning and late night works trains, and later from workers travelling to Consett. The expansion of the coal mines in the late Victoria era resulted in the additional opening of a station at Aldin Grange in 1883, which was renamed Bearpark in 1927.

The line became part of the London and North Eastern Railway during the Grouping of 1923. Passenger numbers fell as the various collieries closed, and the LNER ceased regular passenger services at the outbreak of World War II.

== Closure ==
Occasional excursions to the Durham Miners Gala continued until 1954, after the line had passed to the Eastern Region of British Railways on nationalisation in 1948. Goods traffic to the various stations continued until 1965, but the branch was closed under the Beeching Axe. Consett Steelworks traffic was diverted by British Railways via the former Stanhope and Tyne Railway, allowing the Lanchester Railway to close on 20 June 1966. Contractors removed the track the following year.

== Present ==
The route has been redeveloped by Durham County Council into the Lanchester Valley Railway Path, suitable for walking, cycling and horse riding. At the western end of the path, south of Consett, the route links with the Sea to Sea cycle route. The eastern end of the path at Broompark picnic area, near Stonebridge, meets up with the Walney to Wear route. There are many beautiful sites along its route, including the ruins of Beaurepaire at Bearpark.

== See also ==
- List of rail trails
