= Sea to Sea Cycle Route =

Cycling route in the UK

Sea to Sea Cycle Route (C2C)
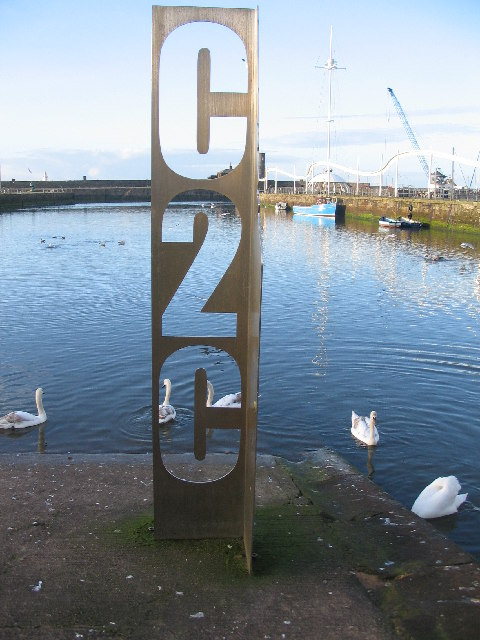
- Route marker at Whitehaven

part of National Cycle Route 7; part of National Cycle Route 14; part of National Cycle Route 71; part of National Cycle Route 72
- Length: 202 km (126 mi)–222 km (138 mi)
- Trailheads: Whitehaven or Workington (west); Tynemouth or Sunderland (east)
- Highest point: Black Hill (near Allenheads), 609 m (1,998 ft)
- Waymark: C2C
- Website: www.sustrans.org.uk/find-a-route-on-the-national-cycle-network/c2c-or-sea-to-sea/

The Coast to Coast or Sea to Sea Cycle Route (C2C) is a 140 miles (230 km) cycle route opened in 1994. Combining sections of National Cycle Route 7, 14, 71 and 72; it runs from Whitehaven or Workington on the west coast of Cumbria, and then crosses the Lake District and the Pennines in the north of England by using a variety of both on and off-road trails, ending on the north-east coast in Tyne and Wear at Sunderland or Tynemouth. Sustrans state that it is the UK's most popular challenge cycle route, it is designed for the whole range of cyclists, from families to cycling club riders. Although a challenge with some hard climbs—the highest point being over 609 m (1,998 ft)—the C2C is completed by an average of between 12,800 and 15,000 cyclists every year.

== History ==
The C2C is part of the UK National Cycle Network (NCN), and was developed by Sustrans in partnership with various local authorities, Groundwork West Cumbria, North Pennines Tourism Partnership, Forest Enterprise and the Lake District National Park amongst others. The route was opened in 1994 running from Whitehaven on the west coast of Cumbria to the north-east coast at Sunderland. A northern branch splits off from the main route at Consett, following the route of the Derwent Walk, passing through Tyneside and ending at Tynemouth.

In 2005 a complementary route was opened further to the south. This, titled the Walney to Wear route (W2W), is designed to be slightly tougher and longer. It runs from Walney Island in south-west Cumbria to Sunderland via the North York Moors and Durham.

== Art ==
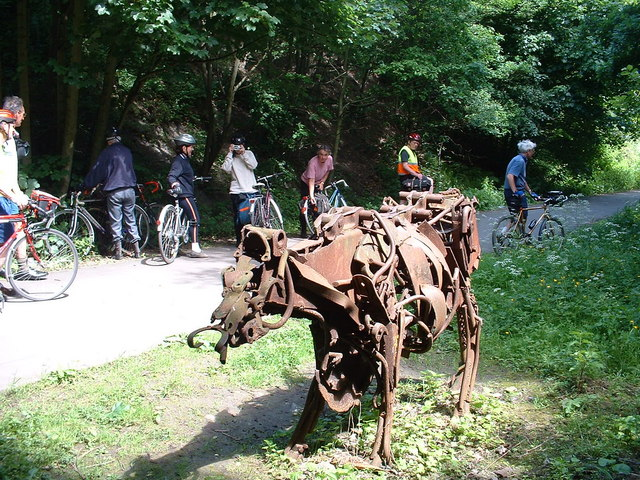
Roadside sculpture by Sally Matthews

A number of public artworks have been commissioned for the route, including Tony Cragg's Terris Novalis at Consett, sheepfolds by Andy Goldsworthy at various points in Cumbria and Alison Wilding's Ambit in the River Wear at Sunderland. Eduardo Chillida had been commissioned to create a work for Whitehaven, but the project has not been completed.

On the Consett to Sunderland line, there are The Old Transformers by David Kemp below Pontop Pike mast near Annfield Plain and four steel cows by Sally Matthews near Beamish Museum.

== Route ==
The route has two alternative start points in West Cumbria at Whitehaven and at Workington, before travelling through the stunning scenery of the western and northern Lake District. The Workington route runs via Cockermouth to Keswick, while the Whitehaven route runs via Loweswater to Keswick before passing through Penrith and the Eden Valley with its lush valleys and sandstone villages. It then starts the climb up to Hartside Pass and onto the Northern Pennines—the "roof of England". There then follows an undulating ride as the C2C meanders through old lead-mining villages, such as Garrigill, Nenthead and Rookhope, and down into the Durham Dales before crossing Waskerley Moor and entering the old steel town of Consett via the Hownes Gill Viaduct.

From Consett it's an easy ride via Leadgate, Annfield Plain, Stanley, Beamish and through one of Britain's old industrial heartlands to the North Sea and Sunderland. There is also the option of starting at Workington and/or finishing at Tynemouth and also a link route at Penrith to join up with the Glasgow to Carlisle section of the National Cycle Route. The route is made up of approximately:

- main roads—mainly short sections through urban areas—4%
- minor roads—quiet, country roads—50%
- cyclepaths/off-road—disused railway lines, etc.—46%

The C2C is easier if ridden from west to east to take advantage of the prevailing winds from the west and taking advantage of the gradients. Tradition is to start the ride by dipping the back wheel in the Irish Sea and ends when the front wheel gets a dip in the North Sea at the finish.

The floods of December 2015 destroyed or damaged some bridges on the C2C route through Cumbria, and there is quite often forestry work which closes some off-road sections, but alternative routes are signposted and are generally shown on the C2C-cycle website.

It is typically completed in 3–5 days, though it has been completed in a single day. The record is currently held by Joel Toombs and Matt Shorrock at 7:53:03 west to east on 28 September 2012. The youngest person to complete the C2C in one day is Christian Webster-Reed, aged 15, who completed the C2C in a moving time of 8:56:04 and an overall time of 13:56:24 on 25 August 2013.

The youngest person to complete the C2C2C in one day, from Tynemouth to Silloth and then back to Tynemouth again, is Hal Kennedy aged 17; completing the route in a moving time of 11:27:15 and an overall time of 14:28:02 on 8 May 2022.

In September 2021, Johan Lempen and Harvey Logan became the first people to complete the route on children's scooters.

On 13 September 2026, a group ran from Bowness on Solway to North Shields, along the Hadrian's Wall path and Route 72, raising sponsorship for Golddigger Trust. They completed the 149k route in 16:30:55, starting at midnight. This is the fastest known time for a relay group to run from Coast to Coast. Nine runners each ran between 18km and 60km, supported by two vehicles. The group consisted of Sophie Cherry, Richard Elgar, Tim Elgar, Cara George, Mike Gilbert, Joel McKay-Smith, Matt Shorrock, Dave Stout, Jules Tilley, Andy Wooding-Jones and Margaret Wooding-Jones.

The route links to other parts of the NCN so can be used as part of a longer cycle tour.

Route maps for the C2C and detailed route guides from other publishers are available from Sustrans.

== See also ==
- Coast to Coast Walk—a similar long-distance footpath, which takes a different route between the two coastlines.
