= Witton Gilbert =

Village in County Durham, England

Coordinates: 54.808°N 1.635°W

- Location within County Durham
- Population: 2,419 (2011)
- OS grid reference: NZ235459
- Unitary authority: County Durham
- Ceremonial county: Durham
- Region: North East
- Country: England
- Sovereign state: United Kingdom
- Post town: DURHAM
- Postcode district: DH7
- Dialling code: 0191
- Police: Durham
- Fire: County Durham and Darlington
- Ambulance: North East
- UK Parliament: City of Durham

Witton Gilbert /ˈdʒɪlbərt/ is a village and civil parish in County Durham, England.

== Geography ==
Witton Gilbert is situated about 3.7 miles (6.0 km) to the north-west of Durham. River Browney passes to the south of the village, while Dene Burn, one of its tributaries, runs through it. Parts of the Prior of Durham's Park of Beaurepaire are within the bounds of Witton Gilbert.

The village once had a railway station on the Lanchester Valley Line, but this was closed in the early 1960s, with passenger service withdrawn in the late 1930s. However, the station building survives as a private residence, along with one of the platforms. The former railway line has been turned into a foot and cycle path and is part of National Cycle Route 14.

== History ==
There is archaeological evidence of the area having been populated in the late Neolithic and in the Bronze Age periods. A small Roman settlement at Crookton across the River Browney existed as a settlement until the 13th century.

Witton Gilbert is a medieval town of Saxon origin. Witton was originally spelled Witun (Wit meaning white house and Tun meaning fortified place). The designation "Gilbert" was added later and could refer to the Norman lord Gilbert de la Ley, a major landowner in the 12th century, or a later lord Gilbert de la Latone. In medieval times Witton Gilbert was very important to the churchmen of Durham and became the place of a retreat or residence of the latter. Other occasional occupants included visiting royalty such as King Edward III and Queen Philippa and also King Edward I.

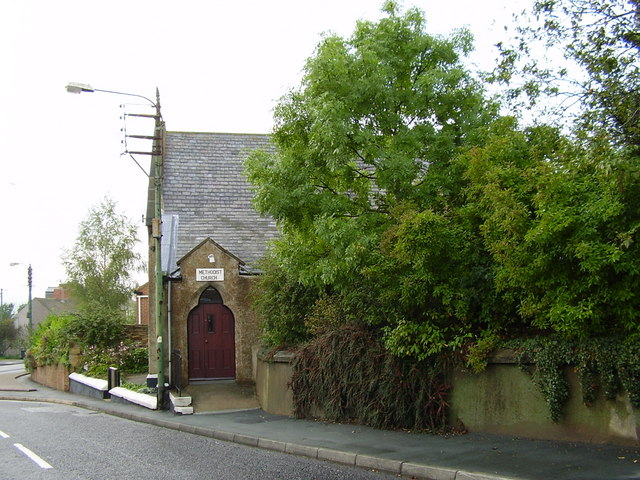
Methodist Chapel

In the early 14th century, coal mining started in the parish from bell pits, however, the deposits were soon worked out. The first school in the village is known from the 1660s, a schoolhouse was built on Front Street in 1720. In 1875, the Wesleyan Methodist Chapel was built. From 1894 to 1937 Witton Gilbert and neighbouring Sacriston formed a joint civil parish. Nearby collieries employed numerous workers, many of whom settled in Witton Gilbert, so that the population reportedly increased to about 4,400 people in 1896. Coal was again extracted in a small drift mine from after World War I until shortly after the nationalisation of the coal industry. Some of England's first council houses were built at the beginning of the 20th century, further housing estates were constructed in the 1960s and 1970s. A road bypass to the south of the village was opened in 1996.

== Beaurepaire Priory ==
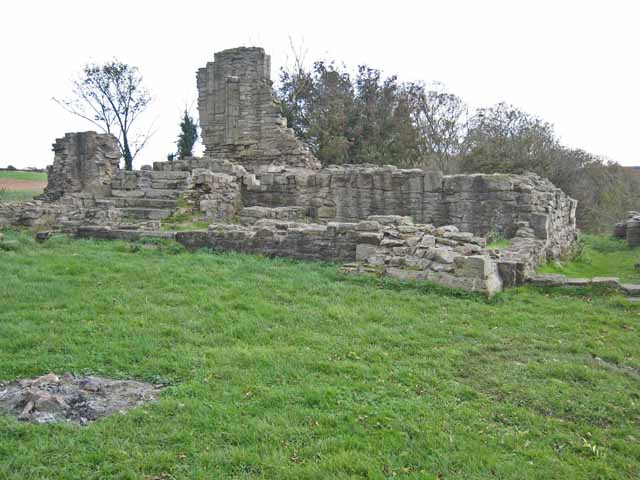
Ruins of Beaurepaire Prior's House

The manor house of Beau Repaire (French for 'beautiful retreat') was built near Witton Gilbert in the mid-13th century and became a retreat for the priors and monks of Durham Cathedral. The name was later corrupted to Bearpark, which is also the name of the village south of Witton Gilbert. During the following centuries the mansion fell in and out of repair. After Henry VIII's Dissolution of the Monasteries it was still occasionally used by the deans of Durham, but during the English Civil War it suffered major damage by Scottish troops. Since then, it has fallen into ruin, although it attracted antiquarian attention. Beaurepaire was the centre of a large hunting park. Tenants built walls to keep the game off the fields.

== Leper Hospital ==
Around 1175, Gilbert de la Ley, Lord of the Manor and tenant of the Bishop of Durham, financed the building of a leper hospital. The hospital originally took in five lepers, their number later increased to eight. Wealthy lords often funded hospitals for the lepers out of Christian concern for their suffering and as an act of piety. The hospital had its own chapel for worship and continued to operate until the dissolution of the monasteries when the inmates were dispersed to fend for themselves. Afterwards, the hospital was converted to a farmhouse and is still in use. A medieval window frame carved out of stone can still be seen from Coach Lane, and the original entrance is now a doorway inside.

== St. Michael and all Angels parish church ==
Hugh Pudsey, Bishop of Durham in the late 12th century, felt the need for a church in Witton because St. Oswalds in Durham was too far away. The church was built around 1175 AD and still retains some of its medieval features. It was later extended so that it offered room for about 70 people. Originally priests travelled to Witton church once a fortnight to hold services, however after the Reformation the church became independent and conducted its own services.

== Notable people ==
- The 1980s sophisti-pop band Prefab Sprout were based around Witton Gilbert.
