= Bay Cycle Way =

Cycle route around Morecambe Bay in NW England

NCN Route 700 / Bay Cycle Way
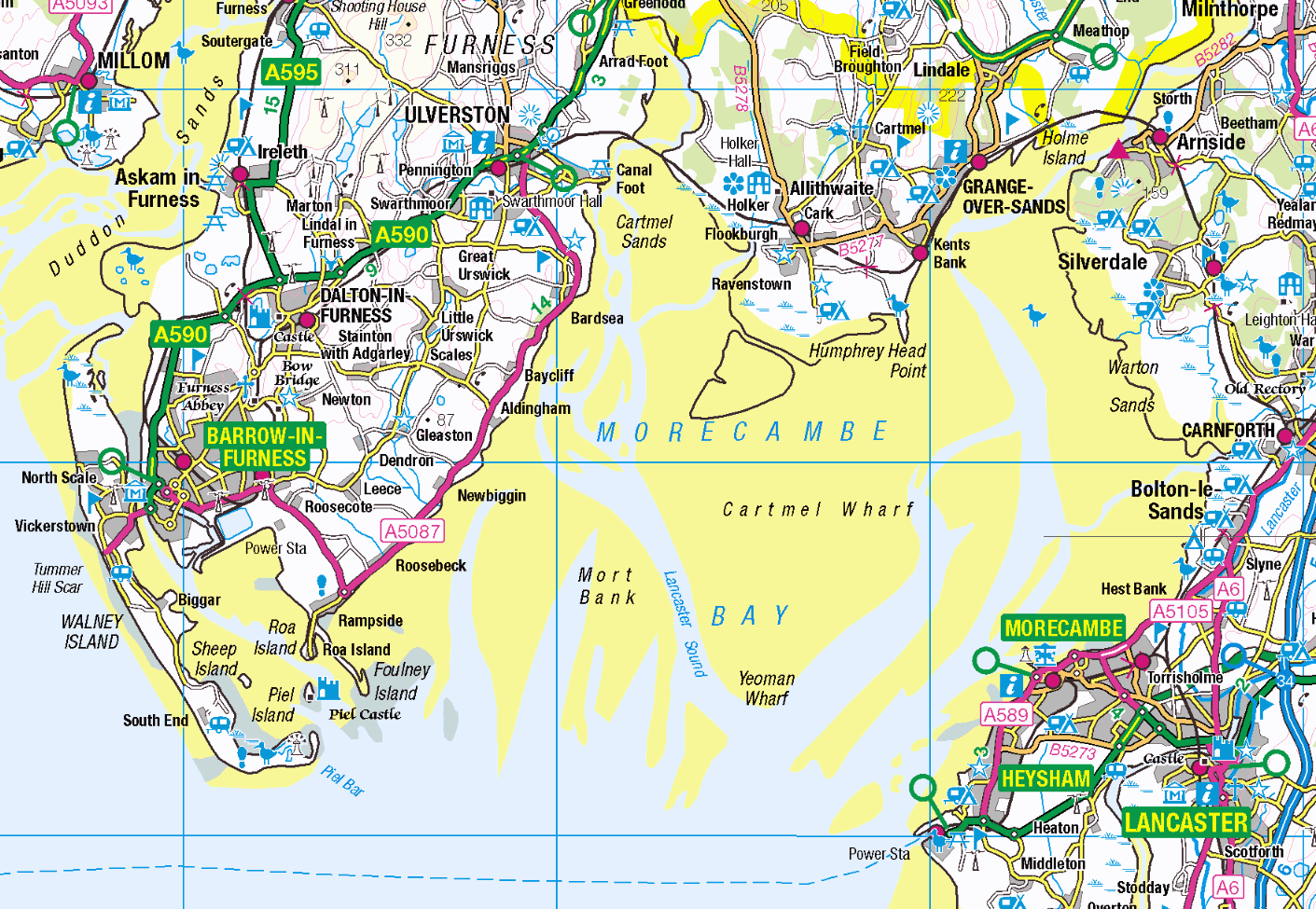
- Map of Morecambe Bay, showing almost all the route
- Length: 80 mi (130 km)
- Location: Morecambe Bay (Cumbria and Lancashire), England
- Established: 2015
- Designation: UK National Cycle Network
- Trailheads: Walney Island (west); 54°6′9″N 3°15′45″W; Glasson Dock (east); 53°59′53″N 2°50′48″W
- Use: Cycling
- Elevation change: 1777m
- Lowest point: start and finish, 0 m (0 ft)
- Waymark: 700
- Surface: 28.2% Traffic-free, 99.0% Asphalt
- Website: Sustrans route description

The Bay Cycle Way is an 80-mile (130 km) cycling route around Morecambe Bay in Lancashire and Cumbria in north west England. Most of it forms National Cycle Route 700 (NCN 700), while other sections are waymarked as NCN 6 (London to the Lake District), NCN 69 (Hest Bank to Cleethorpes) and NCN 70 (Walney to Sunderland).

It has been recommended by The Daily Telegraph ("20 amazing ways to enjoy the English seaside this summer"), the i newspaper ("20 best cycle routes in the UK: from coastal pathways to woodland rides") and the Touring Club Italiano ("Inghilterra, Scozia e Galles in bicicletta, le ciclabili più belle per una vacanza green").

== Route ==
The end points of the route are Walney Island, west of Barrow-in-Furness, and Glasson Dock, a former port on the River Lune south west of Lancaster. The route goes inland to Milnthorpe to cross the River Kent at Levens Bridge, near Levens Hall, the lowest crossing point of the river by road; there are hopes that a footpath and cycleway may some time be installed alongside the railway viaduct which crosses the river at Arnside, further downstream. 99.0% of the road is on asphalt roads or paths, and 28.2% is on traffic-free paths. The route ascends to 170 metres (560 ft) between Grenodd and Cartmel, and goes above 100 metres (330 ft) in three sections. There are said to be three "challenging climbs": leaving Ulverston, ascending Bigland Hill (between Bigland Tarn and Bigland Barrow, north of Cartmel) and Warton Crag. The total ascent has been calculated to be 1,777 metres (5,830 ft). Sustrans estimates total cycling time as 6 h 46 min at an average pace of 12 miles per hour (19 km/h), while the Morecambe Bay Partnership suggests a four-day itinerary.

The route passes through:

Places on the Bay Cycle Way
- Walney Island
- Barrow-in-Furness
- Rampside
- Roosebeck (8 miles (13 km))
- Ulverston (19 miles (31 km))
- Greenodd
- Cartmel
- Cark
- Flookburgh
- Grange-over-Sands (37 miles (60 km))
- River Kent crossing at Levens Bridge
- Arnside (53 miles (85 km))
- Silverdale
- Carnforth (outskirts) (62 miles (100 km))
- Hest Bank
- Morecambe (70 miles (110 km))
- Lancaster (73 miles (117 km))
- Glasson Dock (80 miles (130 km))
