= National Cycle Route 70 =

Cycle route in the United Kingdom

National Cycle Network (NCN) Route 70 is a Sustrans National Route that runs from Walney Island in Cumbria to Sunderland. The route is fully open and signed. From end to end the route is 149 miles (240 km), but two sections are shared with other NCN routes leaving Route 70 at 128 miles (206 km).

== History ==
Route 70 is the original route of the W2W challenge route which was launched on 1 June 2005. When launched the route used sections of NCN Routes 72, 68 and 71 west of the Pennines. From Tan Hill to Sunderland a new Regional Route was created and given the number 20, with a blue background. In 2012, after improvements to meet National Cycle Network standards, it was upgrade to Route 70. Route signs were changed to the number 70 with a red background. Around the same time the sections on the route that had previously been Route 71 and 72 were re-signed as Route 70.

== Route ==
=== Walney to Oxenholme ===
The eastern section is 41 miles (66 km). From Walney Island in the Irish Sea (54.1026°N 3.2627°W) it goes on to the industrial port of Barrow-in-Furness. It then runs through the Furness peninsula, passing the towns of Ulverston and the picturesque Grange-Over-Sands where the route follows the Promenade. The route continues to skirt the Lake District national park to Oxenholme, with a short branch from there to the historical market town of Kendal

=== Oxenholme to Barnard Castle ===
The central section is 60 miles (97 km). On reaching the Lune Valley the route joins the Pennine Cycleway (Route 68) and is signed accordingly from there for the 17 miles (27 km) miles to Asby. After this, the path continues as Route 70 moving in an easterly direction towards Kirkby Stephen and through the Pennines to Barnard Castle in County Durham. The highest point on the route is at Tan Hill, 530 metres (1,740 ft).

=== Barnard Castle to Sunderland ===
The eastern section is 49 miles (79 km). Continuing through Hamsterley, to reach the cathedral city of Durham. Regional Route 715 between Barnard Castle and Willington is an alternative W2W route, it is 2 miles (3.2 km) shorter and an easier ride via Bishop Auckland. From Durham the route joins Route 14 for 6 miles (9.7 km) until Sherburn from where it continues is via Hetton Lyons Park to its eastern trailhead at Silksworth, Sunderland where it meets Route 1.

== Related NCN routes ==
Route 70 meets the following routes:

- Route 700 at Barrow in Furness, Ulverston, Cartmel, Grange-over-Sands and Levens
- Route 6 at Crosscrake and Natland
- Route 68 at Lowgill 54.36°N 2.57°W and Asby
- Route 71 at Tan Hill 54.46°N 2.11°W
- Route 165 at Barnard Castle
- Route 715 at Willington
- Route 14 at Durham and Sherburn
- Route 1 at Sunderland

Route 70 is part of the W2W along with:

- 165
- 14
- 715
- 68
- 65
- 1

Route 70 is part of the Bay Cycle Way along with:

- 700
- 6
- 69
