= National Cycle Route 141 =

Cycle route along the River Tyne, England

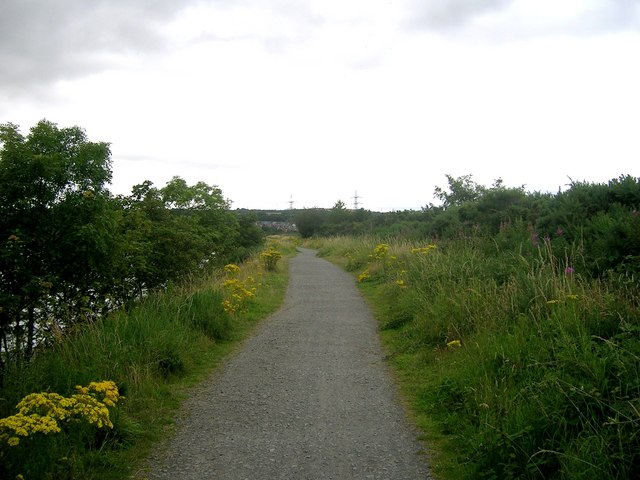

Part of Keelman's Way
- Length: 11.2 km (7.0 mi)
- Location: Gateshead
- Designation: UK National Cycle Network
- Trailheads: Wylam 72; 54.9767°N 1.8171°W; Swalwell 14; 54.9633°N 1.68041°W
- Use: Cycling; Pedestrians
- Waymark: 141
- Website: www.sustrans.org.uk/find-a-route-on-the-national-cycle-network/route-141/

Trail map
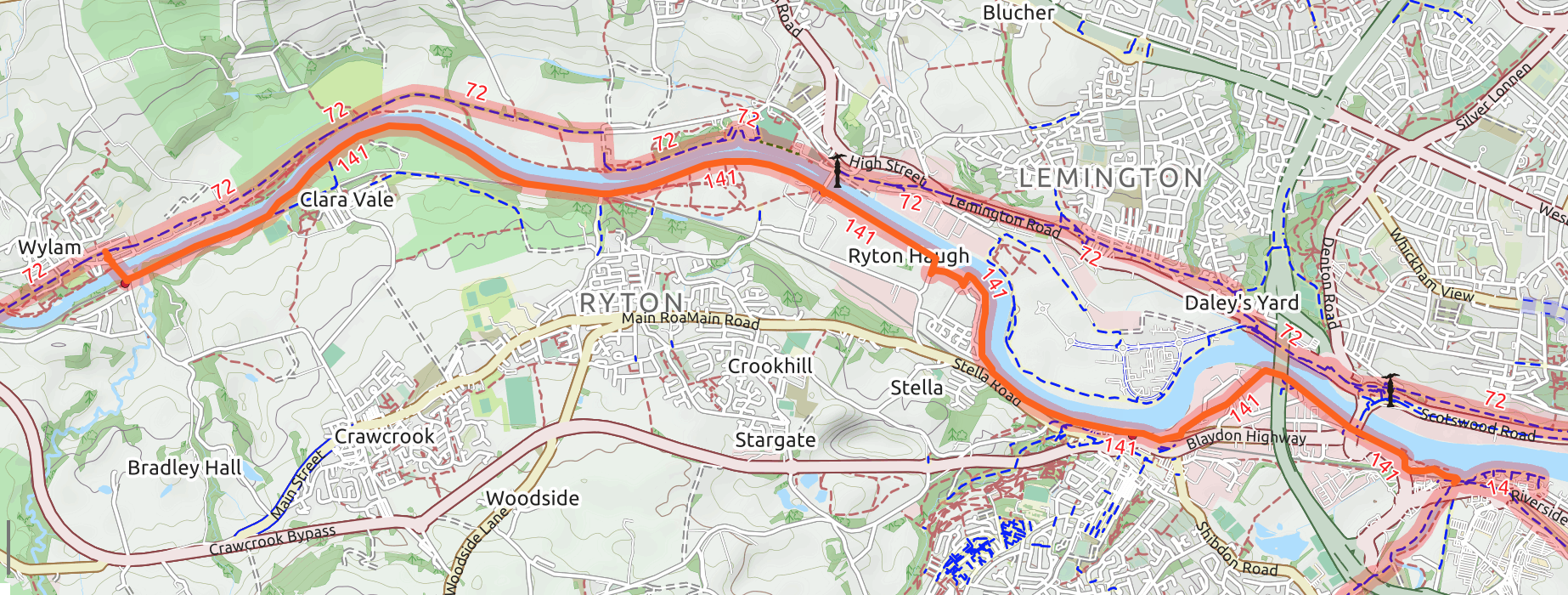
- Map of National Cycle Route 141

National Cycle Network (NCN) Route 141 is a Sustrans Regional Route. It is 11.2 km (7.0 mi) long. It provides a connection between Route 14 and Route 72 along the south bank of the River Tyne through Gateshead. The full length of the route is signposted and is part of the Keelmans Way.

== Route ==
NCN 141 starts at National Cycle Route 72, in Wylam on the north bank of the River Tyne. It crosses the river on Wylam Bridge before heading east off-road along the south bank of the Tyne. It passes Tyneside Golf Club, Ryton Willows and Blaydon before reaching its eastern trailhead at Derwenthaugh (in Swalwell) where it meets National Cycle Route 14.

The eastern end of the route was opened in 2012 so cyclists could avoid having to cross the busy Newburn Bridge to reach route 72. There are public artworks as the route passes the site of the Blaydon racecourse.

== 2021 Closure ==
The route was closed between Wylam and Clara Vale due to a landslip in February 2021. It reopened in March 2023.

== Related NCN Routes ==
Route 141 meets the following routes:

- National Cycle Route 72, National Cycle Route 14

Route 141 is part of the Keelmans Way along with Route 14
