= Knitsley =

Coordinates: 54°50′N 1°49′W

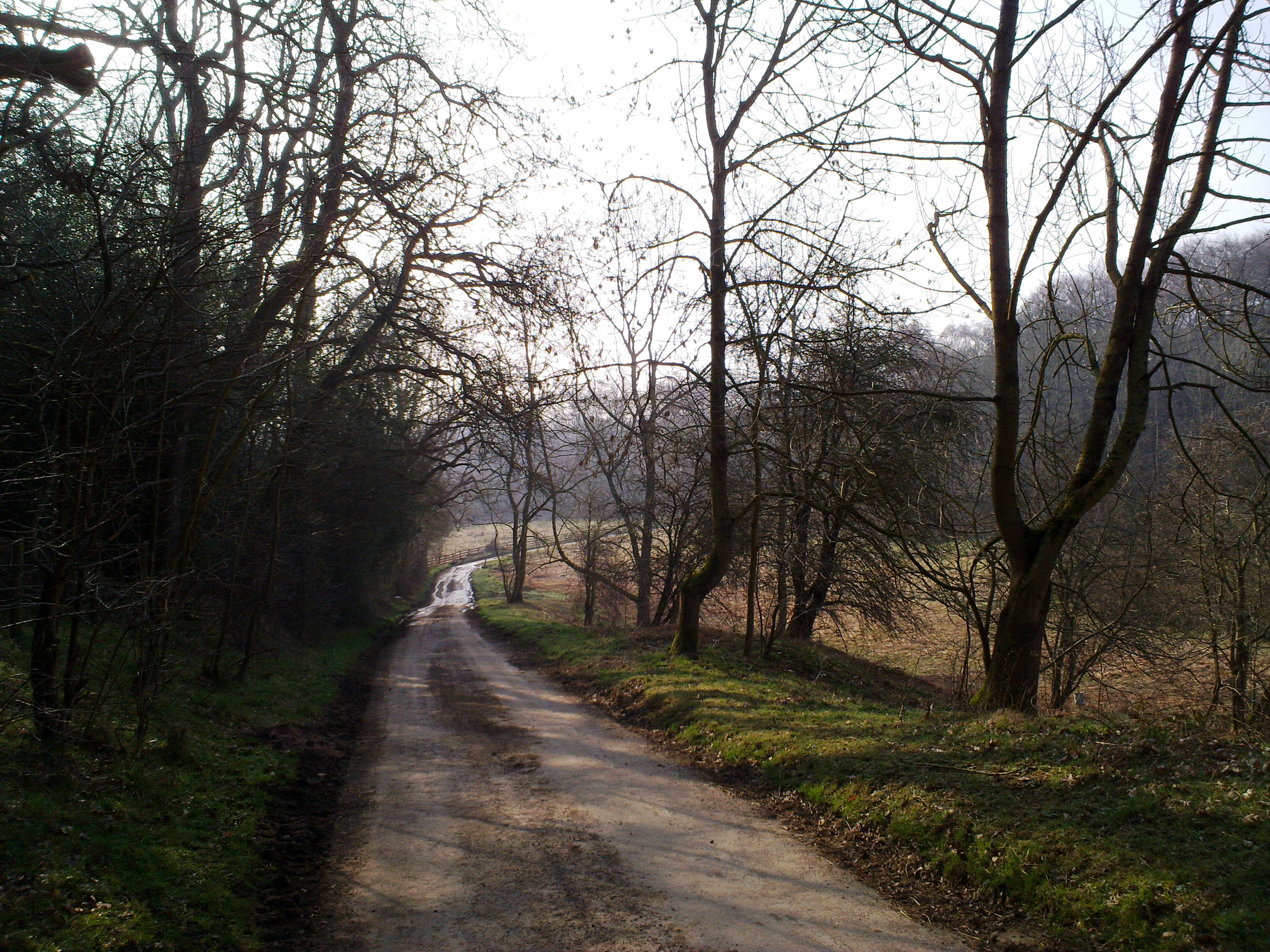

- Location within County Durham
- Civil parish: Healeyfield
- Unitary authority: County Durham
- Ceremonial county: Durham
- Region: North East
- Country: England
- Sovereign state: United Kingdom
- Police: Durham
- Fire: County Durham and Darlington
- Ambulance: North East

Knitsley is a hamlet in the civil parish of Healeyfield, in the County Durham district, in the ceremonial county of Durham, England. It is situated a short distance to the south of the town of Consett.

The name derives from Old English and means the meadow where knights were//the knight's field/knight's clearing.

Knitsley is mentioned in a charter of c. 1250 in which Adam of Knychley held lands near Iveston. Further charters of 1280 list Hugh of Cnicheley and William of Knicheley, the latter a witness for John de Chilton of Healyfield. In Bishop Hatfield's Survey (1381), Robert of Kellawe held the vill of Knycheley. The lands passed through various holders including, the Surtees, Eure and Claxton families, the latter holding the manor until the 1620s. In the 1800s the land was owned by the earls of Coventry until it was sold to tenants in 1920.

With the Inclosure Act 1773 (13 Geo. 3. c. 81) the common lands of Knitsley were enclosed and sold off.

The landscape gardener and arboriculturalist, Thomas White (1736-1811), took advantage of the enclosure and sale of land purchasing over 200 acres. He planted a wide variety of trees, landscaped the gardens and built a house, Woodlands Hall, in 1779. With the death of Thomas White the younger in 1831 the house and estate passed through numerous families including John Richardson (died 1871) of Shotley Park. The estate was then bought by William Brewis Van Haansbergen, who lived there until his death in 1921.

There was a Primitive Methodist meeting house (listed as Salem Chapel on the 1857 Ordnance Survey map) established in 1842. It seems to have been demolished in the 1950s.

There is a pub (some way outside of the village) called The Old Mill. A telephone box once existed at the end of Hownsgill drive but this was removed many years ago due to lack of use.

The railway station serving the North Eastern Railway was opened in 1862. It existed until 1964 when cutbacks in the railway system dramatically reduced rail services in Britain. The old railway line is now part of the Lanchester Valley Railway Path.

== Civil parish ==
Knitsley was formerly in Conside-cum-Knitsley township, in the parish of Lanchester, from 1894 Knitsley was a civil parish in its own right. In 1931 the parish had a population of 2276. On 1 April 1937, the parish was abolished and merged with Healeyfield and Consett.
