= Shotley Park =

Building in Shotley Bridge, County Durham, England

Coordinates: 54°52′29.755″N 1°51′19.544″W

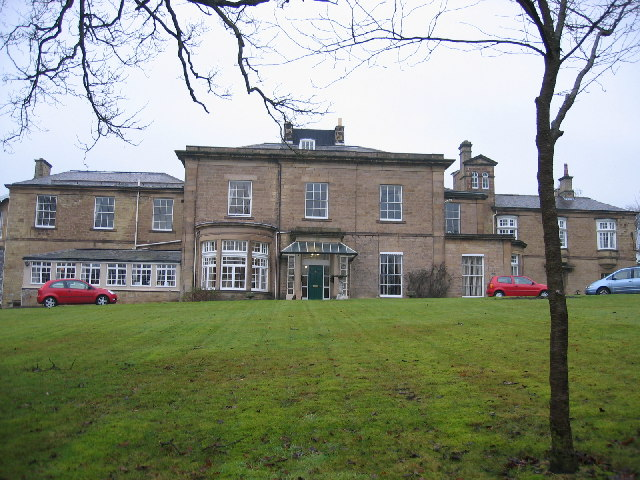
Shotley Park House in 2006.

Shotley Park is a former stately home and estate near the town of Shotley Bridge in County Durham, England. It is a listed building with grade II.

The house was built by Jonathan Richardson (1802–1871), the founder of Shotley Bridge Spa, the driving force in the town’s rapid growth in the mid 19th century. Richardson was also heavily involved in the Derwent Iron Company (later the Consett Iron Company). With the demise of the Derwent Iron Company and financial crisis, Richardson moved to Woodlands Hall (near Knitsley).

The Richardson family sold Shotley Park to the Priestman family in 1880 (following the death of Jonathan Richardson on Christmas Day 1871). The Priestmans, who were coal owners, added major extensions to the house. Following wartime use as a nursing home during WW2 and the Priestmans moving to Slaley Hall the main property fell into institutional use before being gifted to Barnardo's in 1947, who ran it as a children’s home until 1984. In the late 1980s Shotley Park was turned into a residential care home for the elderly, which closed for financial reasons in 2023.

In 2024 it was bought by a developer who had plans approved to turn it into a hotel; however on the night of 5 October 2025 a large fire burned through the building (the fire is being treated as a suspected arson).
