= Knitsley railway station =

Disused railway station in Knitsley, County Durham

Knitsley

General information
- Location: Knitsley, County Durham; England
- Coordinates: 54.8331°N 1.8125°W
- Grid reference: NZ121487
- Platforms: 2

Other information
- Status: Disused

History
- Original company: Lanchester Valley Railway
- Pre-grouping: North Eastern Railway
- Post-grouping: London and North Eastern Railway

Key dates
- 1 September 1862: Opened
- 1 February 1916: Closed to passengers
- 30 March 1925: Reopened
- 1 May 1939: Closed to passengers
- 9 March 1964: Closed completely
Location

Knitsley railway station served the hamlet of Knitsley, County Durham, England from 1862 to 1939 on the Lanchester Valley Railway.

== History ==
The station opened on 1 September 1862 by the North Eastern Railway. The station was situated on the west side of Butesfield Lane. In 1870 Lord Lambton, who owned the land at the time, accepted an application to search for coal and it was founded in the following year. The NER doubled the station's tracks in anticipation of the demand from collieries that may open on the line, and this did soon happen at Malton, Lanchester, Bearpark and Langley. The station closed to passengers on 1 February 1916 but later reopened on 30 March 1925. Passenger numbers were always light on the Lanchester Valley Line and it had an early close on 1 May 1939. After closure to passengers, there were still occasional excursions for Miners' Gala until 17 July 1954. Goods traffic was discontinued on 9 March 1964.

Preceding station	Disused railways	Following station
Blackhill; Line and station closed	North Eastern Railway; Lanchester Valley Railway	Lanchester; Line and station closed
