= Lanchester railway station =

Disused railway station in Lanchester, County Durham

Lanchester
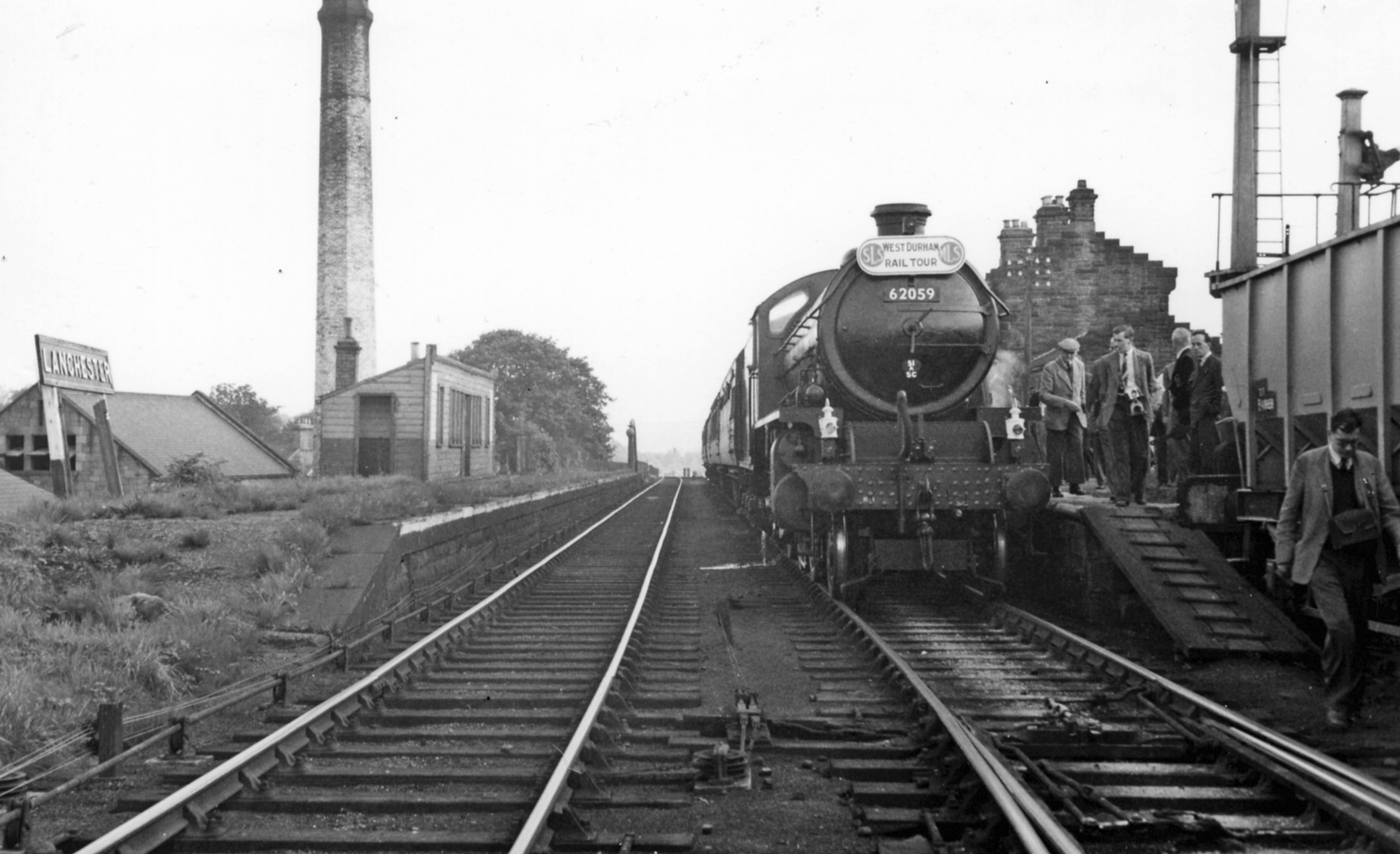
- Lanchester station 1958

General information
- Location: Lanchester, County Durham; England
- Coordinates: 54.8212°N 1.7462°W
- Grid reference: NZ164474
- Platforms: 2

Other information
- Status: Disused

History
- Original company: North Eastern Railway
- Post-grouping: London and North Eastern Railway

Key dates
- 1 September 1862: Opened
- 1 May 1939: Closed to passengers
- 5 July 1965: Closed completely
Location

Lanchester railway station served the village of Lanchester, County Durham, England from 1862 to 1965 on the Lanchester Valley Line.

== History ==
The station opened on 1 September 1862 by the North Eastern Railway. It was situated on the north side of Cadger Bank. The NER doubled the station's tracks in anticipation of the demand from collieries along with Knitsley, Bearpark, Malton and Langley. Like the rest of the stations on the line, this station closed to passengers on 1 May 1939. The station was occasionally used by Miners' Gala along with the rest of the stations on the line until 17 July 1954. The station closed to goods traffic on 5 July 1965.

Preceding station	Disused railways	Following station
Knitsley; Line and station closed	North Eastern Railway; Lanchester Valley Line	Witton Gilbert; Line and station closed
