= Langley Park, County Durham =

Village in County Durham, England

Coordinates: 54.799°N 1.670°W

Langley Park
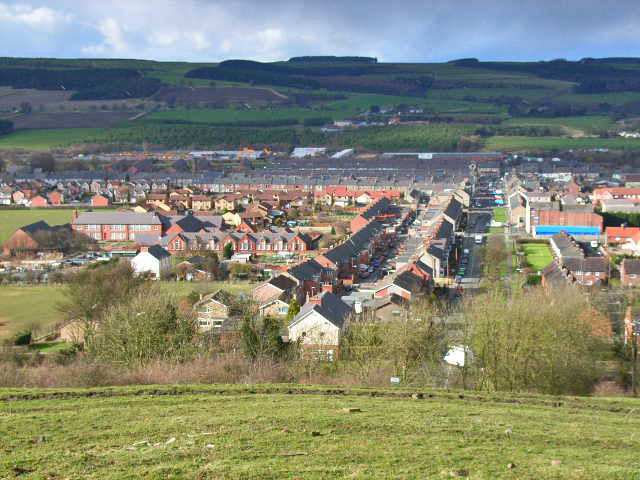
- Langley Park

- Location within County Durham
- OS grid reference: NZ212449
- Unitary authority: County Durham
- Ceremonial county: County Durham
- Region: North East
- Country: England
- Sovereign state: United Kingdom
- Post town: DURHAM
- Postcode district: DH7
- Dialling code: 0191
- Police: Durham
- Fire: County Durham and Darlington
- Ambulance: North East
- UK Parliament: North West Durham

Langley Park is a village in County Durham, England. The historic city of Durham lies 4 miles (6.4 km) to the east.

The village has a wide variety of shops and amenities and is also home to Diggerland, where children of all ages can take control of a variety of heavy machinery and take rides over the former colliery ground on bulldozers and Land Rovers. The village has a primary school which includes nursery, reception, infant and junior classes.

The Lanchester Valley Railway Path runs along the northern edge of Langley Park on the site of the disused Consett Iron Works railway line. It is designated as National Route 14 on the Sustrans National Cycle Network which runs from Haswell, via Durham City, to Consett.

Langley Park has grown steadily in recent years and has benefited from the influx of new residents, who are attracted to the village by the construction of several housing developments. Current housing projects are underway on the site of the former Kings Picture house and Hilltop View and plans are in hand to construct houses on the current site of Anderson & Young coachworks.

The River Browney, which flows to the north of the village, has recovered from the effects of contamination caused by a century of local industry and is fished regularly both by anglers and by otters, who have made a return to the river in recent years.

There are Commonwealth War Graves in the cemetery of the Anglican church, All Saints in Langley Park, which is also the only grave of the unknown soldier outside London.

== History ==
=== Langley Park Colliery ===
The sinking of the first shaft was begun in 1871 and mining started two years later. This shaft was still in existence in 1975, when the colliery closed. Sixty-two miners died in the mine during this period, the last being Eric Weighill, who was killed by a rock fall in 1971, aged 29.

== Film, TV and literature ==
The producers of the 2000 film Billy Elliot filmed one of the scenes in the changing rooms of Langley Park school. This was just one of many occasions where the village has been used as a location for film and television productions. These include Days of Hope (1974), The Stars Look Down (1975), A Captain's Tale (1982) and Ripping Yarns (1977).

The BBC television comedy The Fast Show also used the village as a location, with Railway Street being frequently employed as a set to film scenes of "Unlucky Alf". Railway Street's main attraction for film and TV companies is that it has remained essentially unchanged from the time of its construction in the late 19th century (although most – if not all – residents no longer have to leave their house and cross the street to the outside toilets that remain as a reminder of a bygone age).

Such lavatories are described in detail in The Bootlace Boys, a novel by Eric Collinson that is set in Langley Park at the turn of the 19th and 20th centuries, describing Langley Park villagers both at home and on the Western Front during the First World War.

== People ==
In 1988 the group Prefab Sprout released the album From Langley Park to Memphis. Group members Paddy and Martin McAloon were brought up in the nearby village of Witton Gilbert.

The village was also the childhood home of former Ipswich Town, England, Barcelona and Newcastle manager Sir Bobby Robson, who went to school there. His family still live in the village.
