= Walney to Wear and Whitby Cycle Route =

Long-distance cycle path in England

The Walney to Wear and Whitby Cycle Route (or W2W) is the name of a cross-country cycle route in Northern England. It runs from Walney Island in Cumbria to Sunderland on the River Wear or Whitby.

== History ==
The route was launched on 1 June 2005 to complement the popular Sea to Sea Cycle Route (C2C) that runs from Whitehaven to Sunderland. It is designed to be slightly harder and longer than this other route, totalling either 149 or 151 miles (240 or 243 km). When launched, the route used sections of NCN Routes 72, 68, and 71 west of the Pennines. From Tan Hill to Sunderland, a new Regional Route was created and given the number 20, with a blue background. In 2012, after improvements to meet National Cycle Network standards, it was upgraded to National Route 70. Route signs were changed to the number 70 with a red background. Around the same time, the sections on the route that had previously been Route 71 and 72 were re-signed as Route 70. In 2007, a southern branch from Barnard Castle to Whitby was added. Originally classified as regional route 52, it was upgraded to National Cycle Route 165 in 2012. The Walney to Whitby route is 179 miles (288 km).

== Route ==
The W2W is a Y-shaped route with one western leg from Walney to Barnard Castle, and two eastern legs Barnard Castle, to Sunderland (northern) and Barnard Castle to Whitby (Southern).

=== Western leg ===
103 miles (166 km) Walney to Barnard Castle

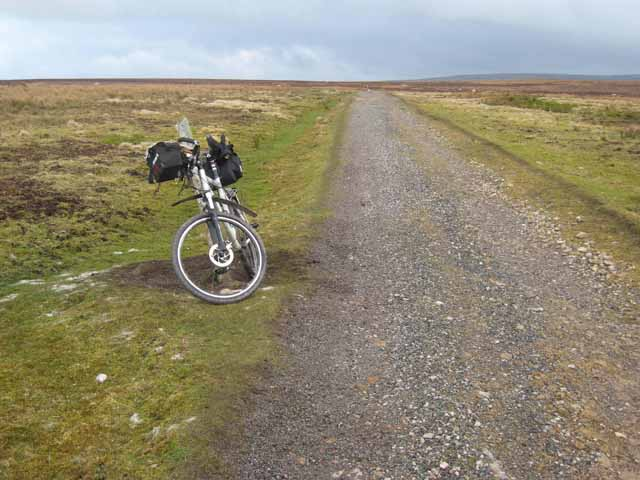
Near Tan Hill

- From Walney Island in the Irish Sea (54.1026°N 3.2627°W) it goes on to the industrial port of Barrow-in-Furness.
- It then runs through the Furness peninsula, passing towns such as Ulverston and the picturesque Grange-Over-Sands, where the route follows the Promenade.
- The route continues to skirt the Lake District National Park towards the historical market town of Kendal.
- After this, the path continues northwards, before moving in an easterly direction towards Kirkby Stephen and through the Pennines to Barnard Castle in County Durham.

=== North Eastern leg ===
49 miles (79 km) Barnard Castle to Sunderland

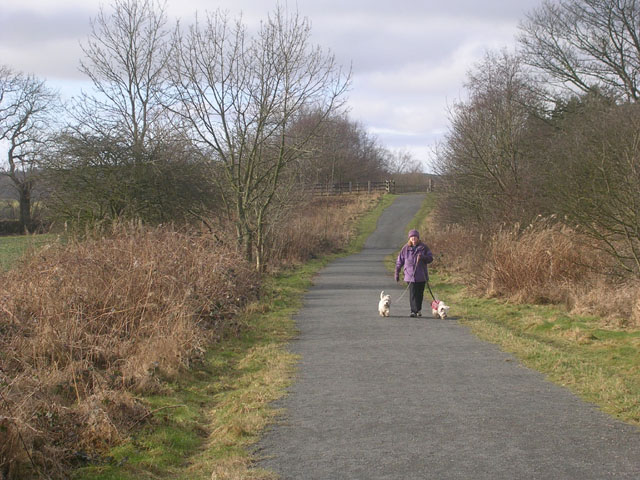
Near Brancepeth

- The northerly spur passes through Hamsterley to reach the cathedral city of Durham. National Route 715 between Barnard Castle and Willington is an alternative W2W route. It is 2 miles (3.2 km) shorter and an easier ride via Bishop Auckland.
- The final 18 miles (29 km) of the W2W follows the River Wear to the North Sea at Sunderland (54.9203°N 1.3639°W).

=== South Eastern leg ===
76 miles (122 km) Barnard Castle to Whitby

- From Barnard Castle, the route descends off the Durham Dales along the lower Teesdale for 20 miles (32 km), to Croft-on-Tees near Darlington.
- Continuing on flat roads for 27 miles (43 km) until it reaches the North York Moors at Great Ayton.
- Following the Eskdale for the final 27 miles (43 km) the route crosses the River Esk five times before reaching Whitby. This section includes several steep climbs and descents, some of which are on off-road tracks.
