= Bigland Tarn =

Lake in Cumbria, England

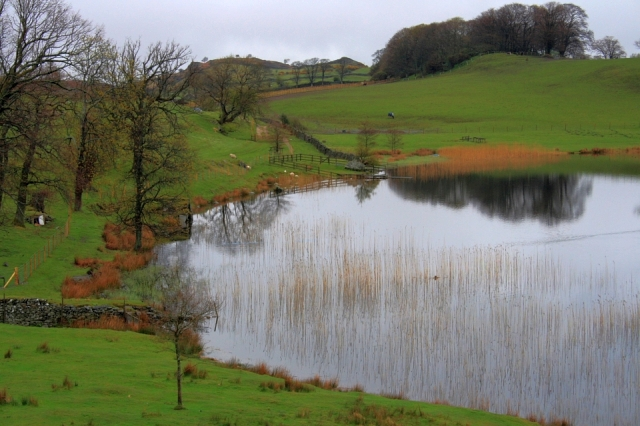

- Location in the Lake District National Park Location in South Lakeland, Cumbria
- Location: Lake District, England
- Coordinates: 54°14′17″N 2°59′30″W
- Type: Tarn
- Basin countries: United Kingdom
- Max. length: 325 m (1,066 ft)
- Max. width: 225 m (738 ft)
- Surface area: 5.1 hectares (13 acres)
- Surface elevation: 158 m (518 ft)

Bigland Tarn is a lake in Cumbria, England, about 3/4 mile southeast of Haverthwaite. Located at an elevation of 158 m (518 ft), the lake has an area of 5.1 hectares (13 acres) and measures 325 m × 225 m (1,066 ft × 738 ft).

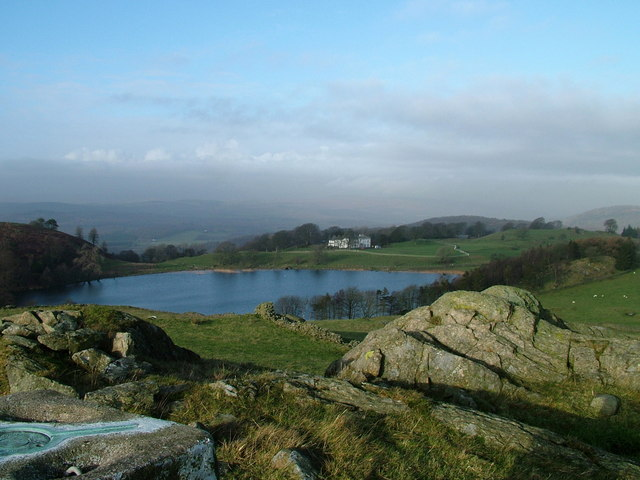
