= River Browney =

River in County Durham, England

Coordinates: 54.804°N 1.927°W

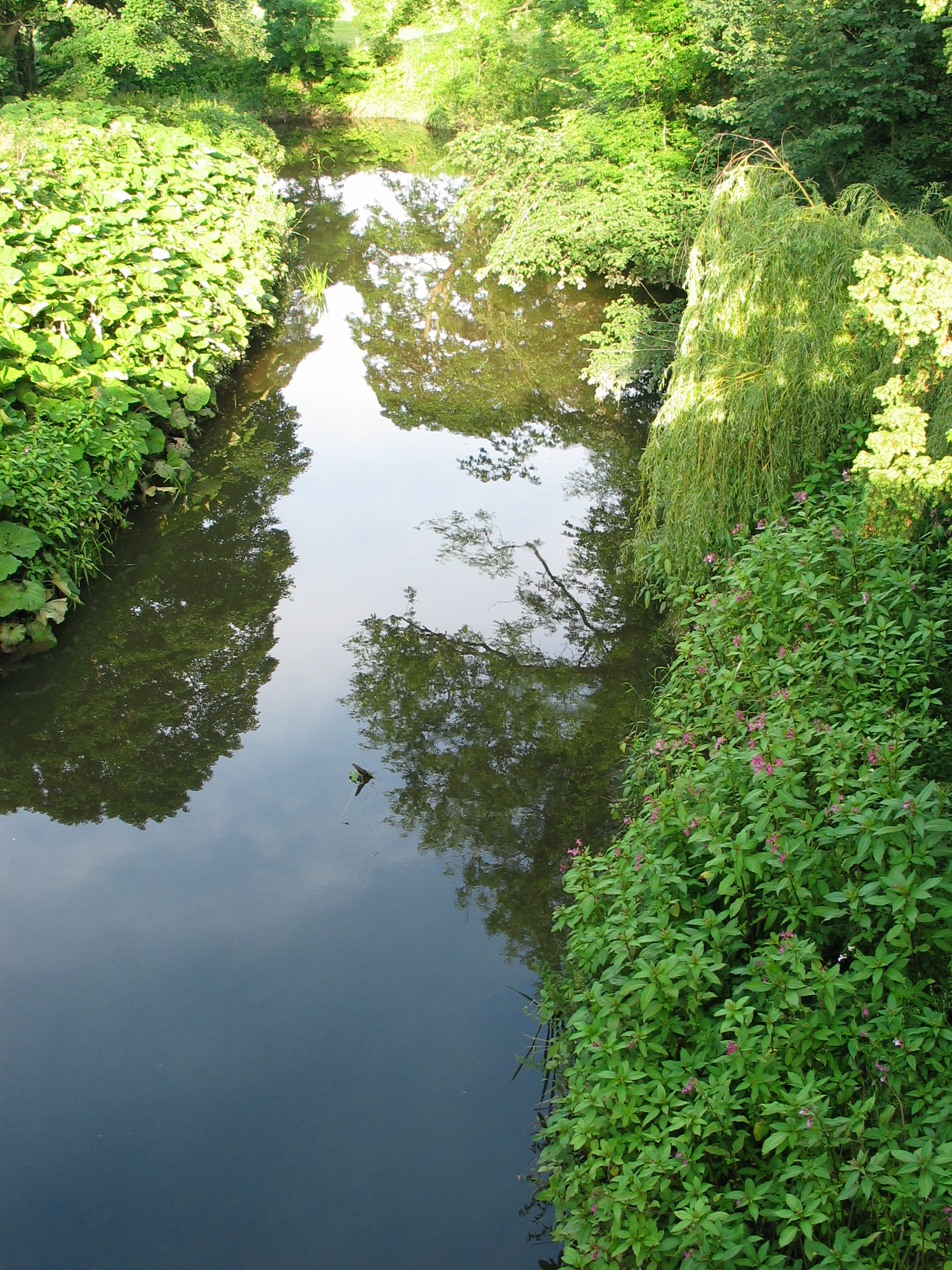
The River Browney at Sunderland Bridge, shortly before its confluence with the River Wear. Scented Himalayan balsam has invaded the right riverbank, giving the site a sweet, floral smell.

The River Browney is a river in County Durham, England, and the largest tributary of the River Wear.

The River Browney rises from a spring in Head Plantation, on the eastern slope of Skaylock Hill, about a mile south east of Waskerley. The spring rises approximately 500 metres (550 yd) from a tributary stream to the River Wear, in an area of moorland, forestry and springs, and of disused coal mines, quarries and mineral railway lines, remnants of an industrial past. Running eastwards towards Lanchester, the river skirts to the south of the village. Continuing eastwards past Langley Park and Witton Gilbert, the river then turns south and skirts the western edge of Durham. The Browney is joined by the River Deerness north of Langley Moor and finally joins the Wear to the south of Durham, close to Sunderland Bridge. Until the last ice age, the Browney entered the River Wear just north of Durham City, in Pelaw Woods.

The Browney was contaminated by local industry, particularly lead and coal mining, but has recovered in recent years. The river was stocked with around 3,000 grayling in September 2006.

Legend has it that following his defeat at Neville's Cross in 1346, King David II of Scotland was captured having sought shelter under a bridge over the Browney at Bearpark, close by where his Scottish soldiers had camped overnight beneath Beaurepaire Priory.

Andrew Breeze has argued that the river name forms the first element of 'Brunanburh', in the Battle of Brunanburh. He interprets 'Brunanburh' as 'stronghold of the Browney', referring to the Roman fort of Longovicium.

== See also ==
- List of rivers of England
