= Bearpark =

Village and civil parish in County Durham, England

Coordinates: 54.782222°N 1.630000°W

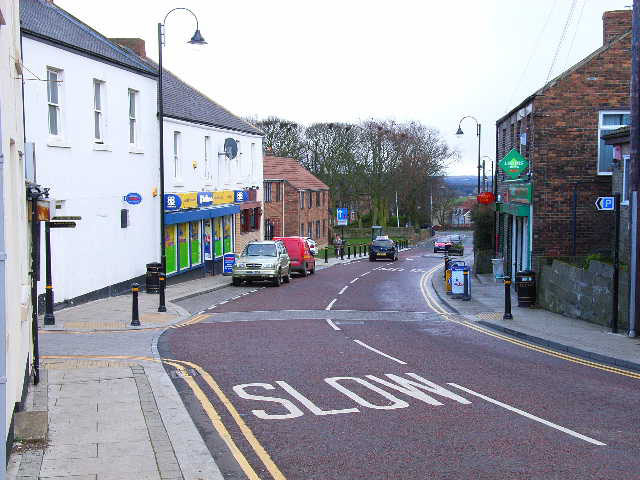
- The centre of Bearpark village

- Location within County Durham
- Population: 2,283 (2011 Census)
- OS grid reference: NZ238431
- Unitary authority: County Durham
- Ceremonial county: Durham
- Region: North East
- Country: England
- Sovereign state: United Kingdom
- Post town: DURHAM
- Postcode district: DH7
- Dialling code: 0191
- Police: Durham
- Fire: County Durham and Darlington
- Ambulance: North East
- UK Parliament: City of Durham

Bearpark is a village and civil parish in County Durham in England. It is situated two and a half miles west of Durham, and a short distance to the north of Ushaw Moor. The name may be a corruption of the French term Beau Repaire, meaning "beautiful retreat", referring to the medieval manor house of the Prior of Durham situated to the north of the present village.

== History ==
=== Manor House ===
The ruins of Beaurepaire Manor House, formerly the country retreat of the priors of Durham.

The ruins of Beaurepaire Manor House, sometimes called Beaurepaire Priory, stand approximately half a mile north of the present village of Bearpark, overlooking the River Browney. The manor was established in the mid-13th century by Bertram de Middleton, Prior of Durham from 1244 to 1258. Rather than an independent monastery, Beaurepaire was the principal country retreat of the priors of Durham, offering them and the Benedictine monks of Durham Priory opportunities for recreation away from the monastery. A stud of horses was maintained on the estate, alongside cattle and sheep. The manor fulfilled a role similar to that of nearby Finchale Priory. The estate included a hunting park covering approximately 1,300 acres (526 hectares), while the manor itself developed into a substantial complex containing a great hall, chapel and residential accommodation.

Beaurepaire was an important centre of social life for the Durham monastic community. The monks regularly attended recreational gatherings known as the prior's games (ludi), which could take place four times a year and last for two weeks or more. Records of one such gathering in 1391 indicate that five cattle, twenty-two sheep and seven pigs were consumed over a fortnight. The priors also entertained senior members of the monastic community and local dignitaries at the manor. The manor also accommodated royal visitors, including Kings Edward I, Edward II and Edward III, who visited between 1296 and 1335.

The manor suffered extensive damage during Scottish attacks culminating in the nearby Battle of Neville's Cross in 1346. It was subsequently repaired and enlarged under Prior William Fossour and remained a residence of the priors until the Dissolution of the Monasteries. Afterwards, the property passed to the deans of Durham. Much of the complex was destroyed by Scottish forces in 1640 and 1644, during the conflicts of the Wars of the Three Kingdoms, and the remaining buildings gradually fell into ruin.

Archaeological excavations during the 1980s uncovered substantial sections of the medieval foundations. The surviving remains, which include portions of the hall, residential buildings and chapel, form a roughly E-shaped complex arranged around two courtyards. The ruins are protected as both a Scheduled monument and a Grade II listed building.

=== Coal mining ===
There is evidence of mining at Bearpark dating from the 15th century, with Durham Cathedral's medieval accounts recording expenditure on coal pits there. The Priory operated some mines itself, or else allowed other operators to mine the seams in return for payment. During this period the mines were small in scale, using only a handful of hewers at each location, with the coal supplied to a small number of lords and monastic tenants in the immediate vicinity and to the Priory itself.

In 1872, the Bearpark Coal and Coke Company, whose directors included Theodore Fry, established Bearpark Colliery. At its peak in 1925, the colliery employed 1,367 people. It also operated coke ovens and a chemical plant that produced industrial coal by-products. By 1947, its annual output was recorded as approximately 350,000 tons of coal. The mine closed on 6 April 1984, shortly after the beginning of the miners' strike.

Bearpark Community Centre is at the hub of the local village, a red brick building originally built in 1921 as a miners' welfare hall. An old pit wheel stands in front of the building, a memorial to the village's mining history.

== In popular culture ==
Bearpark featured on the BBC radio and television series Uncanny, citing the case of a Victorian boy haunting a house in the village.

Bearpark is the subject of a song by Durham-based band Prefab Sprout.
