= National Cycle Route 14 =

Three Rivers cycle route from Darlington to South Shields, England

Coordinates: 54.5445°N 1.9274°W

National Cycle Route 14 forms part of the National Cycle Network in North East England. It connects Darlington in County Durham with South Shields on the River Tyne. The route has currently (2016) a length of 86 miles (138 km). Much of it uses paths along disused railway lines and is thus free from motor traffic.

== Sections ==
The route is signed in both directions but is described here per Sustrans' publication in the direction from Darlington to South Shields.

=== Darlington to Hartlepool ===
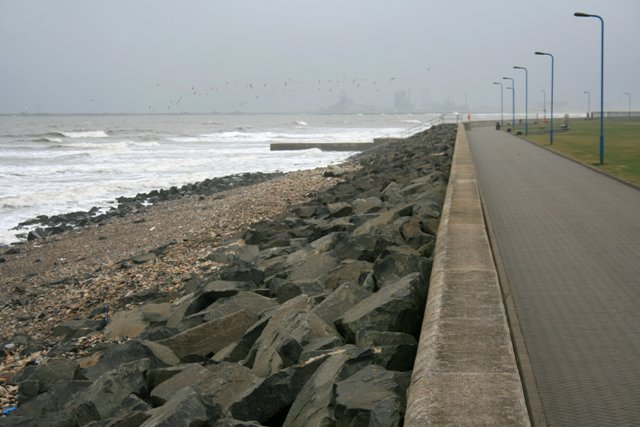
Promenade at Seaton Carew near Hartlepool

From Darlington to Middleton St George the route follows the former Stockton and Darlington Railway line. It continues north-east on a combination of on-road and so-called traffic free (i.e. without motor traffic) sections towards Stockton-on-Tees, passes the latter town on National Cycle Route 1 and continues to Hartlepool. More than half of the latter stretch is separated from motor traffic.

=== Hartlepool to Durham ===
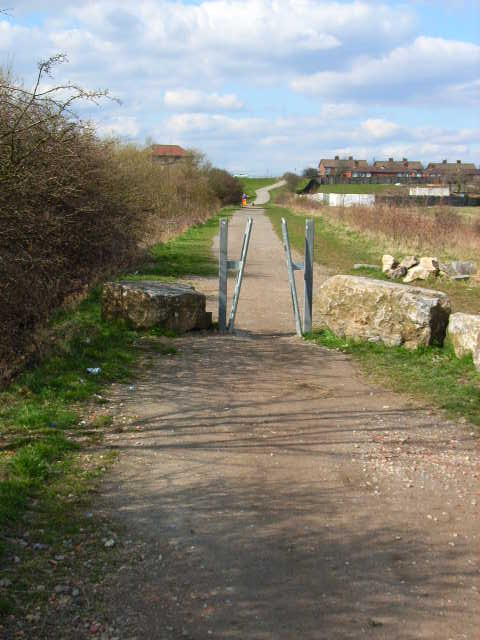
Haswell to Hart Railway Path, near Shotton Colliery

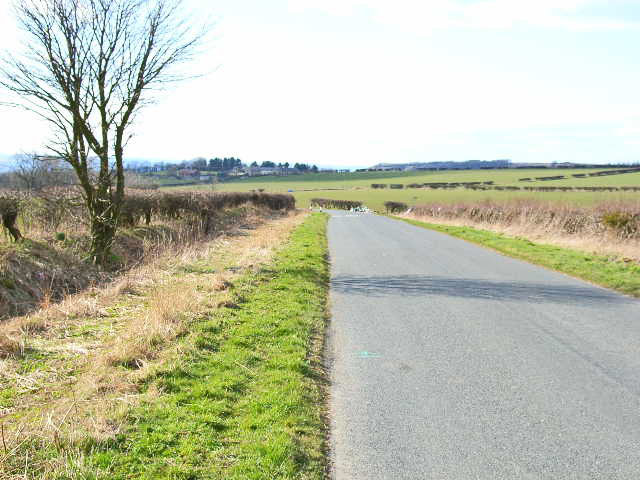
Near Haswell Moor Farm

Again on a combination of on-road and traffic-free sections, the route turns away from the coast in a north-western direction along the former Clarence and Hartlepool Junction Railway, now known as the Hart to Haswell Walkway. From a junction east of Wingate, National Cycle Route 1 also uses the disused railway line. In Haswell, the cycle routes separate, and route 14 continues westwards to Durham, mainly on roads.

=== Durham to South Shields ===
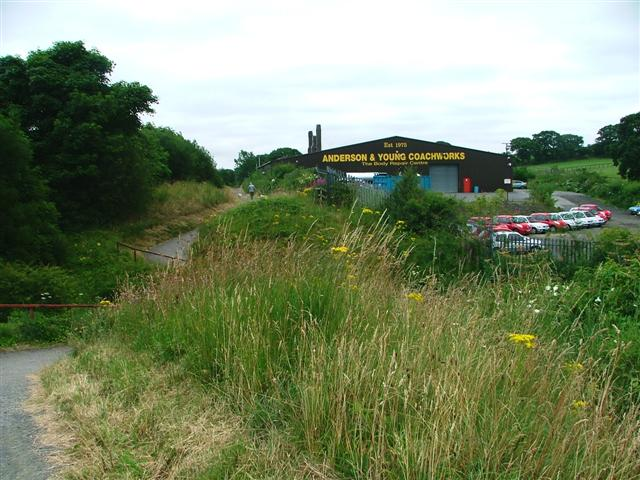
Near former Witton Gilbert railway station

After heading west out of Durham, the route follows the Lanchester Valley Railway Path north-west to Consett. Continuing north-east mainly on disused railway lines, it crosses the River Derwent several times. At the mouth of the latter, it meets the River Tyne and continues along its southern bank eastward to South Shields. Most of this section is traffic-free except for some short parts along the Tyne.

Between Stockton-on-Tees and South Shields the route is also signposted as the Three Rivers Cycle Route, between Consett and South Shields it shares the way with the Sea to Sea (C2C) route connecting the west and east coasts of England.
