= Durham Dales =

Valleys in County Durham, England

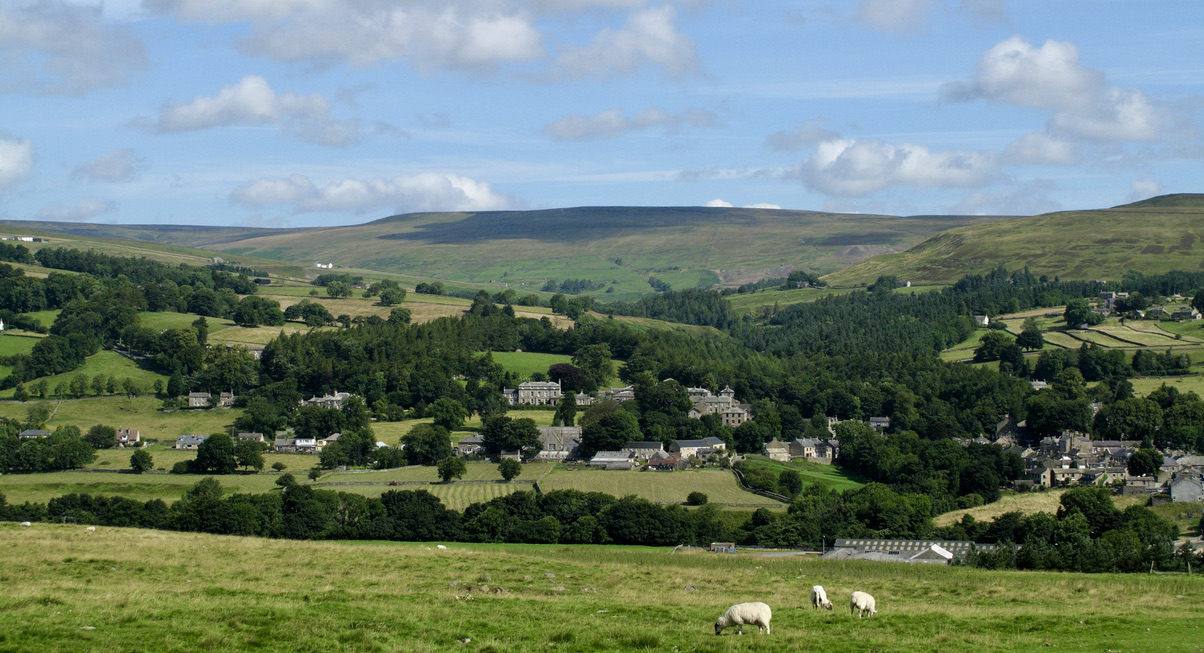
A view over Middleton-in-Teesdale

The Durham Dales are a series of valleys in the west of County Durham, North East England. They are the Durham portion of the North Pennines, the northernmost part of the Pennine uplands. The principal valleys are Teesdale in the south and Weardale in the north, each of which has several side valleys, including Baldersdale, Lunedale, and Rook Hope. The part of Teesdale south of the Tees was historically part of the North Riding of Yorkshire.

== Geography ==
The Durham Dales consist primarily of a series of high exposed moorlands, hills and mountains, a number exceeding a height of 2,000 ft above sea level, along with the valleys or dales, from which the area gets its name. These valleys include Teesdale and Weardale. The area covers roughly one third of County Durham and is its least populous area.

=== Settlements ===
There are just a few market towns within the area—Barnard Castle, Consett, Middleton-in-Teesdale, Stanhope, Tow Law, and Wolsingham,—though some also consider the Durham Dales to extend as far east as Bishop Auckland and Crook. There are a number of small villages in the area, which in general tend to be sparsely populated and spread out, in great contrast to much of the rest of County Durham.

=== Geology ===
Like much of the North Pennines, the Durham Dales form an anticline, with carboniferous limestone exposed at the surface. The Durham Dales, like much of the Pennines, have long been exploited for their rich mineralogical resources, notably lead and ironstone.

=== Ecology ===
Many of the high hills are occupied by moors with peat-mosses, the higher ground being uncultivable and barely fit for pastures. As with much of the landscape of the Pennines, they are generally upland areas of high moorland indented by the more fertile valleys of various rivers and streams.

The Durham Dales constitute the principal watershed for the county of Durham, as well as contributing to those of the neighbouring counties of Cumbria, Northumberland and North Yorkshire. The rivers Wear, Tees and Derwent all rise in the Durham Dales and flow eastward towards the North Sea. The Derwent helps to form County Durham's northerly border, and the Tees traditionally its southern border.

Along the course of the Tees are the three attractions of the High Force, Low Force and Cauldron Snout waterfalls.
