= National Cycle Route 1 =

Cycle route in the United Kingdom

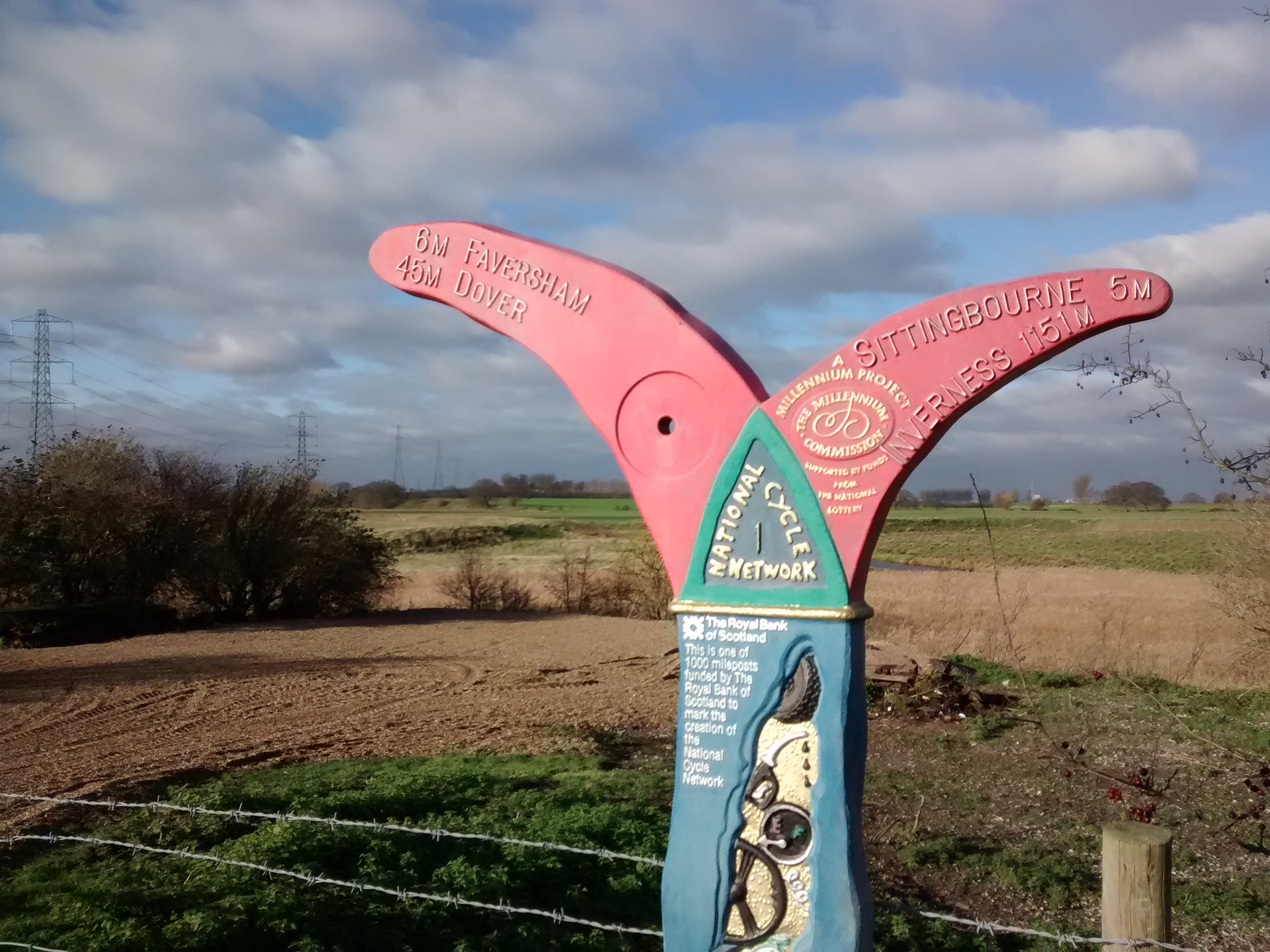
- A milepost on National Cycle Route 1 at Conyer, Kent.
- Length: 2,034 km (1,264 mi)
- Location: United Kingdom
- Designation: UK National Cycle Network
- Trailheads: Dover (south) to Tain (north)
- Use: Cycling
- Waymark
- Surface: Varies from on-road to traffic-free tarmac to compacted surface
- Website: www.sustrans.org.uk/find-a-route-on-the-national-cycle-network/route-1/
Trail map

National Cycle Route 1 (or NCR 1) is a route of the United Kingdom National Cycle Network, running from Dover to Tain. The 1,264 mi-long (2,034-kilometre) cycle-path runs the length of the east coast, passing through London and Edinburgh.

== Route ==
=== Dover to Canterbury ===
Dover | Deal | Sandwich | Canterbury

Links with National Cycle Route 2, Regional route 16, and Regional route 17 in Dover. Leaves Dover passing Dover Castle. South Foreland Lighthouse is visible from the route. Mostly traffic-free along the east coast from Kingsdown to Deal, passing Walmer Castle and Deal Castle. Follows toll road (free to cyclists) through the Royal Cinque Ports Golf Club to the town of Sandwich. In Sandwich the route links with Regional route 15.

Shortly after leaving Sandwich the route passes Richborough Castle, then follows quiet country roads between some of Kent's orchards. The route passes through the villages of Westmarsh, Elmstone, Preston. The route then passes through the town of Fordwich, then traffic-free into the city of Canterbury. At Canterbury the route links with Regional route 16 again, and with National Cycle Route 18.

=== Canterbury to Sittingbourne ===
Canterbury | Whitstable | Faversham | Sittingbourne

From Canterbury the route follows the traffic-free Crab and Winkle Way (which part-follows the route of the former Canterbury and Whitstable Railway) to Whitstable. The route then heads West across Graveney Marsh, through the village of Graveney to the town of Faversham.

Following Faversham the route passes between more orchards then through the village of Conyer and beside Swale Marina towards the town of Sittingbourne. In Sittingbourne the route mainly follows cycle paths and shared-use footpaths beside the road.

=== Sittingbourne to London ===
Sittingbourne | Rochester | Gravesend | Dartford | Crayford | Erith | Thamesmead | Woolwich | Greenwich | Millwall

The route leaves Sittingbourne via a bridge over the A249 dual-carriageway. National Cycle Route 174 (A spur of NCN 1) then heads North through the village of Iwade and on to Minster and Sheerness on the Isle of Sheppey. The main route heads West towards the village of Newington, and from there on to Rainham in the Medway towns.

At Lower Rainham the route heads into Riverside Country Park and follows traffic-free paths beside the River Medway. It then joins a cycle path beside the main road, before joining a quiet path again beside the river at The Strand. Following The Strand the route once again joins a cycle path beside the main road, heading towards Chatham Historic Dockyard.

Following the NCN1 through Rochester the route uses a cycle lane in the road. It then links with National Cycle Route 17 towards Maidstone before crossing the Medway using a cycle path beside the road on a bridge into Strood. Rochester Castle is accessible via a short cycle along NCR 17 The route then heads to Upper Upnor using a mixture of quiet roads, footpaths, and cycle paths. It passes Upnor Castle here.

At the turning on to the A228 and just arriving in the village of Higham there are links to the Regional route 18 (The Heron Trail) on the Hoo Peninsula. On the approach to Gravesend, the route runs beside the Thames and Medway Canal.

It then passes through the town of Gravesend, close to the Thames and following the Saxon Shore footpath route as well. The route heads up to follow a dismantled railway route to Northfleet. It passes Northfleet Urban Country Park and towards the Ebbsfleet International before taking the A2260 (passing over High Speed 1 line). The route follows the A2 Dual Carriageway for a short section (off-road) before taking the A296 towards Bluewater (shopping centre).

The (off-road) route follows the old Roman road Watling Street to the Fleetdowns suburb of Dartford. The route heads along Princes Road and Fleet Road. It passes over the A282 (part of the M25 heading towards the Dartford Crossing). The route then heads to Dartford town centre.

It passes under the railway line (Dartford to Gravesend) and takes the A2026 road towards Crayford. After crossing the River Cray, it joins with the London Loop to head to the River Thames again via a narrow and poorly surfaced path. It then becomes the River Thames Path, from Crayford Ness to Erith, Thamesmead, Woolwich and Greenwich.

At Greenwich, the route passes Cutty Sark and Cutty Sark DLR station which passes Greenwich Pier under the river via the foot tunnel to Island Gardens on the Isle of Dogs. The foot tunnel has lifts at both ends but the tunnel has to be walked along.

=== London to Colchester ===
Millwall | Poplar | Limehouse | Mile End | Victoria Park | Old Ford | Hackney Wick | Tottenham Hale | Enfield | Cheshunt | Harlow | Chelmsford | Witham | Maldon

The route runs past Island Gardens DLR station and around Mudchute Park to Mudchute DLR station, turning before Crossharbour DLR station to Millwall Dock which it crosses via Pepper Street. The route passes through the housing estates of Millwall near South Quay to head to Limehouse Reach. It again follows the Thames Path until Newell Street passing Canary Wharf Pier into Limehouse on Limehouse Causeway (east of Westferry DLR station) where it links with National Cycle Route 13 and Cycle Superhighway CS3. It heads up Newell Street to Commercial Road, passing over the Limehouse Cut and the Lea Valley Walk. The route heads along Salmon Lane to Regent's Canal towpath heading north to Mile End passing Mile End Stadium into Mile End Park past Mile End Underground station over The Green Bridge on Mile End Road and Cycle Superhighway CS2 from which it rejoin the Regent's Canal via the north part of Mile End Park.

After once again leaving the Regent's Canal heading into Victoria Park passing through it southern side and which involves crossing over Grove Road on a cycle lane from the west park to the east park on the outer roundabout on the northern side between Grove Road and Old Ford Road, the route continues into Victoria Park till the Parnell Road footbridge in Old Ford where it joins the Hertford Union Canal towpath to River Lee Navigation via Old Ford to Hackney Wick. It passes the Olympic Stadium in Queen Elizabeth Olympic Park and Hackney Wick station, then Hackney Marshes before heading across the River Lea. The route passes Waterworks Nature Reserve, under Lea Bridge Road, and through Leyton Marshes. It passes under two railways (between Stratford and Tottenham, and the Clapton to Walthamstow line). It then passes under the Stratford and Tottenham line again and past Walthamstow Marshes to follow the River Lea again.

The route skirts West Warwick Reservoir before passing under the Stratford and Tottenham line again, and then the South Tottenham to Blackhorse Road railway line. It passes under the A503 in Tottenham Hale. It passes along Lockwood Reservoir to Banbury Reservoir. It passes several trading estates in Edmonton and under the A406. It heads past the William Girling Reservoir and National Athletics Stadium at Picketts Lock. It crosses under the A110 near Ponders End, then past King George V Reservoir to Enfield Lock. Here there is a junction with National Cycle Route 12 NCR 12. It heads away from the River Lea Navigation to pass through Enfield Island Village to follow the River Lea through Gunpowder Park to the A121 to Waltham Abbey.

Continuing north, route 1 climbs away from the Lee Valley to a view point near Nazeing before descending back to the river at Dobbs Weir. Following the Lee and then the River Stort, to Roydon, Essex the route then climbs up into and through Harlow, leaving the new town via Old Harlow and then country lanes through rural Essex to Chelmsford.

It links with the proposed cycle route NCR 13 at Chelmsford, and the proposed NCR 16 route at Witham. It also connects with NCR 51 heading east at Colchester for access to Harwich International Port and the Regional route 41 coastal route via Felixstowe.

=== Colchester to Norwich ===
Colchester | Ipswich | Woodbridge | Framlingham | Halesworth | Beccles | Norwich

From Colchester take NCR 51 to Harwich International Port or continue to Ipswich along minor roads. Note that (as of December 2007) the route is being changed, and part is still unsigned. The old route passes to the north of Ipswich, the new route comes into the centre of the town and along the Waterfront.

From Ipswich take the NCR 51 west towards Cambridge, or NCR 51 east for Felixstowe and then either to Harwich and the Harwich International Port via a foot ferry or north using RCR 41 via Bawdsey Ferry (summer only) into Suffolk Coast and Heaths Area of Outstanding Natural Beauty to connect back up with NCR 1 further north.

As NCR1 (the new route) leaves Ipswich it passes along a good off-road cycle route through the Grange Farm area and out to Woodbridge along minor roads.

=== Norwich to Lincoln ===
Norwich | Fakenham | King's Lynn | Wisbech | Holbeach | Boston | Lincoln

Links with NCR 13 near Fakenham for access south to Thetford and with NCR 11 near King's Lynn for access to Ely and Cambridge

=== Lincoln to Scarborough ===
Lincoln | Market Rasen | Humber Bridge | Hull | Beverley | Driffield | Bridlington | Scarborough

The route passes through the east of Lincoln before using cycle lanes and cycle paths along the A46. Once out of the city it makes use of country lanes to Market Rasen. After which it rises up on to the Lincolnshire Wolds before descending in to Barton-upon-Humber where it crosses the Humber Bridge to Hessle in Yorkshire. The route here is mainly on country lanes with one section of bridle path at Hendale Wood. At Hessle the route meets Route 65 on the eastern Leg of the Trans Pennine Trail. Route 1 continues north through west Hull suburbs before reaching the town of Beverley. Using mainly country lanes via Driffield, the route reaches the North Sea coast at Bridlington. Between Bridlington and Scarborough the route climbs over the Yorkshire Wolds.

The 57 miles (92 km) of Route 1 between the junction of Route 164 in Beverly 53.8406°N 0.429°W and the junction with Route 166 in Hunmanby 54.182°N 0.3255°W are part of the Yorkshire Wolds Cycle Route.

Between Hutton Cranswick 53.9539°N 0.498°W and Bridlington 54.0924°N 0.1772°W Route 1 is the eastern end of the Way of the Roses Challenge Ride.

=== Scarborough to South Shields ===
Scarborough | Whitby | Redcar | Middlesbrough | Stockton on Tees | Sunderland | South Shields

From Scarborough to Whitby, the route uses the Cinder Track, an off-road footpath and cycleway that directly follows the course of the former Scarborough and Whitby Railway, and passes over the Larpool Viaduct. The route is disconnected between Whitby and Staithes. The North York Moors National Park Authority is researching the possibility of a cycle link between the two, possibly over an old railway line. After Staithes, the route drops back onto the road and follows the coast road to Redcar and through the south of Middlesbrough. Crossing the Tees Barrage at Stockton on Tees, the route then snakes through the town before joining the former Castle Eden Railway, now The Castle Eden Walkway. This travels directly north to Sunderland, snakes through the city and crosses the River Wear over the Wearmouth Bridge before heading towards the coast, where it then follows the coast road all the way to South Shields and reaching the River Tyne. The final part of this section of the route enters the Pedestrian and Cyclist Tyne Tunnel to cross the river to Newcastle upon Tyne.

=== South Shields to Edinburgh ===
The route continues from South Shields, via the Tyne Tunnel (pedestrian) at Jarrow, Percy Main (where it meets routes NCN 10 and NCN 72), North Shields, Tynemouth, Whitley Bay, Blyth, Northumberland, Amble, Lindisfarne, Berwick upon Tweed, Scottish Borders (Kelso, Melrose, Galashiels, Innerleithen), Dalkeith (sharing the route with NCN 76 after reaching Musselburgh) then enters Edinburgh via Newcraighall, Niddrie and St Leonards, briefly sharing the route with NCN 75 using George IV Bridge, The Mound and Hanover Street through the city centre. Route 1 heads west on George Street towards Haymarket then follows rail trails at Roseburn Path and Blackhall Path before passing through Davidson's Mains and Barnton to the north-western edge of the city.

=== Edinburgh to John o' Groats ===
Edinburgh | Dundee | Aberdeen | Inverness | Thurso | John o' Groats

The route heads northwest out of Edinburgh with NCN 76, which diverges at Cramond Brig through Dalmeny Estate to follow the coast. NCN 1 instead takes a more direct route to South Queensferry, alongside the A90 and through Dalmeny.

It then crosses the Forth Road Bridge and heads through Inverkeithing, again linking with NCN 76, and onwards north across the M90. The journey through Dunfermline's eastern suburbs is on traffic-free paths. Near Dunfermline Queen Margaret railway station it links with NCN 764, which travels west towards Clackmannan.

Out of Townhill the route uses country lanes and some B-roads, climbing into the Cleish Hills and passing through Blairadam Forest, then back under the M90 on its way to Kinross. NCN 1 now uses the Loch Leven Heritage Trail around the loch, before making its way east around the base of the Lomond Hills. In Falkland it links with NCN 776, which travels north towards Newburgh.

=== John o' Groats to Shetland ===
In the summer of 2020, Sustrans de-designated all of National Cycle Route 1 north of Tain in the Highlands, on safety grounds. This included all sections on the Orkney and Shetland islands.

== See also ==
- North Sea Cycle Route
