= Listed buildings in Preston-next-Wingham =

Historic structures in Kent, England

Preston-next-Wingham is a village and civil parish in the Dover District of Kent, England. It contains 44 listed buildings that are recorded in the National Heritage List for England. Of these one is grade I, one is grade II* and 42 are grade II.

This list is based on the information retrieved online from Historic England.

== Key ==
Grade	Criteria
I	Buildings that are of exceptional interest
II*	Particularly important buildings of more than special interest
II	Buildings that are of special interest

== Listing ==
Name	Grade	Location	Type	Completed (Note: The date given is the date used by Historic England as significant for the initial building or that of an important part in the structure's description.)	Date designated	Grid ref. (Note: The grid reference is based on the British national grid reference system, sometimes known as OSGB36, used by the Ordnance Survey.) Geo-coordinates	Notes	Entry number (Note: The "List Entry Number" is a unique number assigned to each listed building and scheduled monument by Historic England.)	Image	Wikidata
Preston Court Cottages	II	1 and 2, Court Lane			26 November 1987	TR2443460431; 51°17′55″N 1°13′05″E		1363278	Upload Photo	Q26645113
Church of St Mildred	I	Court Lane	church building		11 October 1963	TR2439160404; 51°17′55″N 1°13′03″E		1376652	Church of St Mildred More images	Q17529794
Granary About 50 Metres North West of Church of St Mildred	II	Court Lane			26 November 1987	TR2432360443; 51°17′56″N 1°12′59″E		1070152	Upload Photo	Q26323767
Oasts About 30 Metres North West of Church of St Mildred	II	Court Lane			26 November 1987	TR2435560427; 51°17′55″N 1°13′01″E		1363295	Upload Photo	Q26645128
Preston Court	II	Court Lane			11 October 1963	TR2439160533; 51°17′59″N 1°13′03″E		1031918	Upload Photo	Q26283313
Barn About 30 Metres South West of Deerson Farmhouse	II	Deerson Lane			26 November 1987	TR2392159822; 51°17′37″N 1°12′37″E		1363297	Upload Photo	Q26645130
Deerson Farmhouse	II	Deerson Lane			26 November 1987	TR2396059842; 51°17′37″N 1°12′39″E		1070153	Upload Photo	Q26323769
Wyborne's Charity	II	Deerson Lane			7 March 1983	TR2474459772; 51°17′34″N 1°13′19″E		1363296	Upload Photo	Q26645129
Headstone to Edmund Gibbs, About 1 Metre South of Nave of Elmstone Church	II	About 1 Metre South Of Nave Of Elmstone Church, Elmstone			26 November 1987	TR2614260278; 51°17′48″N 1°14′33″E		1070155	Upload Photo	Q26323772
Elmstone Church (dedication Unknown)	II*	Elmstone	church building		11 October 1963	TR2614960284; 51°17′48″N 1°14′33″E		1070154	Elmstone Church (dedication Unknown) More images	Q17557672
Elmstone Court	II	Elmstone, Elmstone Court			11 October 1963	TR2598660317; 51°17′50″N 1°14′25″E		1070156	Upload Photo	Q26323774
Two Chest Tombs to William and Edmund Gibbs About 3 and 10 Metres South of Elmstone Church	II	Elmstone			26 November 1987	TR2615060275; 51°17′48″N 1°14′33″E		1363298	Upload Photo	Q26645131
Ivy Cottage	II	Longmete Road			11 October 1963	TR2556460295; 51°17′49″N 1°14′03″E		1376870	Upload Photo	Q26657380
Ladydown Farmhouse Laydown Cottages	II	Longmete Road			26 November 1987	TR2531060342; 51°17′51″N 1°13′50″E		1070158	Upload Photo	Q26323778
Santon Farm Cottages	II	1 and 2, Lower Santon Lane			11 October 1963	TR2611561437; 51°18′26″N 1°14′34″E		1031351	Upload Photo	Q26282711
Outbuilding About 20 Metres North of Santon Farmhouse	II	Lower Santon Lane			26 November 1987	TR2611961459; 51°18′26″N 1°14′34″E		1070159	Upload Photo	Q26323780
Hardacre House	II	Mill Lane			13 October 1952	TR2523860973; 51°18′12″N 1°13′48″E		1031357	Upload Photo	Q26282717
Mill House	II	Mill Lane			26 November 1987	TR2560960968; 51°18′11″N 1°14′07″E		1070160	Upload Photo	Q26323781
Street Farm House	II	Mill Lane			11 October 1963	TR2509060934; 51°18′11″N 1°13′40″E		1376900	Upload Photo	Q26657409
The Breeches	II	Mill Lane, Elmstone			25 July 1980	TR2591760753; 51°18′04″N 1°14′22″E		1070161	Upload Photo	Q26323783
The Old Vicarage and Attached Garden Walls	II	Mill Lane, Elmstone			13 October 1952	TR2568260460; 51°17′55″N 1°14′09″E		1363300	Upload Photo	Q26645133
Forge Cottage	II	Padbrook Lane, Elmstone			26 November 1987	TR2585660622; 51°18′00″N 1°14′19″E		1070163	Upload Photo	Q26323787
How Wood Cottage	II	Padbrook Lane, Elmstone			26 November 1987	TR2607460427; 51°17′53″N 1°14′30″E		1031337	Upload Photo	Q26282695
Littlewick Cottage	II	Padbrook Lane, Elmstone			26 November 1987	TR2581360518; 51°17′56″N 1°14′16″E		1376902	Upload Photo	Q26657411
Old Brooke House	II	Padbrook Lane, Elmstone			26 November 1987	TR2582260511; 51°17′56″N 1°14′17″E		1070162	Upload Photo	Q26323785
Padbrook Cottage	II	Padbrook Lane			26 November 1987	TR2581260578; 51°17′58″N 1°14′16″E		1070164	Upload Photo	Q26323789
Little Perry	II	Perry Road			11 October 1963	TR2539459261; 51°17′16″N 1°13′52″E		1376886	Upload Photo	Q26657396
Carpenter's Farmhouse	II	Preston Lane			11 October 1963	TR2480559751; 51°17′33″N 1°13′23″E		1363301	Upload Photo	Q26645134
Sweech Cottage	II	Preston Lane			26 November 1987	TR2484560165; 51°17′46″N 1°13′26″E		1025894	Upload Photo	Q26276823
Sweech Farmhouse	II	Preston Lane			26 November 1987	TR2480760157; 51°17′46″N 1°13′24″E		1363302	Upload Photo	Q26645135
Forstal Farmhouse	II	The Forstal			20 August 1980	TR2487760667; 51°18′02″N 1°13′28″E		1031379	Upload Photo	Q26282739
Forstal House	II	The Forstal			11 October 1963	TR2467760719; 51°18′04″N 1°13′18″E		1070157	Upload Photo	Q26323776
Japonica Cottage	II	The Forstal			26 November 1987	TR2498760724; 51°18′04″N 1°13′34″E		1363299	Upload Photo	Q26645132
Little House About 10 Metres East of Japonica Cottage, the Forstal	II	The Forstal, The Street			26 November 1987	TR2500160715; 51°18′04″N 1°13′35″E		1070165	Upload Photo	Q26323791
Luckett Cottages	II	1 and 2, The Street			11 October 1963	TR2504360850; 51°18′08″N 1°13′37″E		1354761	Upload Photo	Q26637599
Wayside Cottages	II	1 and 2, The Street			26 November 1987	TR2506961079; 51°18′16″N 1°13′39″E		1070168	Upload Photo	Q26323797
Granary, About 20 Metres North West of Mossey's Farm Shop	II	The Street			26 November 1987	TR2490260551; 51°17′59″N 1°13′29″E		1025865	Upload Photo	Q26276796
Half Moon and Seven Stars	II	The Street			26 November 1987	TR2507361205; 51°18′20″N 1°13′40″E		1025877	Upload Photo	Q26276805
House About 20 Metres South of Preston House	II	The Street			26 November 1987	TR2506861017; 51°18′14″N 1°13′39″E		1363303	Upload Photo	Q26645136
Mossey's Farm Shop	II	The Street			19 June 1984	TR2492660526; 51°17′58″N 1°13′31″E		1070166	Upload Photo	Q26323793
Parsonage Farm	II	The Street			13 October 1987	TR2492660597; 51°18′00″N 1°13′31″E		1025901	Upload Photo	Q26276831
Preston House	II	The Street			26 November 1987	TR2505561042; 51°18′14″N 1°13′38″E		1025876	Upload Photo	Q26276804
The Old Bake House the Village Stores	II	The Street			26 November 1987	TR2506060932; 51°18′11″N 1°13′38″E		1070167	Upload Photo	Q26323795
Great Walmstone	II	Walmestone			26 November 1987	TR2569959338; 51°17′18″N 1°14′08″E		1070169	Upload Photo	Q26323799

== See also ==
- Grade I listed buildings in Kent
- Grade II* listed buildings in Kent

== Sources ==
- Newman, John (2013) [1969], Kent: North-East and East, The Buildings of England, New Haven and London: Yale University Press, ISBN 978-0-300-18506-5
