= National Cycle Route 13 =

Cycle route in the United Kingdom

The National Cycle Route 13 is a cycling route that is part of the National Cycle Network in the United Kingdom. It connects Tower Bridge in London with Fakenham in Norfolk.

== Overview ==
This route is still under development

This route links with the proposed NCR 16 near Basildon, it follows NCR 1 from Chelmsford to Hadleigh, it links with NCR 51 at Bury St Edmunds and then links again with NCR 1 near Fakenham

== Route ==
=== London to Chelmsford ===
Tower Bridge | Wapping | Limehouse | Poplar | Blackwall | Royal Victoria Dock | Beckton | Dagenham | Tilbury | Stanford-le-Hope | Basildon | Chelmsford

This route section is still under development. The route starts at the Tower Bridge, then follows the north bank of the River Thames heading eastwards, to Wapping and Limehouse before entering Poplar and Blackwall. Then it passes the Royal Victoria Docks to head via an off-road route towards the A13. It then joins the Cycle Superhighway 3 beside the A13 to head to Rainham, Greater London. On the Thurrock side, some small sections of National Cycle Network Route 13 are open, but this is mainly a work in progress. The current highlights of the route are Grays Riverside, Rainham Marshes Nature Reserve and the recently completed surfacing of the Mardyke Way (following the Mardyke (river)) between Ship Lane and Stifford Bridge. The riverside paths on both sides of the river are spectacular walking routes, but they are not currently open to cyclists (with a few exceptions).

=== Chelmsford to Bury St Edmunds ===
Chelmsford | Colchester | Sudbury | Lavenham | Bury St Edmunds |

This section of the route is under development. Only a short section near Sudbury is motor-traffic free, following a disused railway route to Long Melford. It then heads along the roads, to Lavenham, Cockfield, Suffolk, before entering Bury St Edmonds (via the small village of Rushbrooke). Some sections in the market town are motor-traffic free.

=== Bury St Edmunds to Fakenham ===
Bury St Edmunds, Suffolk | Thetford | Watton | Dereham | Fakenham, Norfolk

It then heads on mainly minor roads to Great Barton, Great Livermere, Honington, Coney Weston and Knettishall. Where it meets Regional Route 30 from Diss, Mellis and Eye. Then both cycle routes head towards Thetford. After Croxton, Norfolk, Regional Route 30 leads west to Brandon, Suffolk.

Route 13 carries on mainly minor roads towards East Wretham and Stonebridge, where it briefly meets and follows (for 3.5miles) the (long distance footpath) Peddars Way. It then heads towards Thompson, Watton, Bradenham, East Dereham, Gressenhall and Brisley. After the small village of Gately, it meets National Cycle Route 1 heading to Fakenham.

A feature of this 30-mile signed route is that it passes through the distinctive Breckland landscape of Mid-Norfolk.

== See also ==
Sustrans information on Route 13

The Brecks

Mid Norfolk leaflet
