= National Cycle Route 76 =

Cycle route in the United Kingdom

NCN Route 76
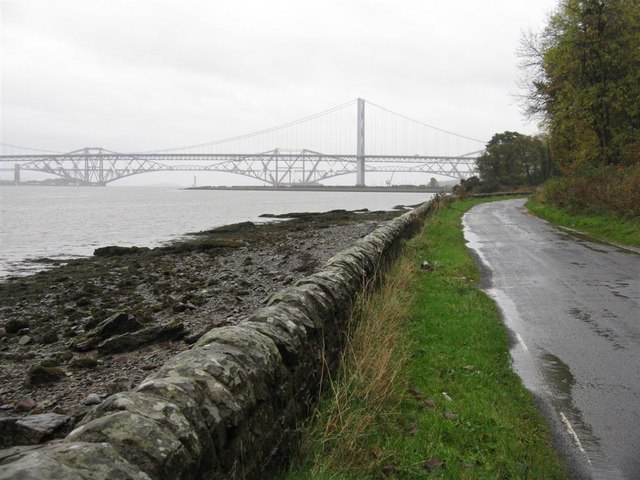
- Society Road, near Port Edgar, South Queensferry
- Length: 270 km (170 mi)
- Location: Firth of Forth
- Designation: National Cycle Network
- Trailheads: Berwick-upon-Tweed (south) to Kirkcaldy (north)
- Use: Cycling
- Highest point: 229 m (751 ft)
- Lowest point: 0 m (0 ft)
- Waymark
- Website: sustrans.org.uk

Trail map
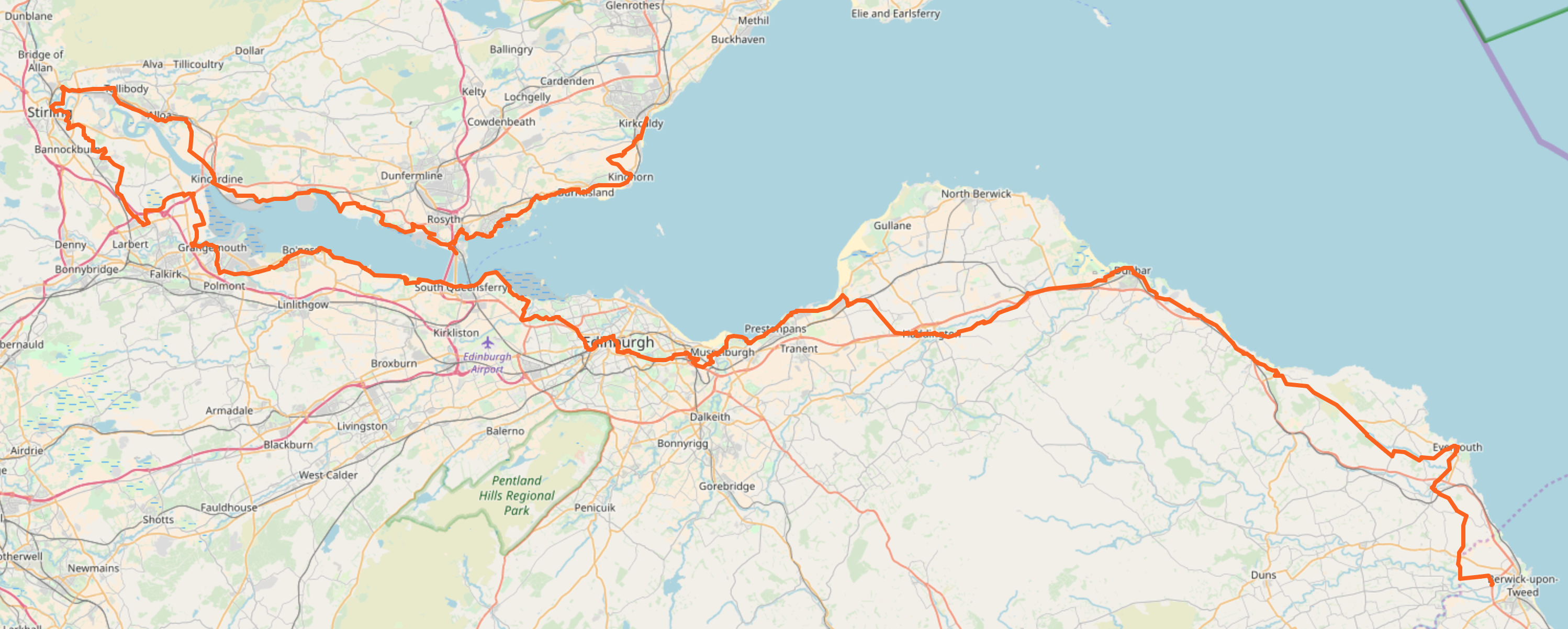
- Route 76 on OpenStreetMap

National Cycle Network (NCN) Route 76 is a Sustrans National Route that runs from Berwick-upon-Tweed to Kirkcaldy. The route is 168 miles (270 km) in length and is fully open and signed in both directions. Between Dunbar and Kirkcaldy the route is known as the Round the Forth.

== Route ==
=== Berwick-upon-Tweed to Dunbar ===
The southern trailhead is at a junction with NCN Route 1 on the outskirts of Berwick-upon-Tweed. After 2 miles (3.2 km) the route crosses the English-Scottish border and climbs Ayton Hill before descending through Ayton before meeting the coast at Eyemouth. From here the route climbs to its highpoint before descending to Cockburnspath where it passes under the A1. From Bilsdean the route uses a cycle path adjacent to the A1. At Torness Nuclear Power Station the route becomes traffic free to the outskirts of Dunbar before rejoining the roads through the town.

=== Dunbar to Musselburgh ===
From Dunbar Route 76 is known as the Round the Forth Cycle Route for the rest of its length to Kirkaldy. From here to Haddington the route is predominantly on quite roads via East Linton and the ruins of Hailes Castle. The route is traffic free along the 4.5 miles (7.2 km) Haddington to Longniddry railway path after which it uses a mixture of roads and paths along the shore of the Firth of Forth to reach Musselburgh and a junction with Route 1.

=== Edinburgh ===
There is a gap in Route 76 between Musselburgh and Cramond Bridge. Route 1 is used as the east to west link through Edinburgh.

=== Cramond Bridge to Stirling ===
Leaving Route 1 at Cramond Bridge, 76 is traffic free when returns to the banks of the Forth via the parklands of Dalmeny Estate, before passing under the Forth Bridges at South Queensferry where it returns the roads. Continuing to trace the south bank of the Forth the route becomes traffic free again as it passes through the deer park at Abercorn. It climbs away from the bank of the firth on the roads through Bo'ness to follow the line of the Antonine Wall before descending into Grangemouth.

The section between Cramond Bridge and Bo'ness is part of The John Muir Way.

On leaving Grangemouth the route crosses the Forth and Clyde Canal adjacent to The Helix and its Kelpies. It passes through open countryside as far as the city of Stirling.

=== Stirling to Inverkeithing ===
This section of the route follows the northern bank of the Firth of Forth. Tullibody Old Bridge and Cambus Iron Bridge, each a Category A listed building and scheduled monument, are on the route. After Alloa 76 passes Clackmannan, Kincardine and passes close to the site of the closed Longannet power station. A combination of river bank paths and roads takes the route east, following the Fife Coastal Path for much of the route. At the north end of the Forth Bridges NCN 76 passes under the M90 and joins NCN Route 1 to pass through Inverkeithing.

=== Inverkeithing to Kirkcaldy ===
Route 76 leaves Route 1 in Inverkeithing to follow the north bank of the Forth to Aberdour, Burntisland and Kinghorn. It then climbs inland before turning back towards the coast for a descent into Kirkcaldy. This section was originally part of National Cycle Network route 1 and was signed accordingly. Continuing north following NCN 766 via Glenrothes connects inland to NCN 1.

There are long term plans to extend the route to St Andrews.
