= Cramond Old Bridge =

Footbridge in Scotland

Cramond Old Bridge Cramond Brig
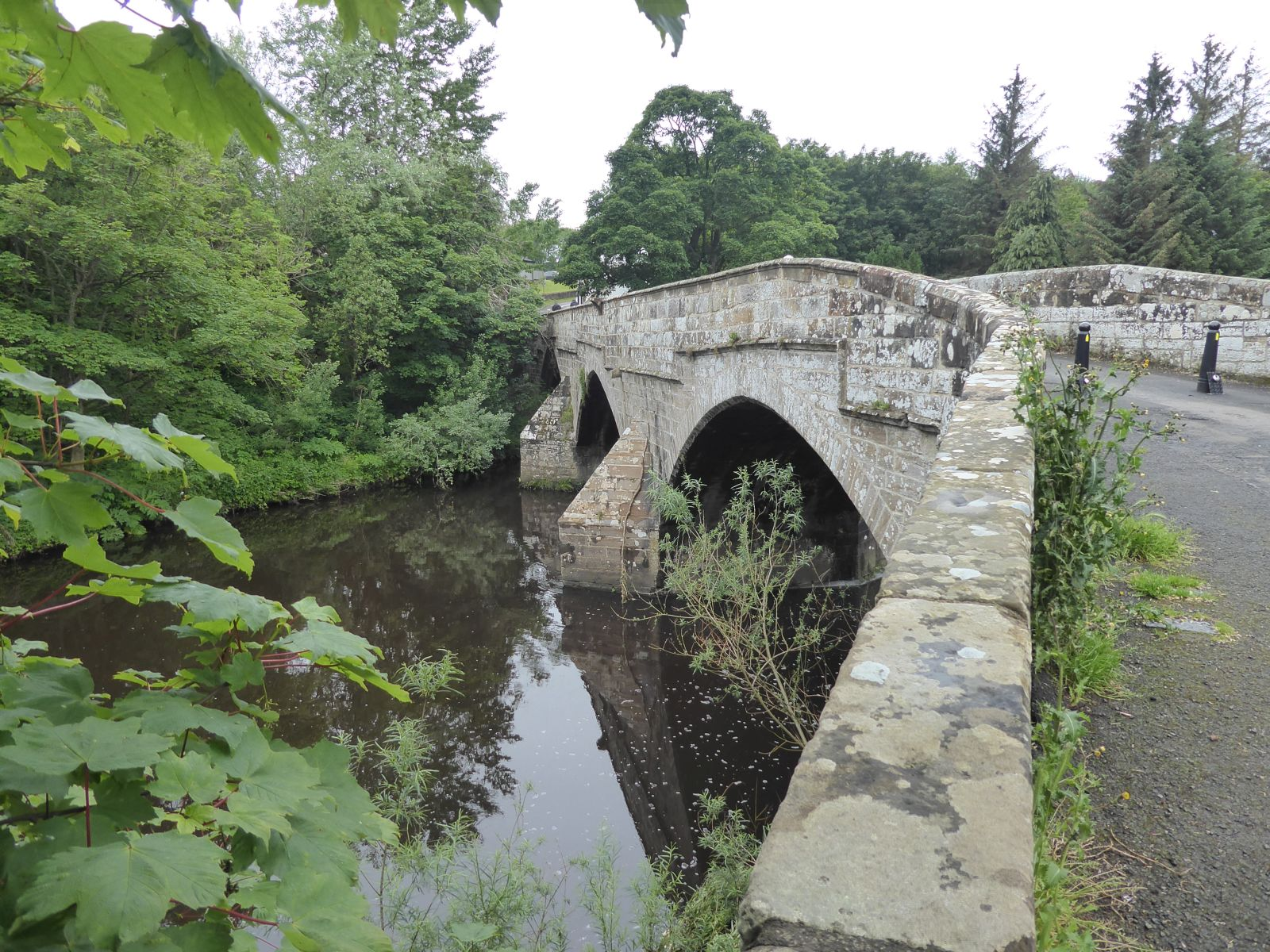
- Bridge crossing the River Almond
- Coordinates: 55.9652°N 3.3160°W
- Carries: 1; 76; John Muir Way
- Crosses: River Almond
- Preceded by: Cramond New Bridge

Characteristics
- No. of spans: 3

Listed Building – Category A
- Official name: Brae Park Road, Cramond Old Bridge
- Designated: 13 December 1970
- Reference no.: LB27940

Location
- Interactive map of Cramond Old Bridge

The Cramond Old Bridge is a bridge in Cramond, Edinburgh, Scotland that crosses the River Almond. The bridge carries the National Cycle Route 1, National Cycle Route 76 and the John Muir Way.

The bridge used to carry the A90 road but was superseded by the nearby Cramond New Bridge which now carries the road. It was designated a category A listed building in 1970.

== History ==
The original bridge was built in the 15th century. By the 16th century it was in disrepair and could not be used. A Scottish Act of Parliament was passed to rebuild the bridge. The bridge was rebuilt between 1617 and 1619. It has been repaired several time since then.

== Gallery ==
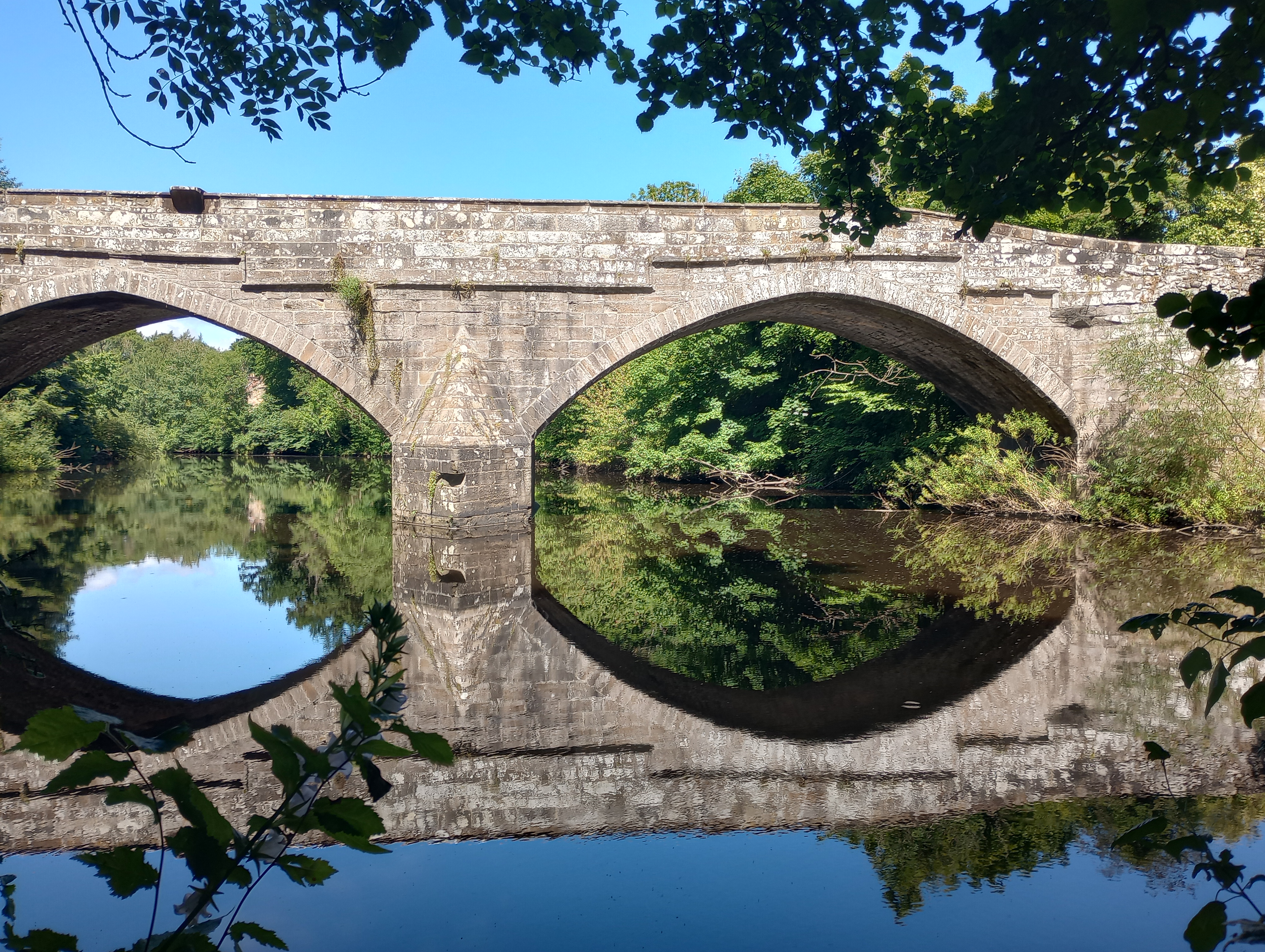

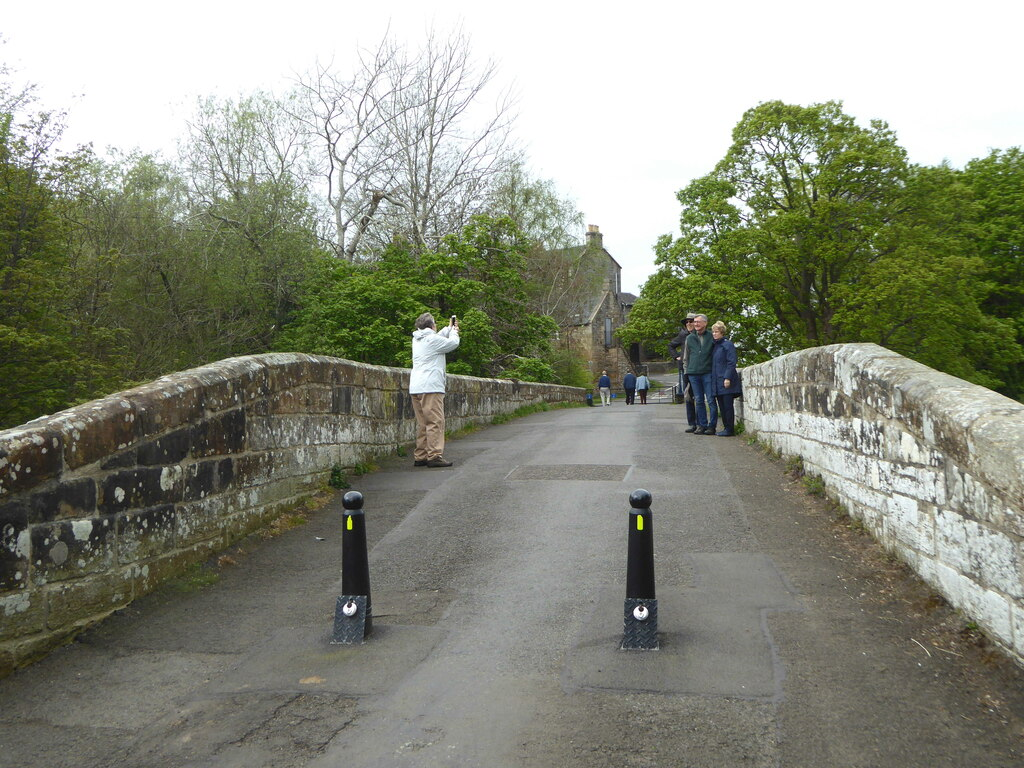

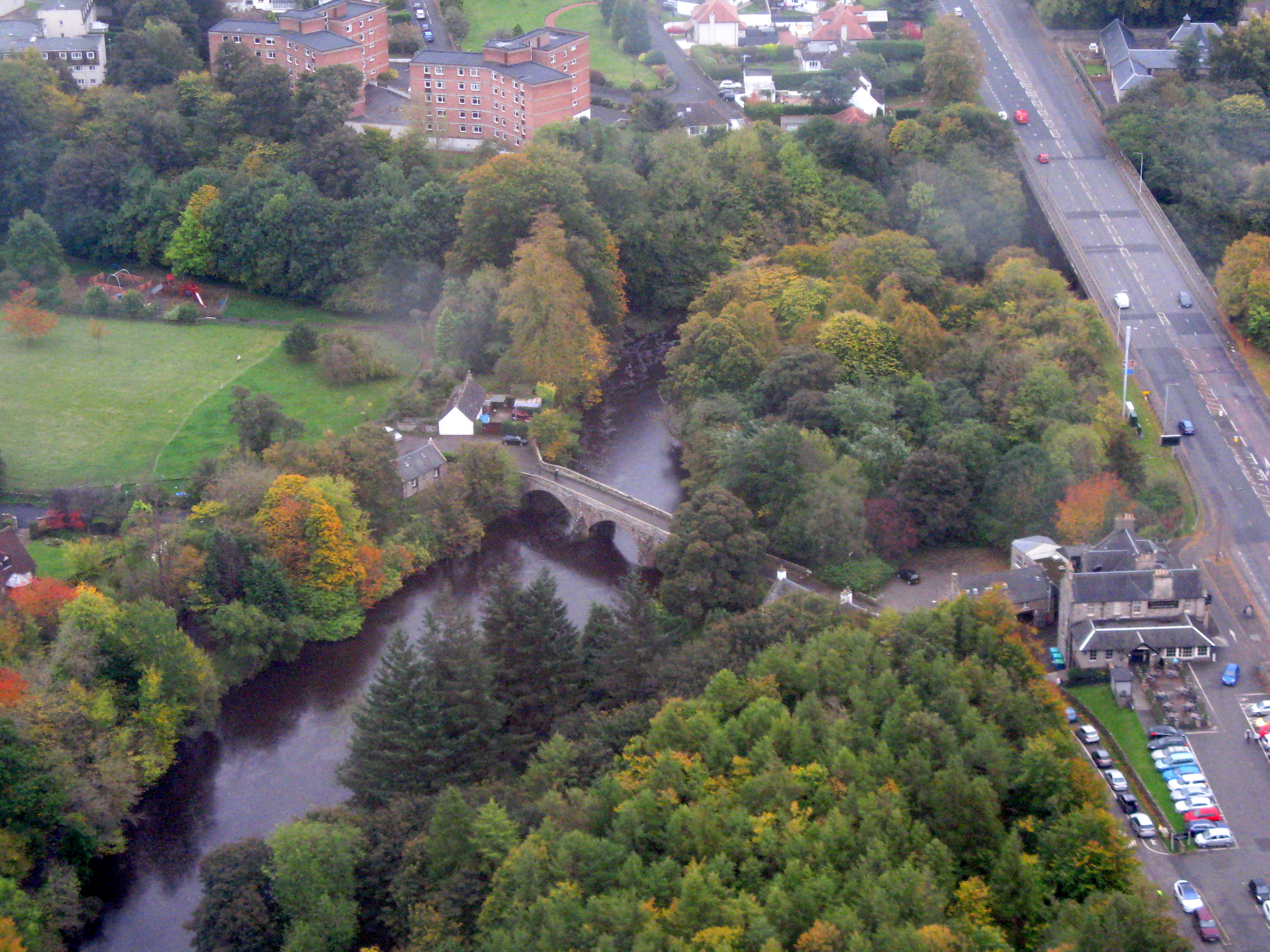

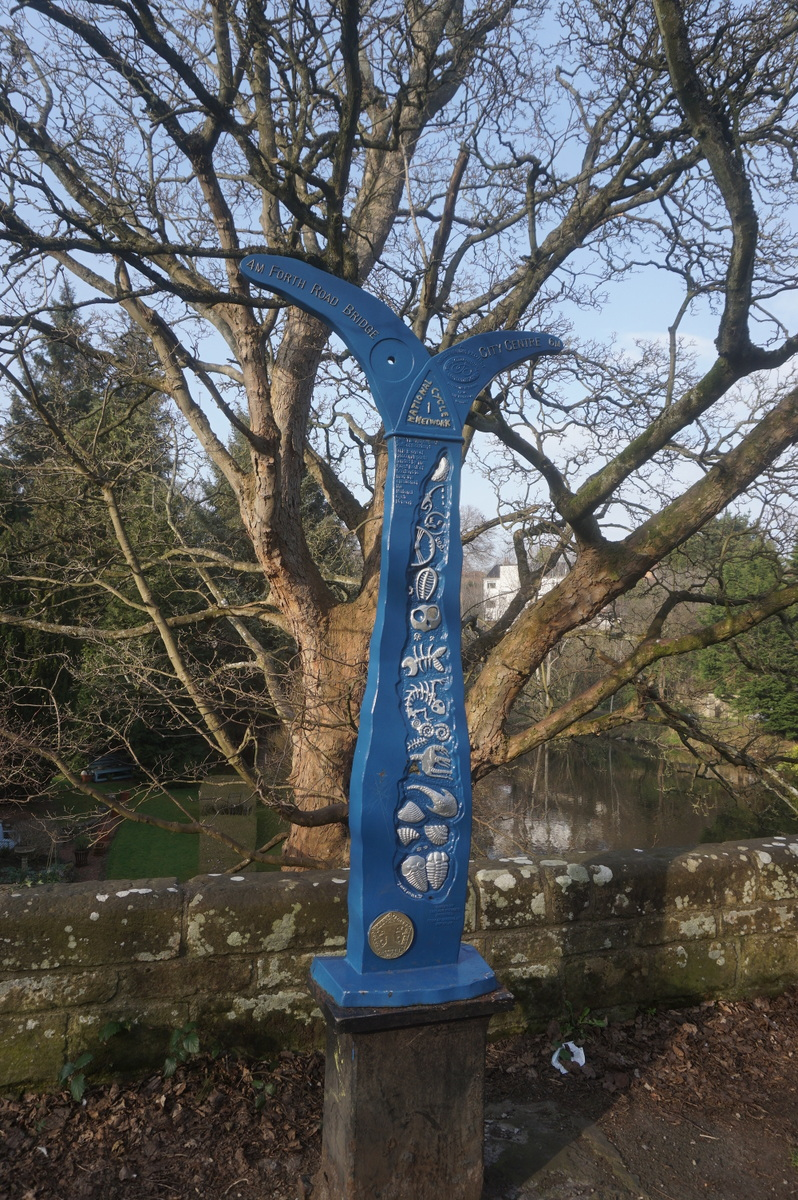
National Cycle Network signpost

== See also ==
- List of bridges in Scotland
