= Heron Trail =

Cycle route in England

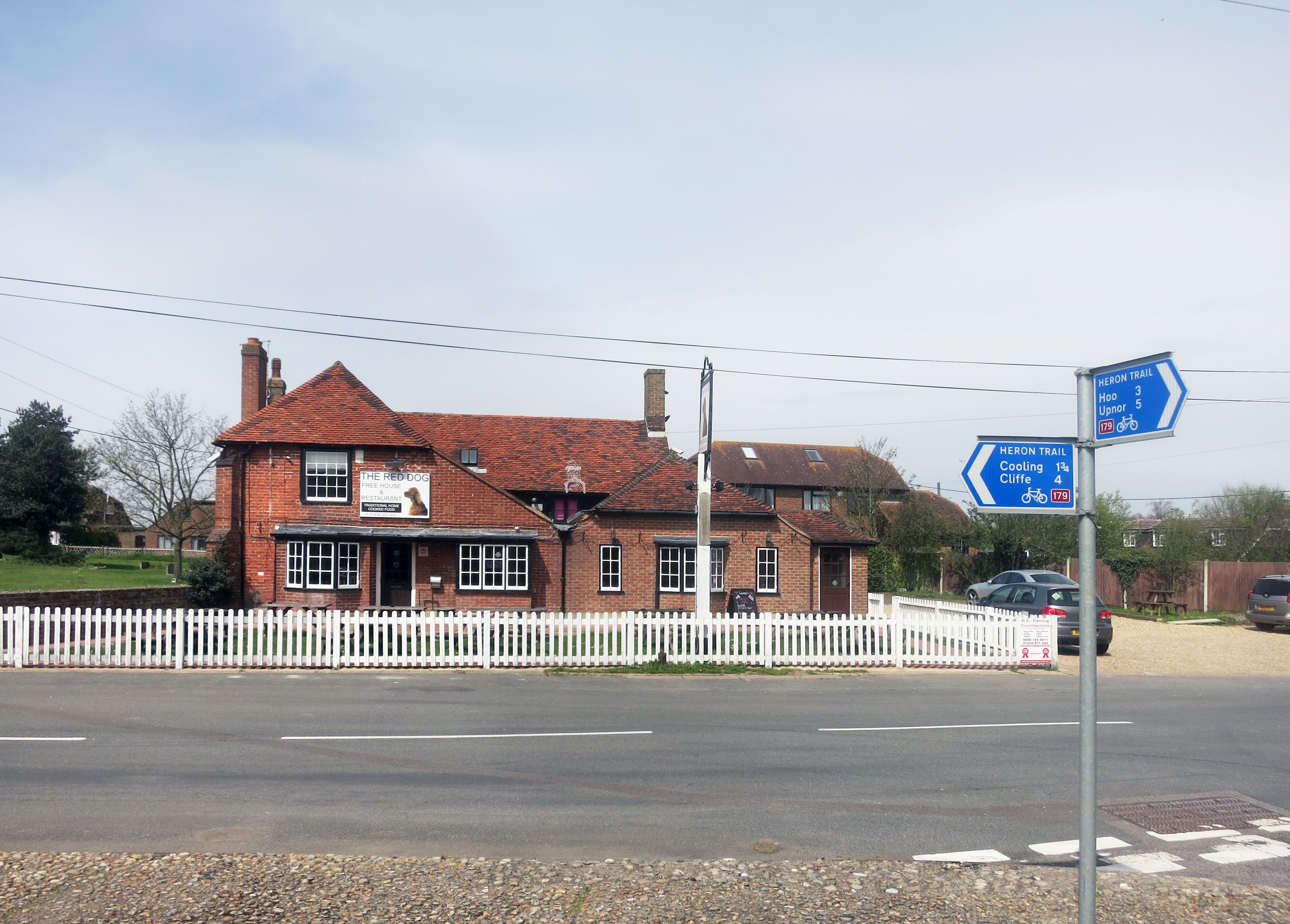
- At High Halstow
- Length: 15.5 mi (24.9 km)
- Location: Kent and Hoo Peninsula
- Designation: National Cycle Route 179
- Trailheads: Higham; 51.4288°N 0.4652°E Hoo St Werburgh; 51.4202°N 0.5633°E; High Halstow; 51.4483°N 0.5603°E Cliffe; 51.4483°N 0.5603°E
- Use: Cycling
- Months: All year

The Heron Trail is 15 1/2-mile (24.9 km) long cycling trail that links with National Cycle Route 1 between Higham and Strood, then it heads around the Hoo Peninsula via Regional route 18 (now renamed National Cycle Route 179 ) passing through 'Hoo St Werburgh', 'High Halstow' and 'Cliffe' before returning to Higham. It has a mixture of rural and maritime interest, with views of the River Medway and River Thames.

In 2005, the RSPB worked with Medway Council to establish the route on the Hoo Peninsula.

== Route ==
Starting points can be anywhere along the route, but Higham Railway Station is normally used. Then a clockwise route is taken.

The trail takes its name from the RSPB 'Northward Hill Reserve' in High Halstow, which the route passes by.

The trail heads down 'Lower Rochester Road', then down 'Two Gates Hill' to the crossroads hamlet of 'Mockbeggar'. It takes 'Bunter's Hill Road' to Noke Street, then 'Higham Road' before turning away from Wainscott and heading along 'Islingham Farm Road' and 'Woodfield Way' to Chattenden. Here it passes the Royal School of Military Engineering (RSME). It takes 'Upchat Road' to Beacon Hill. It crosses over the A228 'Four Elms Hill' before leaving 'National Cycle Route 1' and becoming Regional route 18 which heads up the A228 through another section of Chattenden.

It then takes 'Main Road Chattenden' to the village of Hoo St Werburgh. It then takes 'Stoke Road' towards Kingsnorth. But it then breaks left onto 'Roper's Lane' heading back towards the A228 (Ratcliffe Highway). It then takes 'Sharnal Street' towards the street lined hamlet, before crossing over the A228 to take 'Christmas Lane' to High Halstow.

After passing St Margaret church in High Halstow, the Heron trail takes 'Cooling Road' to Bromhey Farm (used by the RSPB). 'Then Lipwell Hill' to 'Main Road' leading to Cooling. It then passes 'Cooling Castle' and 'Cooling Castle Barn' and heads along 'Cooling Road' again. It then turns right onto 'Common Lane' to head to Cliffe.

It heads along 'Reed Street' in the village towards St Helen's church in Cliffe. Then it heads west via 'Buttway Lane', before turning left onto 'West Street' (confusingly heading North-south!) to 'Buckland Road'. Here it passes the large quarry works and then passes over the Gravesend to Grain railway (carrying freight only). Buckland Road carries on around the edge of Cliffe Woods village. Then it turns right onto 'Gore Green Road' to head to back to Higham.

== Notes ==
Easy (6 mph) - 2 hours 30 minutes*
Well (7-8 mph) - 2 hours*
Strong Plus+ (13-15 mph) - 1 hour*

- all times approximations.
