= Elmstone Church =

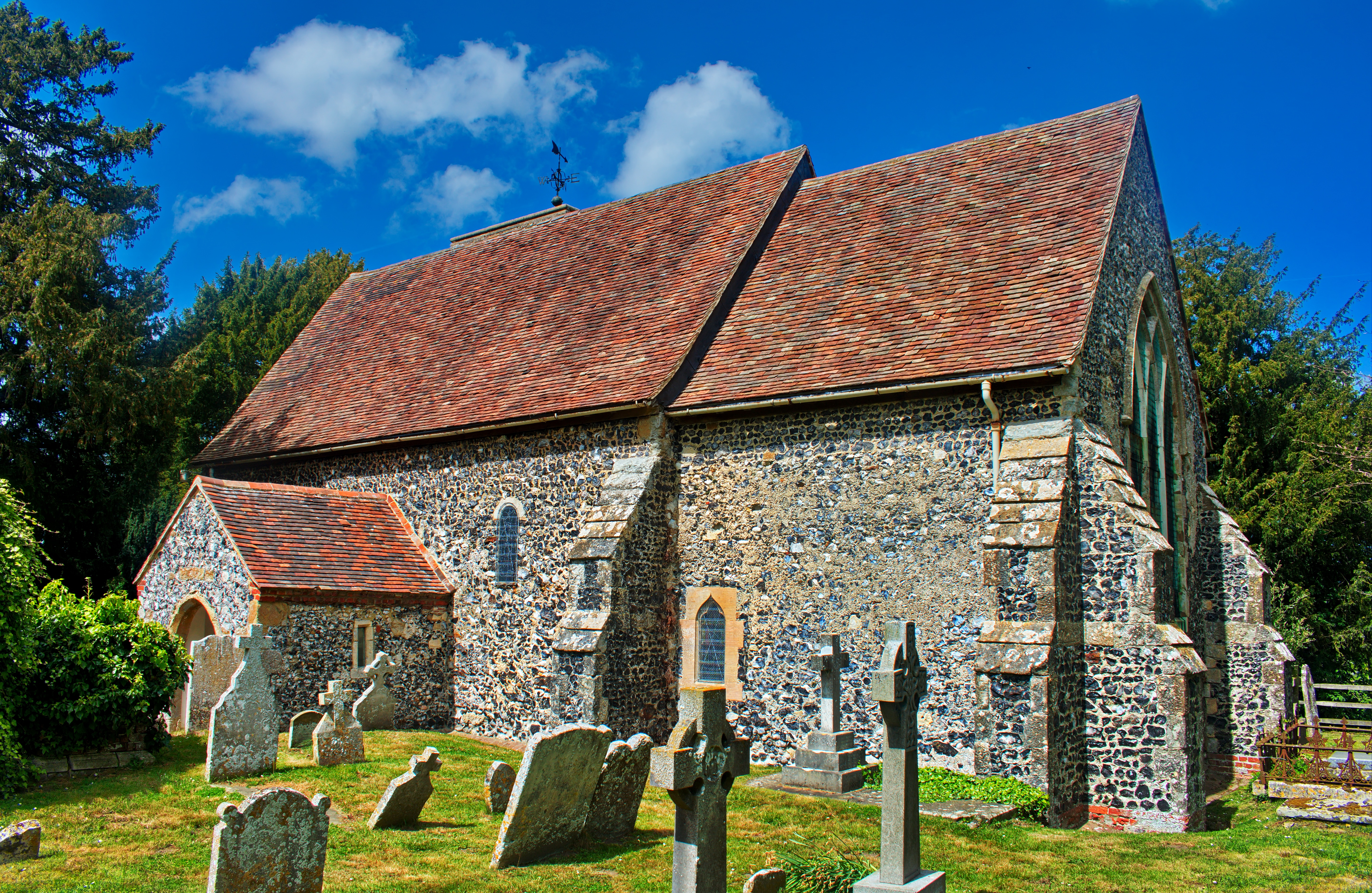
- South view of the church

- Location in Kent
- 51.296°N 1.242°E
- OS grid reference: TR 26149 60284
- Location: Elmstone, Kent
- Country: England
- Denomination: Anglican

History
- Status: Parish church

Architecture
- Functional status: Active
- Heritage designation: Grade II*
- Designated: 11 October 1963
- Architectural type: Church

Specifications
- Materials: Flint

Administration
- District: Dover
- Province: Canterbury
- Diocese: Canterbury
- Archdeaconry: Canterbury
- Deanery: East Bridge
- Parish: Elmstone with Preston and Stourmouth

Elmstone Church is an Anglican church in the village of Elmstone in Kent, England. The church dates back to the 13th century, and was designated a Grade II* listed building in 1963. Unusually for churches in the United Kingdom, Elmstone Church does not feature a dedication to any saint.

== History and architecture ==
The nave and lower chancel are from Norman times and are built out of flint. The chancel contains a north window and the nave contains two south windows; all three have Caen stone heads and sills, as well as jambs made of flint. Early 14th-century remodelling is visible in the Y-tracery of the west window, and in the three-light east window which contains intersecting tracery. There is also evidence of an early 14th-century enlargement, specifically the north aisle and the north-west tower, both being built out of squared knapped flint. The church also boasts square-headed windows with ogee lights. The porch is situated to the south. There is an arcade of three bays typical of the 13th century, with the west bay being shared by the tower. The piers are octagonal, and the arches are double-chamfered. The priest's stall is dated to the 14th century, and the pulpit is of a late 19th-century design by Edward Schroeder Prior, with linenfold panels reminiscent of Charles Voysey.

The church is not known to feature a dedication to any known saint, a rare occurrence for Anglican churches in the United Kingdom; the church is thereby titled as "Elmstone Church" for any official purposes.

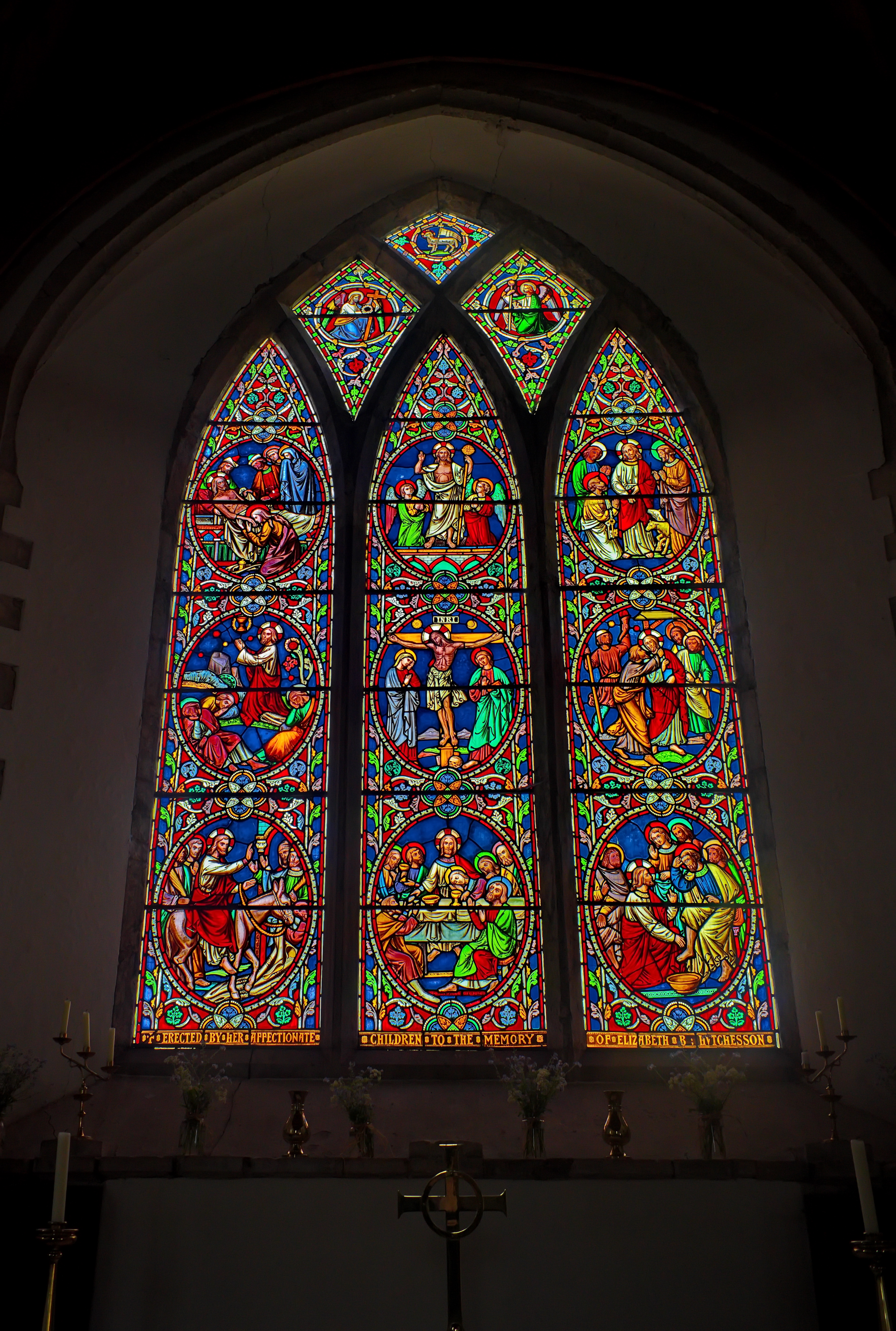
The east chancel window, depicting the Passion of Jesus

== Glass and windows ==
In the east of the chancel is a stained glass window consisting of the Passion of Jesus in 12th-century styled roundels. In the east of the north aisle is stained glass depicting the Resurrection of Jesus. Both windows were produced by William Wailes around 1863. In the west of the nave is stained glass depicting the church's armorial; the date is unknown, however architectural historian John Newman gives a probable date of production around 1840. The north aisle also contains a window by Burlison and Grylls, as well as a window depicting the Nativity by James Powell and Sons. A distorted depiction of 7th-century saints is present on a window in the south wall. The west window contains medieval glass, and the north chancel window contains a medieval roundel depiction of the Lamb of God.

== Furniture and monuments ==
The church possesses a font that is either 12th or 13th century, set on five shafts. There is a Bethersden marble bowl, being square below with a rounded top; the transition is made through anvil-shaped corner pieces. There are four poppyheads incorporated into the rector's stall.

A monument of Robert Jaques (died 1671) is attributable to Joshua Marshall, built in black and white marble into the south side of the chancel. At the top is a frontal bust, with draperies in an antique style.

== Bibliography ==
- Newman, John (2013). Kent: North East and East. Buildings of England. Harmondsworth: Yale University Press. ISBN 978-0-300-18506-5.
