= Preston-next-Wingham =

Village in Kent, England

Coordinates: 51.3040°N 1.2258°E

Preston
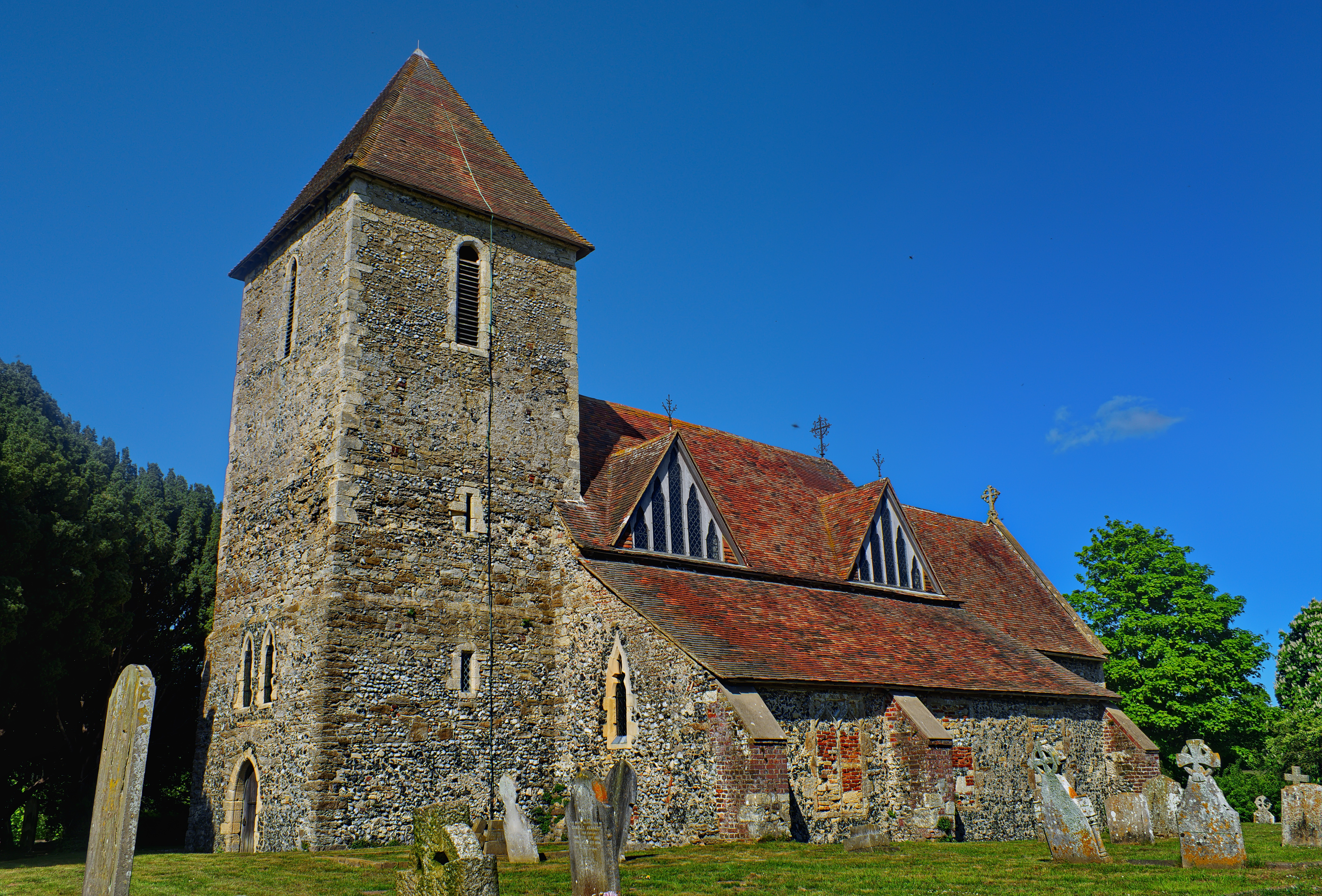
- St Mildred's Church, Preston

- Location within Kent
- Population: 674 (2011)
- OS grid reference: TR249610
- Civil parish: Preston
- District: Dover
- Shire county: Kent
- Region: South East
- Country: England
- Sovereign state: United Kingdom
- Post town: CANTERBURY
- Postcode district: CT3
- Dialling code: 01227
- Police: Kent
- Fire: Kent
- Ambulance: South East Coast
- UK Parliament: Herne Bay and Sandwich

Preston or Preston-next-Wingham is a civil parish and village in the valley of the Little Stour in the Dover District of Kent, England. The village is on the B2076 secondary road. The parish includes the hamlet of Elmstone. The main river through the area is a tributary of the River Stour. The suffix 'next-Wingham' distinguishes the area from Preston-next-Faversham.

The Domesday Book of 1086 chronicled Preston as 'Prestetune'. In the 1870s, Preston-next-Wingham was described as:

"A village and a parish in Eastry district, Kent. The village stands on a rising-ground, above the marshes of the Little Stour river, 1½mile S E of Grove-Ferry r. station, and 6¾ E N E of Canterbury; bears the name of Preston-street, and has a postal pillar-box under Wingham".

== Amenities ==
Preston is 10 miles east of Canterbury, and a mile south of the Stodmarsh National Nature Reserve. The village houses are fairly scattered. It retains a primary school, a local pub, a butchers, a village shop, a livery yard and a garden nursery with a restaurant inside. It used to hold an annual steam rally and ploughing matches at Preston Court, which attracted people from all across the Kent area. The village has two neighbouring churches, St Mildred's Church and Elmstone Church (which unusually has no saint's dedication); both are 0.7 miles away.

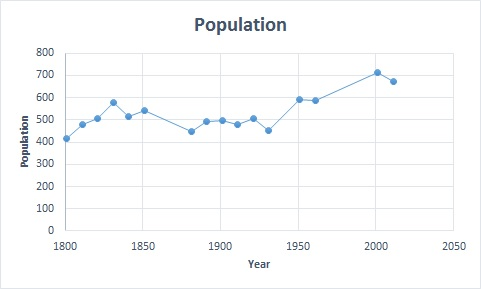
Preston's population from 1881 to 2011

== History ==
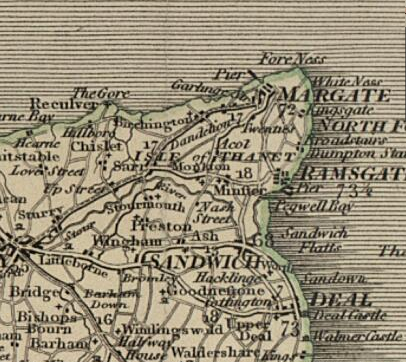
Map of the area around Preston, 1806

Archaeological digs date the parish back to the Bronze Age and Iron Age. In the Domesday Book, Preston is recorded as having about 60 households, which was quite a sizeable number in relation to the British Isles population at the time. The Manor of Wingham was in the year 836 was given to Christ Church by Æthelstan of Kent, who was the local king. This manor was made up of the parishes of Ash, Goodnestone, Wingham, and parts of Womenswold and Nonington. In the Domesday Book it was recorded as 'Wingehame'. Christ Church lost a few of its holdings during the Anglo-Saxon Heptarchy in the 9th and 10th centuries, Restitution was made when King Edmund I unified England and the Church of England.

St Mildred's was founded in 700 AD, and it still has evidence of stonework from the Saxon age, similarly to Elmstone Church. St Mildred's Church dates back to the early 13th century and was extended a year later. It was also restored in 1857 by a Gothic Revival architect called William White, who put in dormer windows to replace the aisle ones. It holds a rare Parochial library which was assembled in 1710, and was furnished with 67 volumes recommended by Thomas Bray. These books were transported in a case of 'the best seasoned oak' with sturdy carrying handles. Normally, the cases were left unpainted after arrival, but the Preston case was painted white; nowadays however it looks more grey.

It is a Grade I listed building and in 1800, Edward Hasted described it as:

‘three isles, a high chancel, and a north chancel, having at the west end a low pointed steeple, in which hang five bells. It is kept exceedingly neat and handsome, and the whole of it ceiled’

The name 'Preston' means 'Farm/settlement of the priests'. This comes from the two old English terms that make up the name; prēost and tūn, which mean priest and farmland/estate respectfully. It was originally known by the name of its main manor house, Coppanstan. In the 9th century, the Archbishop of Canterbury came into possession of the house, which is where the old English name comes from.

The area has 44 listed buildings, including a number of cottages, farmhouses and even some garden walls.

The area of Preston grew between 1831 and 1961, from 1,670 acres to 2,028 acres over the respective period.

Occupations in Preston, 1881

== Social structure ==
The 1831 census that took occupation into consideration split Preston into 13 employers and professionals, 28 middling sorts, 99 labourers and servants and 0 others. The people who lived in Preston developed houses over the years; there were 108 houses in 1831, increasing to 210 by 1961. According to the 2011 census, there were 336 males and 338 females living in the parish. The population of the area fluctuated a lot, but now the village has 275 households. The 70 mixed units of the newly built Preston Grange were added in 2016.

== Public transport ==
Getting to and from Preston by public transport requires the use of a bus or coach. There is a bus stop next to the Preston village shop, with several additional stops along The Street, the name of the road that runs through Preston village. The closest railway station is at Adisham, roughly 6 miles away.
