= Elmstone =

Coordinates: 51.295°N 1.245°E

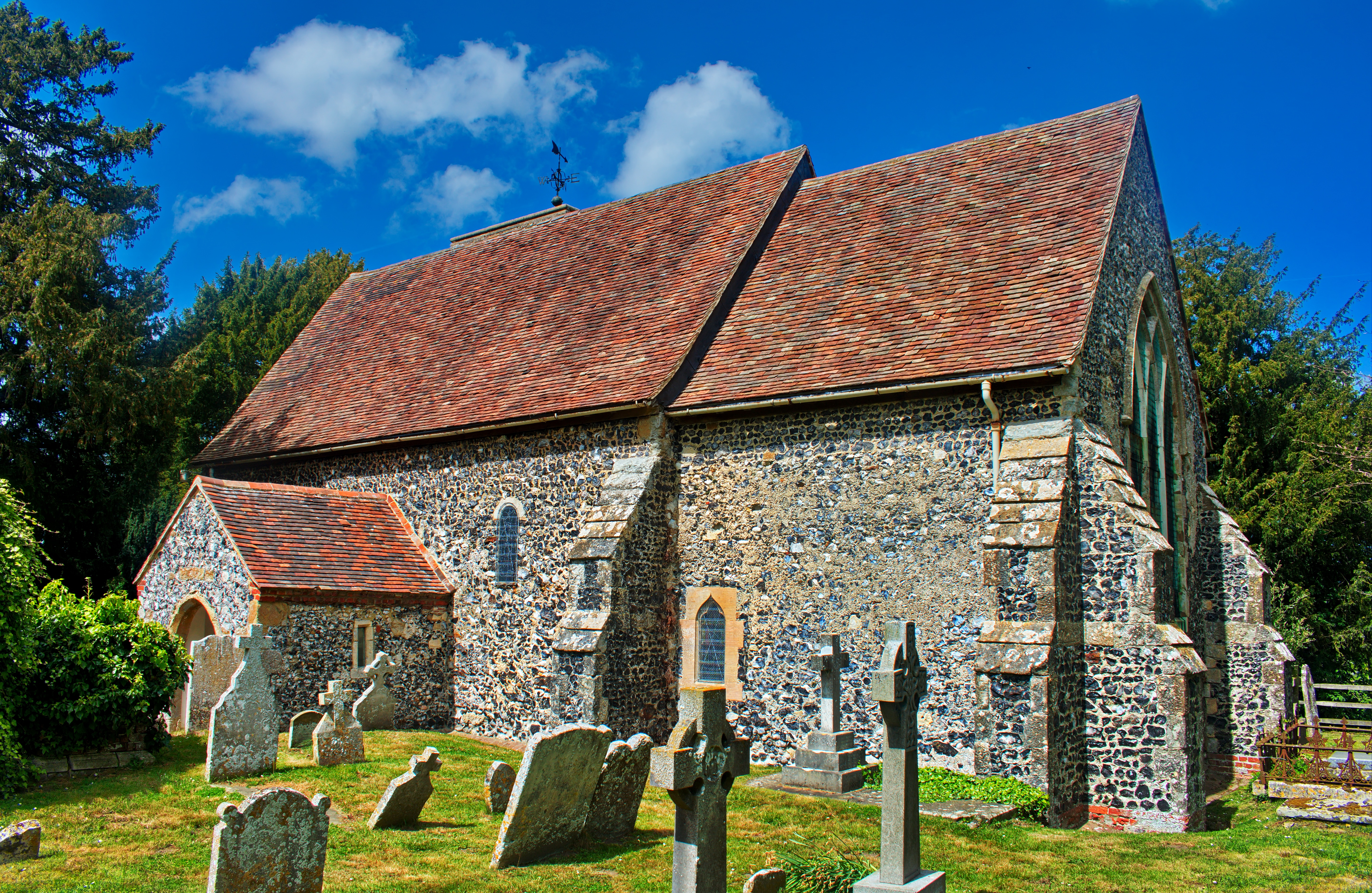
- Elmstone Church

- Location within Kent
- Civil parish: Preston
- District: Dover
- Shire county: Kent
- Region: South East
- Country: England
- Sovereign state: United Kingdom
- Post town: Canterbury
- Postcode district: CT3
- Police: Kent
- Fire: Kent
- Ambulance: South East Coast

Elmstone is a village and former civil parish, now in the parish of Preston, in the Dover district, in East Kent, England. It is situated between Canterbury and Sandwich. The Domesday Book of 1086 records Elmstone as 'Aelvetone'. In 1086 the recorded population was 3 households. In 1931 the parish had a population of 117. On 1 April 1935 the parish was abolished and merged with Preston, part also went to Wingham.

The village is surrounded by farmland mostly laid to apple and pear orchards. Some local farms have been sold and are no longer used for agriculture.

Elmstone Church, a small 13th-century Anglican church can be found in the village; unusually, the church does not have a dedicated saint. The church, in the Canonry Benefice of Canterbury diocese, shares a vicar with the villages of Ash, Chillenden, Goodnestone, Nonington, Preston and Stourmouth.

Elmstone recorded the lowest temperature (−21.3 °C (−6.3 °F) during the Winter of 1946–1947.

== Notable buildings ==
Notable buildings within the hamlet are the early Victorian Old Rectory, the early eighteenth century Grade Two listed Old Vicarage and the Grade Two listed Georgian country house Elmstone Court.

== Community ==
Apart from mains water, mains drains and electricity there are no services, i.e., no shops, restaurants, pubs, public transport or street lights. The public telephone is now used as a book exchange. The nearest bus stop is in the village of Preston.
