= National Cycle Route 16 =

Cycle route in the United Kingdom

National Cycle Route 16, part of the National Cycle Network, connects Bishop's Stortford, Hertfordshire to Southend-on-Sea, Essex.

== Route ==
=== Bishop's Stortford to Shoeburyness ===
Bishop Stortford | Little Dunmow | Braintree | Basildon | Southend-on-Sea | Shoeburyness

This route is still under development.

== See also ==
details of Braintree to Little Dunmow section

details of Basildon to Shoeburyness section
