= Station usage in Northumberland =

This is a list of National Rail stations in the ceremonial county of Northumberland, England, with estimated usage figures gathered from data collected by the Office of Rail and Road (ORR). As of February 2023, there are 17 stations located along two lines in Northumberland, from which around 2.08 million passenger journeys were made from April 2021–March 2022. Both lines (the north–south East Coast Main Line and the east–west Tyne Valley Line) run perpendicular to each other and meet at Newcastle, with some services going from one line to the other.

Within the historic county of Northumberland are two additional stations not within the ceremonial county: Newcastle and Manors, both in Newcastle upon Tyne in Tyne and Wear. Newcastle had 7,040,072 journeys for '21–'22 whilst Manors had 14,420. The Tyne and Wear Metro also serves the historic county, having 19 stations within Newcastle and another 17 in North Tyneside.

Another five railway stations are under construction to be opened in December 2023 with the Northumberland Line: Ashington, Bedlington, Blyth Bebside, Newsham, and Seaton Delaval. As well, in the historic county, the Northumberland Park Metro station in North Tyneside will be converted into a railway interchange. Northern Trains will manage all of the new stations and be their exclusive operator.

There are also a number of heritage railway stations across the county, whose main purpose is tourism rather than transport. These are on the Aln Valley Railway, the Heatherslaw Light Railway, the South Tynedale Railway, and the Woodhorn Narrow Gauge Railway, as well as the North Tyneside Steam Railway in North Tyneside.

Railway station usage in Northumberland
Station	Constituency	Rank	Managed by	Operator(s)	Line	Journey(s) 2021-22	Journey(s) 2020-21	Journey(s) 2019-20	Journey(s) 2018–19	Journey(s) 2017–18	Journey(s) 2016–17	Journey(s) 2015–16
Berwick-upon-Tweed	Berwick-upon-Tweed	1	LNER	LNER, CrossCountry, TPE	ECML	589,666	142,290	602,484	571,130	568,326	539,778	528,998
Morpeth	Wansbeck	2	Northern	Northern, CrossCountry, LNER, Lumo, TPE	ECML	402,772	82,468	506,574	474,998	418,410	382,280	357,154
Hexham	Hexham	3	Northern	Northern	Tyne Valley	286,802	80,300	372,090	342,808	345,784	344,264	331,866
Alnmouth	Berwick-upon-Tweed	4	Northern	Northern (infrequent), CrossCountry, LNER, TPE	ECML	285,882	61,222	344,862	344,602	339,814	312,452	294,042
Prudhoe	Hexham	5	Northern	Northern	Tyne Valley	114,066	32,754	159,668	140,394	147,230	155,336	154,218
Cramlington	Blyth Valley	6	Northern	Northern	ECML	111,440	21,308	136,534	107,800	98,928	94,544	92,316
Wylam	Hexham	7	Northern	Northern	Tyne Valley	75,666	22,616	107,854	97,642	104,306	107,964	105,572
Haltwhistle	Hexham	8	Northern	Northern	Tyne Valley	68,360	21,922	81,244	70,458	69,966	71,738	69,618
Corbridge	Hexham	9	Northern	Northern	Tyne Valley	46,692	10,364	62,552	54,384	54,170	53,972	52,676
Haydon Bridge	Hexham	10	Northern	Northern	Tyne Valley	35,834	13,608	46,438	37,504	30,554	32,802	31,976
Stocksfield	Hexham	11	Northern	Northern	Tyne Valley	33,298	9,508	59,352	59,380	56,676	59,770	53,654
Riding Mill	Hexham	12	Northern	Northern	Tyne Valley	19,582	6,316	32,532	26,688	25,434	28,376	27,986
Bardon Mill	Hexham	13	Northern	Northern	Tyne Valley	7,490	2,228	10,306	9,394	10,482	11,284	9,880
Widdrington	Berwick-upon-Tweed	14	Northern	Northern (infrequent)	ECML	2,038	696	3,636	4,180	3,574	3,346	3,408
Pegswood	Wansbeck	15	Northern	Northern (infrequent)	ECML	1,560	472	1,830	2,364	1,670	1,114	2,574
Chathill	Berwick-upon-Tweed	16	Northern	Northern (infrequent)	ECML	1,492	892	2,840	2,546	2,162	2,768	2,574
Acklington	Berwick-upon-Tweed	17	Northern	Northern (infrequent)	ECML	324	66	246	320	372	204	296

== See also ==
- List of busiest railway stations in Great Britain
- Station usage in Tyne and Wear
