= Newton, Northumberland =

Village in Northumberland, England

Coordinates: 54.975°N 1.948°W

Newton
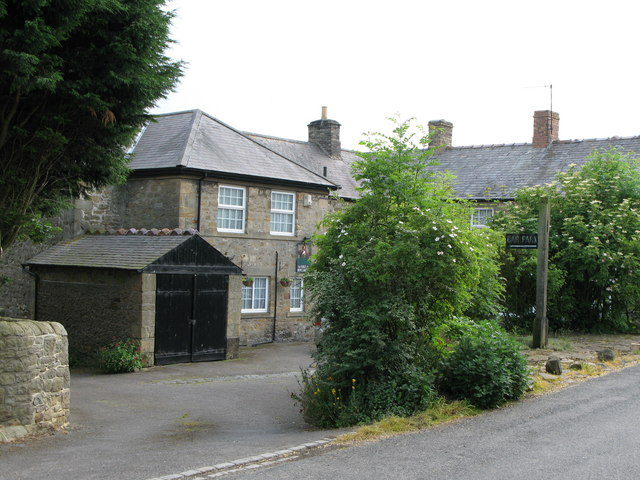
- The Duke of Wellington public house

- Location within Northumberland
- OS grid reference: NZ 0345 6448
- Civil parish: Bywell
- Unitary authority: Northumberland
- Ceremonial county: Northumberland
- Region: North East
- Country: England
- Sovereign state: United Kingdom
- Post town: STOCKSFIELD
- Postcode district: NE43
- Dialling code: 01661
- Police: Northumbria
- Fire: Northumberland
- Ambulance: North East
- UK Parliament: Hexham

Newton is a village and former civil parish, now the parish of Bywell, in Northumberland, England. It is situated close to the A69 road, 3 miles (5 km) north of Stocksfield and 13 miles (21 km) west of Newcastle upon Tyne. In 1951 the parish had a population of 78. Bywell parish has a population of around 450 and Newton is its most populous settlement. Newton, Newton Hall and Stelling were three separate civil parishes from 1866 to 1 April 1955, when they were merged into the existing Bywell civil parish.

== Newton village ==
Beaumont arms

The ancient township of Newton in the 13th century was made up of a collection of small tenements which were owned by the Balliols of Bywell. In 1426, rents were four shillings a year for a cottage and a garden. The lands became the property of the Crown in the 17th century. They were sold in turn to the Fenwicks of Bywell, Joseph Bainbridge of Newcastle and in 1842 to the railway engineer William Hedley of Wylam. The estate was purchased in 1952 by the trustees of Viscount Allendale's estates for the sum of £80,000.

In the 20th century, the village had a Methodist chapel at its west end, the Women's Institute hall at its east end, and an agricultural engineering works. John and James Symm manufactured farm implements, and exported as far afield as Australia and South America. There were two farms in the village; both Town Farm and South Farm were converted to residential use by the end of the century.

Today, Newton has a village hall which operates as a registered charity, the "Newton & Bywell Community Hall Trust". The Duke of Wellington public house provides accommodation in the centre of the village. There is a regular bus service to Hexham and Newcastle from Shaw House on the A69, provided by Go North East and Arriva. The nearest railway station is at Stocksfield on the Tyne Valley line.

== Newton Hall ==
Newton Hall is located some 800 metres to the north east of Newton. The Hall complex once incorporated the remains of Newton Hall Tower, a 13th-century defensive tower belonging to the de Insula family, that was demolished in the 1800s. Newton Hall country house was built for Robert Jobling in 1811, and was modified in 1835 by the architect John Dobson. The estate was later purchased by the Joicey family who owned a number of collieries in County Durham.

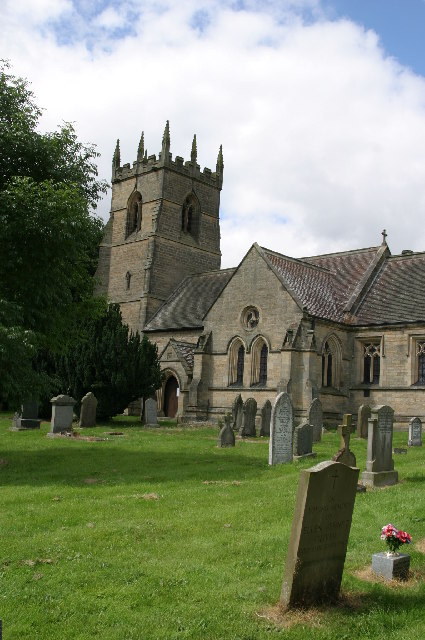
St James' Church

St James' Church, formerly a chapel of ease to Bywell St Peter, was rebuilt in 1874 for the politician John Joicey. The church is a grade II listed building. The ecclesiastical parish of Newton Hall St James was formed in 1877, comprising the townships of Newton, Newton Hall and Stelling. In 1874 a village school was built within the estate, which existed until the 1940s when numbers of children had greatly diminished.

The Hunday Tractor Museum was located at Westside Farm. It was opened by Queen Elizabeth The Queen Mother in 1979, and won the Museum of the Year award in 1981. An art gallery opened in 2003 on the same site.

Mowden Hall School is a private preparatory school for children aged 3–13. It acquired its present site at Newton Hall in 1945. The school is part of the Cothill Trust, an educational charity with seven schools in England and France.

Newton Cricket Club competes in the West Tyne Senior Cricket League. It is one of the longest-established cricket teams in the country and plays its home matches at Mowden School.

== Stelling ==
Rowland Hinde held Stelling as lessee under the Monastery of Hexham in 1539, and Henry Hinde purchased the estate in 1626. In 1836 Elizabeth Archer-Hinde bequeathed the property to the politician John Hodgson-Hinde, on condition of his assuming the name of "Hinde". Stelling Hall was rebuilt in 1870 and was the residence of Mark Fenwick, esq. In 1891 the estate extended to 318 acres and had a population of 53.

The hall became part of the National Children's Home in 1954, and has since been converted into luxury properties.

== Photographs of Newton ==
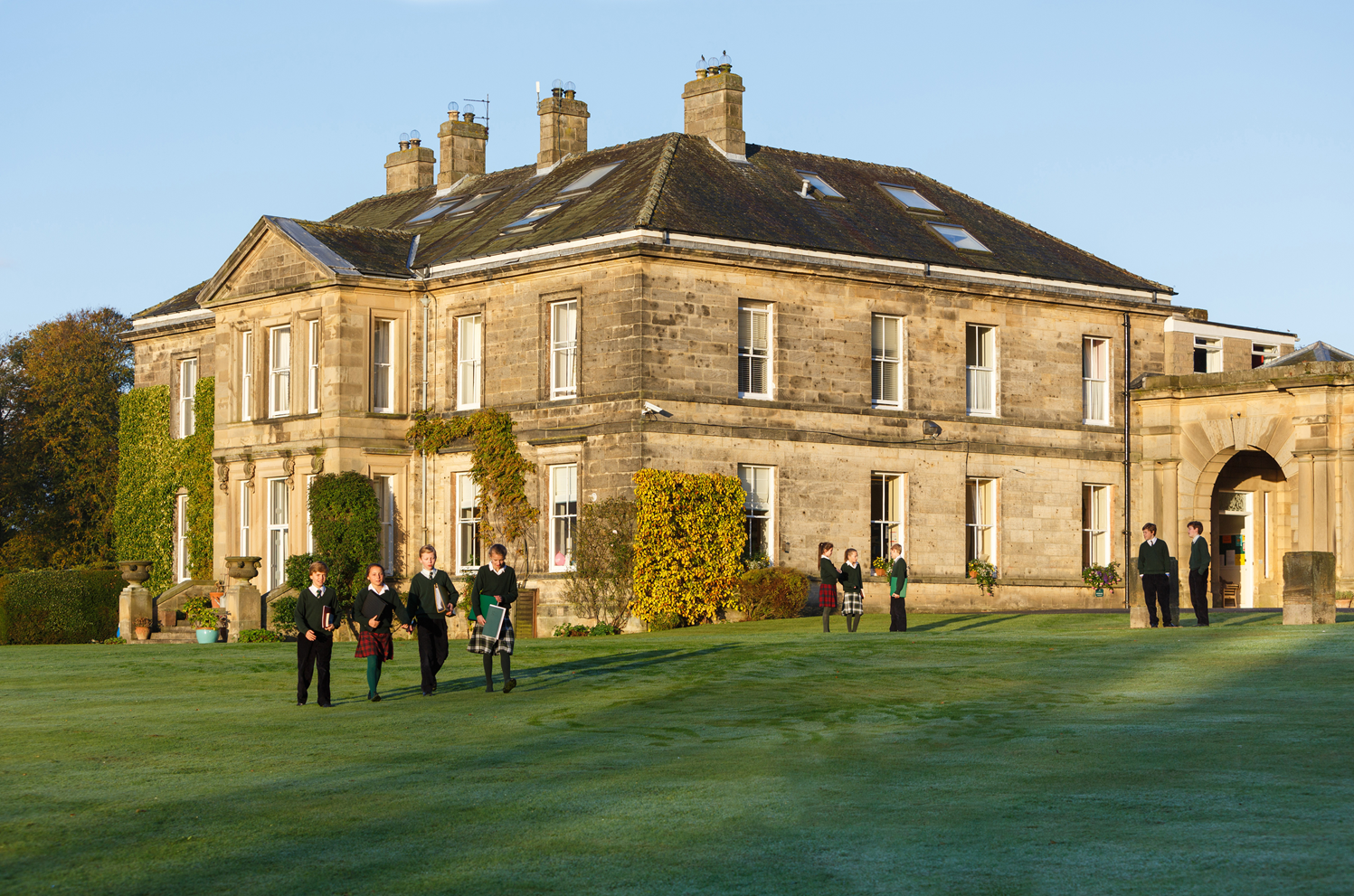
Mowden Hall School

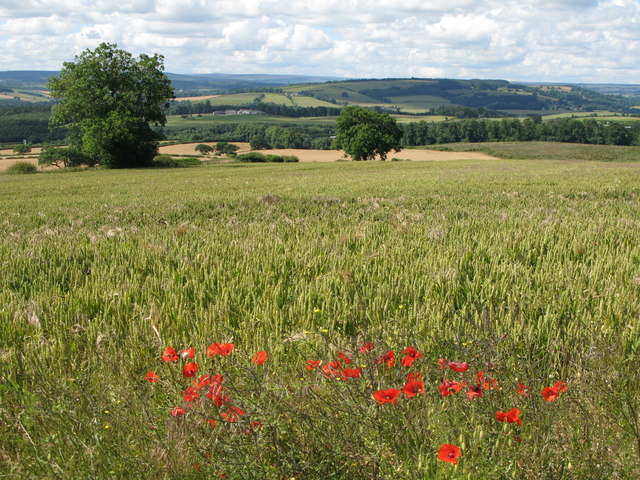
Arable land near Newton

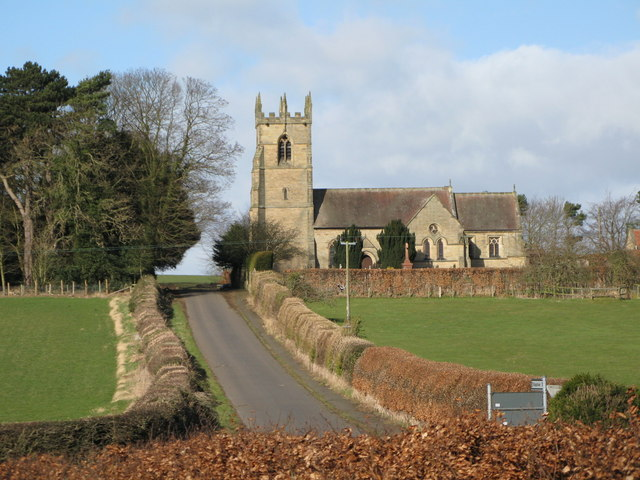
St James' Church

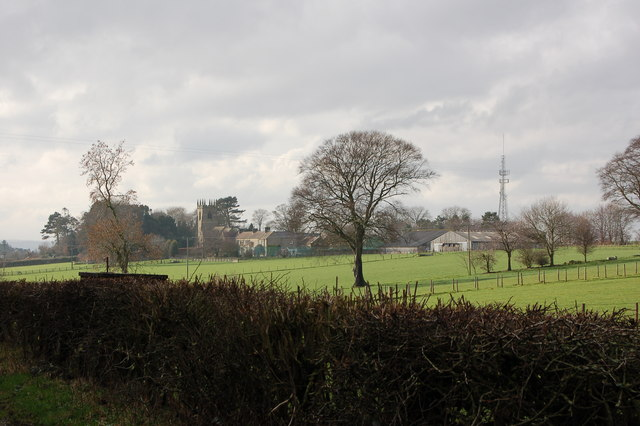
Newton Hall
