= Hindley, Northumberland =

Hamlet in Northumberland, England

Coordinates: 54.927°N 1.925°W

Hindley
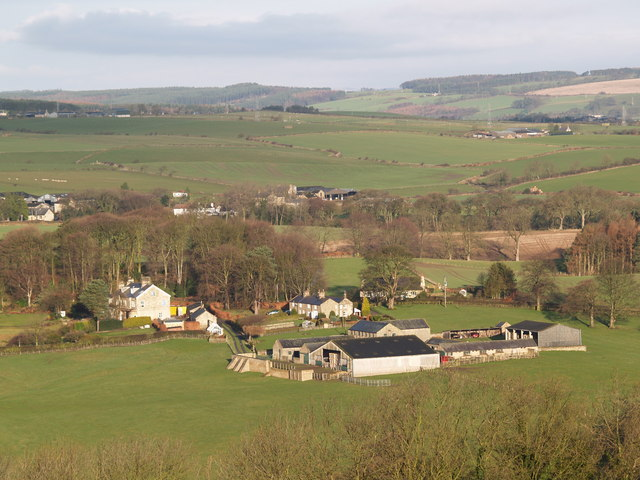
- Hindley

- Location within Northumberland
- OS grid reference: NZ0459
- Civil parish: Stocksfield
- Unitary authority: Northumberland
- Ceremonial county: Northumberland
- Region: North East
- Country: England
- Sovereign state: United Kingdom
- Post town: Stocksfield
- Postcode district: NE43
- Dialling code: 01661
- Police: Northumbria
- Fire: Northumberland
- Ambulance: North East
- UK Parliament: Hexham

Hindley is a small hamlet, comprising around 20 residences. It is in the parish of Stocksfield and is just to the south of Stocksfield in Northumberland with Broomley to the west and Whittonstall to the east. It is south of the River Tyne. Hindley is composed of a large house, Hindley Hall (now split up into three houses and four flats), a farm (now converted into residences) and a post box.

== History ==
Hindley is likely to have developed from a farm due to its close proximity to Dere Street (a Roman road between York and into Scotland, passing through nearby Corbridge). Local records have that in 1296 there were two poll-tax payers, a Shepard and a Smith.

The first dated reference to Hindley is dated 25 April 1232, and is an agreement between Sir William de Hindley and Robert de St. Jerman regarding land near Midhope.

In 1256 at the Northumberland Assizes, Hindley is mentioned again in reference to the death of a woman, and the Vills of Hindley were presented for not pursuing marauders after the robbing of someone's house. The land at Hindley has passed through several local families, Boutflower, Ridley, Surtees, and it is clear that there has never been large settlement in Hindley, from Parish records, which began in 1663.

It is not known how Hindley passed into the possession of Mr. Edward Montagu of Denton and of Allerthorpe in Yorkshire (grandson of 2nd Earl of Sandwich, although it is possible he acquired the land through the will of John Rogers. It was sold by his widow, Mrs. Elizabeth Montagu, the famous 'blue stocking', on 12 May 1787, to George Potts of Netherton, in Bedlingtonshire, who by his will, dated 29 November 1797, gave it to his only son, Matthew Potts. At this time Hindley was regarded to be in the Township of Old Ridley.

The 1841 census indicates two families living in Hindley. George Angus, a farmer with four agricultural workers and three female servants, living with his family, presumably in the farmhouse. Hindley Farmhouse was used for Baptist meetings for 150 years until 1863, when it burnt down. Also mentioned in the census is John Surtees, a surgeon, living with his family of four children. John Surtees is related to the famous R. S. Surtees, author of the Jorrocks Stories.

In 1849 the Hindley Estate consisting of 366 acres of land, 30 of which were woodland, was sold at auction. Mr John Featherstone Ayton bought the land at Hindley for £5050, being the only bidder. He occupied the estate, living in Hindley Cottage, presumably overseeing the building of Hindley Hall. In 1861 the Hall was finished and Ayton lived there with his wife Ann Maria, both aged 43, with their seven children (six sons and one daughter), and they had five servants. Three of Ayton's sons were being schooled in Germany at the time, and the enumerator had "crossed out the three names" and they were therefore not listed in the census returns. Mr Ayton wrote to the Home Office to protest at the enumerator's action, arguing that "the three boys really form part of the population of The United Kingdom". The Home Office, however, concluded that "the Enumerator was quite right".

In 1874 William Foster bought the Hall for £19,000 and considerably enlarged the Hall. By the 1881 Census, Mary Foster, a widow, lived in the Hall with her son Alfred J. Foster, aged 17, and two servants. The census also shows William Forster Fairbridge (or Farbridge) his wife Jane and ten children living in Hindley Lodge (now called Northwood Lodge). The estate, still 366 acres (1.48 km^{2}) was valued at £13,500 in 1889. The farmhouse, valued separately "as it is really too good for the farm", was valued at £800. This building is probably Hindley House.

In 1947 the hall was sold to Gateshead Corporation and, by 1953, 26 acres of land had also been purchased. The corporation intended to use the building as a residential school for around 60 pupils. The East wing (now the apartments) and a gym were built in the 1950s and 1960s using stone hauled from the ruined Ravensworth Castle (once owned by the Liddell Family). Accommodation for two assistant masters was built and a bungalow for the Headmaster had been built in 1958, although this no longer stands. A greenhouse was erected and a kitchen garden was provided to train pupils. A very high proportion of pupils had been before magistrates, and the purpose of the school was to sort out absenteeism and petty crime by pupils. It is clear that the school was a success and stream of visitors came for training and work experience. In 1991 the school closed and then, in 1993, the Corporation sold the 26 acres (11 ha).

The hamlet now comprises mainly residential properties, with the hall having been split up into private residences. In 2010–11 the then disused farm buildings were converted into four residences.

== Toponymy ==
The name Hindley could be derived from a number of sources. In R. Heslop's Northumbrian Words he suggests the 'Hindberry' (or raspberry), this is quite likely to be the root as other local names also have their names derived from plants; Broomley and Slaley. An alternative explanation could be that it is derived from 'Hind' (a female Red Deer) relating to the deer found in the area.

== Geography ==
Hindley is situated in the Tyne Valley, roughly fifteen miles west of Newcastle and situated between Hexham and Prudhoe. Nearby are the villages of Stocksfield, Broomley, Bywell, New Ridley and Riding Mill. To the north of Hindley runs a burn called Hindley Burn, this is a tributary of the River Tyne.

== Economy ==
Gainford Design is a graphic design company based in Hindley Hall. Two miles north of Hindley is Wheelbirks Farm, a Jersey Cow farm, which specialised in producing ice cream and also had a coffee and ice cream shop attached, called the Parlour, opened in 2010.

== Transport ==
Road
Hindley lies on the B6309 giving access to Stamfordham, Ebchester, Consett and Durham. The B6309 links with the A695 and the A69, offering links with neighbouring villages and towns, Newcastle upon Tyne, Gateshead, Hexham and Carlisle.
Within walking distance (1.5 miles) is the Stocksfield Station Bus Stop. Local buses stopping at this stop are the 40, 602 and the X66, providing links with Hexham, Corbridge, Prudhoe, Ryton, The Metrocentre and Newcastle. There is also a bus service running to Hexham from Hindley once a week on a Tuesday.

Railway
Hindley is located 1.5 miles (2.4 km) away from the nearest railway station, Stocksfield railway station, which is on the Tyne Valley line, and has an hourly service running daily.
