= Northumberland County Show =

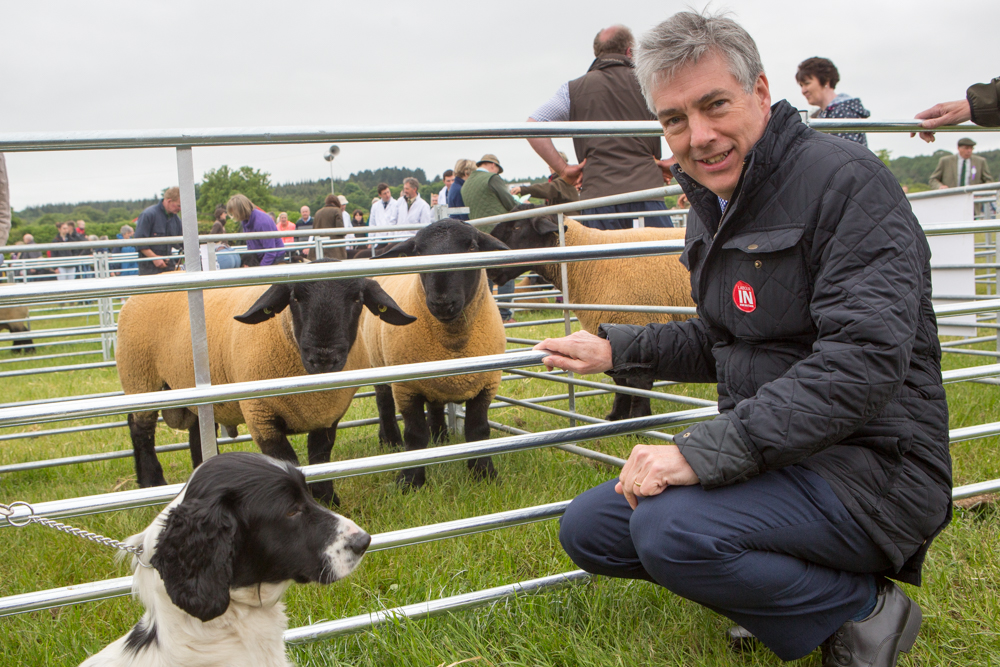
Northumberland County Show, 2016

The Northumberland County Show is an annual one-day agricultural show which takes place in May in Northumberland, England. The show began in the 1830s. Since 2013 the show has been held in the grounds of Bywell Hall in Bywell, near Stocksfield, about 14 miles (23 km) west of Newcastle upon Tyne. In 2019 the show had an attendance of just over 23,000 visitors. The 2020 and 2021 shows were cancelled due to the coronavirus pandemic. The 2024 show featured accessibility improvements, including Braille signage, sign language interpretation, and volunteers trained in dementia awareness.

== History ==
The Northumberland County Show is an annual one-day agricultural show which takes place in May in Northumberland, England. The show is organised by the Tynedale Agricultural Society, and has been running since the 1830s, although it has had several different names in that time. Since 2013 the show has been held in the grounds of Bywell Hall in Bywell, near Stocksfield, about 14 miles (23 km) west of Newcastle upon Tyne. Prior to 2013 it was held at Tynedale Rugby Club in Corbridge.

In 2019 the show had an attendance of just over 23,000 visitors.

The 2020 and 2021 shows were cancelled due to the coronavirus pandemic. Previous cancellations occurred during the World Wars, and the foot and mouth epidemic. The 2023 show featured camel racing as a main event. In 2024, the show was billed as the 'most accessible ever', with social media updates on ground conditions for wheelchair users, Braille signage, a British sign language interpreter, accessible toilets, and volunteers trained in dementia awareness.

The 2026 show had an attendance of 26,339, the highest number of visitors for a decade.
