= Branch End =

Area of Stocksfield, Northumberland, England

Coordinates: 54.948°N 1.900°W

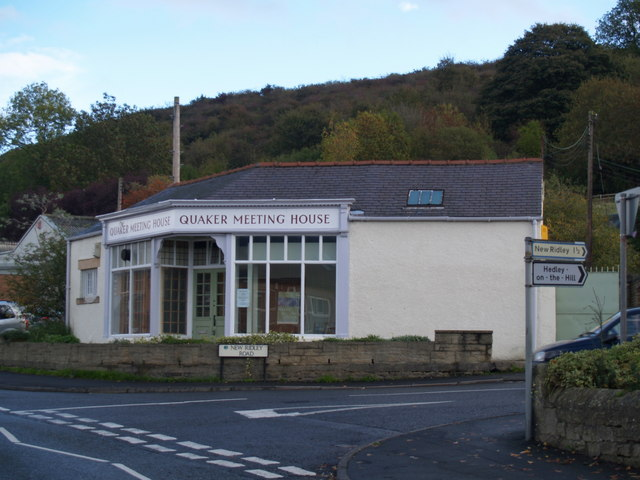
- The Quaker meeting house at Branch End

- Location within Northumberland
- OS grid reference: NZ0661
- Civil parish: Stocksfield
- Unitary authority: Northumberland
- Ceremonial county: Northumberland
- Region: North East
- Country: England
- Sovereign state: United Kingdom
- Post town: STOCKSFIELD
- Postcode district: NE43
- Police: Northumbria
- Fire: Northumberland
- Ambulance: North East
- UK Parliament: Hexham

Branch End is part of the village of Stocksfield in Northumberland, England. It is situated at the junction of the A695 Main Road with New Ridley Road. It lies 1 mile (1.6 km) east of Stocksfield Station, between Hexham and Newcastle upon Tyne.

Local services include a doctors' surgery, pharmacy, petrol station with associated shop and post office, two garages, a hairdresser, newsagent, children's play area and Quaker meeting house. There is a half hourly bus service to Hexham and Newcastle with Go North East "Tyne Valley 10".

== Governance ==
Branch End is in the parish of Stocksfield and the parliamentary constituency of Hexham.
