= West Mickley =

Hamlet in Northumberland, England

Coordinates: 54.949173°N 1.889152°W

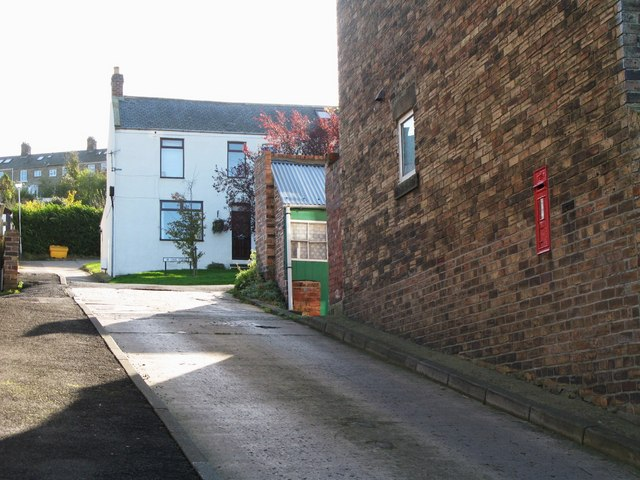
- Houses in West Mickley

- Location within Northumberland
- Unitary authority: Northumberland
- Ceremonial county: Northumberland
- Region: North East
- Country: England
- Sovereign state: United Kingdom
- Post town: HEXHAM
- Police: Northumbria
- Fire: Northumberland
- Ambulance: North East
- UK Parliament: Hexham

West Mickley /ˈmɪkliː/ is a hamlet east of Stocksfield, in the southern part of Northumberland, England. Along with the neighbouring settlements of High Mickley and Mickley Square, it forms part of the electoral ward of Mickley, Northumberland. It is just over half a mile from the town of Prudhoe and is south of the River Tyne. It is not a big village, being nearly half a mile in length with a main road stretching the full length of it (A695).

The small settlement of Mount Pleasant forms part of West Mickley. It has one of the few pubs in the area, the two-centuries-old Blue Bell Inn, though this is closed at the time of writing (2025). On foot, Mount Pleasant is directly accessible from the main part of West Mickley via a steep but paved uphill path alongside High Close Woods and the Belasis Burn. When driving or cycling, however, one needs to take Stonybank Way, which goes uphill just east of the petrol station at Branch End in the neighbouring village of Stocksfield.

== History ==
Beginning with a few houses on the main road and at Mount Pleasant, the village expanded in the late 19th and early 20th century. West Mickley Colliery, owned by West Mickley Coal Co. Ltd, mined coal, iron pyrites and fireclay just east of the village between 1900 and 1924. A tramline carried coal and fireclay about 1 mile eastwards to the larger Eltringham Colliery. There was also a small quarry opposite the Blue Bell Inn at some time before the mid-19th century, but this and the top end of the Belasis Burn / High Close Woods were filled in later in the 20th century.

== Things to do ==
By the main road, where the colliery once lay, there is now a little park next to the houses and a field big enough for dogs to roam. Also there is a walk through Low Close Woods at the opposite side of the A695 to the houses, which leads eventually down to the River Tyne. Not many people use the park or the woods, so they are perfect for a peaceful walk, but the path is well marked and clear.
