= Leadgate =

Leadgate is the name of several places in the north of England:

- Leadgate, County Durham
- Leadgate, Cumbria
- Leadgate, Northumberland
