= Stocksfield Parish =

Civil parish in Northumberland, England

Coordinates: 54.948°N 1.916°W

Stocksfield
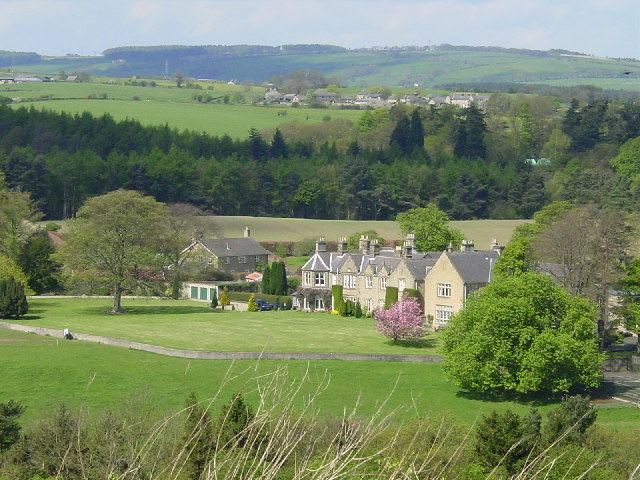
- Hindley Hall

- Location within Northumberland
- Population: 3,011 (2011)
- OS grid reference: NZ055615
- Civil parish: Stocksfield
- Unitary authority: Northumberland
- Ceremonial county: Northumberland
- Region: North East
- Country: England
- Sovereign state: United Kingdom
- Post town: STOCKSFIELD
- Postcode district: NE43
- Dialling code: 01661
- Police: Northumbria
- Fire: Northumberland
- Ambulance: North East
- UK Parliament: Hexham

Stocksfield, formerly Broomley and Stocksfield is a civil parish in Northumberland, England. At the 2001 census, the parish, which includes the village of Stocksfield, along with the hamlets of Apperley Dene, Branch End, Broomley, Hindley, New Ridley and the Painshawfield Estate, had a population of 3,039, falling slightly to 3,011 at the 2011 Census.

On 11 January 2019 the name of the parish was officially changed to Stocksfield, to reflect developments in the area and changes in population over the years. On 1 April 1955 the parish was renamed from "Broomley" to "Broomley and Stocksfield".

== Governance ==
Stocksfield is in the parliamentary constituency of Hexham. Following boundary changes in 2025, Stocksfield is in the electoral ward of Stocksfield and Bywell for Northumberland County Council elections.
