= Apperley Dene =

Hamlet in Northumberland, England

Coordinates: 54.921°N 1.915°W

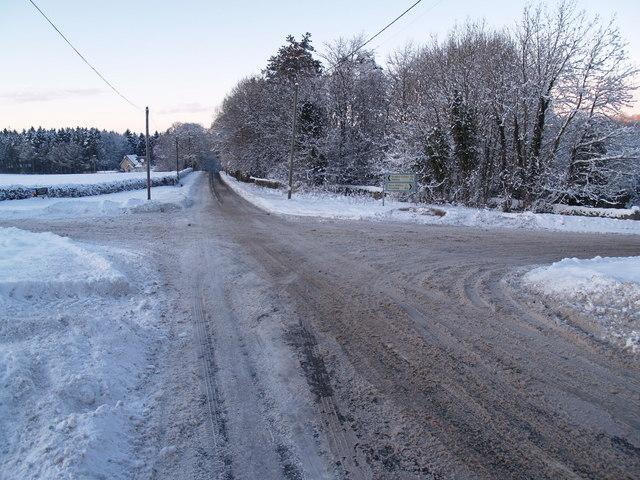
- Apperley Dene Crossroads

- Location within Northumberland
- OS grid reference: NZ055585
- Civil parish: Stocksfield
- Unitary authority: Northumberland
- Ceremonial county: Northumberland
- Region: North East
- Country: England
- Sovereign state: United Kingdom
- Post town: STOCKSFIELD
- Postcode district: NE43
- Dialling code: 01661
- Police: Northumbria
- Fire: Northumberland
- Ambulance: North East
- UK Parliament: Hexham

Apperley Dene is a hamlet in Stocksfield parish, Northumberland, England. It is situated south of the River Tyne between Hexham and Newcastle upon Tyne.
