= Hedley on the Hill =

Village in Northumberland, England

Coordinates: 54.930°N 1.884°W

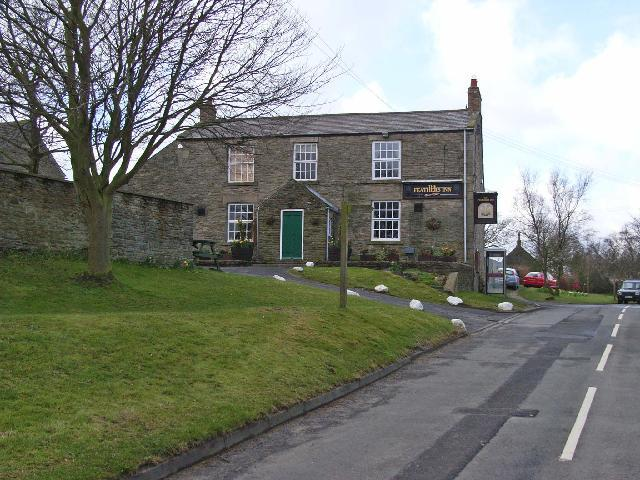
- The Feathers, Hedley on the Hill

- Location within Northumberland
- Population: 239 (2011)
- OS grid reference: NZ075595
- Civil parish: Hedley
- Unitary authority: Northumberland
- Ceremonial county: Northumberland
- Region: North East
- Country: England
- Sovereign state: United Kingdom
- Post town: STOCKSFIELD
- Postcode district: NE43
- Dialling code: 01661
- Police: Northumbria
- Fire: Northumberland
- Ambulance: North East
- UK Parliament: Hexham

Hedley on the Hill is a village in Northumberland, England. It is located between the valley of the River Derwent, and the watershed to the River Tyne. The village is close to Newcastle upon Tyne. It is also situated close to the villages of Stocksfield and Chopwell as well as to the town of Hexham. It offers views along the Tyne Valley, over to the Pennines and even towards the Cheviot Hills on the Scottish border.

== History ==
Hedley appears to have escaped rather unscathed in the wars between England and Scotland that occurred before the union. There are no records of any battles in the area. Similarly, there is no record of any activity involving border reivers (tribal leaders and outlaws that fought across the Scottish/English border) in the village. This has enabled it to develop in relative isolation, with mining and quarrying being the prominent industries since the eighteenth century.

Hedley on the Hill is also close to Hadrian's Wall a World Heritage Site and located in the far south of "Hadrian's Wall Country".

The village is said to have once been home to a bogle known as The Hedley Kow.

== Culture ==
The village holds numerous events including the annual barrel race in which contestants, usually in pairs, run up the hill to the pub with a barrel of beer. The barrel race is run every bank holiday Monday, and organised by The Feathers Inn. Competitors carry an empty nine-gallon beer barrel, over a 1.5-mile course. The Feathers Inn in Hedley-on-the-Hill was named the Great British Pub of the Year 2011.

It is also popular with gliding enthusiasts, being the closest village to the Northumbria Gliding Club in Leadgate.

== Governance ==
Hedley is in the parliamentary constituency of Hexham.
