= Ethel Williams =

Ethel Williams is the name of:

- Ethel Williams (physician) (born 1863), doctor, suffragist, and pacifist in Newcastle upon Tyne.
- Ethel Leckwith (born 1893), fictional character and a protagonist of the Century Trilogy by Ken Follett.
- Ethel Williams (dancer), Ethel Waters's lover
