= Painshawfield Estate =

Housing estate in Stocksfield, Northumberland, England

Coordinates: 54.939°N 1.900°W

Painshawfield
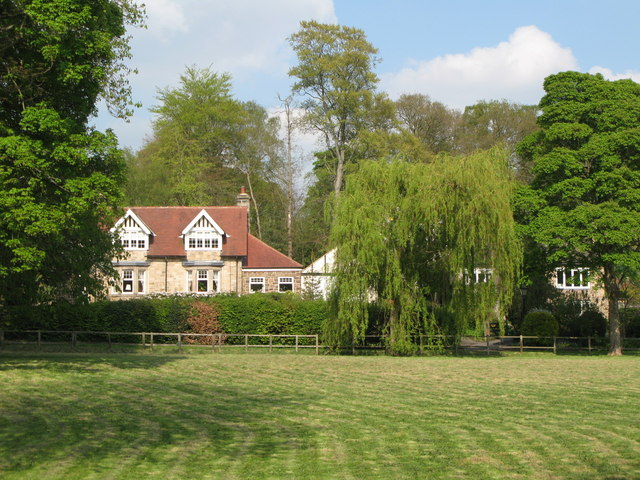
- Cadehill Road

- Location within Northumberland
- OS grid reference: NZ0660
- Civil parish: Stocksfield
- Unitary authority: Northumberland
- Ceremonial county: Northumberland
- Region: North East
- Country: England
- Sovereign state: United Kingdom
- Post town: STOCKSFIELD
- Postcode district: NE43
- Police: Northumbria
- Fire: Northumberland
- Ambulance: North East
- UK Parliament: Hexham

The Painshawfield, Batt House and Birches Nook Estate is a housing estate in the village of Stocksfield in Northumberland, England. It is commonly known as the Painshawfield Estate, being named after one of the three farms on whose land the Estate was built in the years following 1895.

== Governance ==
Painshawfield is in the parliamentary constituency of Hexham.
