= Bywell =

Village in Northumberland, England

Coordinates: 54.948°N 1.930°W

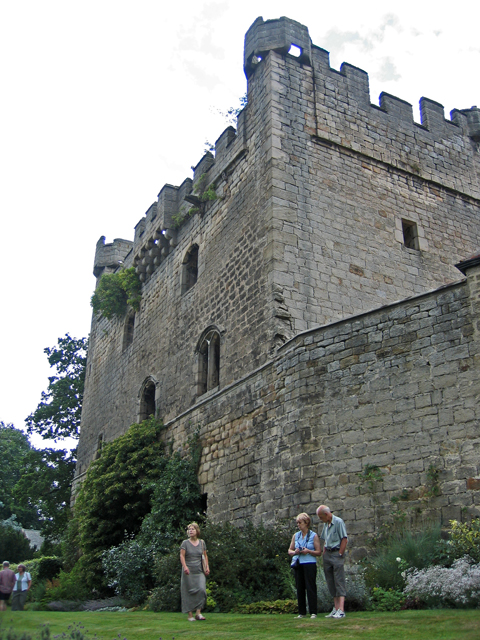
- Bywell Castle

- Location within Northumberland
- Population: 451 (2011)
- OS grid reference: NZ045615
- Civil parish: Bywell
- Unitary authority: Northumberland
- Shire county: Northumberland
- Region: North East
- Country: England
- Sovereign state: United Kingdom
- Post town: STOCKSFIELD
- Postcode district: NE43
- Dialling code: 01661
- Police: Northumbria
- Fire: Northumberland
- Ambulance: North East
- UK Parliament: Hexham

Bywell is a village and civil parish in Northumberland, England. It is situated on the north bank of the River Tyne opposite Stocksfield, between Hexham and Newcastle. The parish has a population of around 380 and Newton to the north is now its most populous settlement.

== Name ==
Bywell means bend in the river: it is situated on a bend on the River Tyne.

== Governance ==
Bywell is in the parliamentary constituency of Hexham.

Bywell is in the electoral ward of Stocksfield and Bywell for Northumberland County Council elections.

== Landmarks ==
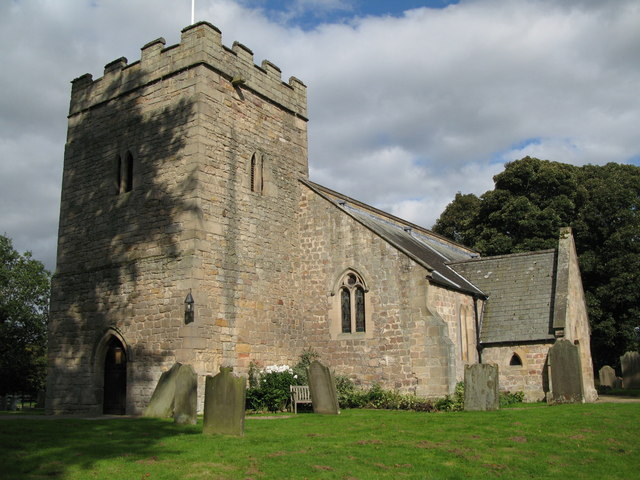
St Peter's

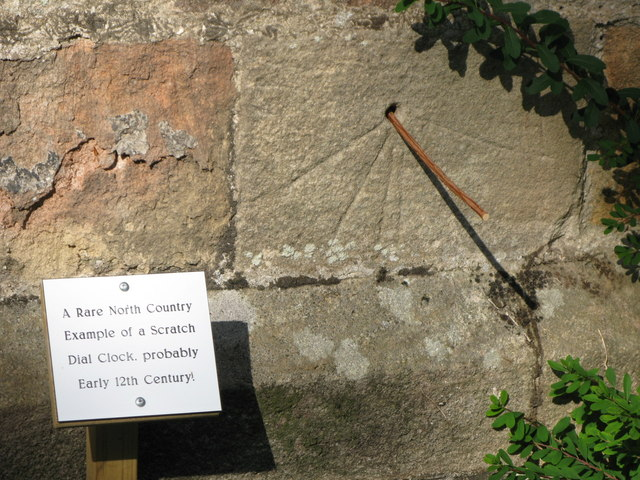
The tide dial at St Peter's

Bywell Hall is an imposing house of 1766 by James Paine.

Bywell Castle is a gatehouse tower built in the early 15th century for Ralph Neville, Earl of Westmorland.

There are two churches in Bywell.

- St Andrew's Church, now redundant, is situated near Bywell Hall and has a fine tower of the Anglo Saxon period, considered to be the best in the county — 55 feet (17 m) high and about 15 square feet (1.4 m^{2}). Part of a cross is another reminder of the early period, when the church then had narrow nave, chancel and apse. It was very much enlarged in the thirteenth century in a time of local prosperity. In the nineteenth century it was extensively restored, and a lot of medieval grave covers were built into the walls of the church very attractively. The thirteenth-century font was where Robert Surtees, the sporting novelist was baptized. He was born at the Riding on 26 August 1806. There are monuments to Fenwicks of Bywell and Bacons of Styford. St Andrew's Church is now surplus to requirements and is preserved as part of our heritage. The vicarage was demolished in 1852, and Mr Beaumont gave land for building another at Riding Mill.
- St Peter's Church is different in situation, among the trees and close to the river. It has a square medieval tower, and the church was extended in the thirteenth century. A close examination of the stonework will reveal features of the Saxon period, and there is evidence of more extensive buildings. There is a tide dial on the south wall. The north chantry or chapel was for many years used as a school. One lancet window is a memorial to the curate Henry Parr Dwarris, who was drowned in the Tyne. There is a monumental brass to Wentworth Canning Blackett Beaumont, Viscount Allendale, born at Bywell Hall in 1860. He presented the Sele and Priory grounds to the people of Hexham. Another inscription commemorates William Wailes (1881), artist in stained glass.

The church is also partly 8th century in date and is the church in which Bishop Egbert of Lindisfarne was consecrated on 11 June 802.

The high garden wall to the south-west of the old vicarage is known locally as the "spite wall". It was built to hide the vicarage from the view of the Hall. When the village of Bywell was cleared, the vicar could not be made to leave.

== Landowners ==
Lord and Lady Allendale own much of the land surrounding Bywell. They also own most of Bywell itself, therefore a substantial amount of the village is not open to the public.

== Transport ==
=== Rail ===
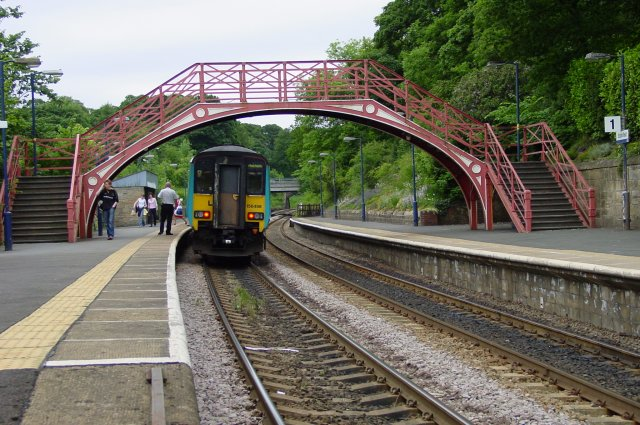
Stocksfield railway station

The village is served by Stocksfield railway station on the Tyne Valley Line. The line was fully opened in 1838, and links the city of Newcastle upon Tyne with Carlisle in Cumbria. The line follows the course of the River Tyne through Northumberland.

Passenger services on the Tyne Valley Line are operated by Northern. The line is also used for freight.

The station is about 1 mile (1.6 km) away on the south side of the River Tyne, in the village of Stocksfield.

=== Road ===
Bywell is about 2.5 km (1.6 mi) from the A69 dual carriageway, to which it is connected by the B6309.

== Education ==
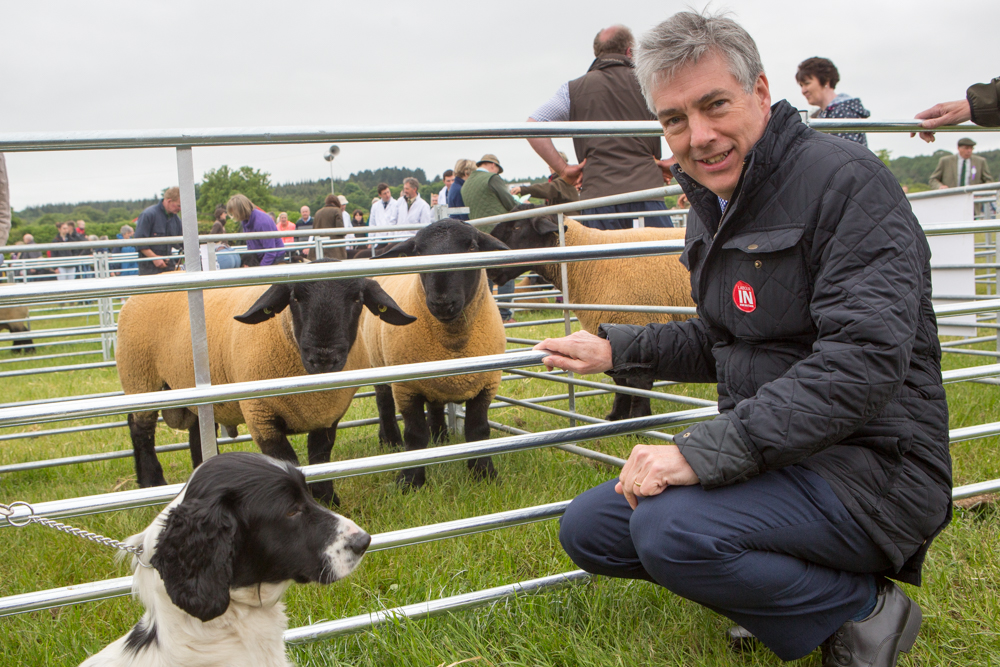
Northumberland County Show, 2016

Bywell is in the catchment area for Ovingham First School, despite Broomley First school in Stocksfield being closer. Bywell is in the catchment area for Ovingham Middle School and Prudhoe Community High School. Mowden Hall School is a private preparatory school in Newton Hall, in the north of Bywell Parish.

== Events ==
Each year in May, Lord and Lady Allendale hold a hunter trial course in aid of the Charlotte Straker Project.

Since 2013 the Northumberland County Show has been held around in the grounds of Bywell Hall.

== Notable people ==
- Wentworth Canning Blackett Beaumont, Viscount Allendale (1860-1923) was born at Bywell Hall

== See also ==
- Bywell Bridge

== Sources ==
- Allsopp, Bruce; Clark, Ursula (1969). Historic Architecture of Northumberland. Newcastle upon Tyne: Oriel Press. ISBN 0 85362 062 8.
