= Leadgate, Northumberland =

Hamlet in Northumberland, England

Coordinates: 54°55′50″N 1°49′41″W

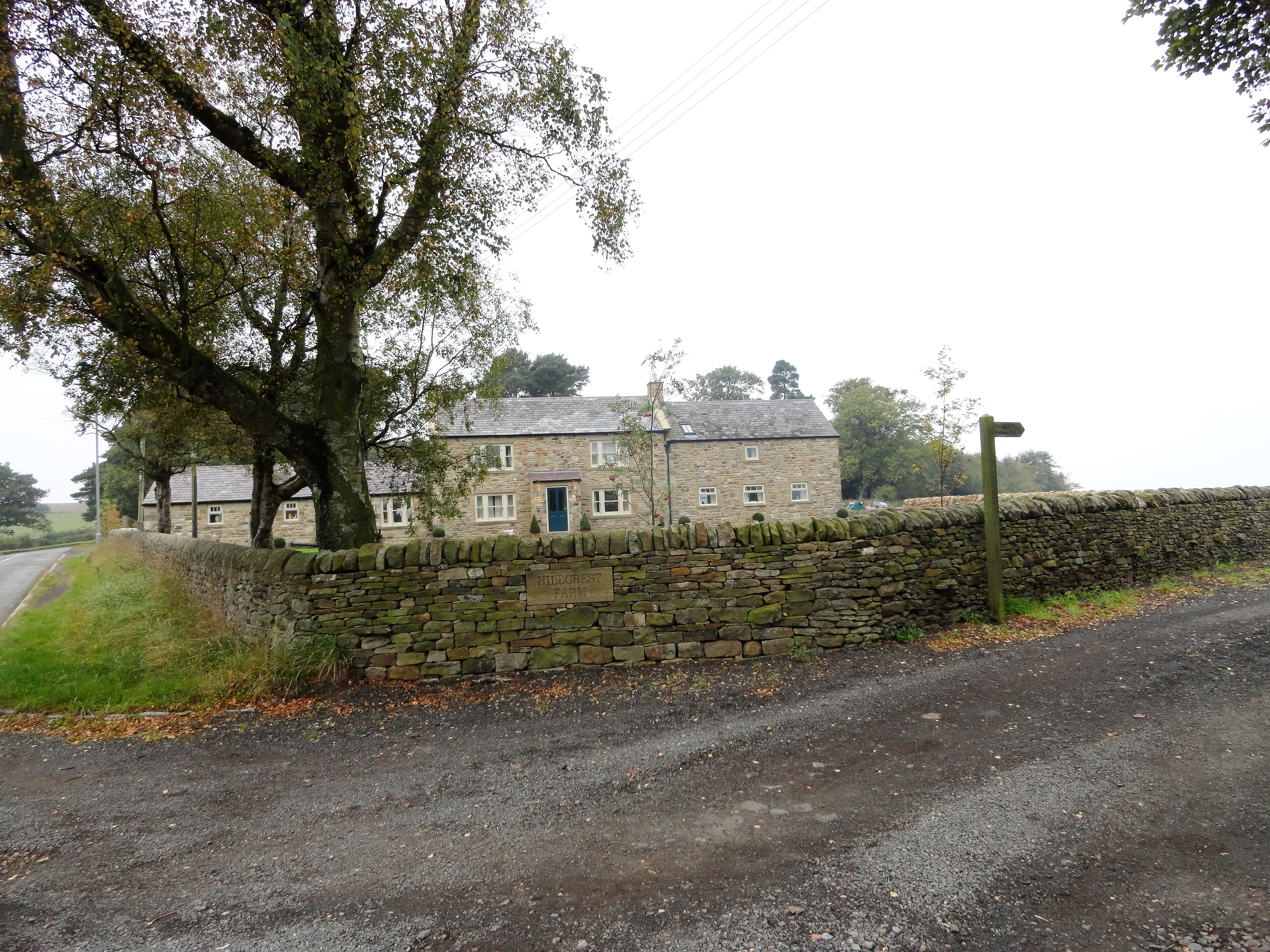
Converted farm

Leadgate is a hamlet just outside Chopwell in southern Northumberland, England. It is 4.5 miles (7.3 km) southeast of Stocksfield and 1 mile (1.8 km) northwest of Chopwell. The hamlet borders onto the Metropolitan borough of Gateshead and a small part of Leadgate sprawls into the borough. The eastern edge of the area is the junction between Greenhead Road and Lead Road, which lead to Chopwell (to the south east) and Coalburns (to the north east) respectively. Leadgate is also home to Northumbria Gliding Club and a number of farms. The area is split between the Northumberland ward of South Tynedale and the Metropolitan borough of Gateshead ward of Chopwell and Rowlands Gill. The station is at Wylam to the north.

Leadgate, as a hamlet, has a population of only between 20 and 30. Nearby Hedley on the Hill, just to the west, has more residents. Leadgate in Northumberland is not to be confused with a place of the same name in County Durham which is almost 7 miles (11 km) to the south.
