= Mowden Hall School =

- Bywell, Stocksfield, Northumberland, NE43 7TP; United Kingdom

Information
- Type: Preparatory school Day & Boarding
- Religious affiliation: Church of England
- Established: 1935
- Head: Phil Sturt
- Gender: Coeducational
- Age: 3 (Pre-Nursery) to 13 (Year 8)
- Enrolment: 200+
- Former pupils: Old Mowdenians
- Website: www.mowdenhallpst.org

Mowden Hall School is a co-educational and boarding preparatory school in the parish of Bywell, in Stocksfield, Northumberland, England, approximately 11 miles (18 km) west of Newcastle upon Tyne. It has been a member of the Prep Schools Trust since 2007 and is a member of the Independent Association of Preparatory Schools (IAPS) and Association of Governing Bodies of Independent Schools (AGBIS).

== History ==
Mowden Hall School was founded in the eponymous Mowden Hall in Mowden, near Darlington, by Frank Marchbank in 1935. The School was evacuated to Fallbarrow, Windermere, at the start of World War II, before acquiring its present site at Newton Hall, near Newcastle upon Tyne, in 1945; the former building was home to the Department for Education and its predecessor agencies for almost fifty years. Mowden Hall School became co-ed in 1982, and opened a Pre-Prep Department in 1993, which now includes Pre-Nursery, Nursery, Reception and Years 1 and 2.

Work was done in the School's early years at Newton to convert the former home of the Joicey family—built in 1835 by architect John Dobson—into a fully functioning prep school.

The school grounds are a size of approximately 52 acres.

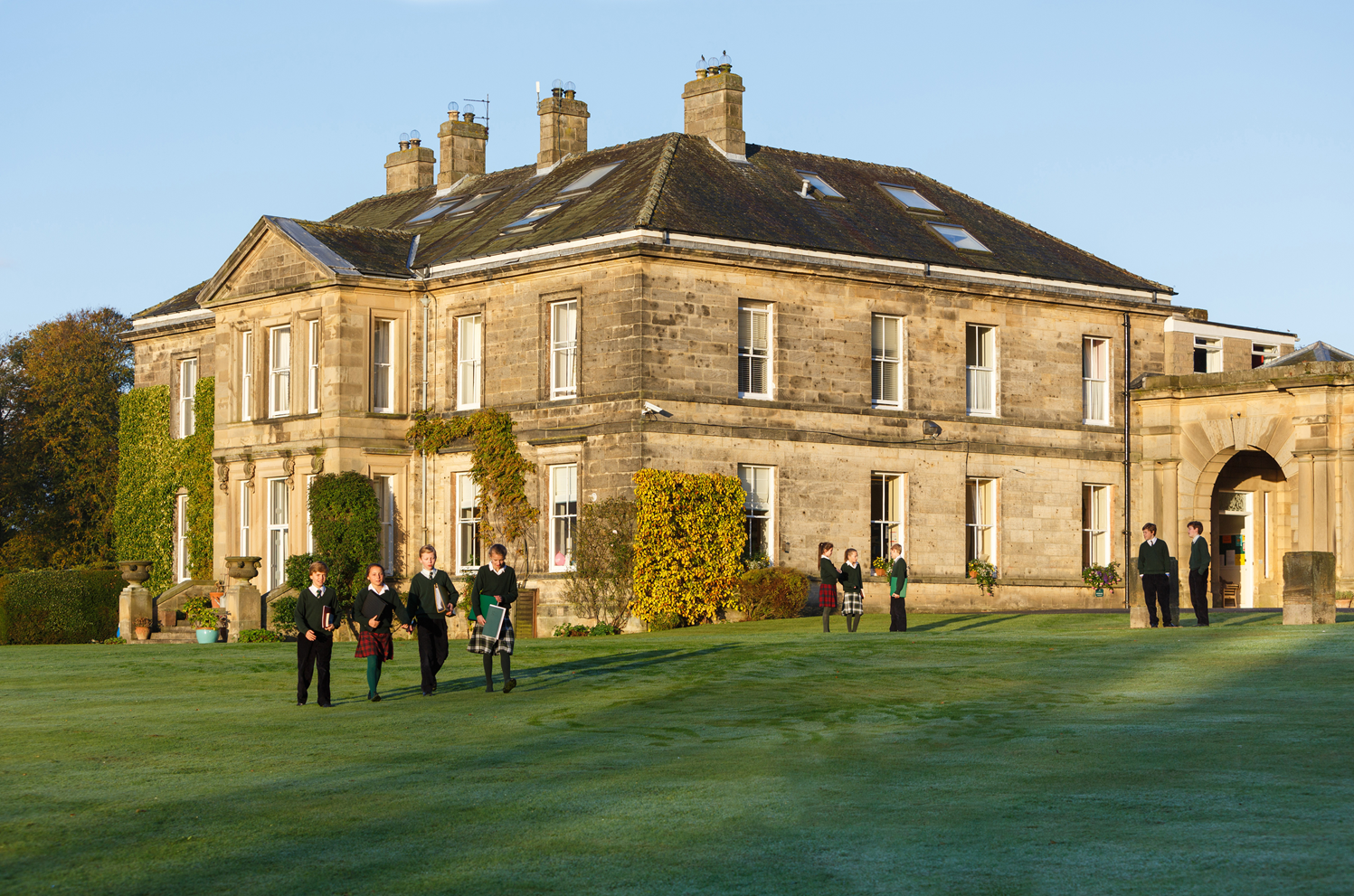
Mowden Hall School, Northumberland

== Boarding ==
Children can be day pupils, part time (flexi) boarders, weekly boarders or full boarders. Full, weekly and flexible boarding are available to pupils in the main prep school (aged 8 and above). Boarders are not allowed to use mobile phones or other electronic devices, but are instead able to communicate with family and friends in other ways, such as landlines. Over three-quarters of the children in the prep school board in some capacity, but there is no requisite to board to attend the school.

== Former pupils ==
- Alexander Armstrong – actor, comedian and presenter
- Julian Bicknell – architect
