= Mickley, Northumberland =

Villages in Northumberland, England

Coordinates: 54.9448°N 1.8748°W

Mickley
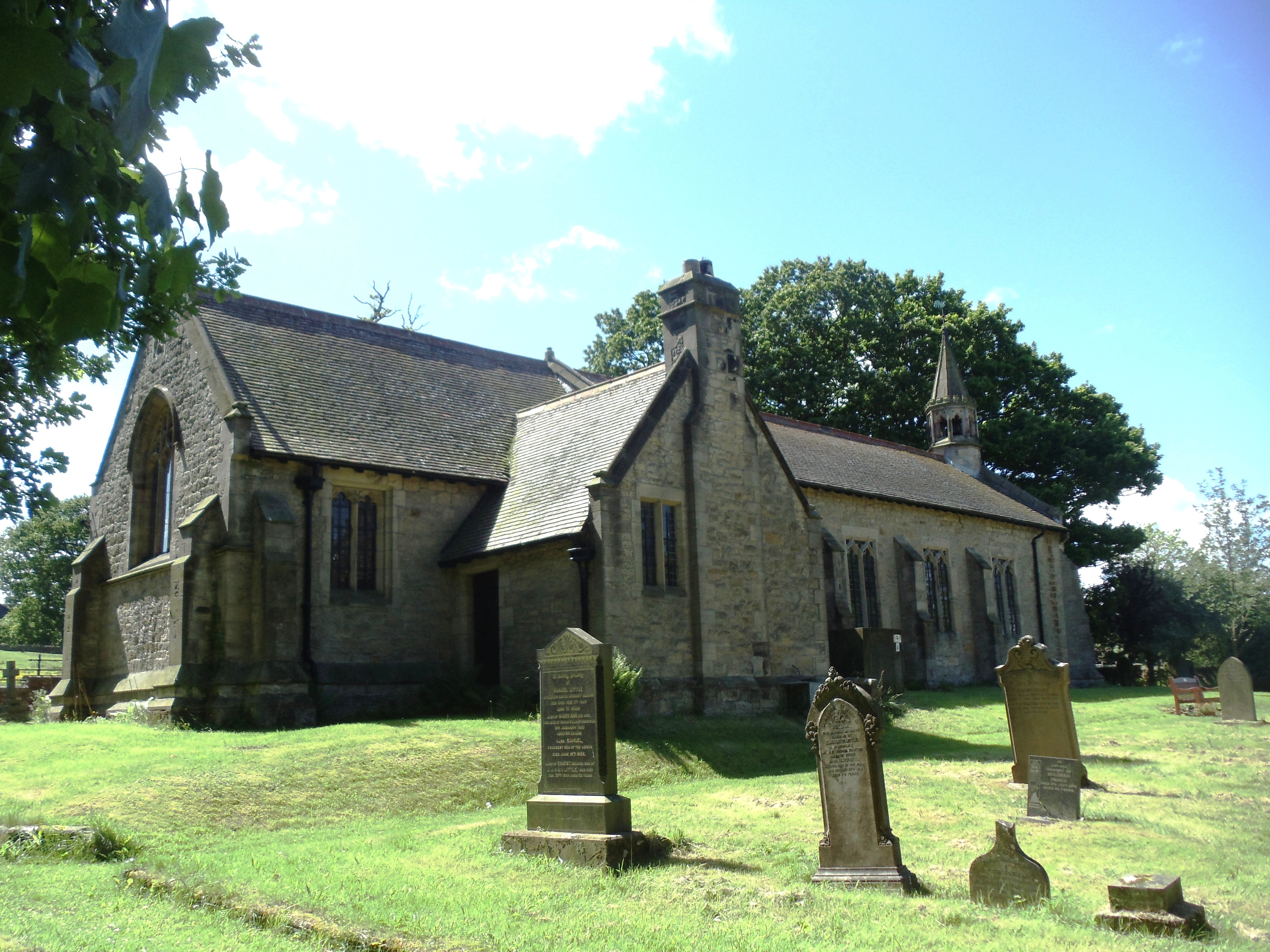

- Location within Northumberland
- OS grid reference: NZ077620
- Civil parish: Prudhoe
- Unitary authority: Northumberland
- Ceremonial county: Northumberland
- Region: North East
- Country: England
- Sovereign state: United Kingdom
- Post town: STOCKSFIELD
- Postcode district: NE43
- Dialling code: 01661
- Police: Northumbria
- Fire: Northumberland
- Ambulance: North East

Mickley is a cluster of villages in the civil parish of Prudhoe, in Northumberland, England. It lies south of the River Tyne and is accessible via the A695. The electoral ward of Mickley comprises the hamlets of Mickley Square, West Mickley (including Mount Pleasant), High Mickley, plus Cherryburn and Eltringham Farm. The population is a little under one thousand.

The Mickley settlements are served by St George's Church, which was built in 1830. Other facilities in Mickley include a First School, garden centre, two social clubs and a cafe on the A695. There is a public house (The Blue Bell Inn), dating from the 1820s, at Mount Pleasant.

The Mickley area is physically situated on a steep, north-facing hill that reaches 203 metres above sea level on Mickley Moor, where views over to both the Simonside Hills and even the Cheviot Hills are often visible on a clear day.

== History ==
Thomas Bewick, wood-engraver and author of A History of British Birds, the first practical field guide, was born in 1753 at Cherryburn House, just north of Mickley Square. Cherryburn House is now a National Trust site.

There were several collieries in Mickley. Mickley Moor Colliery operated from 1766 till about 1781. Its successor, Mickley Colliery, was just below Mickley Square: it operated from the 1950s until the 1940s. There were also drift mines at West Mickley, and in the woods to the East of Mickley Square.

This village once also produced "Mickley bricks," which can still be found in neighbouring areas. The brick kiln remains at the lower end of Mickley.

== Governance ==
Mickley was formerly a township and chapelry in Ovingham parish, from 1866 Mickley was a civil parish in its own right until it was abolished on 1 April 1974 and merged with Prudhoe. In 1951 the parish had a population of 1862.

== Notable people ==
- Thomas Bewick: see above.
- Joe Tulip, professional footballer with Queen of the South F.C. in the club's days in Scotland's top division
- Bob Stokoe, professional footballer and later manager, who won an FA Cup winners medal as a player with Newcastle United In 1955, and later managed Sunderland to victory in the same competition in 1973.
- Fred Liddle, professional footballer with Queens Park Rangers, Huddersfield Town, Rotherham United, Newcastle United, Gillingham, Coventry City and Exeter City between 1927 and 1939
