= Alexander Brown (cricketer) =

English cricketer

Alexander Gordon Brown (born 10 February 1967) is a former English cricketer. He was a left-handed batsman and a right-arm medium-fast bowler who played for Northumberland. He was born in Stocksfield.

Brown, who represented Newcastle in the North East Premier League between 2001 and 2004, and Chester-le-Street between 2005 and 2006, made a single appearance in the C&G Trophy in August 2003, against Shropshire. Batting in the tailend, Brown scored 4 runs in a game curtailed by rain.

Brown bowled 4.1 overs in the match, conceding 24 runs.
