= Bywell Hall =

18th-century country house

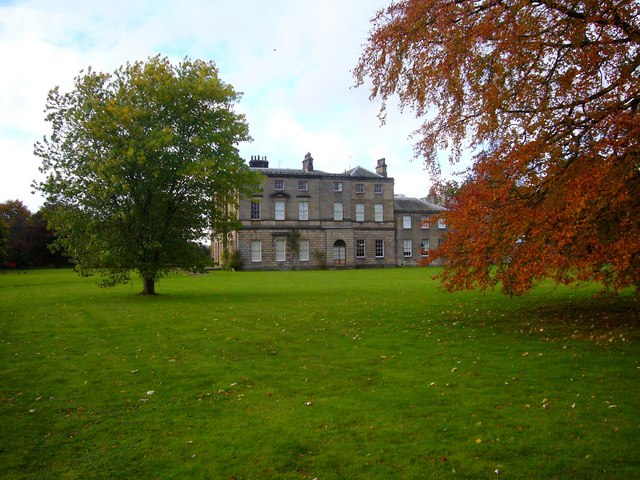
- Bywell Hall, 2008

- Location in Northumberland

General information
- Location: Northumberland, England
- Coordinates: 54.948°N 1.929°W
- OS grid: NZ046615

Bywell Hall is a privately owned 18th-century country house situated on the north bank of the River Tyne at Bywell, Northumberland, England. It is a Grade II* listed building.

== History ==
The manor of Bywell and Bywell Castle were owned by the Neville family in the 14th century but following the attainder of Charles Neville, 6th Earl of Westmorland for his part in the Rising of the North the Neville estates were forfeited and Bywell was sold in 1571 by the Crown to the Fenwick family.

William Fenwick (son of John Fenwick High Sheriff of Northumberland in 1727) built the new house at Bywell to designs by architect James Paine in 1760.

The estate was sold to Thomas Wentworth Beaumont for £145,000 early in the 19th century and the house was improved by the Beaumonts, with the assistance of architect John Dobson, in 1827 and further altered later in the 19th century.

The house is the home of Wentworth Beaumont, 4th Viscount Allendale and the estate is operated commercially by Allendale Estates.
