= Broomley =

Village in Northumberland, England

Coordinates: 54.939°N 1.946°W

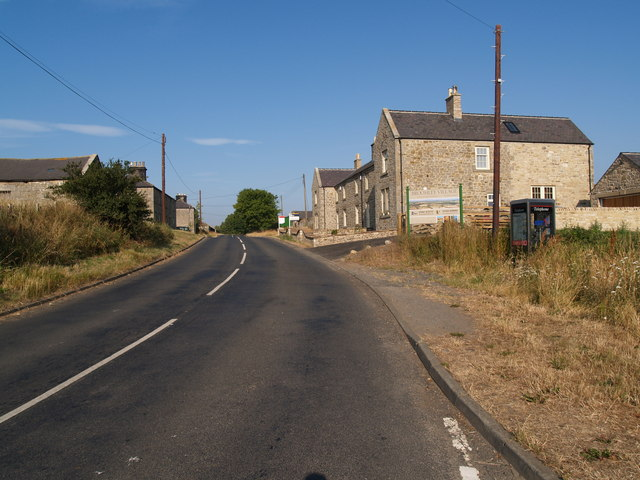
- Broomley village

- Location within Northumberland
- OS grid reference: NZ0360
- Civil parish: Stocksfield
- Unitary authority: Northumberland
- Ceremonial county: Northumberland
- Region: North East
- Country: England
- Sovereign state: United Kingdom
- Post town: STOCKSFIELD
- Postcode district: NE43
- Dialling code: 01661
- Police: Northumbria
- Fire: Northumberland
- Ambulance: North East
- UK Parliament: Hexham

Broomley is a village in the civil parish of Stocksfield, in Northumberland, England. It is situated between Hexham and Newcastle upon Tyne, to the south of the River Tyne. "Broomley School" is located not in Broomley, but in the neighbouring village of Stocksfield. Until 11 January 2019 Stocksfield parish was officially called "Broomley and Stocksfield", and until 1 April 1955 it was called just "Broomley".

== History ==
Dere Street, a Roman road, passes close by Broomley to the southwest. The first records of the village date to the 13th Century when it was included in a list of possessions of the Barony of Balliol, and Adam the forester was granted a landholding in "Bromleye". Wheelbirks furnace, a scheduled monument to the south of the village, produced iron in the 16th Century. In 1856 an Ordnance Survey map showed a Baptist Church at the east end of the settlement and up to five farms of varying sizes.
