= Wentworth Beaumont, 3rd Viscount Allendale =

British peer

Wentworth Hubert Charles Beaumont, 3rd Viscount Allendale (12 September 1922 – 27 December 2002) was a British peer, Royal Air Force officer and race horse breeder.

== Early life ==
Allendale was born on 12 September 1922 to the 2nd Viscount Allendale, a courtier, and his wife Violet Seely. His father's father was the 1st Viscount Allendale, a politician, and his mother's father was Sir Charles Seely, 2nd Baronet, also a politician. He spent his earlier years living at the family seat of Bretton Hall, near Wakefield, Yorkshire. He was an accident prone child and had a number of near-death experiences: he was rescued from a house fire in 1927, was electrocuted and left temporarily paralysed when a lamp fell in his bath when aged 14, and at 15 shot himself while pigeon shooting with friends. He was educated at Eton College, a public school in Eton, Berkshire.

== Career ==
Allendale joined the Royal Air Force Volunteer Reserve (RAFVR) in 1940 after he had completed his schooling. He had flown 71 missions in a Spitfire until he became a prisoner of war in 1942. On 31 May, he had been attacking a ship off the coast of the Netherlands, before being shot down by flak. Having injured his leg in the crash, he was taken captive and transported to Stalag Luft III, a prisoner-of-war camp in Germany. He was promoted to flying officer (war substantive) on 16 July 1942 and to flight lieutenant (war substantive) on 16 July 1943. In March 1944, the Great Escape occurred from Stalag Luft III. He was not involved in the escape itself on account of his leg injury, but was part of the map-making team. Having spent three years as a prisoner of war, he was released following the end of World War II in 1945.

Peerage of the United Kingdom
Preceded by Wentworth Beaumont	Viscount Allendale; 1956–2002	Succeeded by Wentworth Beaumont
