= New Ridley =

Hamlet in Northumberland, England

Coordinates: 54.929°N 1.911°W

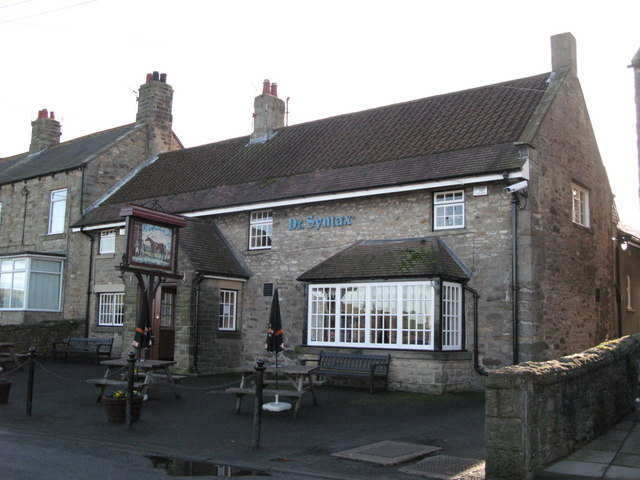
- The Dr. Syntax public house

- Location within Northumberland
- Civil parish: Stocksfield
- Unitary authority: Northumberland
- Ceremonial county: Northumberland
- Region: North East
- Country: England
- Sovereign state: United Kingdom
- Post town: STOCKSFIELD
- Postcode district: NE43
- Dialling code: 01661
- Police: Northumbria
- Fire: Northumberland
- Ambulance: North East
- UK Parliament: Hexham

New Ridley is a hamlet in the county of Northumberland, England. It is in the parish of Stocksfield and the parliamentary constituency of Hexham. It is one of four "Ridleys" in the parish, along with Old Ridley, East Ridley and Ridley Mill.

Services in New Ridley include Stocksfield Golf Club and the Dr. Syntax public house. The pub is named after a racehorse of the same name which was in turn named after a fictional character created by the writer William Combe.
