= Wentworth Beaumont, 2nd Viscount Allendale =

British peer and soldier (1890-1956)

Viscount Allendale in 1953.

Arms of Beaumont, Viscount Allendale: Gules, a lion rampant or armed and langued azure an orle of eight crescents of the second

Wentworth Henry Canning Beaumont, 2nd Viscount Allendale, KG, CB, CBE, MC (6 August 1890 – 16 December 1956) was a British peer, Lord Lieutenant of Northumberland, and army captain.

== Origins ==
He was the son of Wentworth Beaumont, 1st Viscount Allendale by his wife Lady Alexandrina Louisa Maud Vane-Tempest.

== Education ==
He was educated at Eton College and graduated from Trinity College, Cambridge in 1912.

== Military service ==
Allendale was commissioned into the Territorial Force in 1912 and transferred to the 2nd Life Guards in 1913. He fought in the First World War, serving with the Guards Machine Gun Regiment, and rose the rank of Captain in 1915. From 1918 to 1919 he was an Acting Major while commanding a company.

== Political career ==
Allendale succeeded his father in the viscountcy in 1923 and was a Lord in Waiting between 1931 and 1932 in Ramsay MacDonald's ministry. From 1949 to 1956 he served as Lord-Lieutenant of Northumberland. In 1951, he was awarded an honorary doctorate of Civil Law from the University of Durham.

== Marriage and children ==
On 20 July 1921 at St Martin-in-the-Fields Lord Allendale married Violet Lucy Emily Seely, daughter of Sir Charles Seely, 2nd Baronet, by whom he had six children:

- Wentworth Hubert Charles Beaumont, 3rd Viscount Allendale (12 September 1922 – 27 December 2002)
- Ela Hilda Aline Beaumont (27 May 1925 – 18 February 2002), married Charles Howard, 12th Earl of Carlisle.
- Richard Blackett Beaumont (13 August 1926 – 2010)
- Sir Edward Nicholas Canning Beaumont (14 December 1929 – 22 June 2011)
- Matthew Henry Beaumont (10 April 1933 – 16 December 2017)
- George Andrew Beaumont (21 June 1938 – 3 January 1960)

Honorary titles
Preceded by Sir Charles Trevelyan, Bt	Lord Lieutenant of Northumberland; 1949–1956	Succeeded by The Duke of Northumberland
Peerage of the United Kingdom
Preceded by Wentworth Beaumont	Viscount Allendale; 1923–1956	Succeeded by Wentworth Beaumont
