= Stocksfield =

Village in Northumberland, England

Coordinates: 54.948°N 1.914°W

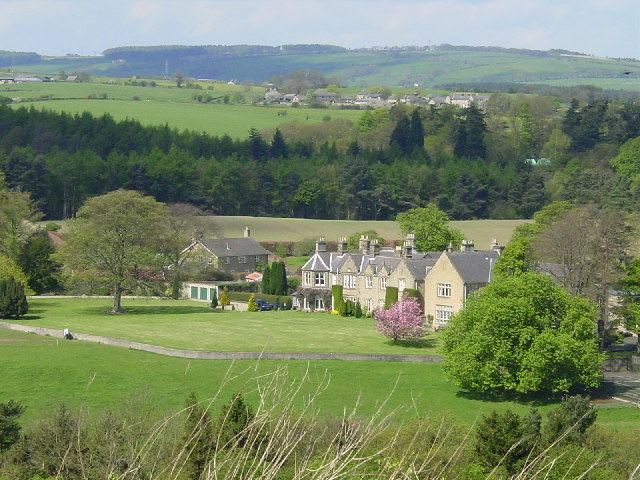
- Hindley Hall, Stocksfield

- Location within Northumberland
- Population: 2,616 2011 Census
- OS grid reference: NZ053612
- Civil parish: Stocksfield
- Unitary authority: Northumberland
- Ceremonial county: Northumberland
- Region: North East
- Country: England
- Sovereign state: United Kingdom
- Post town: STOCKSFIELD
- Postcode district: NE43
- Dialling code: 01661
- Police: Northumbria
- Fire: Northumberland
- Ambulance: North East
- UK Parliament: Hexham

Stocksfield is a small village situated close to the River Tyne, about 14 miles (23 km) west of Newcastle upon Tyne in the southern part of Northumberland, England. There are several smaller communities within the parish of Stocksfield, including Branch End, New Ridley, Broomley, Hindley and the Painshawfield Estate. Other villages in Stocksfield's postal district include Bywell, Newton, Mickley, and Hedley on the Hill.

== History ==
Dere Street, a Roman road, passes through the parish to the south of Broomley, and Roman stone was used in the construction of St Andrew's Church in 803 AD. Bywell gained in importance in the 600 years following the Norman conquest as a centre of metalworking. It was in the hands of the Barony of Balliol until 1296 when it passed in turn to the Nevilles, the Fenwicks, and finally in 1809 to the Beaumont family.

The township of "Stokesfeld" was first mentioned in 1242, and was part of Bywell St Andrew's parish. The origins of the name are uncertain, but it may be derived from the Old English for "open land belonging to an outlying hamlet". in 1673 Birches Nook was home to Ann Armstrong, a "notorious witch-finder" whose accusations caused a great sensation throughout the county.

== Governance ==
Stocksfield is in the parliamentary constituency of Hexham. Joe Morris of the Labour Party is the Member of Parliament.

For Local Government purposes it belongs to Northumberland Council a unitary authority. At a local level it is governed by Stocksfield Parish Council. On 11 January 2019 the name of the parish was officially changed from "Broomley and Stocksfield" to Stocksfield, reflecting developments in the area and changes in population over the years.

== Demography ==
In the 2011 census, the median age in Stocksfield and Broomhaugh was 49 years. 98.6 per cent of the population had white ethnicity and 68.8 per cent were Christian. No other religion exceeded 0.3 per cent with 23.9 per cent having no religion.

== Transport ==
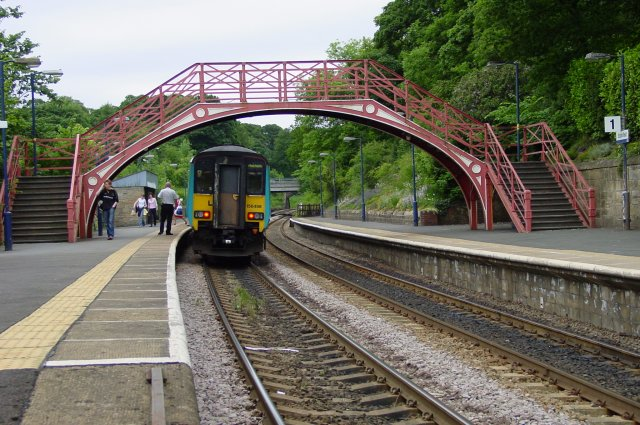
Stocksfield railway station

Railway

The village is served by the Tyne Valley Line, with trains running to Newcastle, Hexham and Carlisle. Stocksfield station was opened on 9 March 1835 by the Newcastle and Carlisle Railway. Passenger services are operated by Northern, with the line also being used for freight.

Road

Stocksfield is linked to Newcastle upon Tyne and the A1 by the A695 which passes through the village. It is also linked to Leadgate and Stamfordham by the B6309. The A695 and B6309 meet near the railway station. The village is served by the 10 bus service operated by Go North East running from Hexham (25 minutes away) to Newcastle (1 hour).

== Education ==
Stocksfield has a school, Broomley First School, which is part of the Whittonstall and Broomley First Schools Federation. Stocksfield lies in the catchment area for Ovingham Middle School and Prudhoe High School. Mowden Hall School is a private prep school near Newton, north of the river.

== Religious sites ==
There are four Christian places of worship in Stocksfield: a Church of England Church, Quaker Meeting House, Baptist Church and Methodist Church. Nearby are the twin churches of St Peter's and St Andrew's in Bywell.

== Public services ==
Stocksfield Community Centre is owned and managed by Stocksfield Community Association (formerly SICA) which is a charitable company limited by guarantee. The Association's objectives are to promote the benefit of the all inhabitants of Stocksfield and its neighbourhood, without distinction by associating with local authorities, voluntary organisations and inhabitants in a common effort to advance education and provide facilities, in the interests of social welfare for recreational and leisure time occupation, with the object of improving the conditions of life for residents. The Community Centre is available for hire by local groups and individuals for events, activities, meetings and private functions.

== Sports and recreation ==
Stocksfield boasts many sporting facilities including a cricket club, tennis club, golf club. and a running club known as Stocksfield Striders. There are also two play areas and a well-utilised Community Centre. In 2012, Stocksfield was one of the official stop off points for the Olympic torch before it made its way to the Olympic Games opening ceremony.

== Awards ==
The parish of Broomley and Stocksfield was officially crowned Calor Northumberland Village of the Year in November 2008. The competition is organised annually by Community Action Northumberland (CAN) with sponsorship provided by LPG (liquefied petroleum gas) supplier Calor.

== Photographs of Stocksfield ==
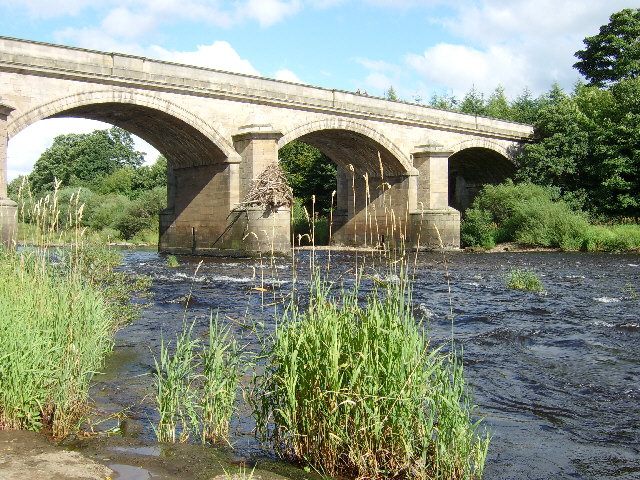
Bywell Bridge

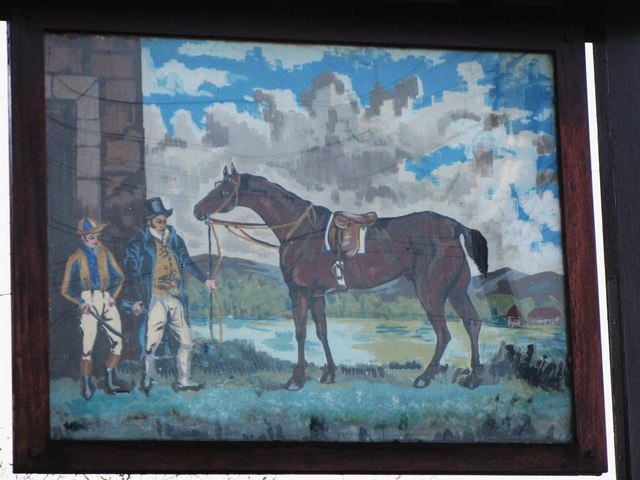
Dr. Syntax pub sign

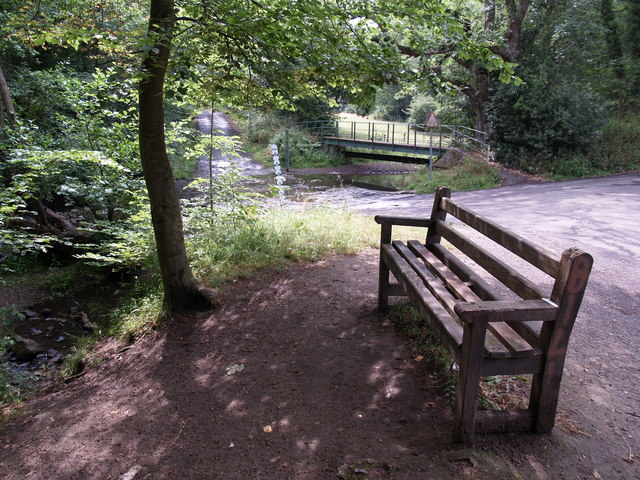
The Fords

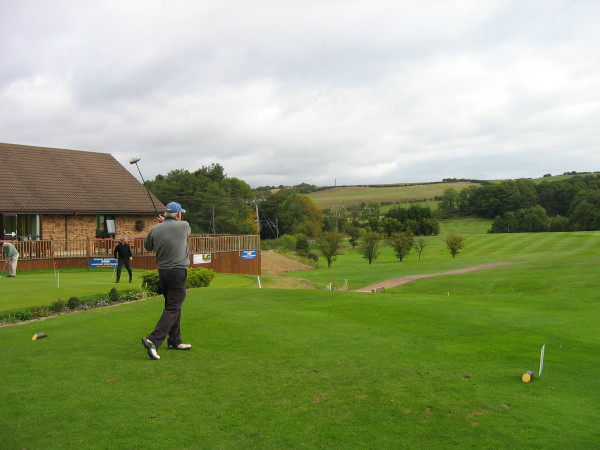
The Golf Course

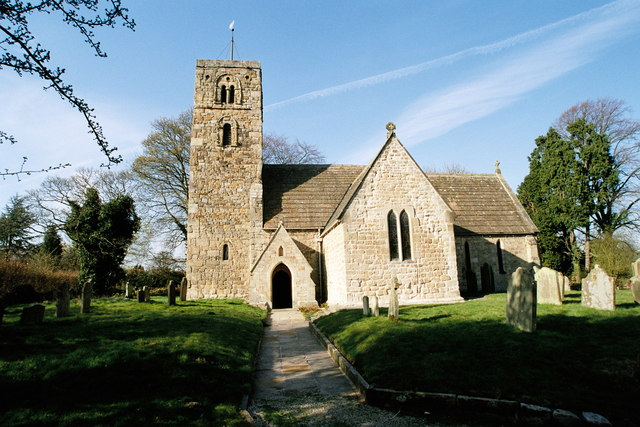
St Andrew's Church

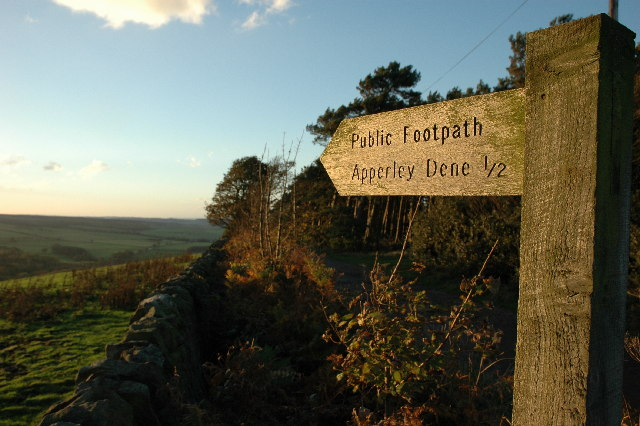
Apperley Bank

== Notable people ==
Born in Stocksfield

- Mabel Atkinson (1876–1958), feminist and socialist
- Dame Veronica Wedgwood (1910–1997), historian
- Alexander Brown (born 1968), cricketer, played for Northumberland.

Lives (or lived) in Stocksfield

- Rodney Atkinson (born 1948), academic and author
- Rowan Atkinson (born 1955), actor and comedian
- Edgar Bainton (1880–1956), composer
- Francoise Boufhal (born 1988), actress and model
- Alan Clark (born 1952), ex Dire Straits keyboard player
- Brendan Foster (born 1948), ex athletics 10,000 m record holder
- Frances Hardcastle (1866–1941), mathematician and women's activist
- Richard Harpin (born 1964), businessman
- Graeme Lowdon (born 1965), businessman and entrepreneur
- Alan Milburn (born 1958), politician
- Chris Paisley (born 1986), professional golfer
- Sir Richard Pease, 3rd Baronet (born 1922), banker
- Ethel Williams (1863–1948), physician and suffragist
