= Bywell Castle =

15th-century castle in Northumberland, England

- Bywell, Northumberland in England
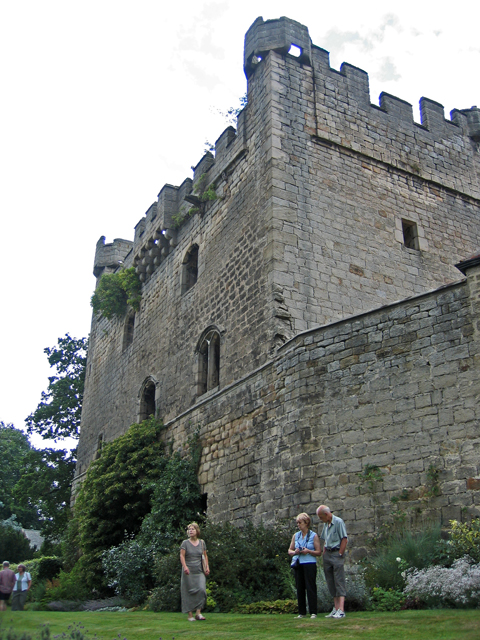

Site information
- Owner: Private
- Open to the public: No

Location
- Coordinates: 54.951°N 1.925°W
- Grid reference: NZ049618

Site history
- Built: 1430

Garrison information
- Designations: Grade I listed building; Scheduled Ancient Monument

Bywell Castle is situated in the village of Bywell overlooking the River Tyne, four miles east of Corbridge, Northumberland, England (grid reference NZ049615). It is a Grade I listed building and a Scheduled Ancient Monument.

It was built in 1430 by the Neville family (see Earl of Westmorland) but was never completed. The impressive three-storey gatehouse remains, together with part of a curtain wall into which has been incorporated a much later house (Grade II listed).

King Henry VI took refuge in Bywell Castle after the Battle of Hexham in 1464.

The Castle is privately owned and not normally open to visitors. It is the seat of the Viscounts Allendale.

Bywell Castle gave its name to a ship which ploughed into the SS Princess Alice on the River Thames in September 1878, sinking her within minutes. The number of lives lost in the disaster are unclear but estimates have ranged from 590 to 640.
