= Frances Hardcastle =

English mathematician

- Born: 13 August 1866; Writtle, Essex, England, UK
- Died: 26 December 1941 (aged 75); Royal Hotel, Cambridge, England
- Education: Girton College, Cambridge
- Scientific career
- Fields: Mathematics

Frances Hardcastle (13 August 1866 – 26 December 1941) was an English mathematician, in 1894 one of the founding members of the American Mathematical Society. Her work included contributions to the theory of point groups.

== Biography ==
Born in Writtle, just outside Chelmsford, Essex, Hardcastle was a daughter of Henry Hardcastle, a barrister, by his marriage in 1865 to Maria Sophia Herschel, daughter of the astronomer, mathematician, and chemist Sir John Herschel.

She was educated at Girton College (Tripos Part I 1891 & Part II 1892), and obtained a Certificate in Mathematics.

In 1892, she went to the University of Chicago for a year as an honorary fellow, then spent another year at Bryn Mawr College studying under Charlotte Scott. While at Bryn Mawr she was president of the Graduate Club and translated Felix Klein's book On Riemann's Theory of Algebraic functions and Integrals. In 1895, she recommenced postgraduate studies at Cambridge, and within a few years had published several papers on point-groups. She earned a BA degree from the University of London in 1903. Trinity College Dublin awarded her an MA (ad eundem) in 1905.

Hardcastle was one of 156 British women who publicly supported the aims of the International Congress of Women, held in The Hague in April 1915. These aims were, "1. To demand that international disputes shall in future be settled by some other means than war," and "2. To claim that women shall have a voice in the affairs of nations." Until 1909, she was an Honorary Secretary of the National Union of Women's Suffrage Societies (NUWSS).

Hardcastle was the lifelong companion of Dr Ethel Williams, a physician, Justice of the Peace, feminist, and social reformer. She died at the Royal Hotel, Cambridge, on 26 December 1941, when her home address was stated as Low Bridges, Stocksfield, Northumberland, and left a substantial estate valued at £4,400. Probate was granted to Ethel Williams and Mabel Annie Burnip.

== Notable publications ==
- "A Theorem concerning the Special Systems of Point-Groups on a Particular Type of Base-Curve". Proceedings of the London Mathematical Society. s1-29 (1): 132–140. 1897. doi:10.1112/plms/s1-29.1.132. ISSN 0024-6115.
- "Some observations on the modern theory of point groups". Bulletin of the American Mathematical Society. 4 (8): 390–403. 1898. doi:10.1090/S0002-9904-1898-00517-7. ISSN 0002-9904.
- "Report on Present State of the Theory of Point Groups". Report of the Seventieth Meeting of the British Association for the Advancement of Science - 1900. 70. London: John Murray: 121. 1900.
