= Riding Mill railway station =

Railway station in Northumberland, England

Riding Mill
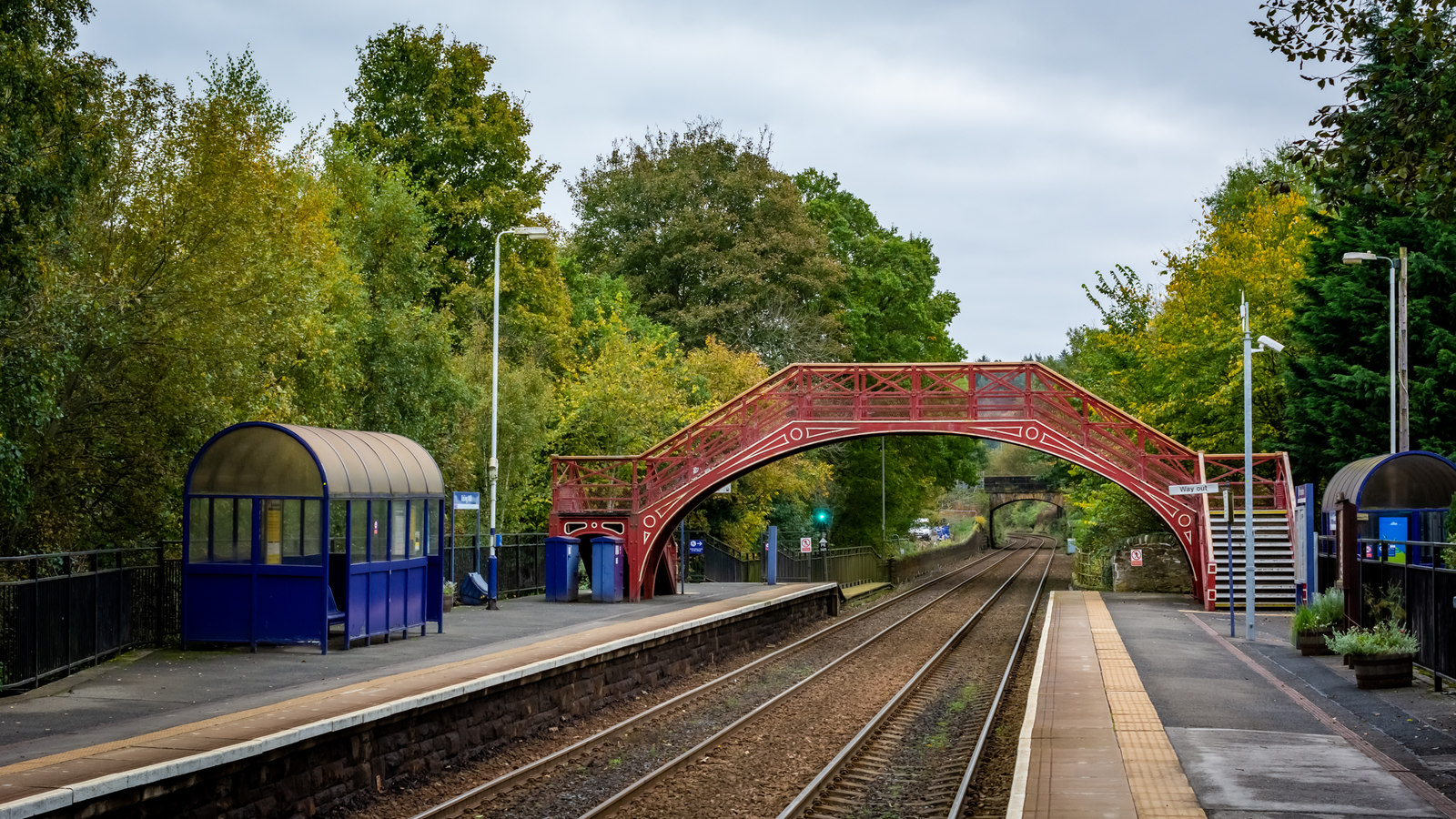

General information
- Location: Riding Mill, Northumberland; England
- Coordinates: 54°56′56″N 1°58′19″W
- Grid reference: NZ019615
- Owner: Network Rail
- Manager: Northern Trains
- Platforms: 2
- Tracks: 2

Other information
- Station code: RDM
- Classification: DfT category F2

History
- Original company: Newcastle and Carlisle Railway
- Pre-grouping: North Eastern Railway
- Post-grouping: London and North Eastern Railway; British Rail (North Eastern Region)

Key dates
- 9 March 1835: Opened

Passengers
- 2021/22: ▲19,582
- 2022/23: ▲24,162
- 2023/24: ▲29,734
- 2024/25: ▲33,170
- 2025/26: ▲33,720
Location
- Location within Northumberland
Notes
- Passenger statistics from the Office of Rail and Road

Riding Mill is a railway station on the Tyne Valley Line, which runs between Newcastle and Carlisle via Hexham. The station, situated 16 miles 71 chains (16.9 mi; 27.2 km) west of Newcastle, serves the villages of Broomhaugh and Riding Mill in Northumberland, England. It is owned by Network Rail and managed by Northern Trains.

== History ==
The Newcastle and Carlisle Railway was formed in 1829, and was opened in stages. The station opened in March 1835, following the commencement of passenger trains between Blaydon and Hexham.

Riding Mill was reduced to an unstaffed halt in 1967, along with most of the other stations on the line that escaped the Beeching Axe. The original station buildings on the westbound platform remain as a private residence.

In January 2019, the platforms at the station were extended ahead of the introduction of upgraded rolling stock, as part of the Great North Rail project.

== Facilities ==
The station has two platforms, both of which have a ticket machine (which accepts card or contactless payment only), seating, waiting shelter, next train audio and visual displays and an emergency help point. Platforms are linked by a pre-grouping metal footbridge, similar to those at Haltwhistle and Wetheral, meaning there is step-free access to the Carlisle-bound platform only. There is a small car park and cycle storage at the station.

Riding Mill is part of the Northern Trains penalty fare network, meaning that a valid ticket or promise to pay notice is required prior to boarding the train.

== Services ==
As of the December 2023 timetable change, there is an hourly service between Newcastle and Hexham (or Carlisle on Sunday), with additional trains at peak times. All services are operated by Northern Trains.

Rolling stock used: Class 156 Super Sprinter and Class 158 Express Sprinter

Preceding station	National Rail	Following station
Stocksfield towards Newcastle	Northern Trains; Tyne Valley Line	Corbridge towards Carlisle
	Historical railways	
Stocksfield	North Eastern Railway; Newcastle and Carlisle Railway	Corbridge
