= Corbridge railway station =

Railway station in Northumberland, England

Corbridge
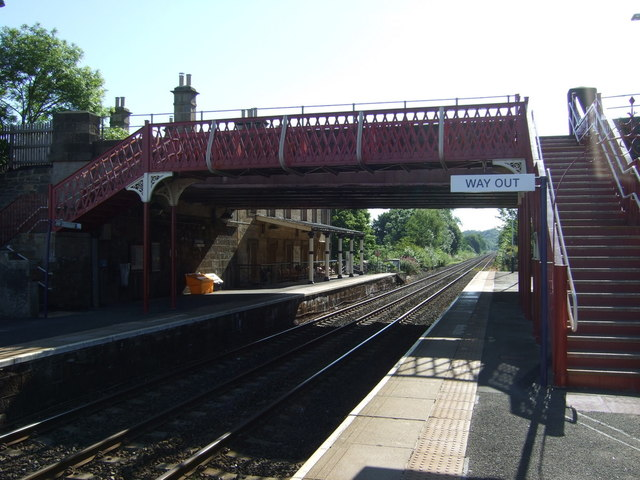

General information
- Location: Corbridge, Northumberland; England
- Coordinates: 54°57′59″N 2°01′09″W
- Grid reference: NY989635
- Owner: Network Rail
- Manager: Northern Trains
- Platforms: 2
- Tracks: 2

Other information
- Station code: CRB
- Classification: DfT category F1

History
- Original company: Newcastle and Carlisle Railway
- Pre-grouping: North Eastern Railway
- Post-grouping: London and North Eastern Railway; British Rail (North Eastern Region)

Key dates
- 9 March 1835: Opened

Passengers
- 2020/21: ▼10,364
- 2021/22: ▲46,692
- 2022/23: ▲55,668
- 2023/24: ▲66,982
- 2024/25: ▲77,068
Location
- Location within Northumberland
Notes
- Passenger statistics from the Office of Rail and Road

Corbridge is a railway station on the Tyne Valley Line, which runs between Newcastle and Carlisle via Hexham. The station, situated 19 miles 15 chains (19.2 mi; 30.9 km) west of Newcastle, serves the village of Corbridge in Northumberland, England. It is owned by Network Rail and managed by Northern Trains.

== History ==
The Newcastle and Carlisle Railway was formed in 1829, and was opened in stages. The station opened in March 1835, following the commencement of passenger trains between Blaydon and Hexham.

Corbridge was reduced to an unstaffed halt in 1967, along with most of the other stations on the line that escaped the Beeching Axe. The original station buildings on the eastbound platform remain as a private residence.

In 2013, the original wrought and cast iron pre-grouping footbridge was replaced with a modern steel structure, similar in appearance to that of the one it replaced.

In October 2019, a platform at the station was extended ahead of the introduction of new rolling stock, as part of the Great North Rail project.

== Facilities ==
The station has two platforms, both of which have a ticket machine (which accepts card or contactless payment only), seating, waiting shelter, next train audio and visual displays and an emergency help point. There is step-free access to the Newcastle-bound platform only. There is a small car park at the station.

Corbridge is part of the Northern Trains penalty fare network, meaning that a valid ticket or promise to pay notice is required prior to boarding the train.

== Services ==
As of the December 2025 timetable change, there is an hourly service between Newcastle and Hexham (or Carlisle on Sunday), with additional trains at peak times. All services are operated by Northern Trains.

Rolling stock used: Class 156 Super Sprinter and Class 158 Express Sprinter

Preceding station	National Rail	Following station
Riding Mill towards Newcastle	Northern Trains; Tyne Valley Line	Hexham towards Carlisle
	Historical railways	
Riding Mill	North Eastern Railway; Newcastle and Carlisle Railway	Hexham
