= Ethel Williams (physician) =

British physician and suffragist (1863–1948)

Ethel M. N. Williams
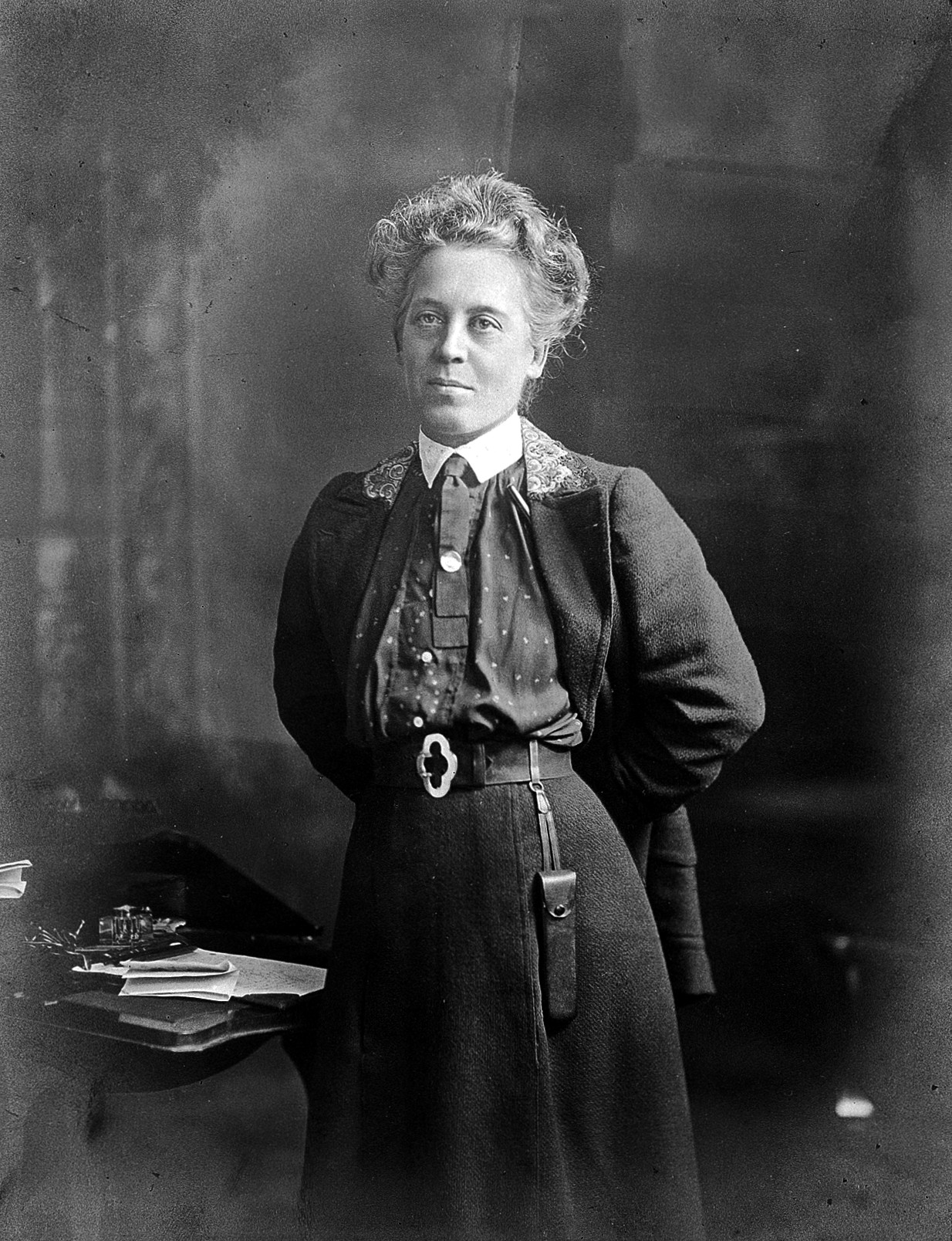
- Ethel M. N. Williams

Personal details
- Born: 8 July 1863 Cromer, England, United Kingdom of Great Britain and Ireland
- Died: January 29, 1948 (aged 84)
- Domestic partner: Frances Hardcastle
- Education: Norwich High School for Girls; London School of Medicine for Women
- Alma mater: Newnham College, Cambridge
- Occupation: Medical doctor, suffragist, and pacifist

Ethel Mary Nucella Williams (8 July 1863 – 29 January 1948) was the first female doctor in Newcastle upon Tyne, a suffragist and pacifist.

== Early life and education ==
Ethel Mary Nucella Williams was born on 8 July 1863 in Cromer, Norfolk. She was educated at Norwich High School for Girls and then Newnham College, Cambridge.

Williams attended the London School of Medicine for Women and graduated in 1891. She had to gain her hospital experience abroad in Paris and Vienna, because at that time women were not permitted to train in British hospitals, and qualified in 1895. She also took the Cambridge Diploma in Public Health in 1899.

== Medical career ==
Williams began her medical career in London as the resident medical officer at the Clapham Maternity Hospital and the Blackfriars Dispensary for Women and Children. She then moved to the north-east of England, deciding to settle in Newscastle upon Tyne as it had the fewest doctors per capita of cities in the United Kingdom at the time.

Williams became the first female doctor practicing in the city of Newcastle upon Tyne. In 1906, she also became the first woman to found a general medical practice in the city, setting up in Ellison Place where she worked alongside fellow doctor Ethel Bentham.

In 1917, Williams co-founded the Northern Women's Hospital, which is now the Nuffield Health Clinic on Osborne Road. She retired in 1924 and left her practice to another female doctor, Mona MacNaughton.

During the Second World War she returned to Newcastle, volunteering at air raid shelters to provide medical aid to civilian casualties.

== Activism ==
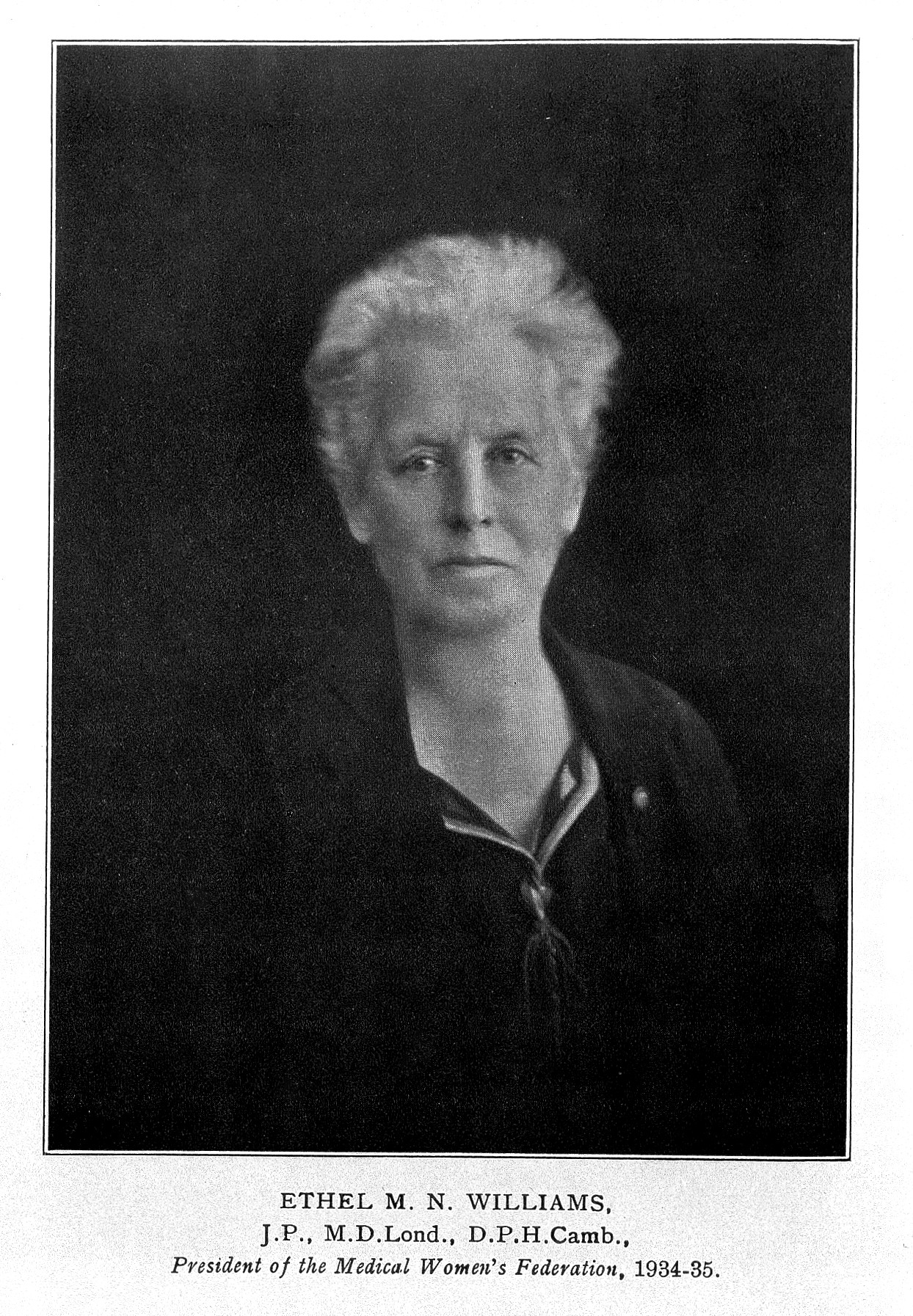
Photograph of Williams taken in commemoration of her presidency of the Medical Women's Federation, held at the Wellcome Collection in London

Williams was one of the initial members of the Medical Women's Federation, and was president in 1934 and 1935. She campaigned on issues relating to women and children's health. She conducted an inquiry into the condition of poor law children for the Fabian Society, which was published as an Appendix to the Report of the Royal Commission on the Poor Laws and Relief of Distress in 1910.

As a suffragist supporter of the campaign for women's enfranchisement, Williams became the president of the Newcastle and District Women's Suffrage Society when it was founded in 1900. It was renamed the North-Eastern Society for Women's Suffrage (NESWS) in 1905. Her suffragist banner from circa 1905 is one of the treasures of Newcastle University Library's Special Collections.

Williams was one of the over 3,000 women who took part in the 'Mud March' of 1907 in London, organised by the National Union of Woman's Suffrage Societies (NUWSS). When the 1911 census was taken, Williams participated in the suffragette boycott to evade being enumerated, and in 1912 she became a tax evader who withheld her taxes while the final readings in parliament of the Conciliation Bill took place. Williams was secretary of the Newcastle Women's Liberal Association, but left the Liberal Party in 1914, stating that they were "neither active nor hearty enough on the subject of the enfranchisement of women".

As a pacifist, Williams was a founder member of the Women's International League for Peace and Freedom, when it was established in 1917 during the First World War. She attended their international conference in Zurich, Switzerland, in May 1919.

Her obituary in the British Medical Journal states that Williams "distinguished herself in 1906 by being one of the first women in the North of England to drive a motor-car." She used her car as transport and means of spreading information about her political campaigns. An image of her in her car can be found in the Ethel Williams collection at the Newcastle University Library.

Williams was also a member of the Literary and Philosophical Society, became a tutor for the Workers' Educational Association, and served as a Justice of the Peace.

== Later life ==
Williams was the lifelong companion of Frances Hardcastle, an English mathematician and one of the founding members of the American Mathematical Society. Together with Hardcastle she built a house by the Northumberland moors at Stocksfield in which she spent her retirement. She became friendly with suffragette and later social worker and Tynemouth councillor Norah Balls through their interest in women's rights.

Williams died in 1948, leaving an estate valued at £31,659, equivalent to £995,256 in 2025.

== Commemoration ==
In 1950, Newcastle University opened new student accommodation named the Ethel Williams Halls of Residence in her memory. This building was demolished in the late 1990s and the residential street now occupying the site is called Williams Park.

In 2018, a plaque was placed at a house where she lived in Newcastle's Osborne Terrace, which reads, "ETHEL WILLIAMS / 1862–1948 / Lived and worked here 1910–1924. / Newcastle's first female general medical practitioner / A radical suffragist, pacifist, educationalist and / social welfare campaigner / Co-founded both / the Northern Women's Hospital and / the Medical Women's Federation / in 1917."
