= Station usage in Tyne and Wear =

This is a list of railway stations in Tyne and Wear, with estimated usage figures gathered from data collected by the Office of Rail and Road (ORR). As of April 2026, there are eight (Note: While Northumberland Park is open as of February 2026, it was not open during the previous ORR statistical period and has therefore been omitted.) National Rail stations located within the county of Tyne and Wear, from which around 12.20 million passenger journeys were made during 2024–25. There are also 60 Tyne and Wear Metro stations in the county, with around 32.2 million journeys made across the network during 2024–25.

Railway station usage in Tyne and Wear
Station	Usage ranking	Operated by	Constituency	Journey(s) 2024-25	Journey(s) 2023-24	Journey(s) 2022-23	Journey(s) 2021-22	Journey(s) 2020-21 (Note: Passenger figures during this period were significantly skewed due to the covid-19 pandemic as well as the 2019-20 and 2021-22 periods to a lesser extent.)	Journey(s) 2019-20	Journey(s) 2018–19	Journey(s) 2017–18	Journey(s) 2016–17	Journey(s) 2015–16
Newcastle	1	LNER	Newcastle upon Tyne Central and West	10,548,216	9,148,930	8,402,922	7,040,072	1,555,396	8,815,096	8,913,554	8,756,574	8,426,644	8,189,528
Sunderland	2	Northern Trains	Sunderland Central	709,098	598,916	481,814	385,822	107,250	427,014	441,554	447,694	483,836	475,172
MetroCentre	3	Northern Trains	Blaydon and Consett	632,322	518,700	320,764	287,294	61,036	298,940	301,738	335,076	350,376	354,240
Blaydon	4	Northern Trains	Blaydon and Consett	69,496	75,080	44,158	28,824	9,392	32,842	21,428	14,116	15,128	13,466
Manors	5	Northern Trains	Newcastle upon Tyne Central and West	63,914	35,892	18,940	14,420	3,858	17,346	12,980	9,068	9,404	7,614
Dunston	6	Northern Trains	Gateshead Central and Whickham	50,828	46,762	24,538	17,938	6,936	19,698	16,488	12,966	10,618	7,168
Heworth	7	Northern Trains	Jarrow and Gateshead East	45,528	45,120	29,148	27,412	10,786	23,454	22,588	21,064	20,784	18,898

== Gallery ==
Railway stations in Tyne and Wear
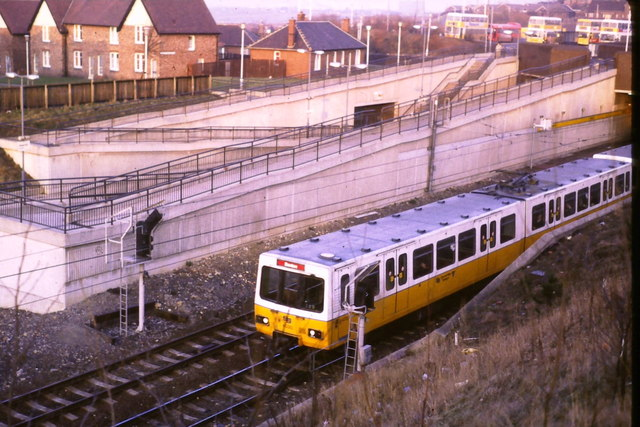
Heworth opened for British Rail services in November 1979, and the Tyne and Wear Metro in November 1981.

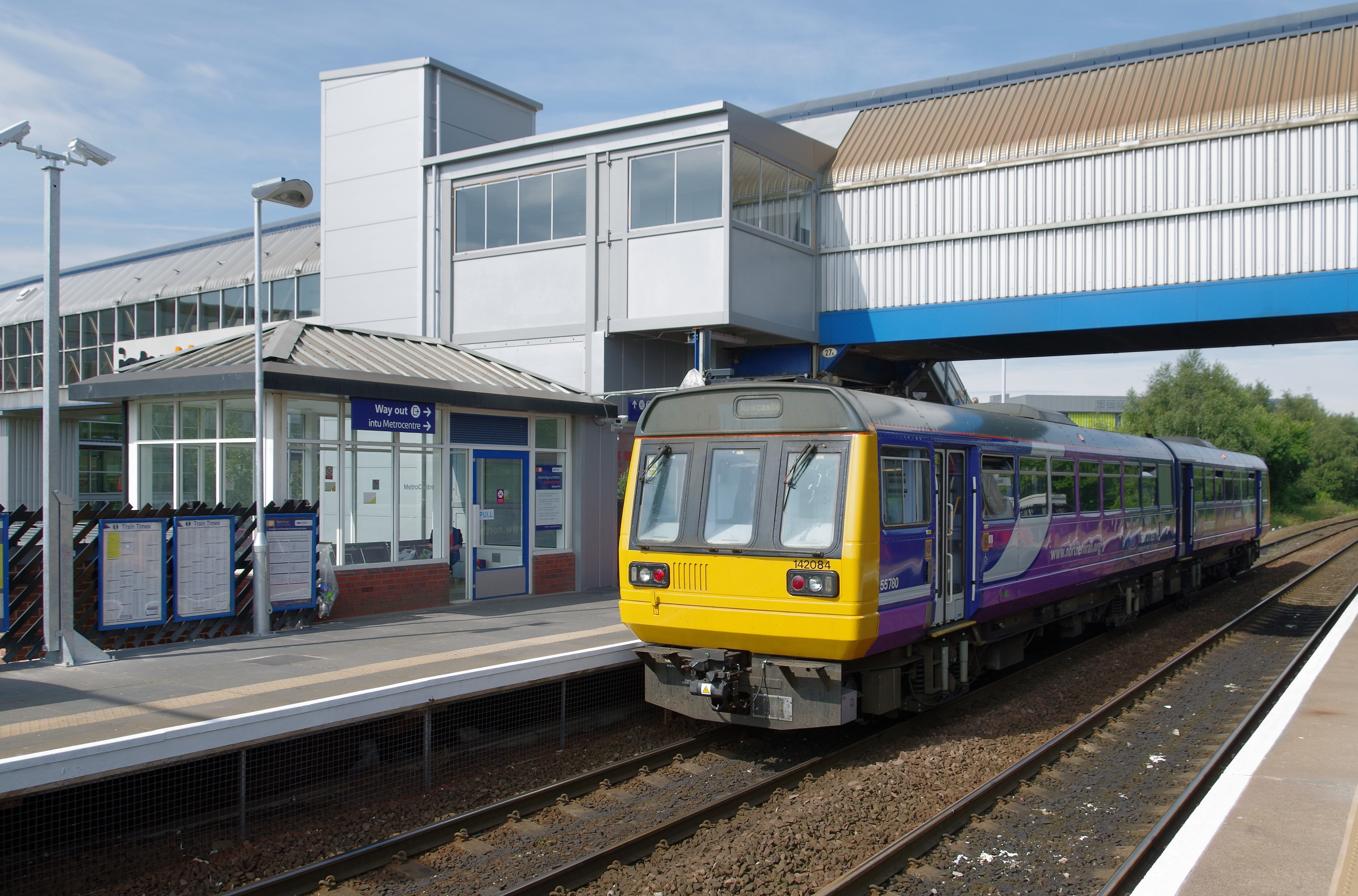
MetroCentre, on the Tyne Valley Line, opened in August 1987, and serves the Metrocentre in Gateshead.

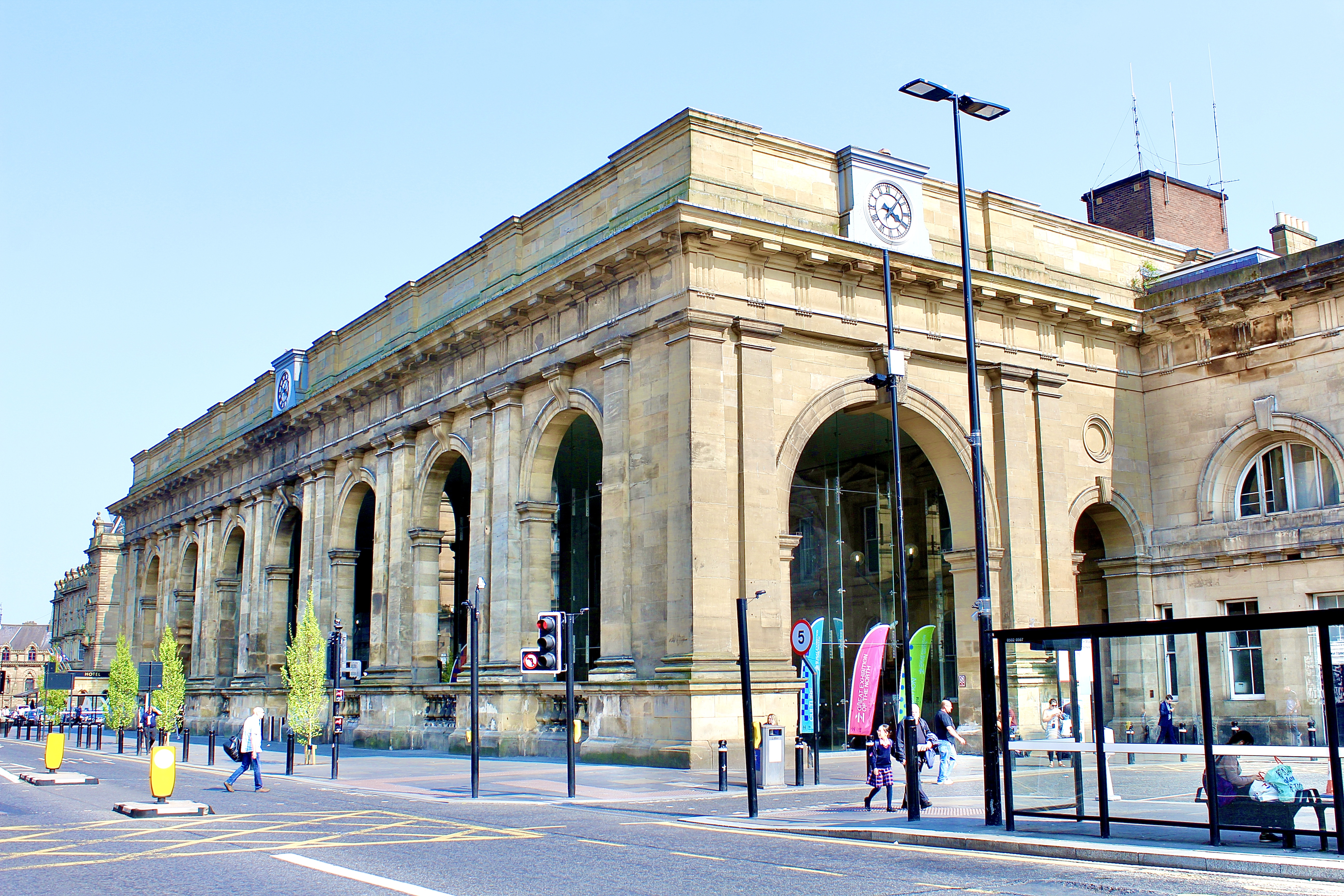
The station at Newcastle dates back to August 1850, and is the busiest railway station in Tyne and Wear.

== See also ==
- List of busiest railway stations in Great Britain
- List of Tyne and Wear Metro stations
