= Viscount Allendale =

Title in the peerage of the United Kingdom

Viscountcy of Allendale
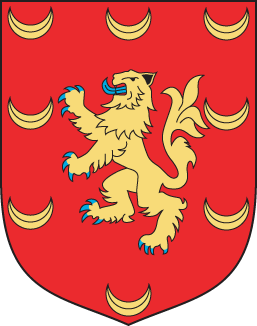
- Arms of Beaumont, Viscount Allendale: Gules, a lion rampant or armed and langued azure an orle of eight crescents of the second
- Creation date: 5 July 1911
- Created by: King George V
- Peerage: Peerage of the United Kingdom
- First holder: Wentworth Beaumont, 2nd Baron Allendale
- Present holder: Wentworth Beaumont, 4th Viscount
- Heir apparent: Wentworth Ambrose Ismay Beaumont
- Remainder to: the 1st Viscount's heirs male of the body lawfully begotten.
- Subsidiary titles: Baron Allendale

Viscount Allendale, of Allendale and Hexham in the County of Northumberland, is a title in the Peerage of the United Kingdom. It was created on 5 July 1911 for the Liberal politician Wentworth Beaumont, 2nd Baron Allendale. The title of Baron Allendale, of Allendale and Hexham in the County of Northumberland, had been created in the Peerage of the United Kingdom on 20 July 1906 for his father, the Yorkshire mining magnate and Liberal Member of Parliament, Wentworth Beaumont. The first Viscount's son, the second Viscount, notably served as Lord Lieutenant of Northumberland between 1949 and 1956. As of 2017 the titles are held by the latter's grandson, the fourth Viscount, who succeeded his father in 2002.

Several other members of the Beaumont family have also gained distinction. Thomas Wentworth Beaumont, father of the first Baron, was a politician. Hubert Beaumont, third son of the first Baron Allendale, was a Liberal politician. His grandson was Timothy Beaumont, Baron Beaumont of Whitley.

The family seats is Bywell Hall, in Bywell, Northumberland. They also formerly owned Stocksfield Hall, in Stocksfield, Northumberland, and Bretton Hall in West Yorkshire.

== Coat of arms ==
The heraldic blazon for the coat of arms of the viscountcy is: Gules, a lion rampant or armed and langued azure between eight crescents in orle of the second. This can be translated as: a red shield with a golden lion rampant with blue claws and tongue between eight golden crescents arranged around the edge of the shield.

== Barons Allendale (1906) ==
- Wentworth Blackett Beaumont, 1st Baron Allendale (1829–1907)
- Wentworth Canning Beaumont, 2nd Baron Allendale (created Viscount Allendale in 1911)

== Viscounts Allendale (1911) ==
- Wentworth Canning Beaumont, 1st Viscount Allendale (1860–1923)
- Wentworth Henry Canning Beaumont, 2nd Viscount Allendale (1890–1956)
- Wentworth Hubert Charles Beaumont, 3rd Viscount Allendale (1922–2002)
- Wentworth Peter Ismay Beaumont, 4th Viscount Allendale (born 1948)

The heir apparent is the present holder's son, Wentworth Ambrose Ismay Beaumont (born 1979).
The heir apparent's heir apparent is his son Wentworth Louis Canning Beaumont (born 2013).
