= Stocksfield railway station =

Railway station in Northumberland, England

Stocksfield
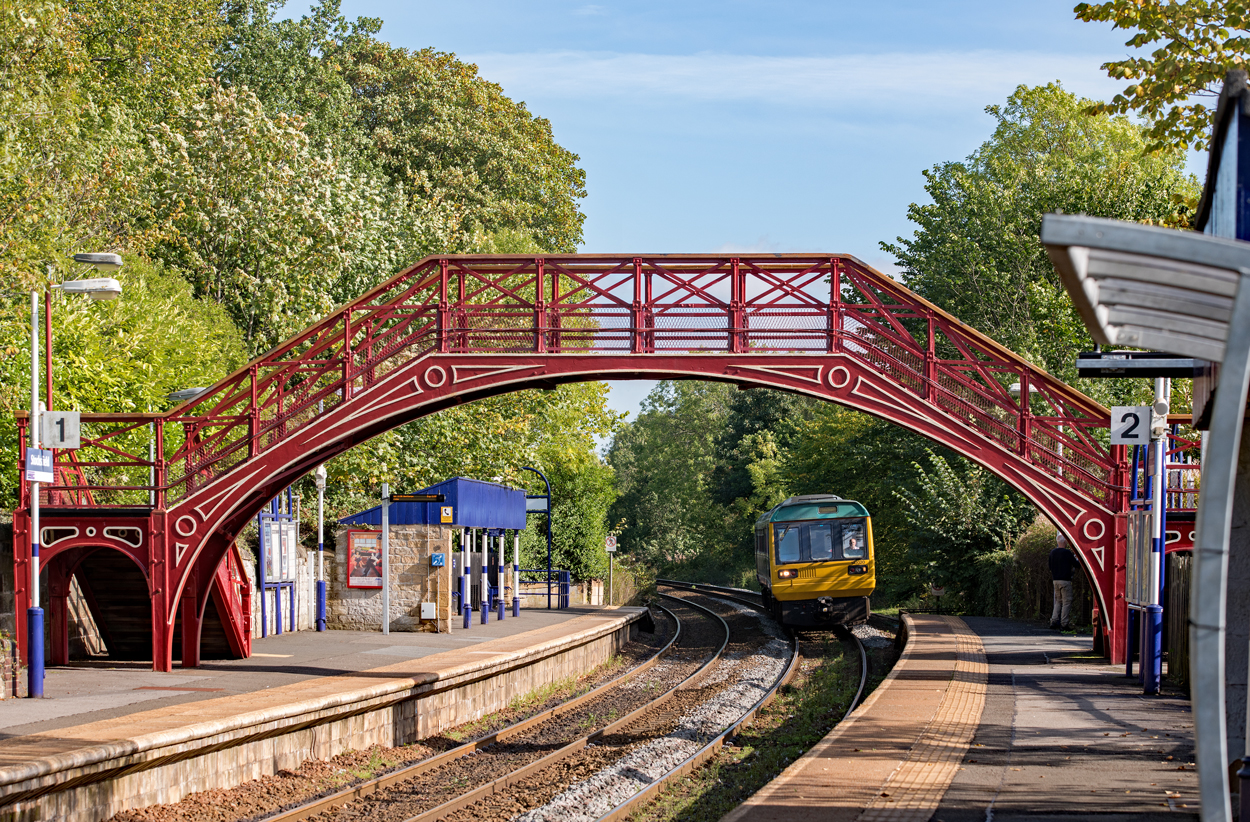

General information
- Location: Stocksfield, Northumberland; England
- Coordinates: 54°56′49″N 1°55′02″W
- Grid reference: NZ054613
- Owner: Network Rail
- Manager: Northern Trains
- Platforms: 2
- Tracks: 2

Other information
- Station code: SKS
- Classification: DfT category F2

History
- Original company: Newcastle and Carlisle Railway
- Pre-grouping: North Eastern Railway
- Post-grouping: London and North Eastern Railway; British Rail (North Eastern Region)

Key dates
- 9 March 1835: Opened

Passengers
- 2021/22: ▲33,298
- 2022/23: ▲38,864
- 2023/24: ▲47,858
- 2024/25: ▲52,404
- 2025/26: ▼47,706
Location
- Location within Northumberland
Notes
- Passenger statistics from the Office of Rail and Road

Stocksfield is a railway station on the Tyne Valley Line, which runs between Newcastle and Carlisle via Hexham. The station, situated 14 miles 47 chains (14.6 mi; 23.5 km) west of Newcastle, serves the parishes of Stocksfield and Bywell in Northumberland, England. It is owned by Network Rail and managed by Northern Trains.

== History ==
The Newcastle and Carlisle Railway was formed in 1829, and was opened in stages. The station opened in March 1835, following the commencement of passenger trains between Blaydon and Hexham.

Stocksfield was reduced to an unstaffed halt in 1967, along with most of the other stations on the line that escaped the Beeching Axe. The former station buildings were subsequently demolished.

== Facilities ==
The station has two platforms, both of which have seating, a waiting shelter and next train audio and visual displays. The westbound platform has a ticket machine, which accepts card or contactless payment only, and an emergency help point. Platforms are linked by a pre-grouping metal footbridge, similar to those at Riding Mill and Wylam, however there is step-free access to both platforms via the nearby road bridge. There is a small car park and cycle storage at the station.

Stocksfield is part of the Northern Trains penalty fare network, meaning that a valid ticket or promise to pay notice is required prior to boarding the train.

== Services ==
As of the December 2025 timetable change, there is an hourly service between Newcastle and Hexham (or Carlisle on Sunday), with additional trains at peak times. All services are operated by Northern Trains.

Rolling stock used: Class 156 Super Sprinter and Class 158 Express Sprinter

Preceding station	National Rail	Following station
Prudhoe towards Newcastle	Northern Trains; Tyne Valley Line	Riding Mill towards Carlisle
	Historical railways	
Mickley	North Eastern Railway; Newcastle and Carlisle Railway	Riding Mill
