= Northumberland Fire and Rescue Service =

Fire and rescue service in north-east England

Operational area
- Country: England
- County: Northumberland

Agency overview
- Established: 1 April 1974
- Annual calls: 3,797 (2022–2023)
- Employees: 462
- Annual budget: £14.1 million
- Chief Fire Officer: Keith Carruthers

Facilities and equipment
- Stations: 15
- Engines: 22

Website
- www.northumberlandfireandrescue.gov.uk

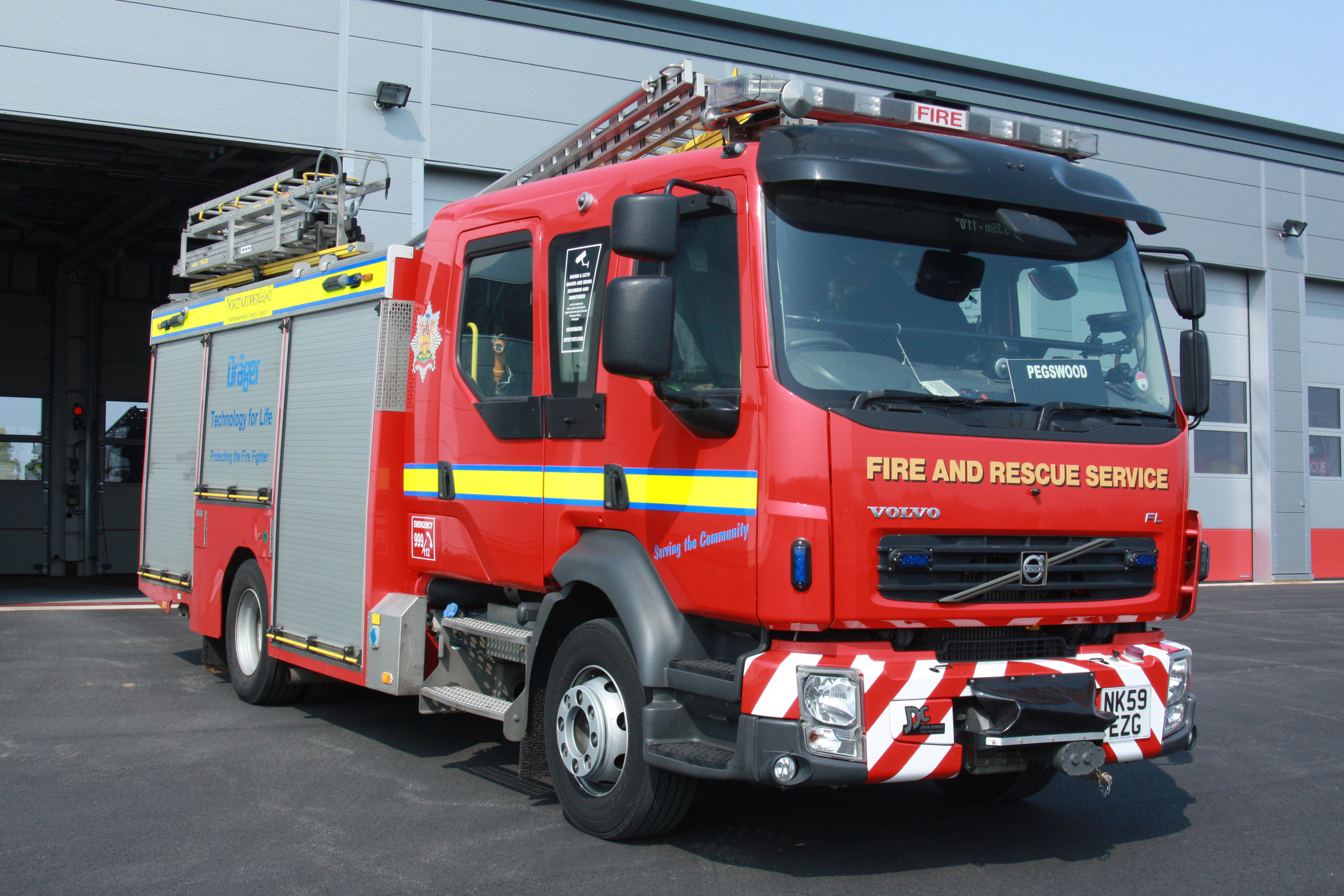
Northumberland Fire appliance

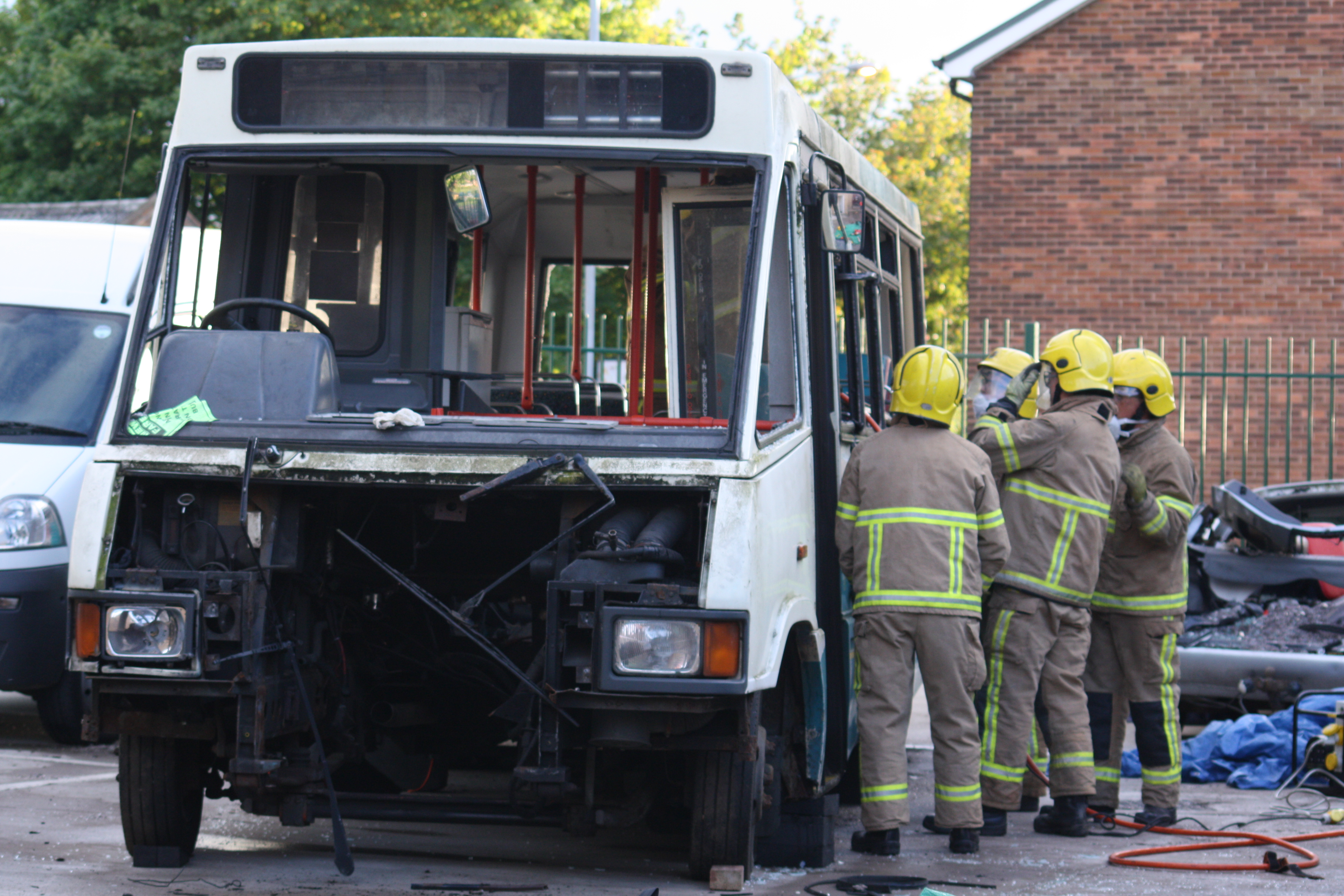
An Optare Metrorider being used for fire training by the Northumberland Fire and Rescue Service in 2010.

Northumberland Fire and Rescue Service (NFRS) is the statutory fire and rescue service for the county of Northumberland in North East England. Its headquarters are co-located with West Hartford fire station in Cramlington.

== History ==
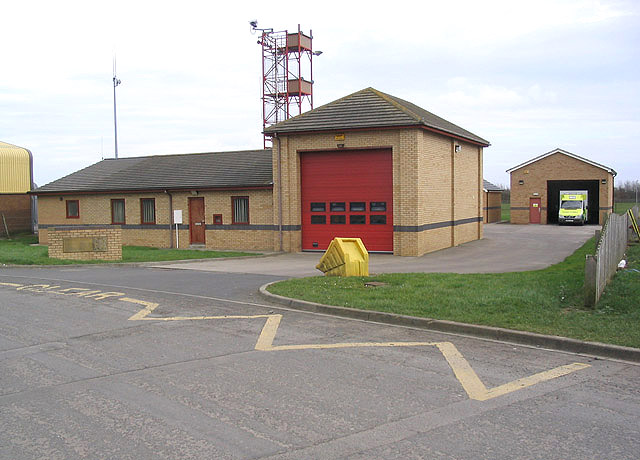
Amble fire station

The Northumberland Fire Brigade (NFB) was formed in 1948 from the many local fire services located in the traditional county of Northumbria, between the Tyne and the Tweed rivers. The Local Government Reorganisation act (1971), which came into effect in 1974, saw the transfer of four of the busiest NFB stations (Gosforth, Newburn, Wallsend and Whitley Bay), into the newly formed Tyne and Wear Fire and Rescue Service. This also prompted a name change to Northumberland County Fire Brigade.

The current name was adopted in 1982, reflecting the type of callouts the service was receiving. Between 1966 and 2010, the brigade's headquarters had been in Morpeth, however, in June 2010, a new headquarters building and fire station was opened up at West Hartford in Cramlington. The headquarters, together with a new fire station at Pegswood and other fire stations across the North East region, were constructed as part of a £27 million private finance initiative (PFI) project initiated by the North East Fire and Rescue Authority.

Annual callouts for the service average around 3,800. In the period from October 2017 to September 2018, Northumberland had 3,797 callouts of which 1,674 were fires and 1,278 were false alarms.

== Performance ==
Every fire and rescue service in England and Wales is periodically subjected to a statutory inspection by His Majesty's Inspectorate of Constabulary and Fire & Rescue Services (HMICFRS). The inspections investigate how well the service performs in each of three areas. On a scale of outstanding, good, requires improvement and inadequate, Northumberland Fire and Rescue Service was rated as follows:

HMICFRS Inspection Northumberland
Area	Rating 2018/19	Rating 2021/22	Description
Effectiveness	Requires improvement	Requires improvement	How effective is the fire and rescue service at keeping people safe and secure from fire and other risks?
Efficiency	Requires improvement	Requires improvement	How efficient is the fire and rescue service at keeping people safe and secure from fire and other risks?
People	Requires improvement	Requires improvement	How well does the fire and rescue service look after its people?

== Fire stations and appliances ==
The service's fire stations, which are crewed by wholetime firefighters, retained firefighters, or a combination of the two, are listed below. Some of the stations are shared with other organisations. There are 15 fire stations, excluding the garage on Holy Island, staffed by 141 full time firefighters and 143 retained firefighters.

Station	Duty system	Appliances	Notes
Allendale	Retained	fire appliance, multi-purpose 4x4 vehicle	Sure Start
Alnwick	Retained	2x fire appliances,multi-purpose 4x4,Command support Unit	
Amble	Retained	fire appliance, multi-purpose 4x4 vehicle	North East Ambulance Service
Belford	Retained	fire appliance, multi-purpose 4x4 vehicle	
Bellingham	Retained	fire appliance, multi-purpose 4x4 vehicle	Northumbria Police; Sure Start
Berwick	Day crewed / Retained	2x fire appliances, multi-purpose 4x4 vehicle, swift water rescue team, animal rescue equipment, decontamination shower, air shelter, explosimeter, oversized drums for safely dealing with chemical incidents	
Haltwhistle	Retained	fire appliance, multi-purpose 4x4 vehicle	
Hexham	Day crewed / Retained	2x fire appliances, multi-purpose 4x4 vehicle, swift water rescue team, animal rescue equipment, decontamination shower, explosimeter, gas detection monitor, oversized drums for safely dealing with chemical incidents, radiation contamination meter	
Holy Island	Unstaffed garage (crewed from neighbouring stations)	fire appliance	
Pegswood	Wholetime / Retained	3x fire appliances, multi-purpose 4x4 vehicle, high volume pumping unit, swift water rescue team, flood prevention unit,Aerial Ladder Platform, animal rescue equipment, environmental protection equipment, oversized drums for safely dealing with chemical incidents, radiation contamination meter	Northumberland National Park mountain rescue team.; Northumberland Probation Service; Sure Start
Ponteland	Retained	fire appliance, multi-purpose 4x4 vehicle, Betsy water pumping unit	Opened in March 2021
Prudhoe	Retained	fire appliance, multi-purpose 4x4 vehicle	North East Ambulance Service
Rothbury	Retained	fire appliance, multi-purpose 4x4 vehicle	Sure Start (opened in 2010)
Seahouses	Retained	fire appliance, multi-purpose 4x4 vehicle	Sure Start
West Hartford	Wholetime	2x fire appliances, multi-purpose 4x4 vehicles, multi-purpose vans, multiple light support vehicles, minibus, fire investigation unit, incident response unit, snow plough and gritter units, wildfire unit, specialist rescue unit, animal response equipment, dams and portable reservoirs, decontamination shower, air shelter, crowd barriers, forklift truck, oversized drums for safely dealing with chemical incidents, radiation contamination meter	North East Ambulance Service & Northumberland Fire and Rescue Service headquarters - opened in 2010
Wooler	Retained	fire appliance, multi-purpose 4x4 vehicle	Sure Start

The fire station at Haydon Bridge closed in 2016.

== See also ==
- Fire service in the United Kingdom
- List of British firefighters killed in the line of duty
