= Tyne Valley Line =

Railway line in north of England

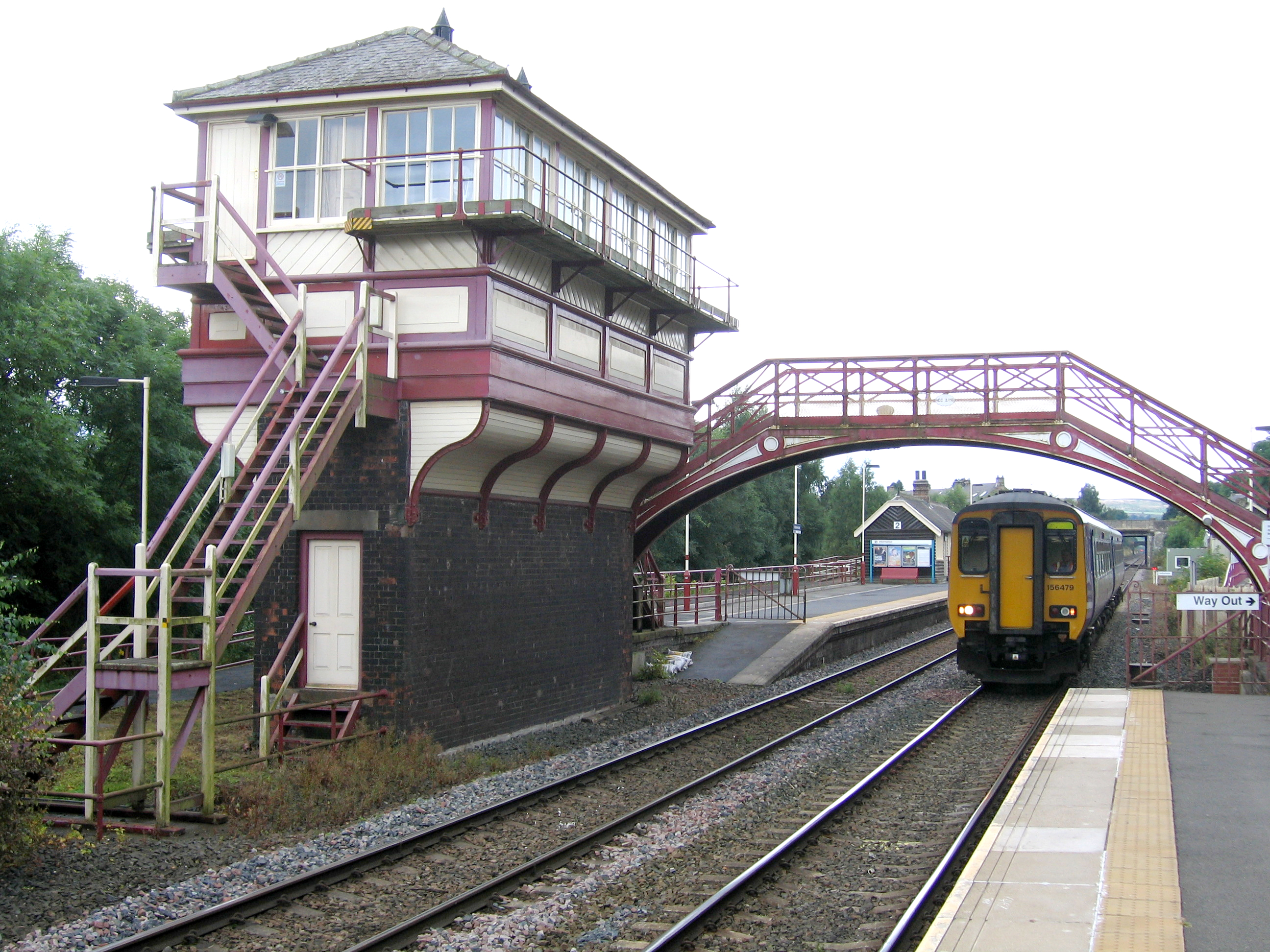
- A train passes the signal box at Haltwhistle Station.

Overview
- Status: Operational
- Owner: Network Rail
- Locale: Cumbria; Northumberland; Tyne and Wear
- Termini: Newcastle; Carlisle
- Connecting lines: Cumbrian Coast Line; Durham Coast Line; East Coast Main Line; Glasgow South Western Line; Settle and Carlisle Line; West Coast Main Line
- Former connections: Border Counties Railway (1858–1963); Derwent Valley Railway (1867–1963); Haltwhistle and Alston Railway (1852–1976); Hexham and Allendale Railway (1867–1950)
- Stations: 16

Service
- Type: Heavy rail
- System: National Rail
- Operator: Northern Trains
- Depot: Heaton
- Rolling stock: Class 156 Super Sprinter; Class 158 Express Sprinter

History
- Work began: 1834
- Completed: 1838

Technical
- Line length: 58 miles (93 km)
- Number of tracks: 2
- Track gauge: 4 ft 8 1/2 in (1,435 mm) standard gauge
- Loading gauge: W7
- Operating speed: 60–65 mph (97–105 km/h)
Route map
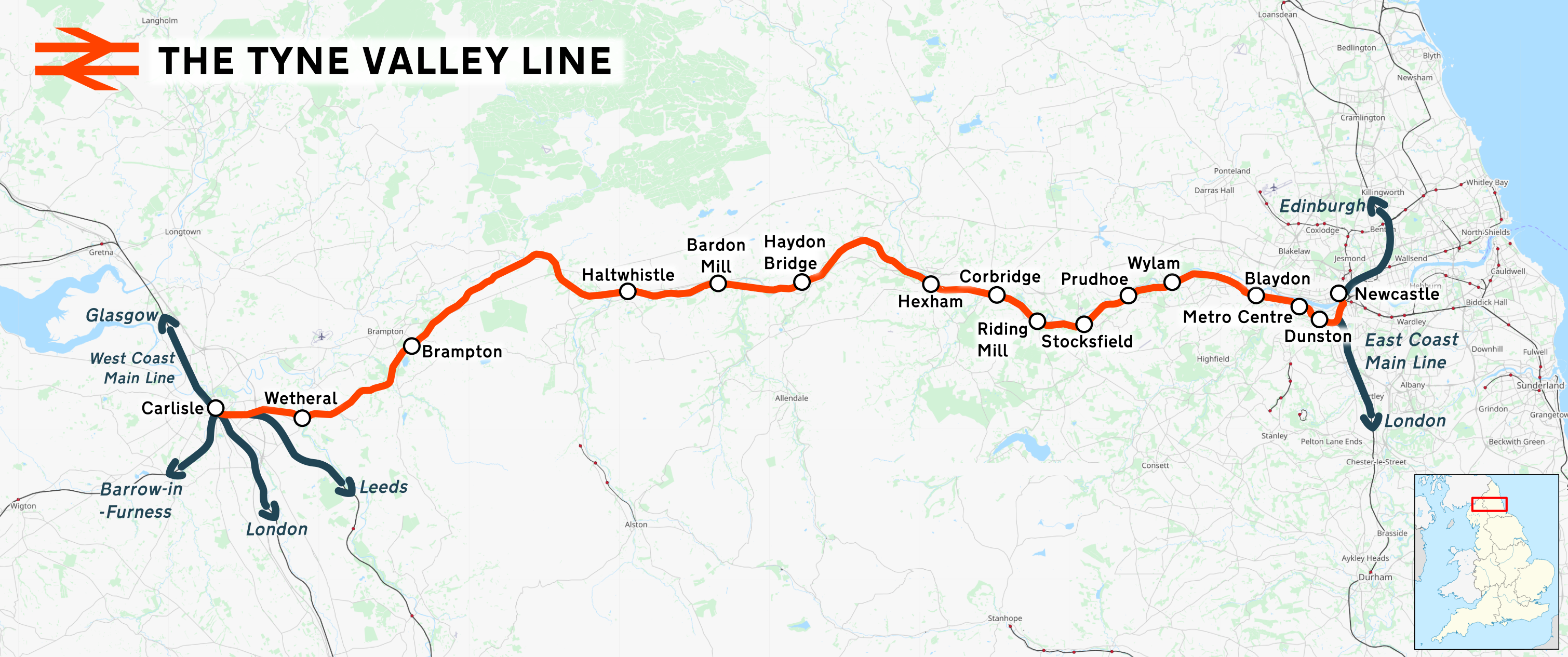
(Click to expand)

The Tyne Valley Line is a 58-mile (93 km) route, linking Newcastle upon Tyne with Hexham and Carlisle, England. The line follows the course of the River Tyne through Tyne and Wear and Northumberland. Five stations and two viaducts on the route are listed structures.

The Newcastle and Carlisle Railway was formed in 1829, and was opened in stages between 1834 and 1838.

== Services ==
As of the December 2019 change, Northern Trains run three trains per hour along the Tyne Valley Line between Newcastle and Hexham, with two trains per hour continuing to Carlisle.

Predominantly, rolling stock on the Tyne Valley Line consists of Class 156 and Class 158 diesel multiple units, both of which were introduced in to service in the late 1980s.

Class 142 Pacer trains also served the line until their withdrawal from passenger service in 2020.

The Class 156 and 158 units operating on the Tyne Valley Line are currently in the process of being refurbished, with upgrades including free WiFi, power sockets, on-board passenger information displays, and an interior refresh.

The Tyne Valley Line is also used for freight, and is an important diversionary route at times when the East Coast Main Line is closed. The line, however, is not electrified.

== History ==
Newcastle-upon-Tyne and Carlisle Railway Act 1829
- Act of Parliament
- Parliament of the United Kingdom
- Long title: An Act for making and maintaining a Railway or Tramroad from the Town of Newcastle-upon-Tyne in the County of the Town of Newcastle-upon-Tyne to the City of Carlisle in the County of Cumberland, with a Branch thereout.
- Citation: 10 Geo. 4. c. lxxii

Dates
- Royal assent: 22 May 1829

Status: Amended

The railway was built by the Newcastle and Carlisle Railway, with the requisite act of Parliament, the Newcastle-upon-Tyne and Carlisle Railway Act 1829 (10 Geo. 4. c. lxxii) gaining royal assent on 22 May 1829.

The line was built in sections from 1834 onwards. The first section of the line (running between Hexham and Blaydon) opened in March 1835. Services were soon temporarily suspended, until May 1835, after a local landowner objected to the use of locomotives (this being specifically prohibited by the act of Parliament).

The entire route between Carlisle London Road and Redheugh in Gateshead was formally opened to passengers on 18 June 1838. A temporary bridge over the River Tyne was built at Scotswood, in order to allow trains to reach a terminus at Forth Banks in Newcastle, with this section of the line opening on 21 October 1839. The line was later extended to Newcastle Central, with the first service operating on 1 January 1851.

The Newcastle and Carlisle Railway was absorbed into the North Eastern Railway on 17 July 1862. From 1864, trains ran to Carlisle Citadel station, with Carlisle London Road closed. In 1870, the temporary bridge at Scotswood was removed, and a new iron Scotswood Bridge was built to replace it.

In 1982, British Rail closed the Scotswood Bridge, which had become uneconomic to maintain. Trains on the Tyne Valley Line from Newcastle were diverted to use the present route, crossing the King Edward VII Bridge to the south-west of the station, before running through Dunston and Blaydon, on an upgraded section of the original route along the south bank of the Tyne that had previously been freight-only since the 1850s.

After being proposed for closure in the Beeching report Gilsland station was closed to passengers on 2 January 1967. Goods facilities were withdrawn on 5 April 1965. There have been multiple attempts to reopen this station, the most recent being a bid to the Restoring Your Railway fund in March 2020. All attempts so far have proven to be unsuccessful.

The line near Carlisle was badly damaged in October 2022 when a freight train derailed.

== Route ==
After leaving Newcastle, the line originally ran along the north bank of the River Tyne for around 4 miles (6.4 km), serving the Sir W. G. Armstrong & Co. works at Elswick, before crossing the River Tyne at Scotswood, and rejoining its current route along the south bank from Blaydon.

Since 1982, after leaving Newcastle, the line crosses the River Tyne using the King Edward VII Bridge, before then diverging from the southbound East Coast Main Line, and running west through Gateshead, with stations at Dunston, MetroCentre and Blaydon.

At Wylam, the line enters Northumberland. The station house at Wylam was built in 1835, and is now a Grade II* listed building. The line continues along the south bank of the River Tyne, with further intermediate stops in Northumberland located at Prudhoe, Stocksfield, Riding Mill, Corbridge, Hexham, Haydon Bridge, Bardon Mill and Haltwhistle.

A diversion at Corbridge, opened on 27 May 1962, allowed straightening of the line to remove a 45 mph (70 km/h) speed limit and the closure of the 510-foot (160 m) long Farnley Scar Tunnel, which was in need of further reinforcement.

In Cumbria, the line serves Brampton (Cumbria) and Wetheral stations, before joining with the Settle and Carlisle Line just before Carlisle.

=== Scotswood, Newburn and Wylam Railway ===
The Scotswood, Newburn and Wylam Railway (or North Wylam Loop) was a 6.5-mile (10.5 km) long double-track branch line constructed for colliery and passenger traffic.

The line diverged from the original Newcastle & Carlisle Railway at Scotswood, before running along the north bank of the River Tyne, with stations at Newburn, Lemington, Heddon-on-the-Wall and North Wylam. The line then crossed the River Tyne using the Wylam Railway Bridge, rejoining the Newcastle & Carlisle Railway again at the West Wylam Junction.

The line followed the course of a waggonway between North Wylam and Lemington Staithes, which had been in operation since 1748 and was used for taking coal from the collieries in Wylam and Walbottle to a part of the river which could be accessed by keel boats.

On 16 June 1871, Parliament gave permission for the line to be built. Construction of the new line began in April 1872, with the line between Scotswood and Newburn opening on 12 July 1875. It was operated by North Eastern Railway on behalf of the Scotswood, Newburn and Wylam Railway.

On 13 May 1876, the line between Newburn and North Wylam opened, with the final section of the branch between North Wylam and the West Wylam Junction opening in October 1876.

On 15 September 1958, the stations at Newburn, Lemington and Heddon-on-the-Wall closed to passengers, with the latter also closing to goods on that day.

On 4 January 1960, Lemington closed to goods traffic, with Newburn closing to goods traffic on 24 April 1965. Scotswood followed, closing to goods two days later.

Between 1965 and 1966, this line carried all rail traffic between Newcastle and Carlisle, while a section of the main line between Scotswood and Blaydon was closed.

Elswick closed to passengers on 2 January 1967, with Scotswood closing to passengers on 1 May 1967. The last station on the line to remain open, North Wylam, closed along with the rest of the line on 11 March 1968.

The track between Newburn and Wylam Railway Bridge was removed in 1975, and the course was landscaped and made into a public bridleway. The track between Scotswood and Newburn remained, in order to take rail traffic to and from Stella North Power Station, as well as the BEREC factory in Newburn. The track was later removed, following the closure of the factory in 1992.

=== Branch lines ===
Originally, the railway had four passenger branch lines leading off it:

- The Border Counties Railway branched off just west of Hexham, passing through Kielder and the North Tyne Valley, before joining up with the Scottish rail network at Riccarton Junction. It was also linked to the Wansbeck Valley Railway, which ran from Reedsmouth to Morpeth, and connected to the branch line from Rothbury. The Border Counties Railway closed to passengers in 1956, and to all other traffic in 1958 (five years before the Beeching Axe). A small section of track between Reedsmouth and Bellingham was retained, accessed from the Wansbeck Valley Railway, until the latter shut in the mid-1960s. Some of the former trackbed is now lost beneath Kielder Reservoir, although the disused Kielder Viaduct remains a prominent local landmark.
- The Allendale branch ran south-west from Hexham Junction, and was primarily used to carry minerals from mines and quarries around Allendale and the village of Langley. The line never proved popular, with passenger services ending in 1930, and closing completely in 1953.
- The Alston branch covered 17 miles (27 km), running from the town of Haltwhistle. This branch provided a passenger service and also, in the early days, served the hundreds of lead mines in the upper South Tyne Valley. It included the monumental Lambley Viaduct, and was the last of the branch lines to close in 1976. Part of the former line between Slaggyford and Alston now operates as a narrow gauge heritage railway, the South Tynedale Railway.
- There was a short branch (closed to passengers in 1923) from Brampton to Brampton Town. The junction of this railway, Brampton Junction, also linked to Lord Carlisle's Railway, a primarily industrial branch line, pre-dating the Newcastle & Carlisle Railway, which also linked into the Alston branch at Lambley.

== Accidents and incidents ==
- 1926, Naworth level crossing accident - nine killed, six injured.
