= Blaydon railway station =

Railway station in Tyne and Wear, England

Blaydon
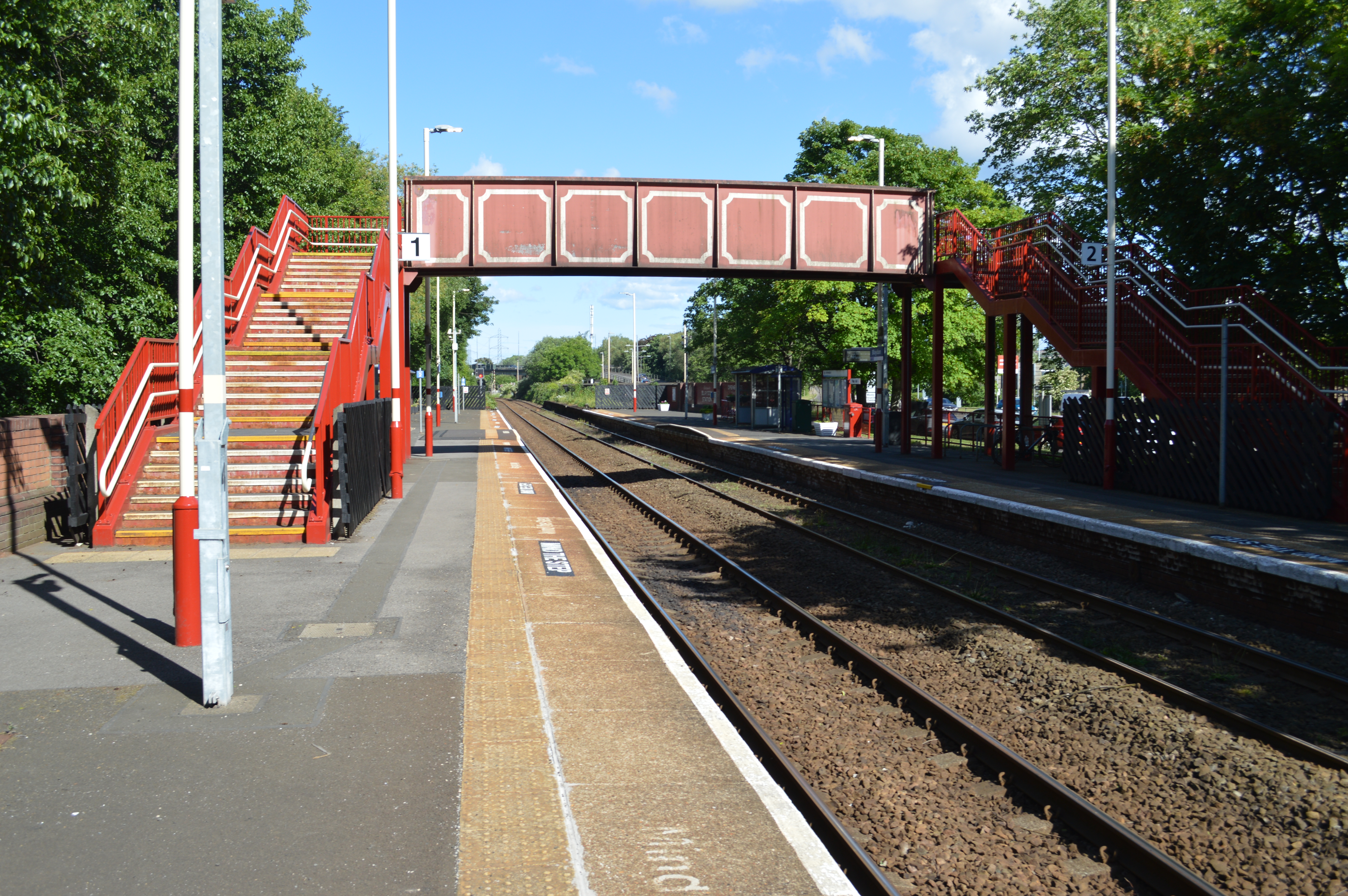

General information
- Location: Blaydon, Metropolitan Borough of Gateshead; England
- Coordinates: 54°57′57″N 1°42′46″W
- Grid reference: NZ184635
- Owner: Network Rail
- Manager: Northern Trains
- Transit authority: Tyne and Wear PTE
- Platforms: 2
- Tracks: 2

Other information
- Station code: BLO
- Classification: DfT category F2

History
- Original company: Newcastle and Carlisle Railway
- Pre-grouping: North Eastern Railway
- Post-grouping: London and North Eastern Railway; British Rail (North Eastern Region)

Key dates
- 9 March 1835: Opened
- 3 September 1966: Closed
- 1 May 1967: Reopened

Passengers
- 2020/21: ▼9,392
- 2021/22: ▲28,824
- 2022/23: ▲44,158
- 2023/24: ▲75,080
- 2024/25: ▼69,496
Location
- Location within Tyne and Wear
Notes
- Passenger statistics from the Office of Rail and Road

Blaydon is a railway station on the Tyne Valley Line, which runs between Newcastle and Carlisle via Hexham. The station, situated 5 miles 39 chains (5.49 mi; 8.83 km) west of Newcastle, serves the town of Blaydon, Gateshead in Tyne and Wear, England. It is owned by Network Rail and managed by Northern Trains.

== History ==
The Newcastle and Carlisle Railway was formed in 1829, and was opened in stages. The station opened in March 1835, following the commencement of passenger trains between Blaydon and Hexham. Initially serving as the line's eastern terminus, through services to Redheugh began in March 1837.

A second cross-river line, operating over the Scotswood Bridge to a temporary terminus near the site of Newcastle Central was opened in 1839, diverging immediately east of the station. It was not until January 1851 that Newcastle Central would be accessible using this route.

The station was enlarged on the opening of the Derwent Valley Railway in 1867, with Blaydon Junction opening to its east; this enabled trains to run to Blackhill, Consett and Durham. This line closed to passengers in the 1950s, before fully closing in November 1963.

Blaydon was substantially rebuilt in 1912, with new red brick station buildings and glass canopies. In 1969, the station became an unstaffed halt, and the canopies were removed. The station buildings were demolished in 1977, due to neglect and persistent vandalism. Service levels were also infrequent for many years, with only a small number of services calling at peak times. Since 2013 however, the timetable has been upgraded and more trains now call (with a consequent improvement in usage, as can be seen in the statistics)

Services over Scotswood Bridge were withdrawn on 4 October 1982, with the line re-routed through Dunston and across the King Edward VII Bridge, using part of the original 1837 route, which had since only been used by freight. Few traces of the former line now remain, though the position of the station signal box gives a clue as to the old alignment.

== Facilities ==
The station has two platforms, both of which have a ticket machine (which accepts card or contactless payment only), seating, waiting shelter, next train audio and visual displays and an emergency help point. There is step-free access to both platforms, with platforms also linked by a footbridge. There is a small car park and cycle storage at the station.

Blaydon is part of the Northern Trains penalty fare network, meaning that a valid ticket or promise to pay notice is required prior to boarding the train.

== Services ==
As of the December 2025 timetable change:

On Mondays to Saturdays, there is an hourly service between Newcastle and Hexham, with additional trains at peak times. Many of these peak services extend to/from Middlesbrough or Nunthorpe, via Hartlepool, and Carlisle, while some westbound services also terminate at Prudhoe and one train a day extends eastbound to Morpeth. On Sundays, there is an hourly service, with services extending through to/from Carlisle to Newcastle. All services are operated by Northern Trains.

Rolling stock used: Class 156 Super Sprinter and Class 158 Express Sprinter

| Preceding station | National Rail | Following station |
|---|---|---|
| MetroCentre towards Newcastle | Northern Trains; Tyne Valley Line | Wylam towards Carlisle |
| | Historical railways | |
| Scotswood | North Eastern Railway; Newcastle and Carlisle Railway | Ryton |
