= Scotswood Works Halt railway station =

Disused railway station in Benwell and Scotswood, Newcastle-upon-Tyne

Scotswood Works Halt

General information
- Location: Scotswood, Newcastle-upon-Tyne; England
- Coordinates: 54.967273°N 1.678129°W
- Grid reference: NZ207636
- Platforms: 2

Other information
- Status: Disused

History
- Original company: North Eastern Railway (United Kingdom)
- Post-grouping: LNER

Key dates
- 25 August 1915: Opened
- 27 September 1924: Closed to passengers
- 7 April 1941: Station reopened
- 1944: Closed
Location

Scotswood Works Halt railway station served the area of Scotswood, Newcastle-upon-Tyne, England from 1915 to 1944 on the Tyne Valley Line.

== History ==
The station opened on 25 August 1915 by the North Eastern Railway. The station was situated between Scotswood Road and Coanwood Road. It was originally opened for workers in the First World War in the Armstrong Whitworth's munitions factory. The halt was enlarged by the Ministry of Munitions due to the high number of traffic. After the workforce's decline, Armstrong Whitworth acquired the government's interest in the platforms and buildings and offered them to LNER. The station was first closed on 27 September 1924 but reopened on 7 April 1941 to serve the munitions workforce again, but closed again in 1944.

Preceding station	Historical railways	Following station
Elswick; Line and station closed	North Eastern Railway; Tyne Valley Line	Scotswood; Line and station closed
