= MetroCentre railway station =

Railway station in Tyne and Wear, England

MetroCentre
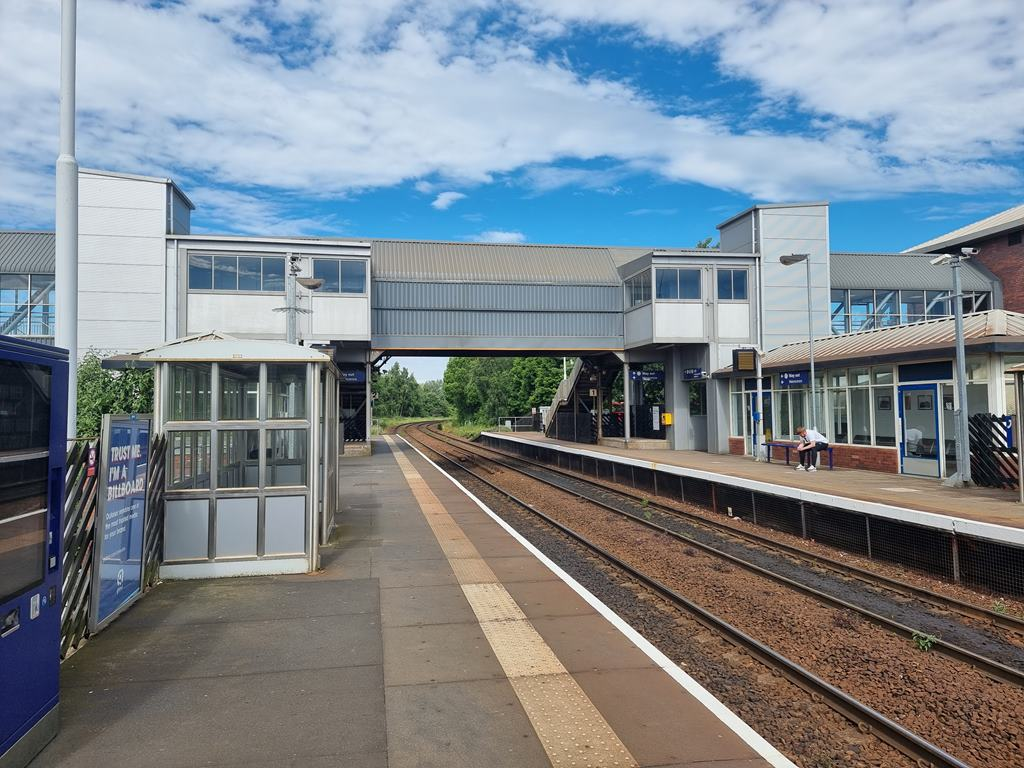

General information
- Location: Metrocentre, Gateshead; England
- Coordinates: 54°57′32″N 1°39′54″W
- Grid reference: NZ215627
- Owner: Network Rail
- Manager: Northern Trains
- Transit authority: Tyne and Wear PTE
- Platforms: 2
- Tracks: 2

Other information
- Station code: MCE

History
- Original company: British Rail (Eastern Region)

Key dates
- 3 August 1987: Opened as Gateshead MetroCentre
- 17 May 1993: Renamed MetroCentre

Passengers
- 2020/21: ▼61,036
- 2021/22: ▲0.287 million
- 2022/23: ▲0.321 million
- 2023/24: ▲0.519 million
- 2024/25: ▲0.632 million
Location
- Location within Tyne and Wear
Notes
- Passenger statistics from the Office of Rail and Road

MetroCentre is a railway station on the Tyne Valley Line, which runs between Newcastle and Carlisle via Hexham. The station, situated 3 miles 33 chains (3.41 mi; 5.49 km) west of Newcastle, between Dunston and Blaydon, serving the MetroCentre shopping centre, Gateshead in Tyne and Wear, England. It is owned by Network Rail and managed by Northern Trains.

== History ==
The station was opened on 3 August 1987 by British Rail, and was initially named Gateshead MetroCentre. The station's name was shortened to MetroCentre on 17 May 1993.

The station is situated on a section of line built by the North Eastern Railway, which was constructed in sections between 1893 and 1909. It linked the lines over the newly commissioned King Edward VII Bridge with the original Newcastle and Carlisle Railway freight route to Redheugh and Dunston Coal Staiths, dating back to 1837.

Between January and February 2020, the platforms at the station were extended ahead of the introduction of upgraded rolling stock, as part of the Great North Rail project.

== Facilities ==
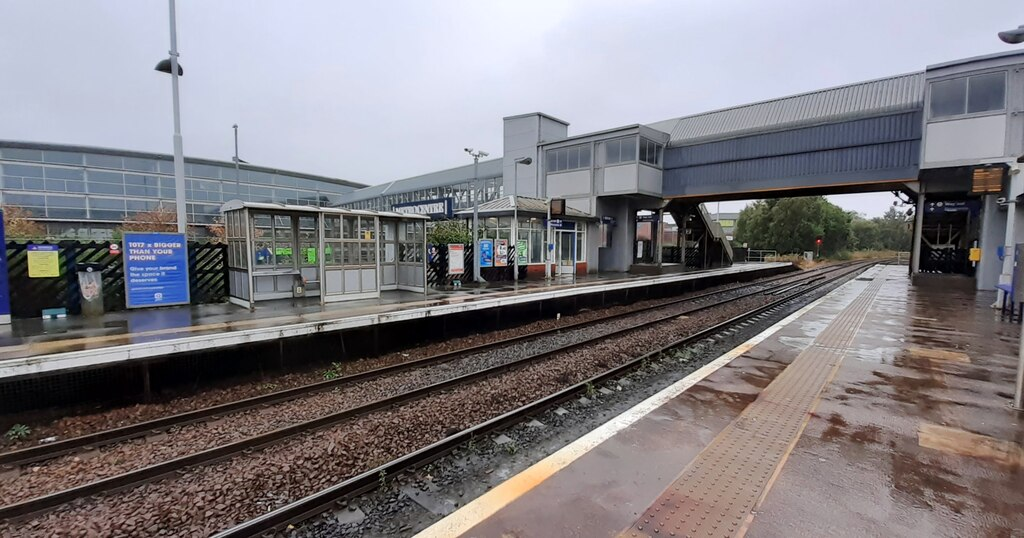
The station seen in 2024

The station has two platforms, both of which have seating, a waiting shelter, next train audio and visual displays and an emergency help point. There is a footbridge linking the station with the Metrocentre, which provides step-free access to both platforms.

MetroCentre has recently joined the Northern Trains penalty fare network, as new ticket machines were installed at the station in December 2020.

== Passenger volume ==
Passenger Volume at Metrocentre
	2002–03	2004–05	2005–06	2006–07	2007–08	2008–09	2009–10	2010–11	2011–12	2012–13	2013–14	2014–15	2015–16	2016–17	2017–18	2018–19	2019–20	2020–21	2021–22	2022–23
Entries and exits	343,026	375,943	375,509	373,071	384,318	380,572	373,436	365,680	356,764	374,860	374,468	363,108	354,240	350,376	335,076	301,738	298,940	61,036	287,294	320,764

The statistics cover twelve month periods that start in April.

== Services ==
All services are operated by Northern Trains.

Mondays to Saturdays, there are generally three trains per hour between Newcastle and Hexham, two of which continue to Carlisle. Some of the Newcastle services extend to Morpeth or Middlesbrough via Hartlepool. On Sundays, there are three trains per hour between Newcastle and MetroCentre, with one of the westbound services continuing to Carlisle and one of the Newcastle services continuing to Ashington.

Preceding station	National Rail	Following station
Dunston towards Newcastle	Northern Trains; Tyne Valley Line	Blaydon towards Carlisle

== Bibliography ==
- Quick, Michael (2023). Railway Passenger Stations in Great Britain: A Chronology (PDF) (5th ed.). London: Railway and Canal Historical Society.
