= Prudhoe railway station =

Railway station in Northumberland, England

Prudhoe
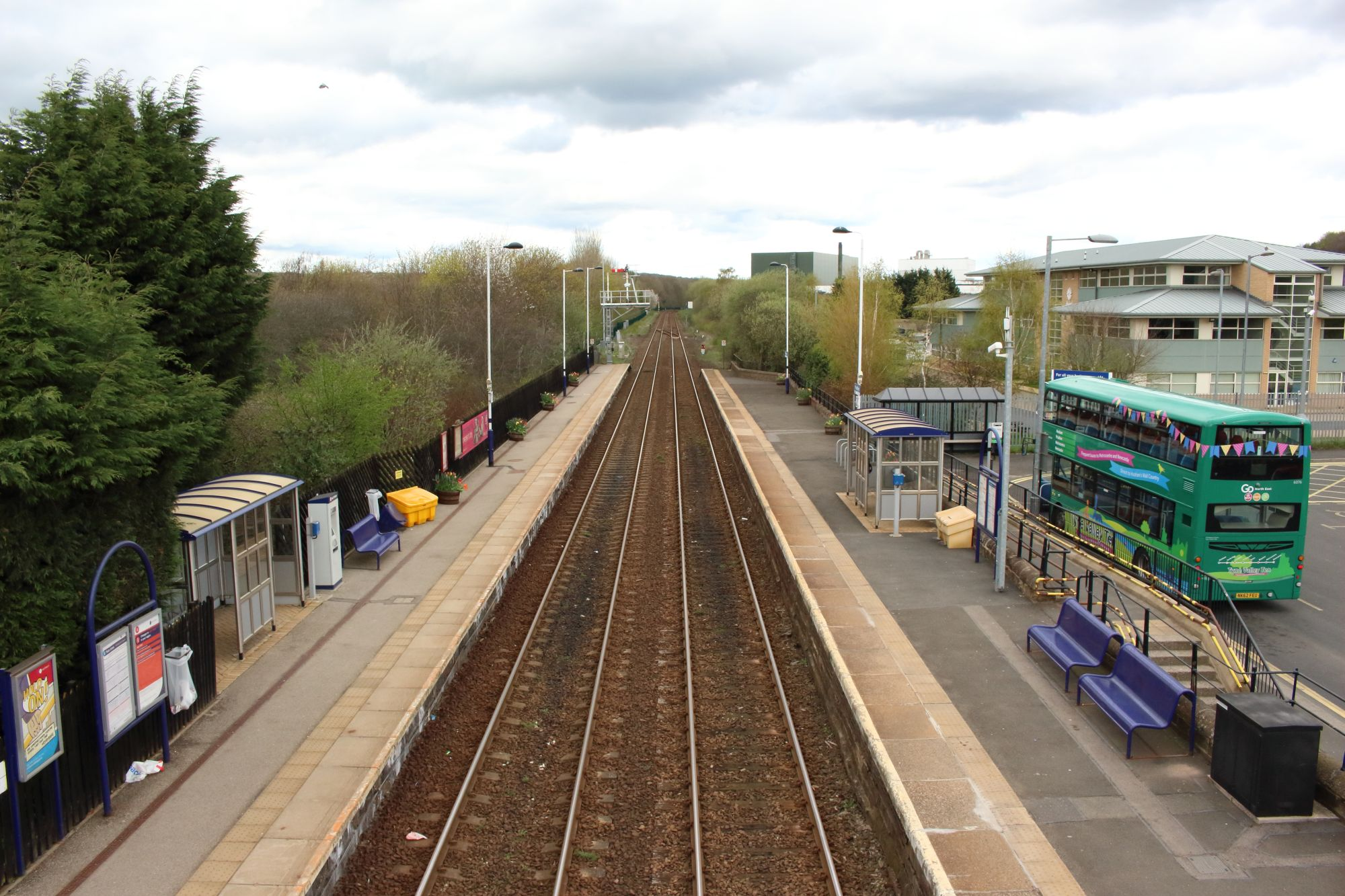

General information
- Location: Prudhoe, Northumberland; England
- Coordinates: 54°57′57″N 1°51′53″W
- Grid reference: NZ087634
- Owner: Network Rail
- Manager: Northern Trains
- Platforms: 2
- Tracks: 2

Other information
- Station code: PRU
- Classification: DfT category F2

History
- Original company: Newcastle and Carlisle Railway
- Pre-grouping: North Eastern Railway
- Post-grouping: London and North Eastern Railway; British Rail (North Eastern Region)

Key dates
- 9 March 1835: Opened as Prudhoe
- 1936/1937: Renamed Prudhoe for Ovingham
- 6 May 1974: Renamed Prudhoe

Passengers
- 2020/21: ▼32,754
- 2021/22: ▲0.114 million
- 2022/23: ▲0.134 million
- 2023/24: ▲0.175 million
- 2024/25: ▲0.184 million
Location
- Location within Northumberland
Notes
- Passenger statistics from the Office of Rail and Road

Prudhoe is a railway station on the Tyne Valley Line, which runs between Newcastle and Carlisle via Hexham. The station, situated 12 miles 1 chain (12.0 mi; 19.3 km) west of Newcastle, serves the town of Prudhoe and villages of Mickley and Ovingham in Northumberland, England. It is owned by Network Rail and managed by Northern Trains.

== History ==
The Newcastle and Carlisle Railway was formed in 1829, and was opened in stages. The station opened in March 1835, following the commencement of passenger trains between Blaydon and Hexham. It was never a junction, although extensive industrial connections on either side of the station once existed.

Between 1859 and 1915, there was another station less than 1 mile (1.6 km) west of Prudhoe, at Mickley.

The station buildings on the eastbound platform were constructed by the North Eastern Railway in 1884, having been designed in the twin pavilion style. The station ceased handling goods traffic in 1965. The buildings were subsequently demolished in 1973 by British Rail, after the station became unstaffed, along with most of the other stations on the line that escaped the Beeching Axe.

Manual semaphore signalling complete with a block post at Prudhoe Signal Box, which is located beside the station and level crossing, continues to operate. The full barrier level crossing is signalman worked.

In May 2007, a new public transport interchange was opened. This provides direct connections to bus and train services, and a 27-space car park. The opening of the interchange coincided with the introduction of a much improved train service, with most passenger trains on the Tyne Valley Line being scheduled to call at Prudhoe.

In April 2019, the platforms at the station were extended ahead of the introduction of upgraded rolling stock, as part of the Great North Rail project. Further work was undertaken between June and November 2020, which saw the refurbishment and strengthening of the station's Grade II listed metal footbridge – at a cost of £290,000.

== Facilities ==
The station has two platforms, both of which have a self-service ticket machine (which accepts card or contactless payment only), seating, waiting shelter, next train audio and visual displays and an emergency help point. Platforms are linked by a pre-grouping metal footbridge, similar to those at Riding Mill and Wylam, however there is step-free access both platforms. There is a small car park and cycle storage at the station.

Prudhoe is part of the Northern Trains penalty fare network, meaning that a valid ticket or promise to pay notice is required prior to boarding the train.

== Services ==
As of the December 2025 timetable change, there are three trains per hour between Newcastle and Hexham, two of which extend to Carlisle.

During the evening and on Sunday, an hourly service operates between Newcastle and Carlisle via Hexham. Some trains continue to Middlesbrough via Hartlepool and one in the evening to Morpeth. All services are operated by Northern Trains.

Rolling stock used: Class 156 Super Sprinter and Class 158 Express Sprinter

Preceding station	National Rail	Following station
Wylam towards Newcastle	Northern Trains; Tyne Valley Line	Stocksfield towards Carlisle
	Historical railways	
Wylam	North Eastern Railway; Newcastle and Carlisle Railway	Mickley
North Wylam	North Eastern Railway; Scotswood, Newburn and Wylam Railway	Terminus
