= Heddon-on-the-Wall =

Village in Northumberland, England

Coordinates: 54.993°N 1.791°W

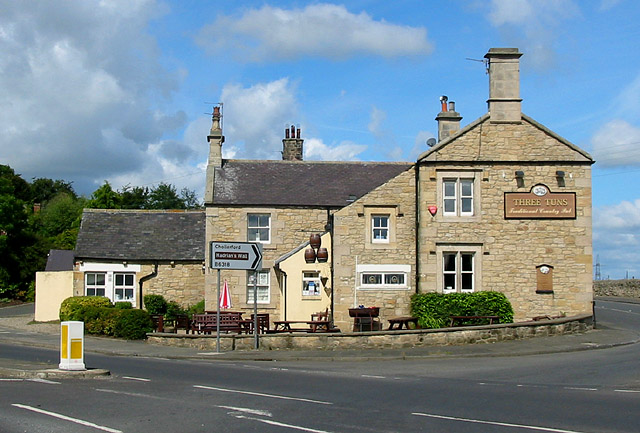
- Three Tuns public house

- Location within Northumberland
- Population: 1,563 (2011 census)
- OS grid reference: NZ135665
- Civil parish: Heddon-on-the-Wall
- Unitary authority: Northumberland
- Ceremonial county: Northumberland
- Region: North East
- Country: England
- Sovereign state: United Kingdom
- Post town: NEWCASTLE UPON TYNE
- Postcode district: NE15
- Dialling code: 01661
- Police: Northumbria
- Fire: Northumberland
- Ambulance: North East
- UK Parliament: Hexham

Heddon-on-the-Wall is a village and civil parish in Northumberland, England, located on Hadrian's Wall. Heddon-on-the-Wall is roughly 9 miles (14 km) west of the centre of Newcastle upon Tyne, and just outside Throckley. In 2011 the parish had a population of 1563. The place-name 'Heddon' means 'hill where heather grew'.

== Toponymy ==
The place-name ' Heddon on the Wall' is first attested in the Pipe Rolls for 1175, where it appears as Hedun. It appears as Heddun in 1262 and as Hedon super murum ('Heddon above the wall') in 1242. The name comes from the Old English hæth-dūn, meaning 'hill where heather grew'.

The name should not be confused with that of East Heddon and West Heddon, where the name means 'Hidda's pasture'.

== History ==
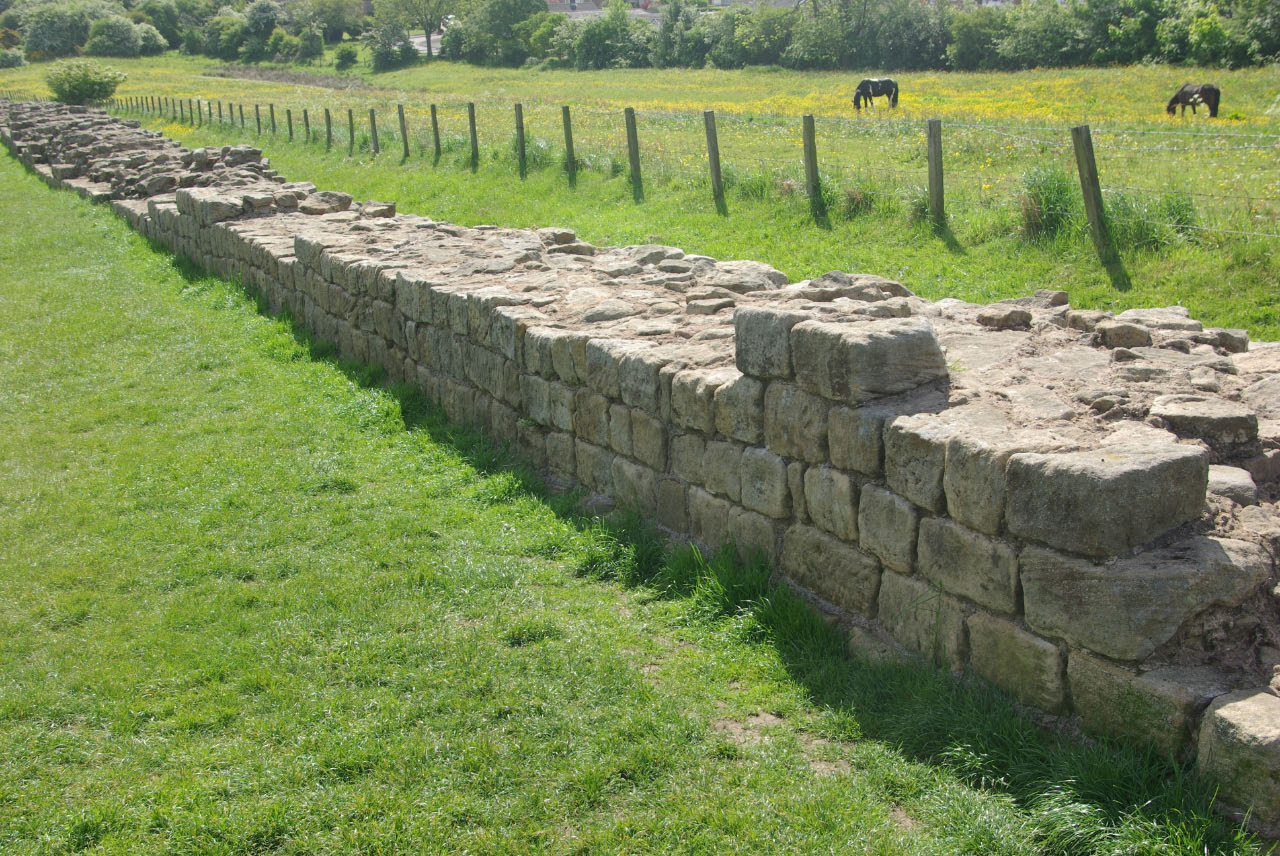
Hadrian's Wall at Heddon-on-the-Wall west of Newcastle, with the Vallum ditch running parallel in the background, behind the fence. The horses are in the Vallum ditch.

A Roman milecastle on Hadrian’s Wall ('Milecastle 12') was located at the site of the present-day village, under what is now Town Farm, but no traces of it are currently visible. Prior to the 1960s, Heddon-on-the-Wall was a small village with an economy based strongly on traditional industry including farming and coal mining.

Large-scale coal mining close to the village began in the late 1950s with the opening of the Bays Leap, a 120 hectares (300 acres) opencast mine site located a short distance north of Heddon-on-the-Wall. The site supported seven coal seams at its peak, and evidence was found of earlier mine shafts. Bays Leap closed in 1966. Urban development west of Newcastle saw the village expand substantially during the 1960s.

Heddon-on-the-Wall grew up around Hexham Road, which until 1973 was the main road from Newcastle to Hexham. The new A69 road bypasses Heddon-on-the-Wall en route from Newcastle to Carlisle, also passing Hexham. Heddon-on-the-Wall benefits from its proximity to the A69 but is more popular with retired people rather than commuters due to its lack of a railway station, from which its close neighbour Wylam benefits. A railway station on the Scotswood, Newburn & Wylam Railway was opened in the village in 1881, but closed in 1958.

Heddon-on-the-Wall came to prominence when it was revealed in February 2001 that the 2001 outbreak of Foot-and-mouth disease originated from a farm in the village. This severely affected Heddon-on-the-Wall's primary industry which is agriculture. Over the years, however, other industries have existed in Heddon-on-the-Wall. These include salmon fishing in the River Tyne, coal mining, the quarrying of sandstone and limestone, and brick making. Wylam Brewery was established at South Houghton Farm in 2000 before moving to Newcastle in 2016. A number of blacksmiths were in the village until recent times. In the 1970s there was a perfumery-manufacturing business.

== Culture and facilities ==
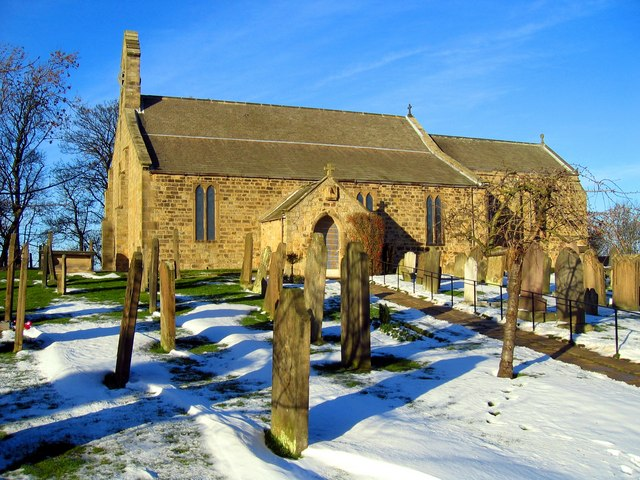
St Andrew's Church in the snow; consecrated 630AD, and built of stones from Hadrian's Wall

Heddon-on-the-Wall attracts tourists passing through on tours of Hadrian's Wall. Heddon-on-the-Wall is located on the Hadrian's Wall Path, and contains the longest section of unbroken wall at its original and planned width, now known as Broad Wall. Later sections were not built to the full width to save time and money.

St Andrew's Church is located opposite the Swan Inn and parts of it are Saxon dating back to 680AD. It was originally consecrated in 630AD. The oldest parts of St Andrew's are still visible in some of the walls of the chancel behind the choir stalls. The original stone structure was built using recycled stone from Hadrian's Wall. Before St Andrew's church was built it is suggested that the site was used for pagan ceremonies, so the hilltop location may always have been of religious significance.

Heddon-on-the-Wall has two public houses, The Three Tuns and The Swan Inn.

The site at East Heddon is the Victrix Park Sports Field, created in 2020, which is home to local club Heddon United FC. Founded on 1 June 2017, Heddon United FC's main focus is on Junior grassroots football with opportunities for players aged 4 to 18. Heddon United FC has grown rapidly to become the largest grassroots club in the Northumberland-Tynedale district. At the start of the 2020/21 season, Heddon United FC ventured into senior grassroots football with the establishment of a First Team, Reserves squad and Under 23s - the First Team currently featuring in the Northern Alliance Football League. Moving into the 2021/22 season, Heddon United incorporated a senior Ladies squad.

== Notable people from Heddon-on-the-Wall ==
- Martyn Amos (1971-) Academic and author.
- Calverley Bewicke (1755-1815) Politician.
- Sir James Knott, 1st Baronet (1855-1934) Shipping magnate and politician.
- Graham Wylie (1959-) Businessman and current owner of Close House, Northumberland.

== Freedom of the Parish ==
- Humberside and South Yorkshire Squadron Army Cadet Force: 1960.
