= Martyn Amos =

British computer scientist

- Born: 1971 (age 54–55); Hexham, Northumberland
- Education: Coventry University, University of Warwick
- Occupation: Professor in the School of Computer Science at Northumbria University

Martyn Amos is a Professor of Computational Science in the School of Computer Science at Northumbria University, working in natural computation, crowd simulation, DNA computing and synthetic biology. He was born in Hexham, Northumberland in 1971, brought up in Heddon-on-the-Wall, and attended school in Ponteland. He graduated with a degree in Computer Science from Coventry University in 1993 (which included an industrial placement working on the Ministry of Defence (United Kingdom) Corporate Headquarters Office Technology System), before earning a Ph.D. in DNA computing in 1997, from the University of Warwick. He then held a Leverhulme Trust Special Research Fellowship at the University of Liverpool, before taking up permanent academic appointments at the University of Liverpool (2000–2002), the University of Exeter (2002–2006), and Manchester Metropolitan University (2006–2018). He is a Fellow of the British Computer Society (FBCS), and an active contributor to the Futures for All education charity.

== Bibliography ==
- Martyn Amos, (Ed.) (2004). Cellular Computing. Series in Systems Biology. Oxford University Press (USA). ISBN 978-0-19-515539-6.
- Martyn Amos (2005). Theoretical and Experimental DNA Computation. Natural Computing Series. Springer. ISBN 978-3-540-65773-6. — The first general text to cover the whole field.
- Martyn Amos (2006). Genesis Machines - The New Science of Biocomputing. Atlantic Books. ISBN 978-1-84354-224-7. — A popular science style introduction to the topic.
- Martyn Amos and Ra Page (Eds.) (2014). Beta-Life: Stories from an A-Life Future. Comma Press. ISBN 978-1-90558-365-2. — A collection of "science into fiction" short stories, based on the themes of "unconventional computing" and artificial life, with accompanying afterwords written by consultant scientists.
- Susan Stepney, Steen Rasmussen, and Martyn Amos (Eds.) (2018). Computational Matter. Natural Computing Series. Springer. doi:10.1007/978-3-319-65826-1. ISBN 978-3-319-65824-7. S2CID 51705938.
