= Wylam railway station =

Railway station in Northumberland, England

Wylam
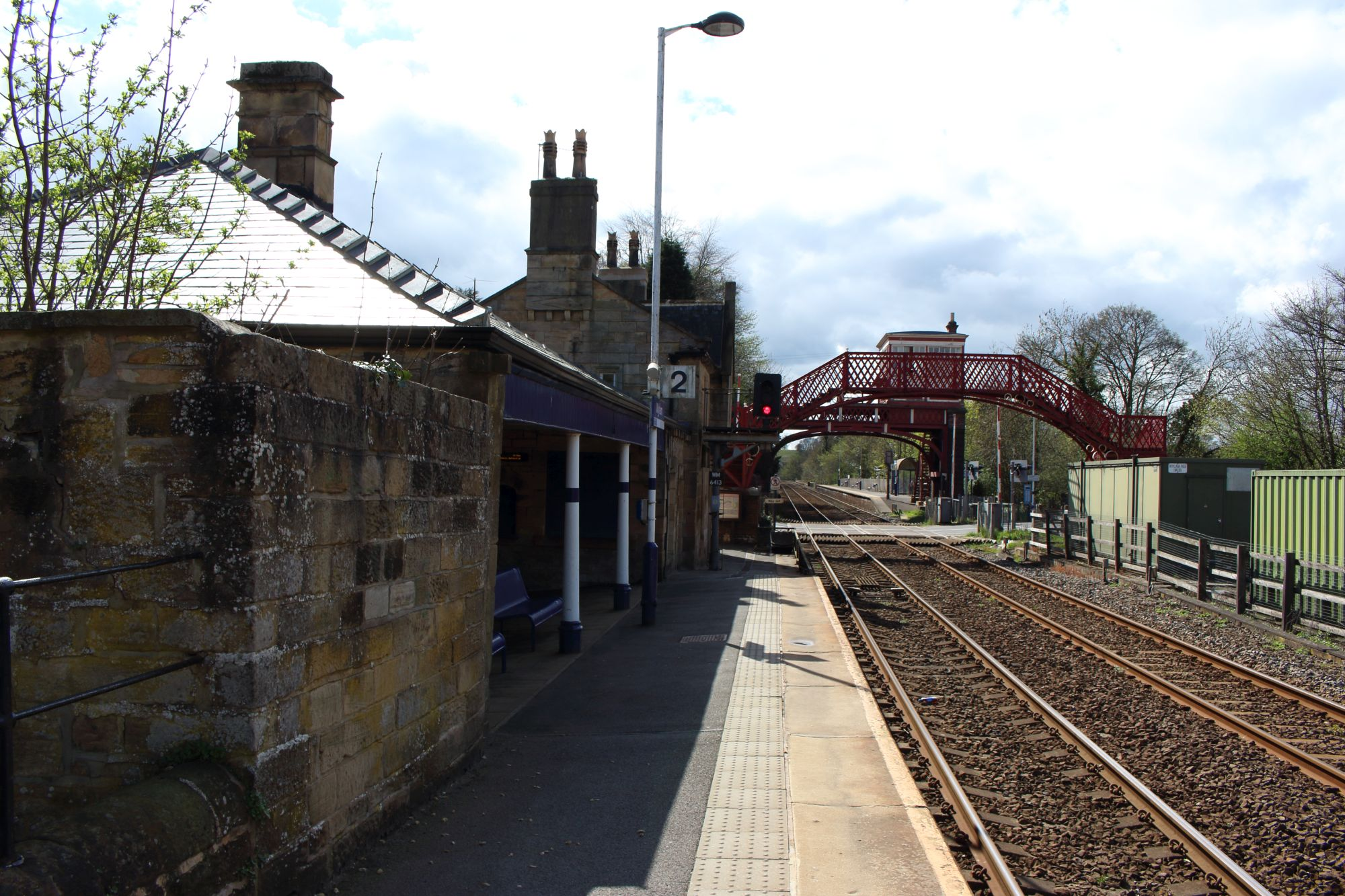

General information
- Location: Wylam, Northumberland; England
- Coordinates: 54°58′29″N 1°48′53″W
- Grid reference: NZ120644
- Owner: Network Rail
- Manager: Northern Trains
- Platforms: 2
- Tracks: 2

Other information
- Station code: WYM
- Classification: DfT category F1

History
- Original company: Newcastle and Carlisle Railway
- Pre-grouping: North Eastern Railway
- Post-grouping: London and North Eastern Railway; British Rail (North Eastern Region)

Key dates
- 9 March 1835: Opened
- 3 September 1966: Closed
- 1 May 1967: Reopened

Passengers
- 2020/21: ▼22,616
- 2021/22: ▲75,666
- 2022/23: ▲84,864
- 2023/24: ▲99,774
- 2024/25: ▲0.111 million

Listed Building – Grade II*
- Feature: Station buildings and Stationmaster's House
- Designated: 17 February 1972
- Reference no.: 1370462
Location
- Location within Northumberland
Notes
- Passenger statistics from the Office of Rail and Road

Wylam is a railway station on the Tyne Valley Line, which runs between Newcastle and Carlisle via Hexham. The station, situated 9 miles 71 chains (9.89 mi; 15.9 km) west of Newcastle, serves the village of Wylam in Northumberland, England. It is owned by Network Rail and managed by Northern Trains.

== History ==
The Newcastle and Carlisle Railway was formed in 1829, and was opened in stages. The station opened in March 1835, following the commencement of passenger trains between Blaydon and Hexham.

The station was formerly one of two serving the village, the other being North Wylam on the Scotswood, Newburn and Wylam Railway, which operated between 1876 and 1968. It was situated a short distance from the station at Wylam, at the opposite end of Wylam Bridge.

The station layout is unusual, in that the platforms are not opposite each other. The westbound platform is to the east of the level crossing, alongside the stationmaster's house, whilst the eastbound platform is to the west of the level crossing.

The over-line, elevated signal box, once a popular design for the line is now almost unique, with the only other surviving signal box of this design located at Hexham. Constructed in 1835, the stationmaster's house is a Grade II* listed building, whilst the footbridge and signal box are both Grade II listed.

== Facilities ==
The station has two platforms, both of which have a ticket machine (which accepts card or contactless payment only), seating, waiting shelter, next train audio and visual displays and an emergency help point. There is step-free access to both platforms, which are linked by level crossing and footbridge. There is a small pay and display car park and cycle storage at the station.

Wylam is part of the Northern Trains penalty fare network, meaning that a valid ticket or promise to pay notice is required prior to boarding the train.

== Services ==
As of the December 2025 timetable change, there is an hourly service between Newcastle and Hexham (or Carlisle on Sunday), with additional calls at peak times. All services are operated by Northern Trains.

Rolling stock used: Class 156 Super Sprinter and Class 158 Express Sprinter

Preceding station	National Rail	Following station
Blaydon towards Newcastle	Northern Trains; Tyne Valley Line	Prudhoe towards Carlisle
	Historical railways	
Ryton	North Eastern Railway; Newcastle and Carlisle Railway	Prudhoe
