= Dunston railway station =

Railway station in Tyne and Wear, England

Dunston
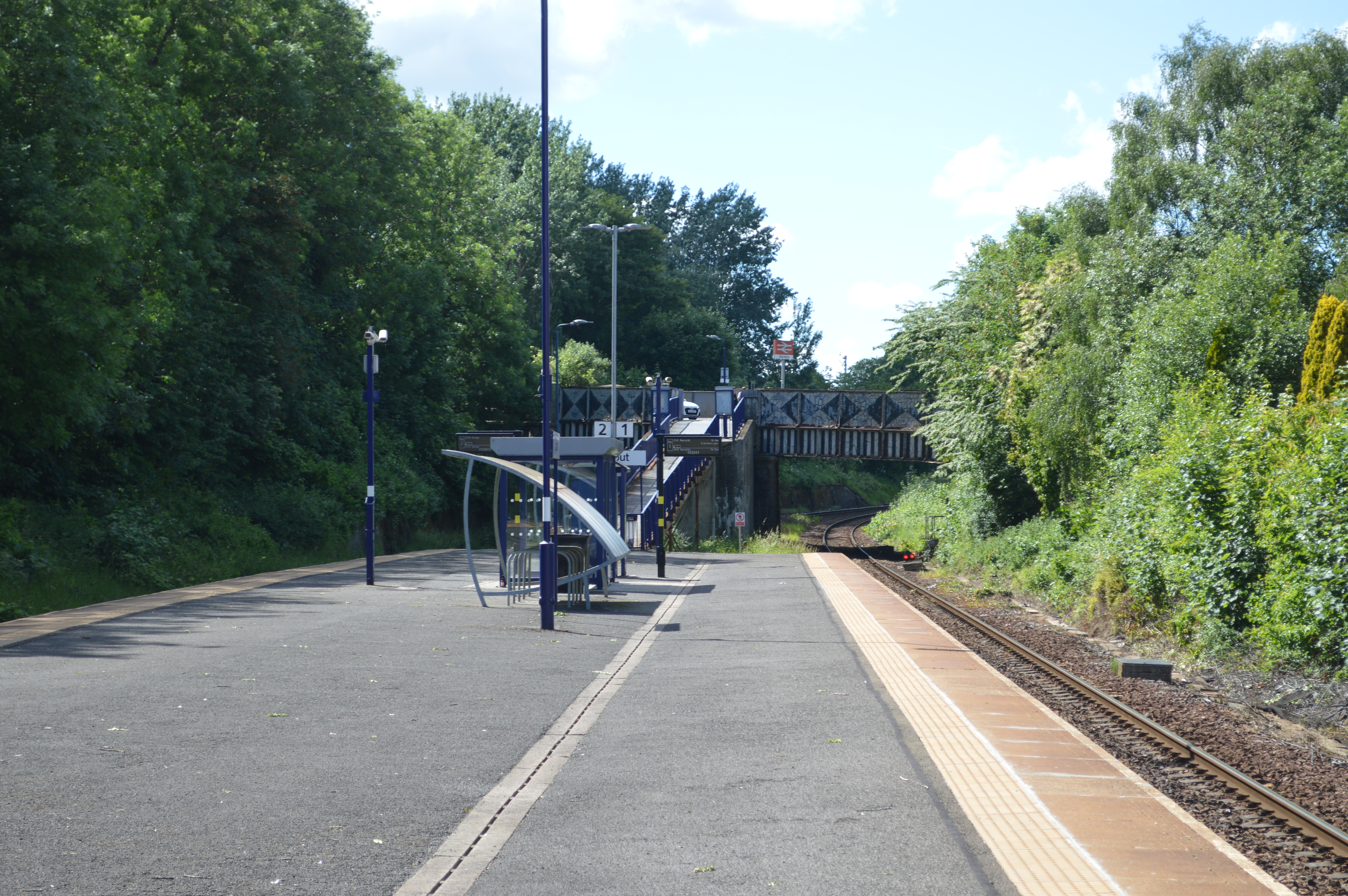

General information
- Location: Dunston, Gateshead; England
- Coordinates: 54°57′00″N 1°38′29″W
- Grid reference: NZ230617
- Owner: Network Rail
- Manager: Northern Trains
- Transit authority: Tyne and Wear PTE
- Platforms: 2
- Tracks: 2

Other information
- Station code: DOT
- Classification: DfT category F2

History
- Original company: North Eastern Railway
- Pre-grouping: North Eastern Railway
- Post-grouping: London and North Eastern Railway; British Rail (Eastern Region)

Key dates
- 1 January 1909: Opened as Dunston-on-Tyne
- 1 May 1918: Closed
- 1 October 1919: Reopened
- 4 May 1926: Closed
- 1 October 1984: Reopened as Dunston

Passengers
- 2021/22: ▲17,938
- 2022/23: ▲24,538
- 2023/24: ▲46,762
- 2024/25: ▲50,828
- 2025/26: ▲60,304
Location
- Location within Tyne and Wear
Notes
- Passenger statistics from the Office of Rail and Road

Dunston is a railway station on the Tyne Valley Line, which runs between Newcastle and Carlisle via Hexham. The station, situated 2 miles 23 chains (2.29 mi; 3.68 km) west of Newcastle, serves the suburb of Dunston, Gateshead in Tyne and Wear, England. It is owned by Network Rail and managed by Northern Trains.

== History ==
The station opened in January 1909, on a section of line built by the North Eastern Railway between 1893 and 1909. It linked the lines over the newly commissioned King Edward VII Bridge with the original Newcastle and Carlisle Railway freight route to Redheugh and Dunston Coal Staiths, dating back to 1837.

The station was originally known as Dunston-on-Tyne, and served as the terminus of a shuttle service from Newcastle. As a result of the General Strike of 1926, the service ended and the station was closed in May 1926, briefly being brought back into use for special evacuation trains during World War II.

Following the closure of Scotswood Bridge in October 1982, trains were re-routed across the King Edward VII Bridge and through Dunston. The station was re-opened as Dunston by British Rail in October 1984. Initially, most services on the Tyne Valley Line called at the station. However, services were later reduced due to low passenger numbers, particularly following the opening of MetroCentre in August 1987. The timetable has though been improved by the current operator (since 2013) and is now comparable to many other stations on the line.

== Facilities ==
The station has a single island platform, which has a ticket machine (which accepts card or contactless payment only), seating, waiting shelter, next train audio display and an emergency help point. There is step-free access to the platform, which is accessed by ramp. There is cycle storage at the station.

Dunston is part of the Northern Trains penalty fare network, meaning that a valid ticket or promise to pay notice is required prior to boarding the train.

== Services ==
On Mondays to Saturdays there is an hourly service between Newcastle and Hexham, with additional trains at peak times. On Sundays there is an hourly service between Newcastle and MetroCentre.

All services are operated by Northern Trains.

Rolling stock used: Class 156 Super Sprinter and Class 158 Express Sprinter

| Preceding station | National Rail | Following station |
|---|---|---|
| Newcastle towards Newcastle | Northern Trains; Tyne Valley Line | MetroCentre towards Carlisle |
