= North Wylam railway station =

Disused railway station in Wylam, Northumberland

North Wylam
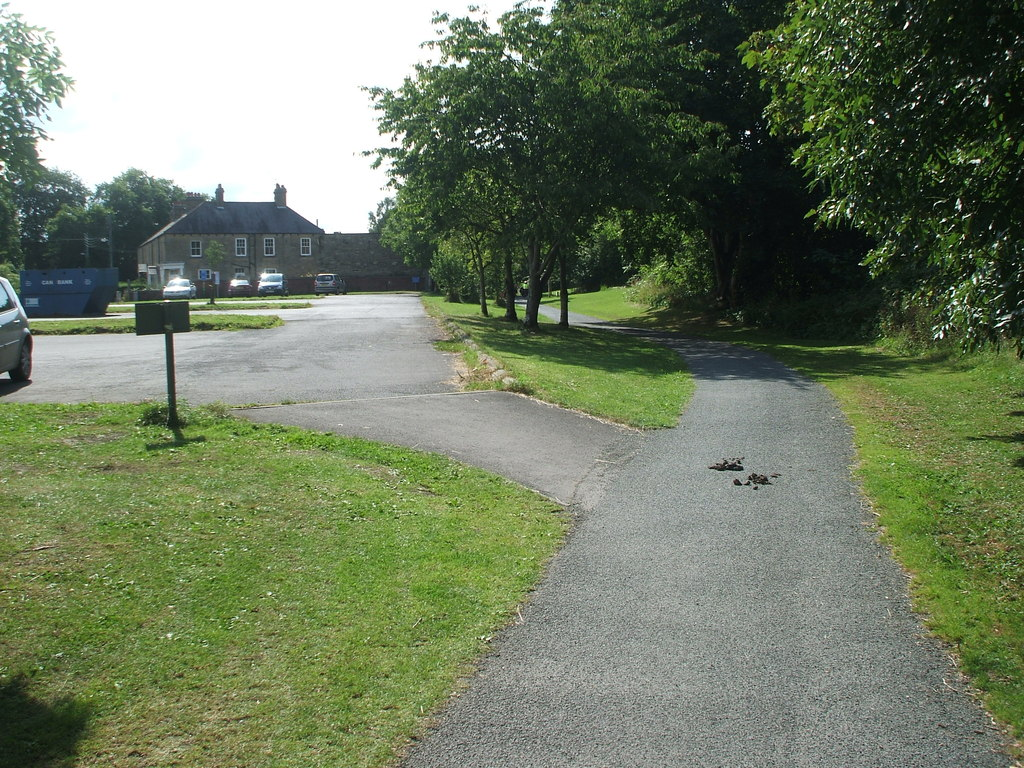
- The site of the station in 2009

General information
- Location: Wylam, Northumberland; England
- Coordinates: 54.9764°N 1.8171°W
- Grid reference: NZ118646
- Platforms: 2

Other information
- Status: Disused

History
- Original company: Scotswood, Newburn and Wylam Railway
- Pre-grouping: North Eastern Railway (United Kingdom)
- Post-grouping: London and North Eastern Railway; British Rail (Eastern)

Key dates
- 13 May 1876: Opened
- 1 January 1961: closed for goods
- 11 March 1968: Closed for passengers
Location

North Wylam railway station served the village of Wylam, Northumberland, England from 1876 to 1968 on the Tyne Valley Line.

== History ==
The station opened on 13 May 1876 by the Scotswood, Newburn and Wylam Railway. The station was situated between Falcon Terrace and Main Road, north of the road bridge over the River Tyne. It is a 5-minute walk from Wylam station. The goods facilities were south of the station building which closed on 1 January 1961. Despite heavy passenger traffic, the station closed on 11 March 1968.

Preceding station	Disused railways	Following station
Heddon on the Wall; Line and station closed	Scotswood, Newburn and Wylam Railway; Tyne Valley Line	Prudhoe; Line closed, station open
