= Lemington railway station =

Disused railway station in Newcastle-upon-Tyne, England

Lemington

General information
- Location: Lemington, Newcastle upon Tyne; England
- Coordinates: 54.9754°N 1.7087°W
- Grid reference: NZ187645
- Platforms: 2

Other information
- Status: Disused

History
- Original company: Scotswood, Newburn and Wylam Railway
- Pre-grouping: North Eastern Railway (United Kingdom)
- Post-grouping: London and North Eastern Railway; British Rail (North Eastern)

Key dates
- 12 July 1875: Opened
- 15 September 1958: Closed to passengers
- 7 July 1964: Closed completely
Location

Lemington railway station served the district of Lemington, Newcastle-upon-Tyne, England, from 1875 to 1964 on the Tyne Valley Line.

== History ==
The station opened on 12 July 1875 by the Scotswood, Newburn and Wylam Railway. The station was adjacent to the junction of Tyne View and Sugley Villas. The sidings served Montagu and Blucher Collieries, Carr's brickyard and a copperas works. The station closed to passengers on 15 September 1958 and closed to goods on 4 January 1960, although it reopened as a coal depot on 17 June 1963. It closed completely on 7 July 1964.

Preceding station	Disused railways	Following station
Scotswood; Line and station closed	Scotswood, Newburn and Wylam Railway; Tyne Valley Line	Newburn; Line and station closed
