= Newburn railway station =

Former railway station in England

Newburn
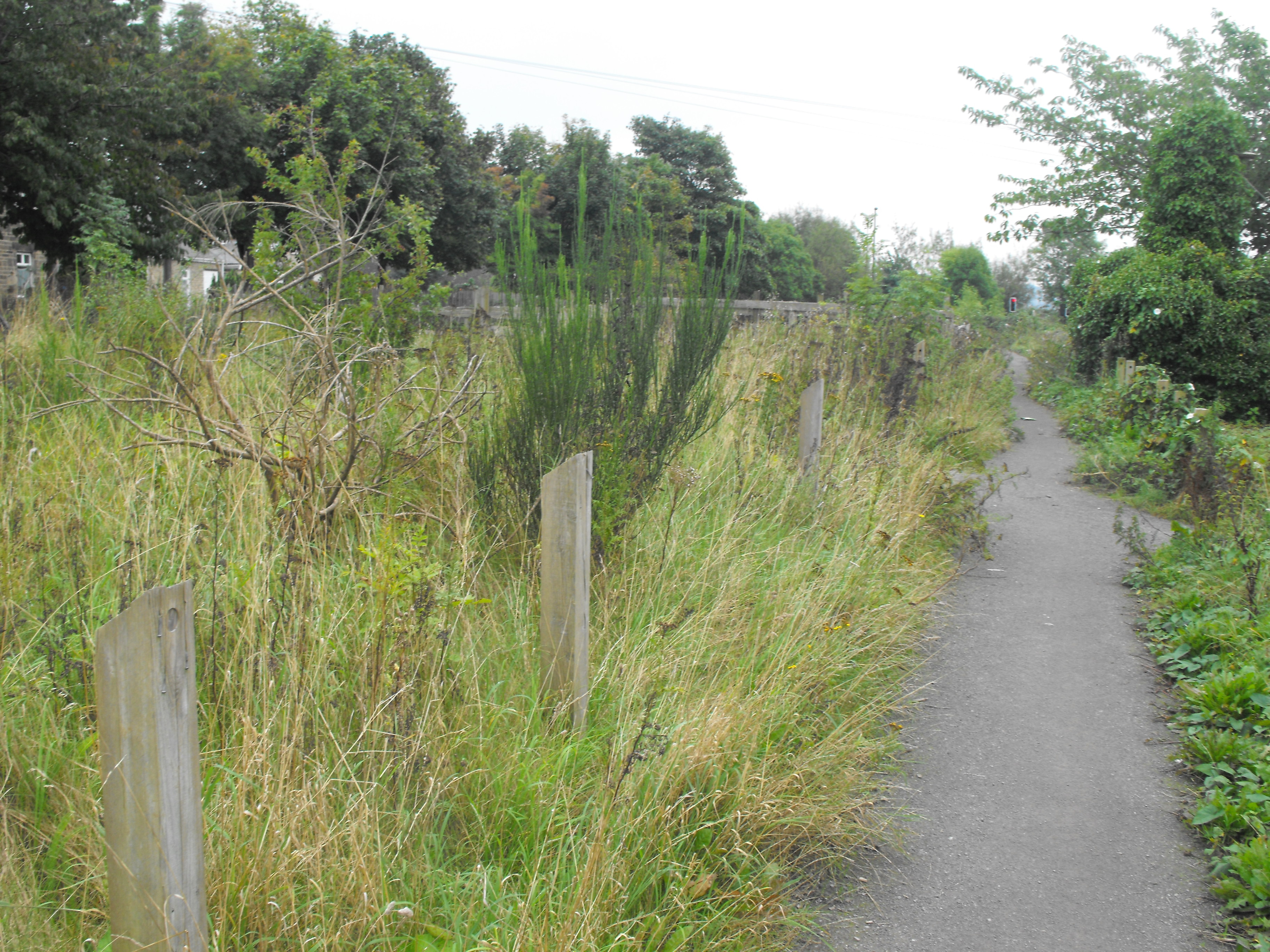
- The site of Newburn station in 2008

General information
- Location: Newburn, Newcastle upon Tyne; England
- Coordinates: 54.981°N 1.744°W
- Grid reference: NZ165652
- Platforms: 2

Other information
- Status: Disused

History
- Original company: Scotswood, Newburn & Wylam Railway & Dock Company
- Pre-grouping: North Eastern Railway
- Post-grouping: London and North Eastern Railway; British Rail North Eastern Region

Key dates
- 1875: opened
- 1958: Station closed to passengers
- 1965: Station closed to goods traffic
Location

Newburn station was a railway station serving the village of Newburn, Newcastle upon Tyne. The station was situated at the bottom of Station Road, near Newburn Bridge, and was on the Scotswood, Newburn and Wylam Railway, a branch line of the Newcastle and Carlisle Railway.

== History ==
The station was opened on 12 July 1875. The station ceased to receive passenger trains on 15 September 1958 and was then closed to goods trains on 26 April 1965. The station was then largely demolished, but the tracks were kept intact until the early 1990s, for coal traffic to be delivered to Stella North power station. The platforms and trackbed have now all been removed and made into part of a footpath.

| Preceding station | Historical railways | Following station |
|---|---|---|
| Lemington; Line and station closed | Scotswood, Newburn and Wylam Railway; Tyne Valley Line | Heddon on the Wall; Line and station closed |
