= Metrocentre =

Shopping centre in Gateshead, Tyne & Wear

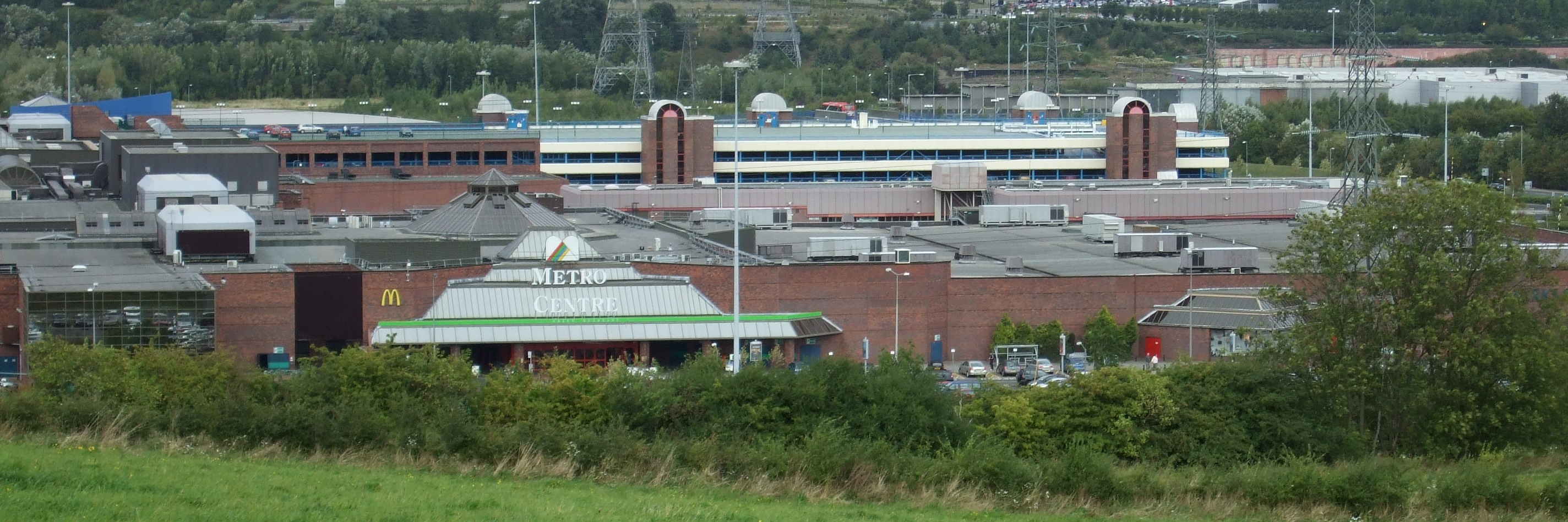
- The Green Quadrant of Metrocentre
- Location: Gateshead, Tyne and Wear, England
- Coordinates: 54.9569°N 1.6689°W
- Opened: 14 October 1986; 40 years ago
- Previous names: intu Metrocentre (2013-2020)
- Developer: Cameron Hall Developments
- Owner: Landsec
- Num. of stores: 282 (as of November 2026) +15 In the Metro Retail Park
- Num. of anchor tenants: 8: Marks & Spencer; Primark; Flannels, Sports Direct, Everlast Gyms (one unit); TK Maxx / Homesense; Odeon, Namco Funscape Metro; NEXT; JD Sports; H Beauty
- Floor area: 2,076,000 sq ft (192,900 m^{2})
- Floors: 2 Floors, The Yellow Multi-Storey & Blue Multi-Storey are 5 Floors and the Red Multi Storey is 6 Floors.
- Parking: almost 10,000 spaces
- Public transit: Metrocentre Interchange; MetroCentre
- Website: themetrocentre.co.uk

Metrocentre (previously styled as MetroCentre) is a shopping centre and entertainment complex in the Dunston area of Gateshead. It is located on the former site of Dunston Power Station, near to the River Tyne.

Metrocentre opened in stages, with the first phase opening on 28 April 1986, and the official opening being held on 14 October that year. It has 210 shops, 63 restaurants, an Odeon cinema, a Clip n’ Climb, a bowling alley, a Namco Funscape, The Escapologist and Treetop Golf, occupying over 2,000,000 sq ft (190,000 m^{2}) of retail floor space, making it one of the largest shopping centres in the UK. Additional retail space can be found in the adjoining Metro Retail Park and MetrOasis.

== History ==
The logo used from 2004 to 2009; the stylised "M" is based on the previous grey-coloured symbol used from 1987

Metrocentre's construction was financed by the Church Commissioners of England, and was masterminded by Sir John Hall's company, Cameron Hall Developments. The ground upon which it is built was purchased for £100,000 in the early 1970s. Access to the development was facilitated by an urban development grant from the Department of the Environment, and the Metropolitan Borough of Gateshead.

In early 1984, the Metropolitan Borough of Gateshead helped to host an exhibition at a local hotel to draw attention to the proposed scheme. To the surprise of all involved, over 1,000 visitors, including the top retailers in the UK, Marks & Spencer, Burton, Boots, Sears, BHS, House of Fraser and Littlewoods came to the North East to view the exhibition and express their interest in the development. Suddenly, the Metrocentre became “flavour of the month” in retailing.

The first phase of the development, the Red Mall, was opened in April 1986. At the time, it featured a large Carrefour supermarket, which later became a Gateway, and subsequently Asda. Metrocentre also featured the first out-of-town branch of Marks & Spencer. The Green Mall was opened by Nicholas Ridley, Secretary of State for the Environment, as part of Phase 2 on 14 October 1986, with the Blue and Yellow Malls following in Phase 3 in 1987. A UCI cinema also opened in Phase 3.

In August 1987 the MetroCentre railway station, which is connected to the centre via a covered footbridge, was opened by British Rail.

1988 saw Metroland and the Yellow Mall open to the public. A Roman Forum-themed area also opened, and by 1989, a Mediterranean Village-themed area, a GX Superbowl bowling alley, a 350 bay Coach Park and the entire mall opened.

=== 1990s–2000s ===
By 1990, Phase 4 and the A1 Western Bypass opened, and by 1991, the Western Bypass 3rd lane opened inbound from the A1 South. With 1992 rolling in, the north perimeter link to A1 North and West opened, and in 1994, a new road called Handy Drive opened.

In October 1995, the centre was sold to Transatlantic Insurance (later Intu Properties) for £364 million, although the Church Commissioners retained a 10% stake.

In 1997, Asda moved from Metrocentre to a larger stand-alone store nearby, facilitating the redevelopment of the Red Mall, with the former Asda store being demolished in 2002, with the new Debenhams department store open by October 2004. The refurbishment programme at the time also included the construction of a new Transport Interchange, sited at the edge of the Blue Mall, replacing the former bus station.

In November 2006, centre owner Capital Shopping Centres announced plans to redevelop the centre's Yellow Mall. The Metroland indoor funfair closed in April 2008, and the area, along with the neighbouring Clockworks Food Court, has since been refurbished to become Metrocentre Qube.

Until August 2007, when it was purchased for £82.5 million, the adjacent retail park was not under the same ownership as the shopping centre.

In 2008, plans were announced for the £35 million redevelopment to the Yellow Mall into a new dining and leisure area. With this, The New Metroland and Megabowl were closed for the accommodation for the new scheme, and by May 2009, the Qube opened, with restaurants like Nando’s, Frankie & Benny’s, Yo! Sushi, The Red House and PizzaExpress. With that, the first three specially commissioned art projects were installed in the Upper Qube. The first one to be installed was “This and That” by Colin Rose. It is an impressive sculpture made up of two giant steel cones.

The second art project was installed in the Lower Qube. The small piece, named “Outside In” by local artist Stephen Newby is made up of four blown stainless steel cubes. In November 2009, a Namco Funscape amusement centre opened in the Lower Qube, with 18 ten-pin bowling lanes, the fastest Dodgem Track in Europe, a children’s soft play area and more. With that, it caused Odeon to move from the Lower Blue Mall to the Upper Qube in December 2009.

=== 2010s–2020s ===
Autumn 2010 saw a mixed TK Maxx and Homesense store open on the site of the former cinema in the Lower Blue Mall. In November 2011, construction started on the new MetrOasis, on the site of a former Esso garage. In 2012, the Central Mall was redeveloped as the Platinum Mall, which focuses on higher-end stores and designer outlets. Initial stores in the Platinum Mall included Mamas & Papas, H&M Kids and Tessuti.

The centre was rebranded as intu Metrocentre in 2013, following the renaming of its parent Capital Shopping Centres Group as Intu Properties. With that, the old federation brewery site was demolished in 2013.

In March 2018, a 78,000 sq ft Next store opened, taking twelve shops on the upper floor, and the former BHS unit on the lower level, to create one of the largest Next stores in the country. Next further expanded their presence in the centre in 2020 by opening a Beauty & Home store in the former Debenhams anchor unit.

On 26 October 2020, it was announced that Sovereign Centros was to oversee asset management of the centre on behalf of owners Metrocentre Partnership, following the collapse of Intu. The shopping centre was again rebranded, as The Metrocentre, with Savills as on-site property managers. Owners, the Metrocentre Partnership includes Church Commissioners and GIC Real Estate.

On 1 October 2026, the centre was sold to Landsec in a £516 million deal.

== Malls and retailers ==
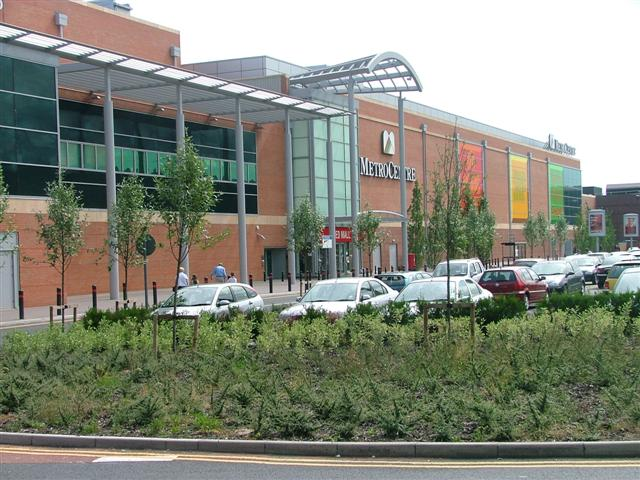
The Red Mall extension

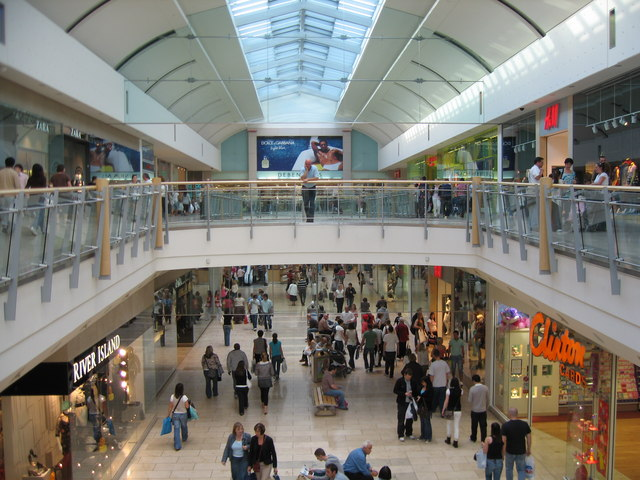
Interior of Red Mall extension in 2007

Metrocentre has five malls: Red, Green, Blue, Yellow and Platinum.

Many large retail chains are represented in the centre. It is anchored by a number of large stores and department stores:

- Marks & Spencer (Green Mall)
- Next (Green Mall)
- H Beauty (Town Square) (Formerly House of Fraser)
- Primark (Exhibition Square)
- TK Maxx (Blue Mall)
- Sports Direct (Red Mall) (Formerly Debenhams)
- JD Sports

Major fashion retailers include: All Saints, H&M, New Look, Next, Primark, River Island and Zara.

Other major retailers include: Boots, Hotel Chocolat, Poundland, TGJones, Ann Summers, Lush, Waterstones, Lego, and Apple.

== Leisure facilities ==
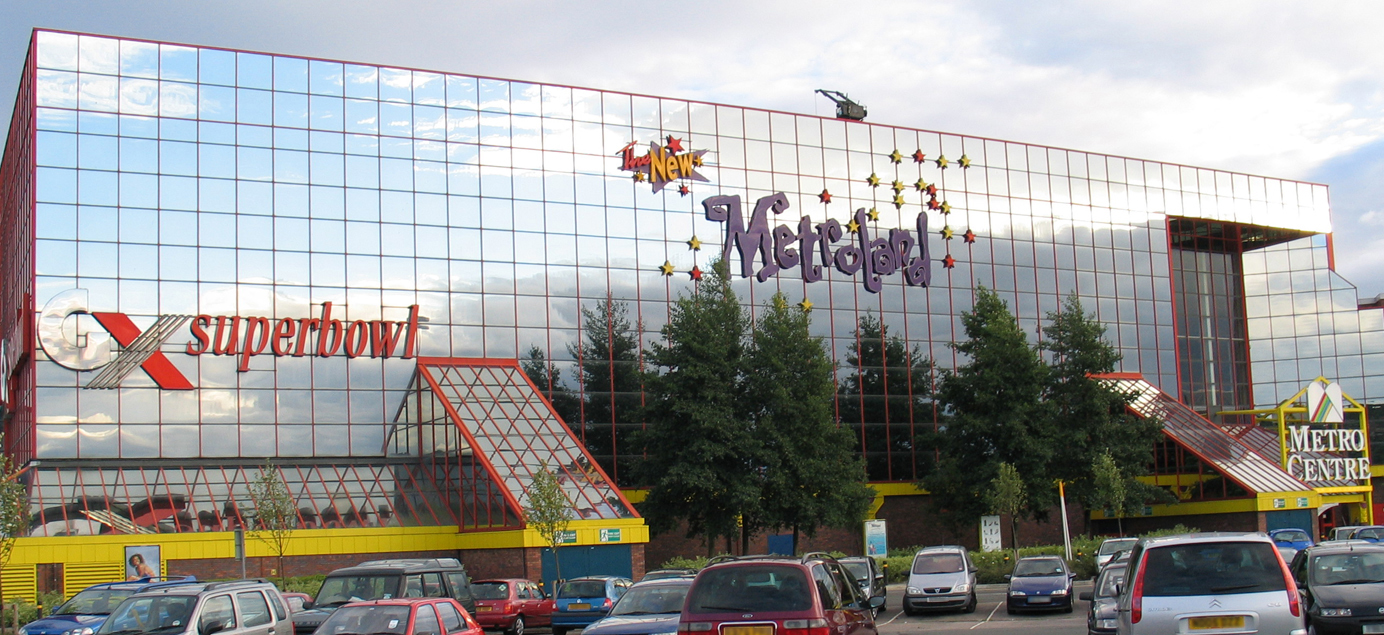
The New Metroland, previously Europe's largest indoor amusement park

The centre's leisure facilities, which are mainly located in the Qube / Yellow Mall, consist of an Odeon cinema and Namco Funscape, Clip & Climb, Treetop Golf and Escapologist Escape Rooms.

The Odeon, a 12 screen cinema, opened in 2010. It features a VIP lounge, as well as multiple 3D screens, and an IMAX Digital – the first in the north-east of England.

Namco Funscape is located on the lower floor, and is a family entertainment centre including an 18-lane ten-pin bowling alley, dodgem ride and soft play.

Treetop Golf, which opened in upper Qube in late 2023, features two 18 hole mini golf courses. Clip & Climb in lower Qube is home to 26 climbing walls and a 10m drop slide. It replaced the old Angry Birds Adventure Golf space when it closed on 19 February 2023.

In November 2023 Everlast Gyms opened the UK's largest hybrid gym on what was the top floor of the former Debenhams department store. The 40,000 sq ft gym includes a full size boxing ring, spin studio, yoga room, saunas and ice baths.

The Qube's exterior is clad with zinc and glass, to distinguish it as the entertainment part of the centre.

Qube is also home to a number of restaurants, including Bella Italia, Nando's, Pizza Express, YO! Sushi and Zizzi.

=== Metroland ===
The centre also featured an entirely enclosed theme park called Metroland. Renamed The New Metroland following refurbishment works by operators Arlington Leisure in 1996, it was Europe's largest indoor amusement park until its closure in 2008. Metroland opened in February 1988 at the cost of £20 million. The park's main rides included a rollercoaster, Ferris wheel, pirate ship, waltzers, a miniature railway and dodgem cars.

On the final weekend before its closure (19–20 April 2008), the park held the 'Last Ride Weekend', where the admission price was £5 for the whole day, with unlimited access to all the rides. The park finally closed at 8:00 pm on 20 April 2008, despite strong local opposition, and petitions raising around 4,000 signatures. Proceeds from the last night of operation went to charity.

After the closure, many of the park's rides were either scrapped or sold off, with the rollercoaster being relocated to The Big Sheep, a farm and theme park complex in Devon, where it reopened in March 2016. The park offered a free ride to visitors from the North-East of England for a period after the rollercoaster's reopening.

== Metro Retail Park ==
Metro Retail Park occupies over 183,000 sq ft of space and is home to 15 brands, the majority of which are home and lifestyle brands. Situated to the west of Metrocentre it has the layout of a conventional out-of-town retail park, with large stores such as Barker and Stonehouse, Oak Furniture Land and Furniture Village.

The former Toys R Us unit was demolished in November 2022 to make way for a £5m redevelopment to bring in three new units, occupying over 25,000 sq ft of space. Work also included the introduction of 6 rapid EV charging units and increased cycle bay provision.

== metrOasis ==
The metrOasis retail area, on the perimeter of the shopping centre, opened to the public in September 2012. It is located between Qube and the Metro Retail Park, on the site of a former petrol station. The development is home to a range of dining and entertainment venues, with construction beginning in January 2012. The retail area includes drive-thru Krispy Kreme Doughnuts and Starbucks, as well as a Toby Carvery and Burger King.

== Transport ==
Metrocentre has a large bus station and a railway station, which are connected to the centre via a covered footbridge. The centre's car parking facilities have approximately 10,000 spaces.

== Sources ==
- Woodhouse, Robert (1992). Gateshead. A Pictorial History. Chichester: Phillimore & Co Ltd. ISBN 0 85033 825 5.
