= Naworth level crossing accident =

Train accident in 1926

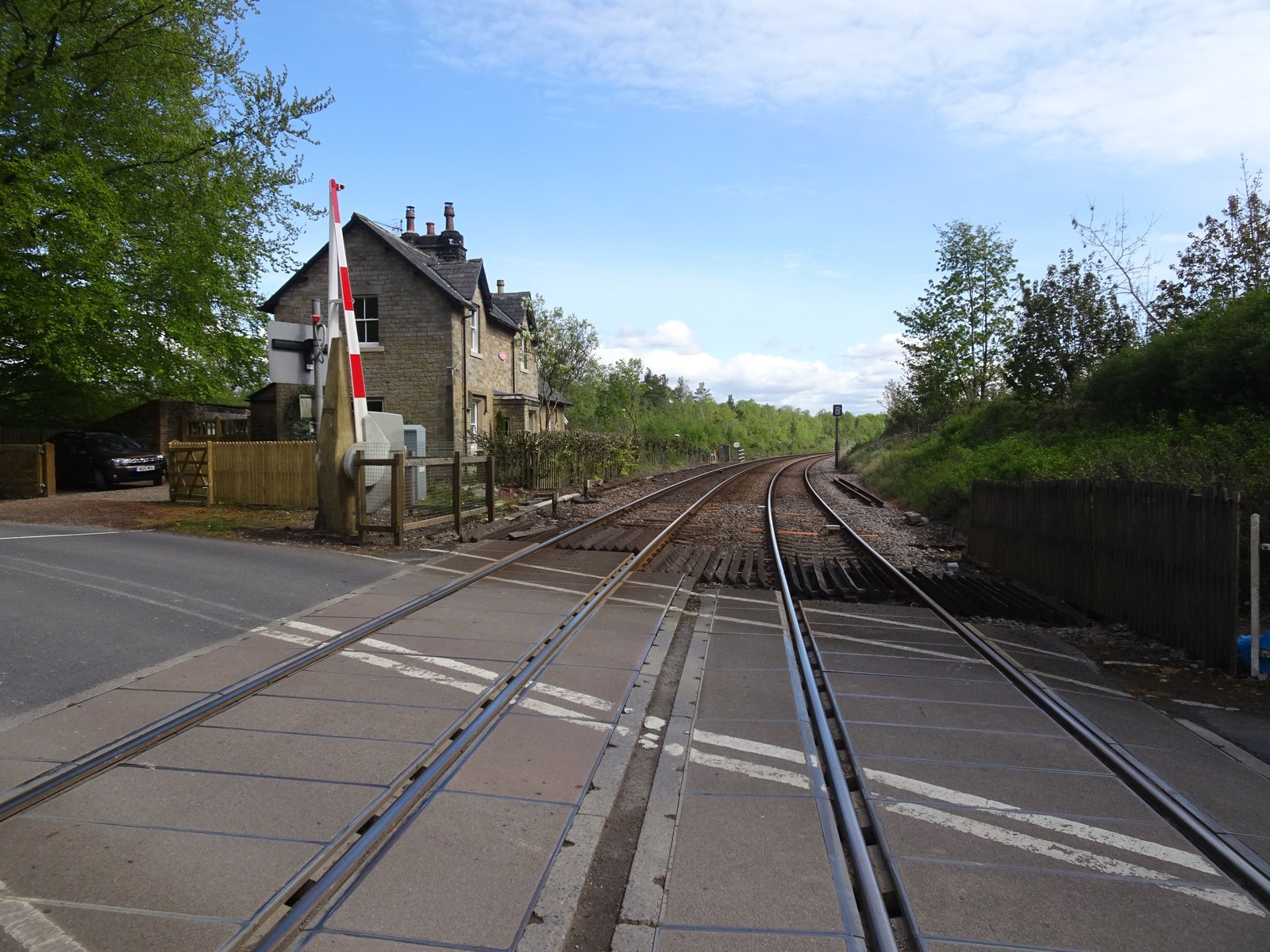
- Naworth level crossing and former station, photographed in 2019

Details
- Date: 30 August 1926; 14:38
- Location: Naworth, Cumberland
- Coordinates: 54.9480°N 2.6807°W
- Country: England
- Line: Tyne Valley Line
- Operator: London and North Eastern Railway
- Cause: Vehicle incursion (level crossing)

Statistics
- Trains: 1
- Vehicles: 1
- Deaths: 9
- Injured: 6, 3 serious

On the afternoon of 30 August 1926, a train struck a charabanc on the level crossing adjacent to Naworth railway station on the Tyne Valley Line between Newcastle upon Tyne and Carlisle. The accident killed nine people, and seriously injured three more.

== Accident ==
The accident occurred at around 2:38 PM. The motor charabanc, which was carrying 17 people, was erroneously allowed to cross the tracks just as the 1:18 PM express from Newcastle to Carlisle was passing through Naworth at approximately 45 to 50 miles per hour (72 to 80 km/h). The train struck the charabanc immediately behind the rear wheels, turning it round by an angle of 90 degrees. The body of the charabanc was completely wrecked in the collision apart from the front seat, but the remains were dragged 100 yards (91 m) by the train. The train was not derailed, and came to a stand 115 yards (105 m) beyond the level crossing. Eight people, including the porter at Naworth station were killed outright, and one other casualty died on the way to hospital; three people were seriously injured.

== Inquiry ==
The official inquiry which was produced by A. H. L. Mount in October 1926, found that the accident was entirely the responsibility of the porter W. J. Oliver, who was in charge of operating the manual level crossing (and was himself killed in the accident). An inquest into the deaths the previous month recorded a verdict of manslaughter against Oliver. He had failed to operate the level crossing in accordance with the established procedures, which involved going to the porters room to observe the block instruments, which would have told him whether a train was approaching, and then placing the signals at danger, before opening the gates to allow road traffic to cross. Mount recommended that the crossing be upgraded to bring it in line with modern practices, as Oliver was able to operate the gates to allow traffic across without checking with the signallers first.
