= Heddon-on-the-Wall railway station =

Disused railway station in Heddon-on-the-Wall, Northumberland

Heddon-on-the-Wall
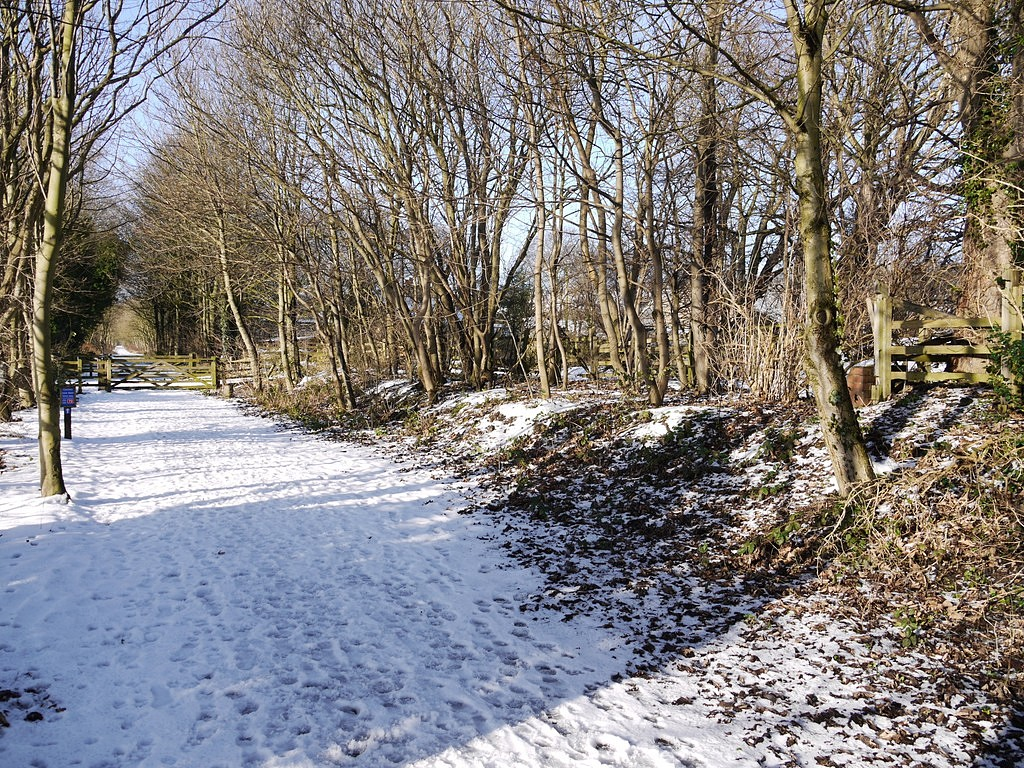
- The site of the station in 2013

General information
- Location: Heddon-on-the-Wall, Northumberland; England
- Coordinates: 54.9846°N 1.7764°W
- Grid reference: NZ144655
- Platforms: 2

Other information
- Status: Disused

History
- Original company: Scotswood, Newburn and Wylam Railway
- Pre-grouping: North Eastern Railway
- Post-grouping: British Rail (North Eastern)

Key dates
- July 1881: Opened
- 15 September 1958: Closed
Location

Heddon-on-the-Wall railway station served the village of Heddon-on-the-Wall, Northumberland, England from 1881 to 1958.

== History ==
The station opened in July 1881 by the Scotswood, Newburn and Wylam Railway. It was situated where Station Road (southeast of Heddon village) meets the National Cycle Route, which follows the railway trackbed. Lemington colliery had to be moved north to accommodate the up platform. Nearby were Heddon Colliery and firebrick works, Bank Farm and Sir John Jackson sidings. In 1911, 14,124 tickets were sold but this dropped to 2,428 in 1951. The station closed to both passengers and goods traffic on 15 September 1958.

Preceding station	Disused railways	Following station
Newburn; Line and station closed	Scotswood, Newburn and Wylam Railway; Tyne Valley Line	North Wylam; Line and station closed
