= Elswick railway station =

Closed railway station in Tyne and Wear, England

Elswick

General information
- Location: Newcastle upon Tyne, Newcastle upon Tyne; England
- Coordinates: 54.9645°N 1.6574°W
- Grid reference: NZ217634
- Platforms: 2

Other information
- Status: Disused

History
- Original company: North Eastern Railway
- Pre-grouping: North Eastern Railway
- Post-grouping: London and North Eastern Railway

Key dates
- 2 September 1889: Opened
- 2 January 1967: Closed
Location

Elswick railway station was a railway station in the Elswick area of Newcastle upon Tyne, England. It was located on the former route of the Newcastle and Carlisle Railway from Newcastle upon Tyne to Carlisle. The station opened in 1889 and closed in 1967.

== History ==
J and W Simpson of North Shields began construction in 1888. The station opened on 2 September 1889 and was located on the south side of Scotswood Road, about 100 yards east of the junction with William Armstrong Drive. It was built at the western end of Armstrong's huge Elswick Works site, its workforce (exceeding 11,000 by 1900) providing a significant proportion of the station's traffic. By 1889 the operating company was the North Eastern Railway which had absorbed the Newcastle and Carlisle in July 1862. The North Eastern Railway from about 1875 until the early-20th century built a number of stations with island platforms and/or over-track station buildings, and Elswick had both features. Its 25 ft-wide island platform had a lengthy glazed awning supported by iron columns and spandrels with the Star of David motif – as at Heaton (1887). The timber-built offices were above the up line. In 1895 Elswick issued more tickets than other Carlisle line intermediate stations, except Blaydon.

In June 1962, the awnings and over-track building were demolished. The station closed on 2 January 1967, and the platform was swiftly demolished. Track realignment removed all trace of the station.

On 4 October 1982 passenger services ceased to use the Newcastle – Scotswood – Blaydon route. Trains were diverted from Newcastle West Junction over King Edward Bridge, then via Norwood Junction and Dunston to Blaydon. Tracks were removed from Scotswood Bridge and eastward beyond Elswick, leaving only a one-mile siding from Newcastle.

== Accident ==
In September 1909 a derailment occurred about 500 yards (460 m) east of Elswick station. NER 4-6-0 No. 2115 collided with Elswick No 9, an Industrial 0-4-0 outside cylinder Hunslet 0-4-0ST HL2106 of 1888. 2115 was derailed, overturned, and fell down below the main line killing one of the footplate crew, John Shilladay. Shilladay (or Shilliday, or Shillady, spelling was rather arbitrary in those days) was born in 1872 at Carlisle the son of a railway passenger guard. His father was Irish and his mother Scottish, he had 9 brothers and sisters. By 1891 he was a railway fireman at Carlisle and by 1901 had been married, had 3 children and moved to Gateshead as a fireman. When he was killed at Elswick in 1909 he left a son and 4 daughters.

Preceding station	Disused railways	Following station
Newcastle Central; Line closed, station open	North Eastern Railway; Newcastle & Carlisle Railway	Scotswood Works Halt; Line and station closed
