= Corporate Headquarters Office Technology System =

Corporate Headquarters Office Technology System (CHOTS) was a restricted electronic mail and office administration system used by the Ministry of Defence of the United Kingdom.

The system, designed, built, implemented and managed by Fujitsu supported 25,000 civilian and forces personnel and allowed an additional 70,000 MOD staff to communicate securely via its network. Access to information was domain-based, with links to MOD messaging systems. It was operational at 24 HQ locations and more than 200 subsidiaries in the UK, Europe and the USA.

In addition, Fujitsu developed a version for the Army, CASH, that supports 4,500 workstations in the UK, Germany and Northern Ireland.

CHOTS has been replaced by DII (Defence Information Infrastructure) at all locations.

== Sources ==
- NAO report (HC 328 Session 1999-00)
- CHOtS / DIIC Case Study by Fujitsu
