= Benwell and Scotswood =

Coordinates: 54.974°N 1.669°W

Benwell & Scotswood
- Ward
- Benwell and Scotswood highlighted within Newcastle upon Tyne

- Location within Tyne and Wear
- OS grid reference: NZ213644
- Metropolitan borough: Newcastle upon Tyne
- Metropolitan county: Tyne and Wear
- Ceremonial county: Tyne and Wear
- Region: North East
- Country: England
- Sovereign state: United Kingdom
- Post town: Newcastle upon Tyne
- Postcode district: NE15
- Dialling code: 0191
- Police: Northumbria
- Fire: Tyne and Wear
- Ambulance: North East
- UK Parliament: Newcastle upon Tyne Central
- Councillors: Jeremy Beecham (Labour); Rob Higgins (Labour); Hazel Stephenson (Labour)

Benwell and Scotswood is an electoral ward of Newcastle upon Tyne in North East England. The ward encompasses the portion of Benwell that falls into NE15 while the other portion that falls into NE4 is in the Elswick ward. This ward also encompasses Scotswood housing areas, Denton Burn housing areas, as well as the Newcastle Business Park, which is located on the banks of the River Tyne and houses offices of companies such as British Airways and the Automobile Association. The population of the ward is 13,759, which is 5.3% of the total population of Newcastle upon Tyne. Car ownership in the area is 45.1%, lower than the city average of 54.7%. The 2011 Census gave a population of 12,694.

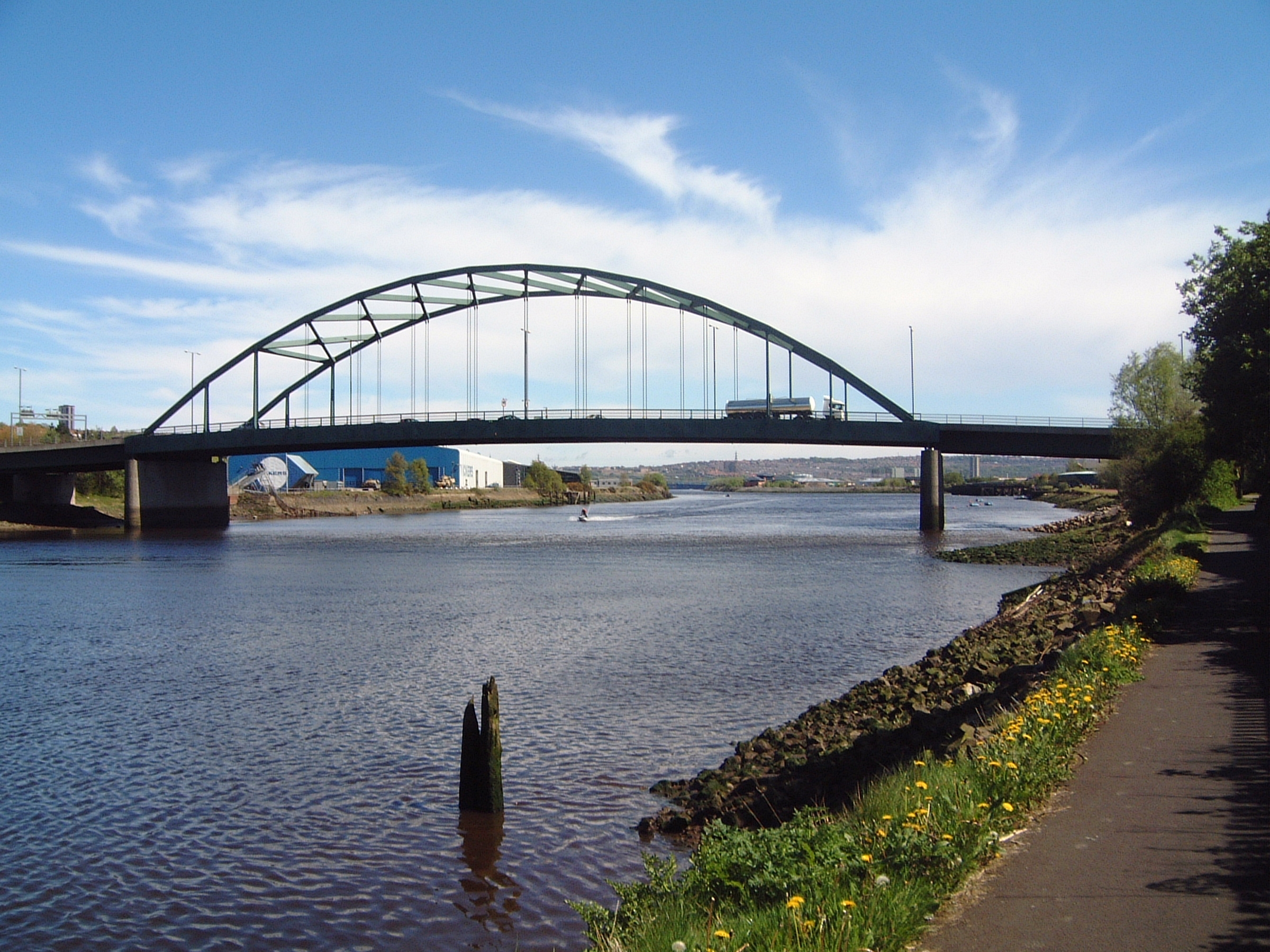
Scotswood Bridge across the River Tyne.

== History ==
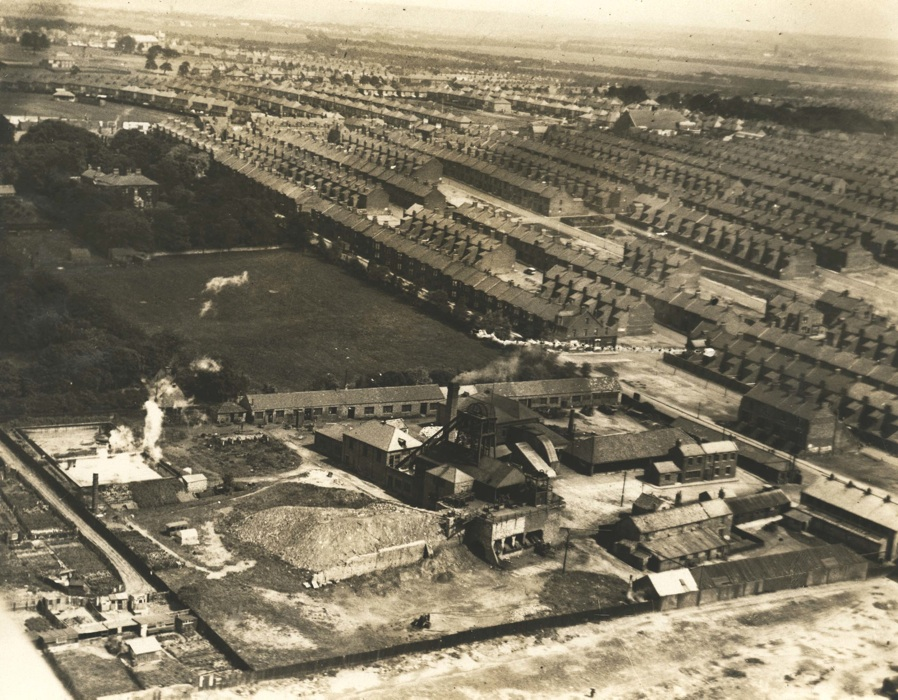
Charlotte Pit in Benwell around 1935.

Scotswood grew during the industrial revolution and provided labour for the huge Vickers Armstrong military engineering group formerly Armstrong Whitworth. Scotswood Road, which Vickers Armstrong used to dominate, is a main route along the Tyne and is mentioned in the song "Blaydon Races".

The Scotswood Bridge, which was known as the Chain Bridge, was the first bridge to be built over the Tyne in the industrial era. It opened in 1831 and was in use until 1967 when it had been superseded by a more modern structure, and was hence demolished.

Benwell and Scotswood were both sites of a number of coalmines. On 30 March 1925 the Montague Main Colliery Disaster occurred, caused by an inrush of water from the nearby disused Paradise Pit and resulting in the loss of 38 lives.

Scotswood railway station was served by the Newcastle and Carlisle Railway between 1839 and 1967.

The Fenham and Benwell district formed an independent urban district, which was incorporated into the City of Newcastle upon Tyne in 1904.

The site came to attention in the summer of 1968 for being the scene where two male toddlers Martin Brown, aged 4, and Brian Howe, aged 3, were found dead, after being strangled to death by Mary Bell.

== Boundaries ==
The boundary of the Benwell and Scotswood ward starts at the West Road/A1 roundabout southbound along the A1 to the River Tyne, then east to the Scotswood Road and William Armstrong Drive junction. Northbound, the boundary joins Buddle Road and continues along St Johns Road to Elswick Road. The boundary then heads west onto Adelaide Terrace to the Hodgkin Park Road junction and continues north to the rear of the allotment gardens and Lismore Place. The boundary moves to the west behind Denhill Park properties to Pendower Hall School and follows the school's eastern perimeter north to the West Road to the A1.

== Education ==
The ward has two nursery schools, five primary schools, two secondary schools, with one being an all-through school and a school for children with specific needs.

== Recreation and leisure ==
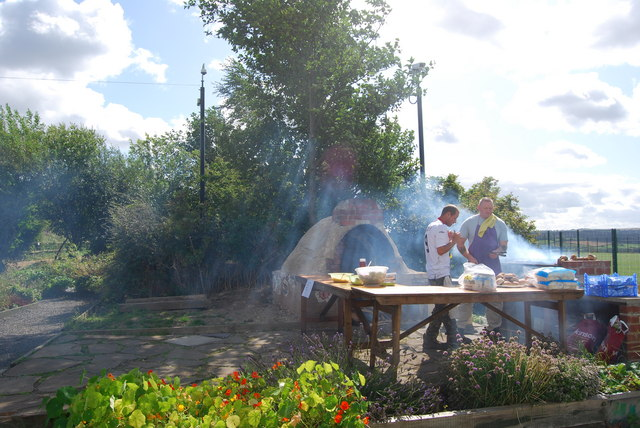
Scotswood Community Garden, 2009.

The ward has both the West End Library and Denton Burn Library, which have computers with free internet access. The West End library holds the West Newcastle Picture History Collection of around 17,000 images of the West End, some taken by Jimmy Forsyth. Benwell Nature Park and Denton Dene South are located within the ward. Scotswood Leisure Centre hosts various sports clubs and fitness classes. The ward contains three pieces of Play Provision, provided by Newcastle Play Service.

These are the Lillia Play Sessions, held at the Lillia Youth Centre and two playcentres: Scotswood Playcentre and Benwell Playcentre. These provide free open access sessions five days a week to children 5–12 (older children with disabilities and additional needs are also welcome).

Scotswood Community Garden was founded in 1995 on the playing field of the old Whickham View School. It offers a wide range of nature-based sessions and activities to local people of all ages and abilities. It has been awarded the Green Flag Community Award for 20 consecutive years. In 2012 a Sculpture Trail was created which involved the creation of four sculptures by artists working with local community groups.

West End RFC is a local amateur rugby club which plays its home matches at All Saints Sports Centre.

== Charts ==
Age group	Number
Under 16	3,011
16–24	1,569
25–44	3,907
45–64	3,055
65–74	1,154
75+	1,045

Ethnicity	Number	%
White	13,161	95.8
Afro-Caribbean	35	0.3
South Asian	398	2.9
Chinese	27	0.2
Other	112	0.8

The ward has 6,411 housing spaces, 6.4% being vacant, higher than the city average of 5.3%. Owner-occupied properties stand at 46.9%, also lower than the city average of 53.3%. The properties are as follows:

Property type	Number	%
Detached	406	6.3
Semi-detached	3,003	46.8
Terraced	1,404	21.9
Flats	1,601	24.9
Other	3	0
