= Benwell Nature Park =

Park in Newcastle upon Tyne, United Kingdom

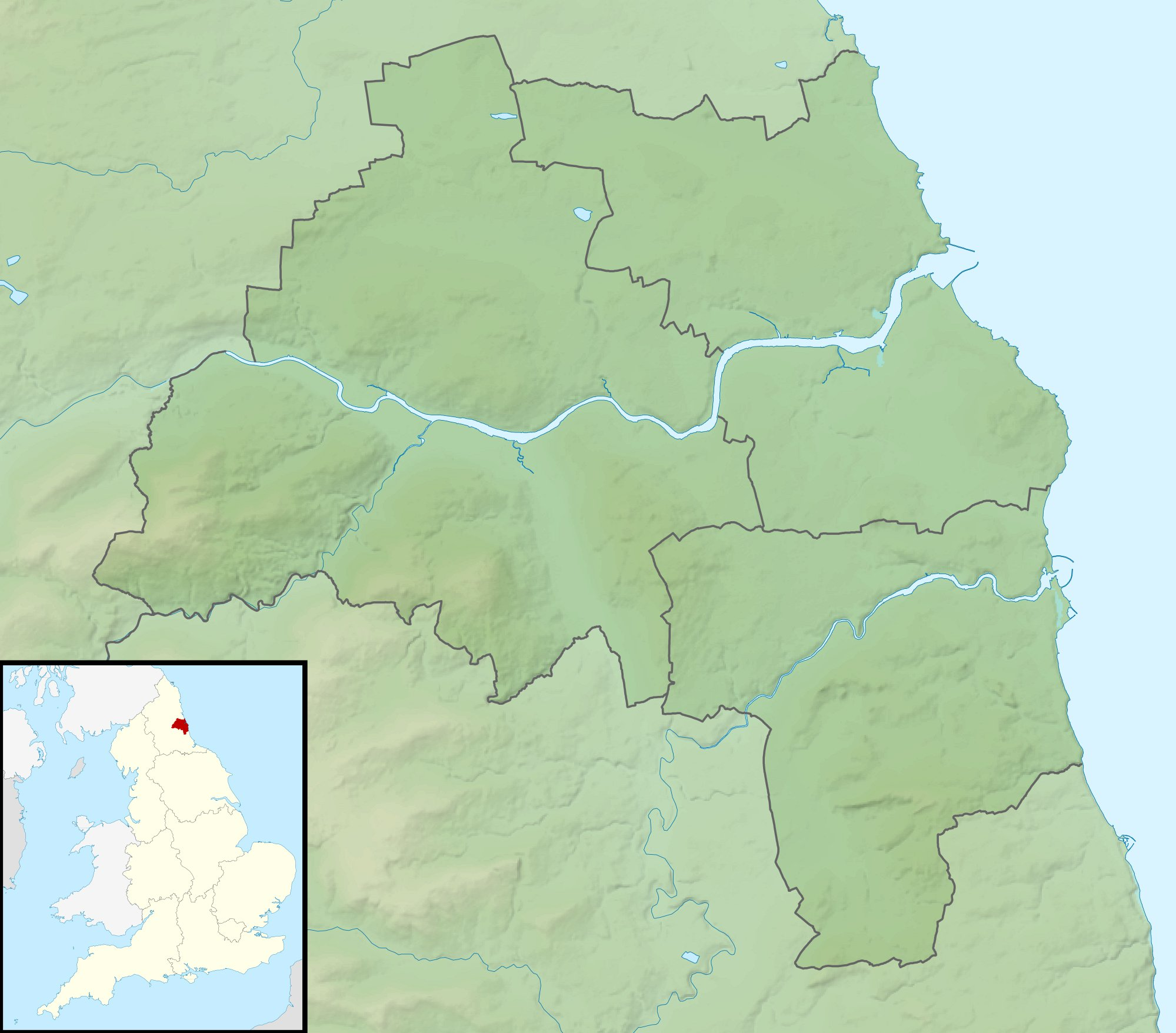
- Location within Tyne and Wear
- Interactive map of Benwell Nature Park
- OS grid: NZ212644
- Coordinates: 54.975°N 1.67°W

Benwell Nature Park is a Local Nature Reserve in Benwell, Newcastle upon Tyne, England. Many natural habitats have been established including a pond and marsh, meadows and hedgerows, woodlands and stone outcrops. A picnic area near the pond and a herb garden close to the Park Building have also been created.

The park came into being in 1982 after the demolition of two streets, Joan and Helen Street, and half of Atkinson Road. All that remains visible of these streets now is a length of cobbled back lane at the southwest corner of the park. A community orchard was planted in 2004 to mark the 21st anniversary of the park.

Its creation has been largely due to involvement of the local community, volunteers and the city's schoolchildren. The park has won many awards and accolades over the years including the Green Flag Award, and from Northumbria in Bloom.
