= Scotswood railway station =

Former railway station in England

Scotswood
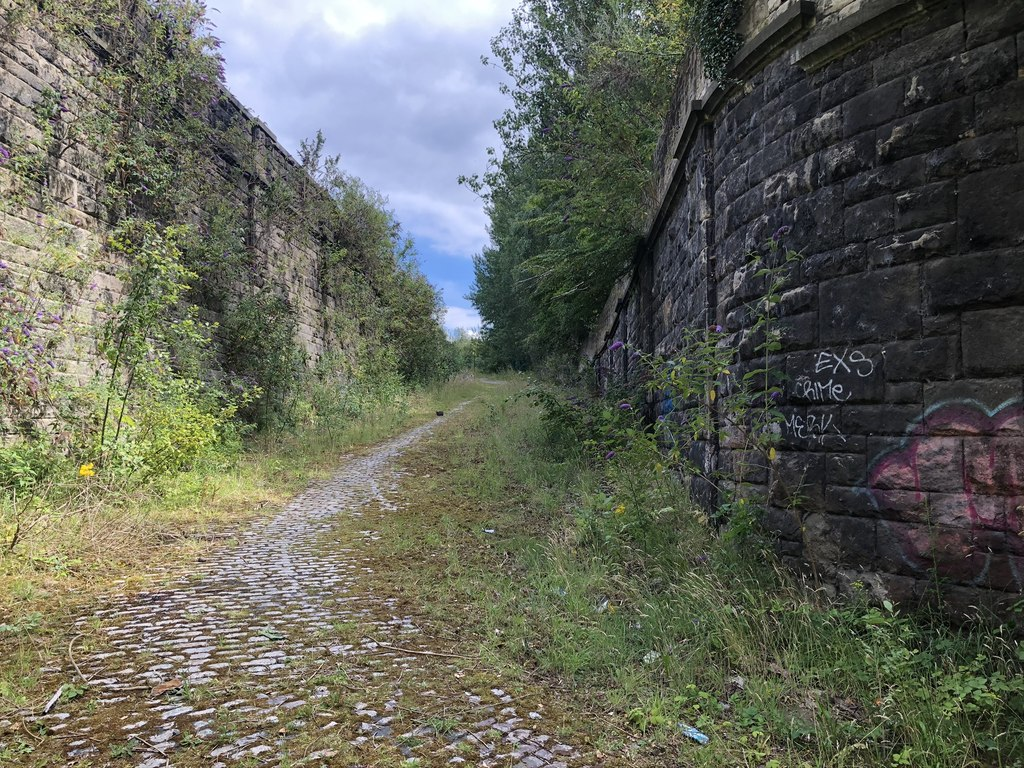
- The site of the station in 2020

General information
- Location: Scotswood, Newcastle upon Tyne; England
- Coordinates: 54.969°N 1.686°W
- Grid reference: NZ201638
- Platforms: 4

Other information
- Status: Disused

History
- Original company: Newcastle and Carlisle Railway; Scotswood, Newburn and Wylam Railway
- Pre-grouping: North Eastern Railway
- Post-grouping: London and North Eastern Railway; North Eastern Region of British Railways

Key dates
- 21 October 1839: South platforms opened
- 12 July 1875: North platforms opened
- 15 September 1958: North platforms closed
- 26 April 1965: Goods services withdrawn
- 1 May 1967: South platforms closed
Location

Scotswood railway station served Scotswood in Newcastle upon Tyne, England. The railway station was located on the former route of the Newcastle and Carlisle Railway from Newcastle upon Tyne to Carlisle. The station opened in 1839 and closed in 1967.

== History ==
The South platforms (Blaydon line) opened 21 October 1839; the North platforms (North Wylam loop) opened 12 July 1875. The South platform (Blaydon line) service was suspended on 3 September 1966 and the station closed to passengers on 1 May 1967. The buildings and platforms were demolished within five years.

Despite having platforms serving different lines (and, officially, different companies at first), Scotswood was regarded as a single station. The northern pair of platforms on the Newburn line was added to the southern pair on the Newcastle–Blaydon line in 1875. Curving away from the original platforms, they were at a higher level, and ended some 50yds to the east.

The original station buildings burned down on 17 October 1879. By the mid-1880s new buildings, including waiting sheds, were completed, and the two sets of platforms were connected by bridge and subway. The new station building, at the east end of the southernmost platform, was a modest brick structure with a small awning. It was accompanied by a wooden pitched-roof building. A similar wooden structure accommodated office and waiting facilities on the opposite platform. Two further, equally unimposing, wooden buildings served the northern platforms.

The station was busy in its early years; in 1895 there were 144,462 tickets issued. Usage declined after the 1930s as people chose to travel by bus instead. By 1951 only 17,180 tickets were issued to passengers. Services became infrequent in later years.

On 4 October 1982 passenger services ceased to use the Newcastle – Scotswood – Blaydon route. Trains were diverted from Newcastle West Junction over King Edward Bridge, then via Norwood Junction and Dunston to Blaydon. Tracks were removed from Scotswood Bridge and eastward beyond Elswick, leaving only a one-mile siding from Newcastle.

== Scotswood Tunnel ==
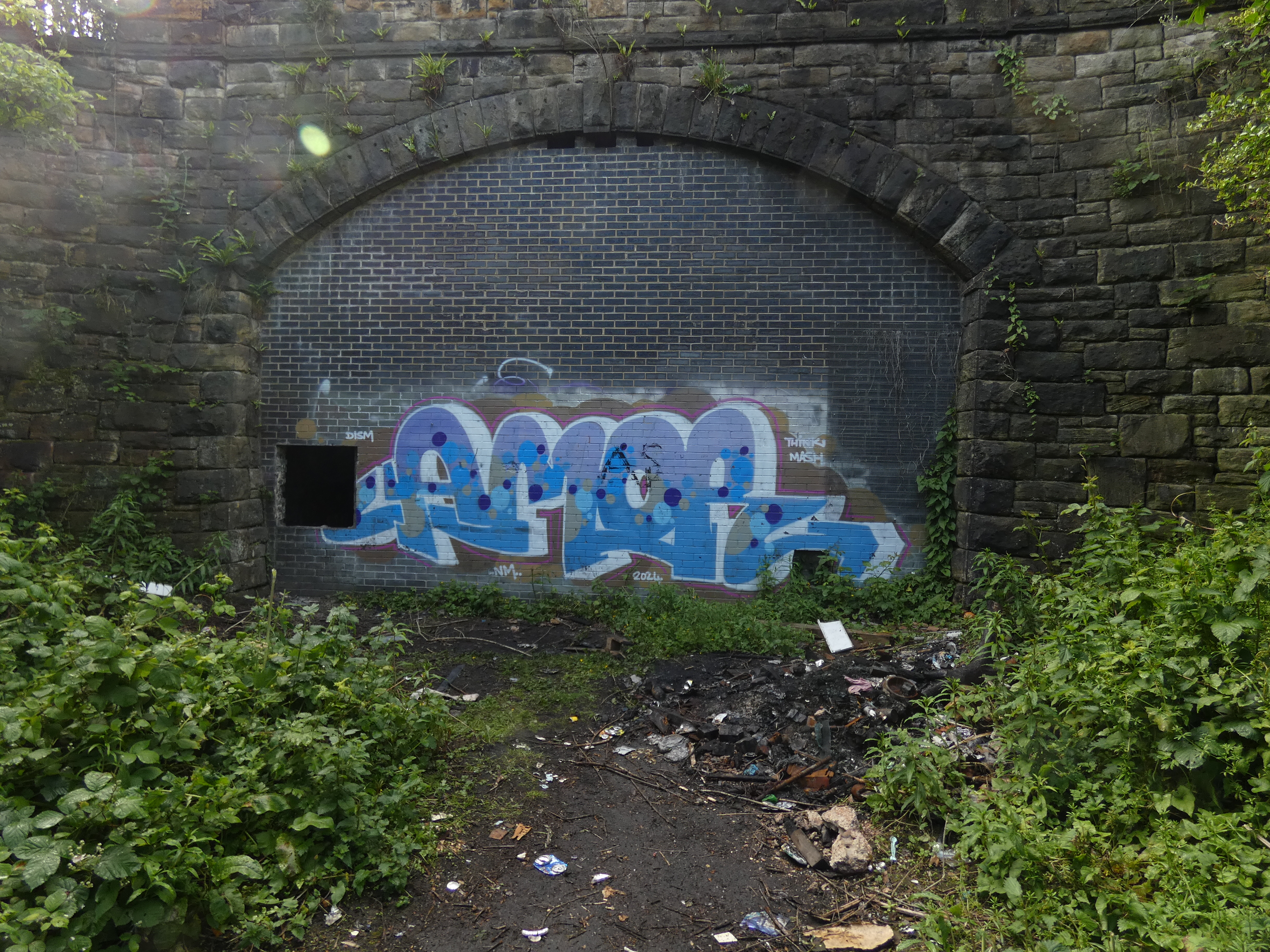
Scotswood Tunnel

To the west side of the station is Scotswood Tunnel, this was where the railway line went to follow the North side of the river Tyne until it merged with the Newcastle and Carlisle Railway at Hagg Bank Bridge near Wylam. Other tunnels are in the area, which provided pedestrian access to the industry which once existed in the area. These have long since been blocked off and the entrances buried.

The main railway tunnel has three entrances, one near Scotswood station, one leading towards Scotswood bridge and the other comes out near the A1. After the railway was removed, part of the tunnel was refurbished as a cycle tunnel, allowing passage from the A1 entrance to the Scotswood bridge entrance. This was quickly closed by the council due to anti-social behaviour.

Today all entrances are either bricked up or in-filled to prevent access. Occasionally people have broken in through the station entrance, which currently is only bricked up.

Before being completely closed off, the tunnel was used in the 1995 Famous Five episode entitled "Five Go off to Camp".

Preceding station	Disused railways	Following station
Scotswood Works Halt; Line and station closed	North Eastern Railway; Newcastle and Carlisle Railway	Blaydon; Line closed, station open
Scotswood Works Halt; Line and station closed	North Eastern Railway; Newcastle and Carlisle Railway	Lemington; Line and station closed
Terminus	North Eastern Railway; Derwent Valley Railway	Swalwell; Line and station closed
