= Ryton railway station =

Former railway station in England

Coordinates: 54°58′45″N 1°45′40″W

Ryton

General information
- Location: Ryton, Gateshead; England

Other information
- Status: Disused

History
- Original company: Newcastle and Carlisle Railway
- Pre-grouping: North Eastern Railway
- Post-grouping: London and North Eastern Railway

Key dates
- 9 March 1835: Station opened
- 5 July 1954: Station closed
Location

Ryton railway station was a station in Ryton, Tyne and Wear, England. The station was near the Newcastle-to-Carlisle railway, which roughly follows the course of the river along its south bank. With the opening of that railway, initially between Blaydon and Hexham, in 1835, a rail station was built to serve the village, and remained in use until 1954.

Waiting rooms on both platforms were of wooden construction, and an underground ticket office was located beneath the station, within a short tiled tunnel which allowed passenger access between platforms. "Stopping" trains between Newcastle and Hexham, unlike the Carlisle–Newcastle expresses, called at Ryton, then within the County of Durham. In the summertime, trains would bring day-trippers from the Tyneside metropolis to Ryton Willows, the strip of fairly level common land separating the river and the railway. Adjacent to the station was a tea-room, with nearby entertainments such as large swings, known locally as "shuggy-boats," and a fleet of rowing boats that were available for hire.

Some 250 metres of steep track linking the station to the village post-office was short for mail transport, but it was a climb for some disembarking passengers. So when a bus service using the A695 main road through the village was initiated during the 1930s, it greatly reduced the number of rail passengers. This situation was exacerbated when, in the early 1950s, a bus route was permitted which terminated in the lower village by the post office. The rail station closed on 5 July 1954, before the Beeching rail cuts were introduced, and today only the platforms and the tunnel remain. Rail users may use one of the remaining adjacent Tyne Valley stations at Blaydon or Wylam.
