= Hexham railway station =

Railway station in Northumberland, England

Hexham
- The sheds and platform 2

General information
- Location: Hexham, Northumberland, England
- Coordinates: 54°58′25″N 2°05′41″W
- Grid reference: NY940643
- Owner: Network Rail
- Manager: Northern Trains
- Platforms: 2
- Tracks: 2

Other information
- Station code: HEX
- Classification: DfT category D

History
- Original company: Newcastle and Carlisle Railway
- Pre-grouping: North Eastern Railway
- Post-grouping: London and North Eastern Railway, British Rail (North Eastern Region)

Key dates
- 9 March 1835: Opened

Passengers
- 2020/21: ▼80,300
- Interchange: ▼1,459
- 2021/22: ▲0.287 million
- Interchange: ▲4,904
- 2022/23: ▲0.336 million
- Interchange: ▼3,846
- 2023/24: ▲0.395 million
- Interchange: ▲4,884
- 2024/25: ▲0.431 million
- Interchange: ▲5,679

Listed Building – Grade II
- Feature: Station buildings, platforms, canopies and footbridge
- Designated: 22 February 1988
- Reference no.: 1370815
Location
- Location within Northumberland
Notes
- Passenger statistics from the Office of Rail and Road

Hexham is a railway station on the Tyne Valley Line, which runs between Newcastle and Carlisle. The station serves the market town of Hexham, in Northumberland, England; it is situated 22 miles 22 chains (22.3 mi; 35.8 km) west of Newcastle. It is owned by Network Rail and managed by Northern Trains, which also operates all services.

== History ==
The Newcastle and Carlisle Railway was formed in 1829, and was opened in stages. The station opened in March 1835, following the commencement of passenger trains between Blaydon and Hexham. The line was extended from Hexham to Haydon Bridge in June 1836.

After the Newcastle and Carlisle Railway had been absorbed by the North Eastern Railway, the station became a junction, with the opening of the first section of the Border Counties Railway, between Hexham and Chollerford in April 1858. The first section of a second branch, the Hexham and Allendale Railway, was opened for goods in August 1867. Initially promoted to serve lead mines, the line opened for passengers in March 1869.

Since the closure of the Hexham and Allendale Railway to passengers in 1930 (completely in 1950), as well as the Border Counties Railway in 1956 (completely in 1958), the station has diminished in size and importance. Both lines met with the Tyne Valley Line to the west of the station.

The neighbouring station at Fourstones, located to the west of Hexham, closed in January 1967. Most other stations on the line that remained open, escaping the Beeching Axe, were reduced to unstaffed halt status in the same year.

The bay platform used by both the Hexham and Allendale Railway and the Border Counties Railway was located on the southern side of the station, and faced west. It was taken out of use in the early 1970s and the track lifted, with the land now forming a part of the station car park. The track layout has also since been rationalised, with just a running loop and three sidings retained at the east of the station, along with the distinctive elevated signal box.

Dating from around 1835, Hexham is one of the oldest purpose-built railway stations in the world, and is Grade II listed. The over-line, elevated signal box, located to the east of the station, is also Grade II listed. Constructed in 1896, and once a popular design for the line, it is now almost unique, with the only other surviving signal box of this design located at Wylam.

Since the mid-2000s, the station has accommodated office space for the Tyne Valley Community Rail Partnership, who opened a kiosk at the station in 2011.

The floral displays at the station have won several awards from the Britain in Bloom scheme.

=== Redevelopment ===
In 2013 and 2014, a major Network Rail-managed redevelopment scheme was undertaken – at a cost of £8 million. This saw the regeneration of the former goods yard on the south east side of the station, with the construction of Broadgate Retail Park.

As well as this, the project also saw the Victorian railway stables relocated to Beamish Museum in County Durham, with the goods shed buildings retained and repurposed. On the north side of the station, a new station entrance and car park were created, creating step-free access to the Newcastle-bound platform, which had previously been accessible only by the pre-grouping metal footbridge.

=== Accidents and incidents ===
On 8 September 1943, ammunition exploded whilst being loaded onto a railway cart at the station. Three men were killed, whilst two others crawled underneath the burning carts, in order to disconnect them and prevent further explosions.

The station building

== Facilities ==
The station is staffed on a part-time basis. The station has two platforms, each of which has two self-service ticket machines (which accept card or contactless payment only), seating, waiting room, next train audio and visual displays and an emergency help point. Step-free access is available to both platforms, with platforms also linked by a barrow crossing (with assistance only) and footbridge.

The station also contains retail and dining outlets, toilets and a taxi office. There is a small pay and display car park and cycle storage at the station.

Hexham is part of the Northern Trains penalty fare network, meaning that a valid ticket or promise to pay notice is required prior to boarding the train.

There is a bus stop and a taxi rank outside the station, with connections also available at the nearby Hexham Bus Station, which is located a short distance from the station at Loosing Hill.

== Services ==
As of the December 2025 timetable change, there are three trains per hour between Newcastle and Hexham, two of which extend to Carlisle. One train serves all local stops to Newcastle, the others run express (Prudhoe and MetroCentre only). Some trains continue to Middlesbrough, via Hartlepool. Westbound, one service is limited stop, whilst the other calls at all stations.

During the evenings and on Sundays, an hourly service operates between Newcastle and Carlisle. All services are operated by Northern Trains. The winter 2025 timetable change saw the end of regular trains to Morpeth, though connections are still available at Newcastle.

Rolling stock used: Class 156 Super Sprinter and Class 158 Express Sprinter

Preceding station	National Rail	Following station
Corbridge towards Newcastle	Northern Trains; Tyne Valley Line	Haydon Bridge towards Carlisle
	Historical railways	
Terminus	North British Railway; Border Counties Railway	Wall
Terminus	North Eastern Railway; Hexham and Allendale Railway	Elrington Halt
Corbridge	North Eastern Railway; Newcastle and Carlisle Railway	Fourstones
