= Scotswood, Newburn and Wylam Railway =

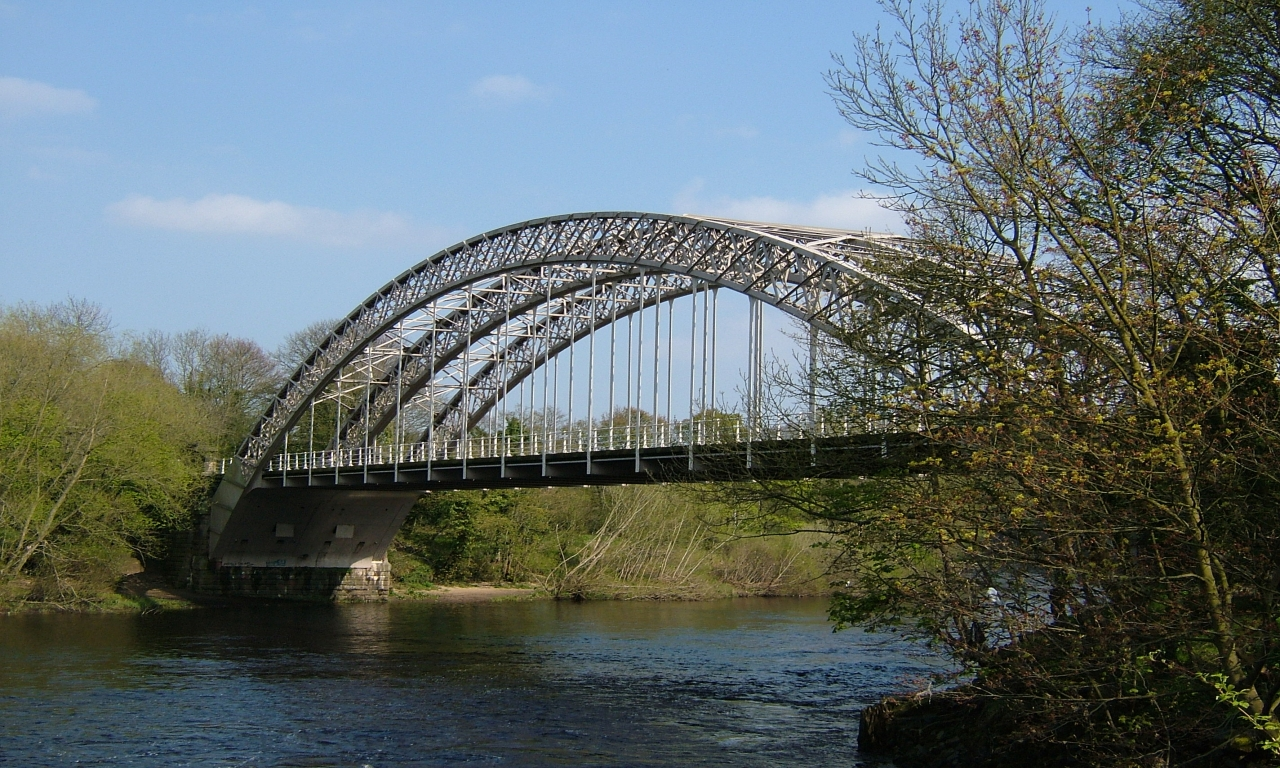
Wylam Railway Bridge, built by the Scotswood, Newburn and Wylam Railway, is today a Grade II* listed structure.

The Scotswood, Newburn and Wylam Railway was a railway company that built the 6 1/2 miles (10.5 km) North Wylam branch or North Wylam loop on the former Newcastle and Carlisle Railway. The loop line opened between 1871 and 1876 and followed the former Wylam waggonway past the cottage where George Stephenson was born. The company was taken over by the North Eastern Railway in 1883.

Following Dr Beeching's report in 1963 it was proposed that the original Newcastle & Carlisle line should close between Scotswood and Wylam. However, this was unsuccessful, and it was the Scotswood, Newburn and Wylam line that closed in 1968. Today, the route is part of the Hadrian’s Cycleway.

== Opening ==
The Newcastle and Carlisle Railway (N&CR) built a line from Newcastle upon Tyne on Britain's east coast, to Carlisle, on the west coast. The railway began operating freight trains in 1834 between Blaydon and Hexham, and passengers were carried for the first time the following year. The rest of the line opened in stages: from Hexham to Haydon Bridge and isolated section in the west from Carlisle to Greenhead opened in 1836, the eastern section was extended to Redheugh on the south bank of the Tyne in 1837, and the two sections of line were linked allowing trains to operate between Redheugh and Carlisle in 1838. A bridge at Scotswood allowed a temporary station to open in Newcastle, north of the Tyne, in 1839, although Newcastle Central did not open until 1851. The Newcastle and Carlisle Railway became part of the larger North Eastern Railway in 1862.

Scotswood, Newburn, and Wylam Railway and Dock Act 1871
- Act of Parliament
- Parliament of the United Kingdom
- Long title: An Act to authorise the construction of Railways and Dock in the county of Northumberland, to be called "The Scotswood, Newburn, and Wylam Railway and Dock."
- Citation: 34 & 35 Vict. c. xlviii

Dates
- Royal assent: 16 June 1871

Text of statute as originally enacted

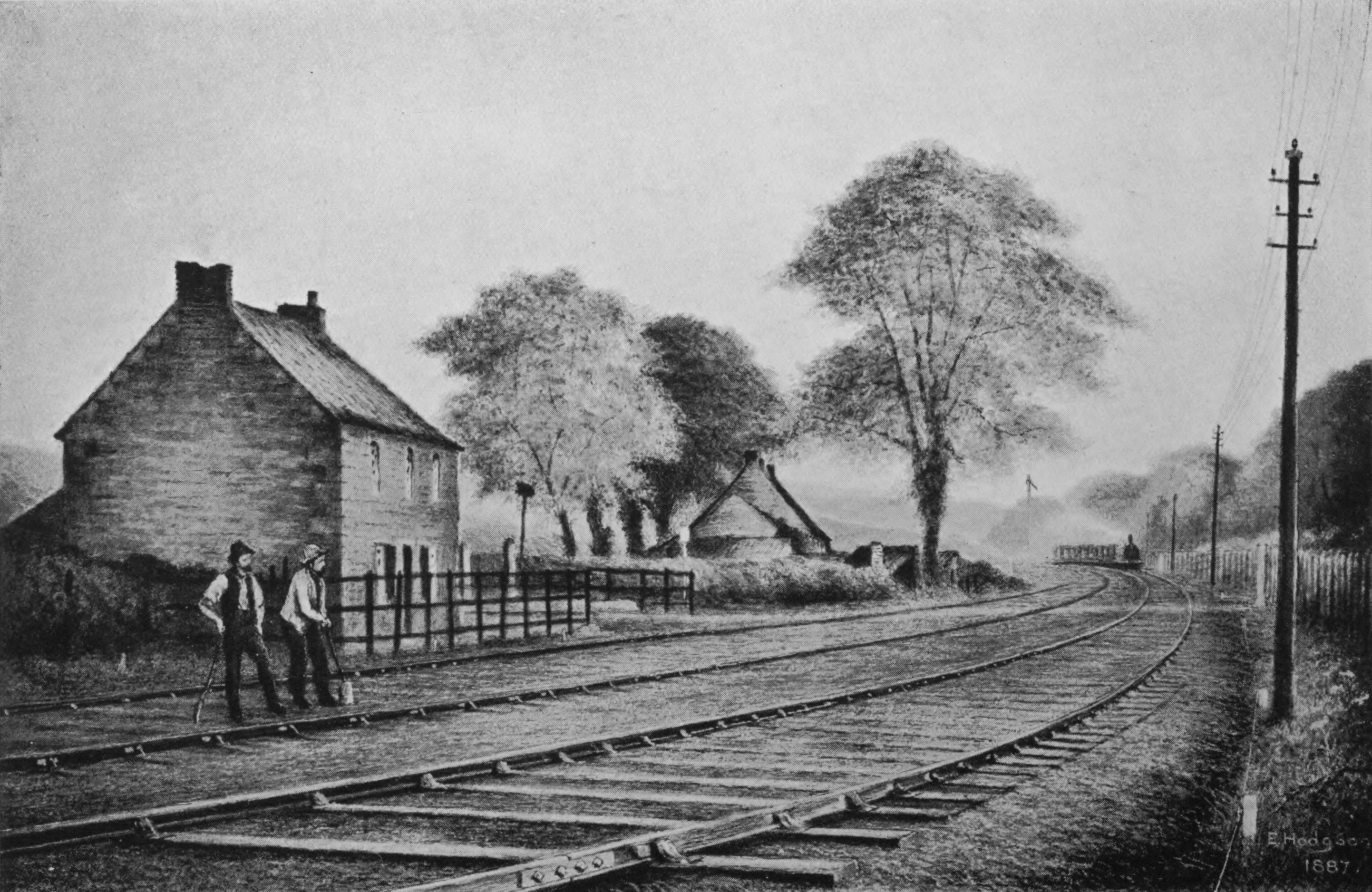
The railway passing the cottage in which George Stephenson was born

The Scotswood, Newburn and Wylam Railway and Dock received permission in the Scotswood, Newburn, and Wylam Railway and Dock Act 1871 (34 & 35 Vict. c. xlviii) on 16 June 1871 for a 6 1/4 miles (10.1 km) loop line on the north side of the Tyne between Scotswood and Wylam N&CR stations and a dock at Scotswood. The route of the line followed the Wylam Waggonway for a mile (1.6 km), past the cottage in which George Stephenson was born. Work officially started on 17 May 1872 and 2 1/2 miles (4.0 km) from the station at Scotswood to Newburn opened on 12 July, worked by the NER. The company was permitted to abandon plans for the dock in April 1876, dropping "and Dock" from its name. A single line opened between Newburn and Wylam opened on 13 May 1876. A second track opened on 24 August, and the wrought iron single span 240 feet (73 m) long Wylam bridge opened in October. The bridge was designed by William George Laws, an adaption of a design of a bridge over the River Aire at Leeds. On 6 October 1876 the bridge was tested with two tank and four tender locomotives, weighing at total of 333 tons.

== Operations ==
Stations opened on the line at Lemington, Newburn, Heddon-on-the-Wall and North Wylam. North Wylam, just across a bridge from Wylam station, served as a terminus for local trains from Newcastle.

The railway was absorbed by the North Eastern Railway via the North Eastern Railway (General) Act 1883 (46 & 47 Vict. c. lxiii). As a result of the Railways Act 1921, on 1 January 1923 the North Eastern Railway became part of the London and North Eastern Railway (LNER). In the 1930s the service between Newcastle Central and North Wylam was operated by Sentinel steam railcars; these were replaced by LNER Class G5 0-4-4T locomotives with a push-pull unit. Britain's railways were nationalised on 1 January 1948 and the line was placed under the control of British Railways. Diesel multiple units began to replace trains propelled by steam locomotives from 1955.

== Closure ==
Lemington, Newburn, Heddon-on-the-Wall stations closed in 1958. In 1963 Dr Beeching published his report "The Reshaping of British Railways", which recommended closing the network's least used stations and lines; both Wylam and North Wylam stations were included. In 1966 British Railways proposed that North Wylam station remain open and that September suspended services over the line south of the Tyne for engineering works, but this proposal was rejected and services restarted in May 1967. The following year BR proposed closing the line to the north of the Tyne, this was successful and passenger traffic withdrawn on 11 March 1968.

== Legacy ==
The Hadrian’s Cycleway now follows the route of the former railway between Scotswood and Wylam, using the former railway bridge to cross the Tyne.
