= Redheugh railway station =

Disused railway station in Gateshead, Tyne and Wear

Coordinates: 54.9614°N 1.6173°W

Redheugh

General information
- Location: Gateshead, Tyne and Wear; England
- Platforms: 2

Other information
- Status: Disused

History
- Original company: Newcastle and Carlisle Railway

Key dates
- 1 March 1837: Opened
- May 1854: Closed
Location

Redheugh railway station served the town of Gateshead, Tyne and Wear, England from 1837 to 1854 on the Newcastle and Carlisle Railway.

== History ==
The station opened on 1 March 1837 by the Newcastle and Carlisle Railway. It was originally the eastern terminus until Newcastle (Shot Tower) opened in 1839. To the west was a mineral line that carried passengers. There were two goods yard next to each other near a quay. There was also a locomotive shed that held up to two engines. Goods traffic ceased in 1853 and the station closed in May 1854.

Preceding station	Disused railways	Following station
Terminus	Newcastle and Carlisle Railway	Derwenthaugh; Line and station closed
