= Scotswood (disambiguation) =

Scotswood can refer to:

- Benwell and Scotswood
- Scotswood Railway Bridge
- Scotswood railway station
- Scotswood Bridge
