= Ovingham Bridge =

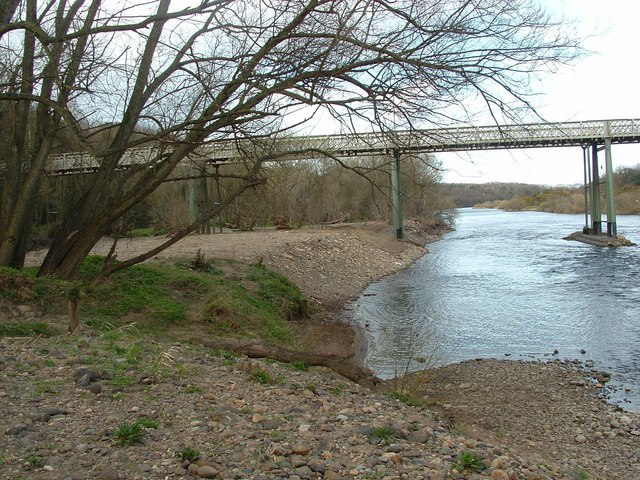
- Ovingham Bridge
- Coordinates: 54.9669°N 1.8668°W
- OS grid reference: NZ086636
- Carries: Motor vehicles; 72; Pedestrians
- Crosses: River Tyne
- Locale: Northumberland
- Owner: Northumberland County Council
- Maintained by: Northumberland County Council
- Preceded by: Bywell Bridge
- Followed by: Wylam Railway Bridge

Characteristics
- Design: Lattice Beam
- Pier construction: Steel
- Total length: 150 m (490 ft)
- No. of spans: 8
- Piers in water: 2
- No. of lanes: Single-track road with central passing place

History
- Fabrication by: Dorman Long & Co
- Construction start: 1883
- Construction end: 1883
- Opened: 20 December 1883
- Rebuilt: 2014–2016
- Replaces: Ferry

Ovingham Bridges are a pair of side-by-side vehicle and pedestrian bridges across the River Tyne linking Ovingham and Prudhoe in Northumberland, England. Following a lengthy refurbishment programme by Northumberland County Council, Ovingham Bridge re-opened to vehicles on 5 September 2016.

The vehicle bridge is a single track of reduced width for cars and light vans only. There is no footpath; pedestrians use the separate footbridge that runs alongside and with the same deck level. The centre piers are set wider, allowing the deck to spread and two vehicles can pass, although this is rare. No traffic controls are installed; drivers observe the far end and wait or enter the bridge using a set of unwritten rules that usually function well.

== History ==
It was built in 1883 by the Ovingham Bridge Company and replaced the earlier ferry. The steel tubes are marked Dorman Long Middlesbrough, the firm that designed and built the Sydney Harbour Bridge and the Tyne Bridge. It was originally opened and operated as a toll bridge until 1945.

The toll house has long since been demolished. It was located on the downstream side at the southern end of the bridge. In 1974 a footbridge was erected alongside, immediately downstream of the main bridge.

In 2009 both bridges underwent a strengthening programme as they had been closed during the January floods of 2005. Gabions were installed around the base of the pilings to prevent scour, and the river channel was dredged to direct the main flow away from the piers. As the original piling depths were not recorded, brackets were welded to the pilings and seismic pulse testing performed.

On 30 June 2014, the vehicle bridge was closed for extensive maintenance projected to take around 12 months. A small closing ceremony saw the last vehicle to cross – a horse and cart – as a reminder of the first vehicle to cross when it was originally opened. During May and June 2014, access trackways were built to the underside of both ends of the bridges, and extensive steel scaffolding installed below and to both sides of the bridge structure. The scaffolds incorporated wooden boarded cutwaters to protect the scaffold if the river should flood. Lattice long span 'unit beams' were fitted to all spans except the North and South. Concrete pads were cast below the bridge end spans adjacent to the approach roads so that the spans could be jacked up. This was to allow extensive modification of the area where the steel bridge rests on the stone abutment. New concrete structures were cast as pier caps and compliant pads installed to allow the entire span to expand and contract with seasonal temperature changes. The bridge deck including cross beams were completely replaced. The footbridge was also due to be closed and have new decking. Pedestrians were redirected to use the main bridge whilst this was underway.

Next bridge upstream	River Tyne	Next bridge downstream
Bywell Bridge; B6309	Ovingham Bridges; Grid reference NZ086636	Wylam Railway Bridge; Formerly North Wylam loop, now 72
Next road bridge upstream	River Tyne	Next road bridge downstream
Bywell Bridge; B6309	Ovingham Bridges; Grid reference NZ086636	Wylam Bridge
