= Bywell Bridge =

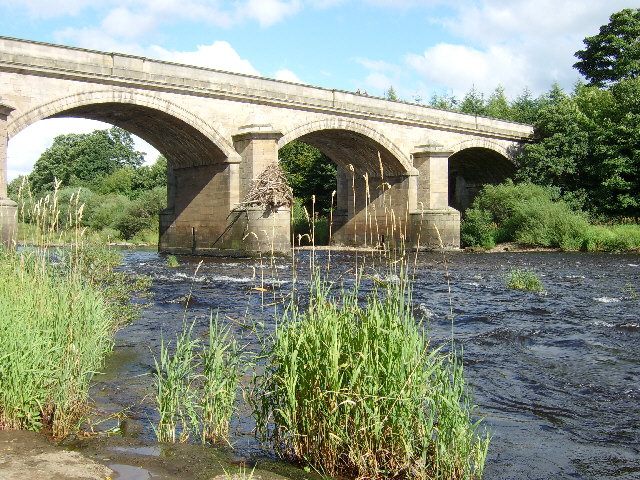
- Bywell Bridge
- Coordinates: 54.952°N 1.920°W
- OS grid reference: NZ052619
- Carries: B6309
- Crosses: River Tyne
- Locale: Northumberland
- Heritage status: Grade II listed
- Preceded by: Styford Bridge
- Followed by: Ovingham Bridges

Characteristics
- Design: Arch bridge
- Material: Ashlar stone
- No. of spans: 5
- No. of lanes: Single-track road

History
- Architect: George Basevi
- Construction start: 1836
- Construction end: 1838
- Construction cost: £15,000
- Opened: 1838

Bywell Bridge is a 19th-century stone bridge across the River Tyne. It is a Grade II listed building.

== History ==
The bridge was opened in 1838. It was built at a cost of £15,000, which was paid by the local landowner T W Beaumont. The designer was the architect George Basevi. The bridge joins Bywell and the adjoining roads with Stocksfield. It is of ashlar masonry, with five segmental arches crossing the river, and two flood arches, without parapets, to the south.

The remains of the piers of an ancient bridge, believed to be Roman, stood nearby until demolished on Beaumont's instructions when work on the present bridge began.

Next bridge upstream	River Tyne	Next bridge downstream
Styford Bridge; A68	Bywell Bridge; Grid reference NZ052619	Ovingham Bridges; Road, pedestrians and 72
