= Wylam Railway Bridge =

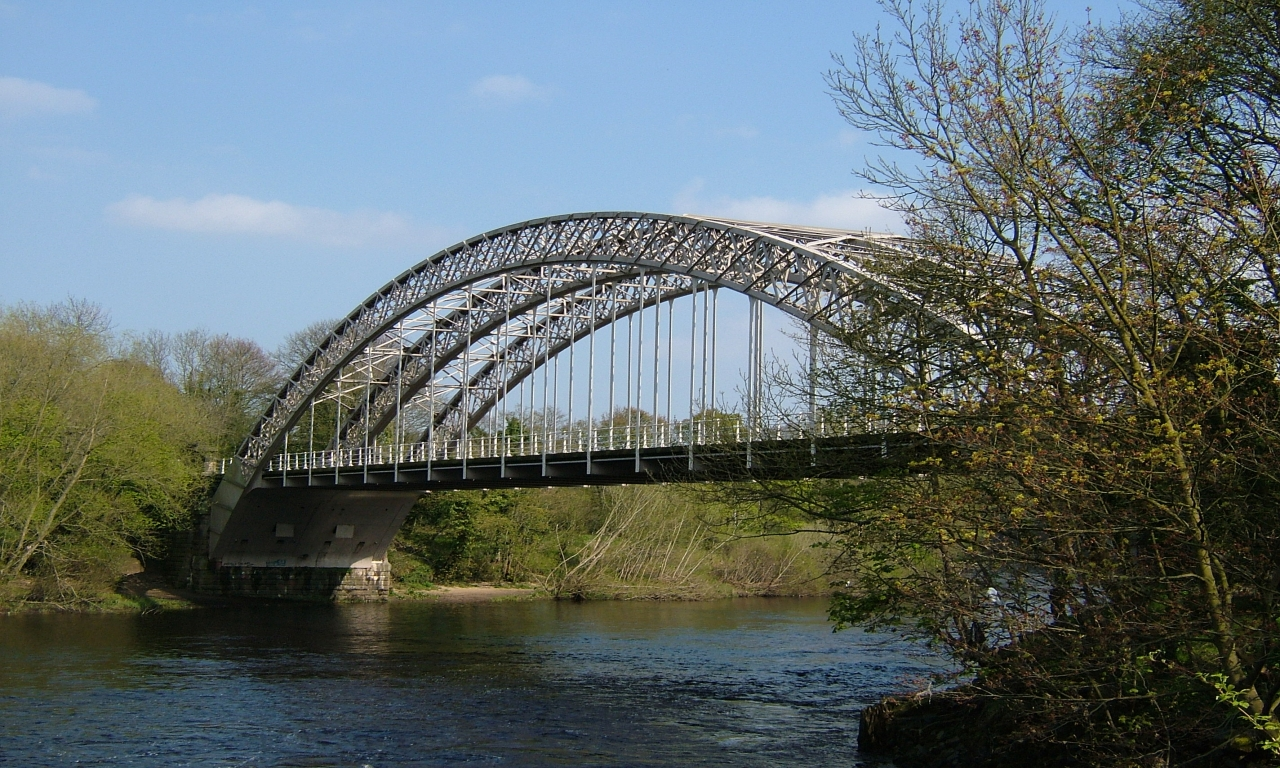
- Wylam Railway Bridge as seen from the south bank of the River Tyne
- Coordinates: 54.9730°N 1.8277°W
- OS grid reference: NZ111642
- Carries: 72; Pedestrians; (Formerly, North Wylam loop)
- Crosses: River Tyne
- Locale: Northumberland
- Official name: West Wylam Bridge
- Other names: Hagg Bank Bridge; Points Bridge; Half-Moon Bridge
- Owner: Northumberland County Council
- Heritage status: Grade II* listed
- Preceded by: Ovingham Bridges
- Followed by: Wylam Bridge

Characteristics
- Design: Through arch bridge.
- Material: Wrought iron
- Pier construction: Stone
- Total length: 80 m (260 ft)
- Width: 6 m (20 ft)
- Height: 15 m (49 ft)
- Longest span: 73 m (240 ft)
- No. of spans: 1

History
- Designer: W G Laws
- Constructed by: W E Jackson & Co
- Fabrication by: Hawks, Crawshay and Sons
- Construction start: 1874
- Construction end: 1876
- Construction cost: £16,000
- Opened: 6 October 1876
- Closed: 11 March 1968, as a railway. Reopened as a footbridge in 1975.

Location
- Interactive map of Wylam Railway Bridge

Wylam Railway Bridge (officially West Wylam Bridge, also known as Hagg Bank Bridge and locally as Points Bridge and Half-Moon Bridge) is a footbridge and former railway bridge crossing the River Tyne at Hagg Bank, approximately 1/2 mile (0.8 km) west of Wylam in Northumberland, England.

== History ==
The bridge was originally built for the Scotswood, Newburn and Wylam Railway, to connect the North Wylam Loop with the Newcastle and Carlisle Railway.

A number of bodies were involved in the bridge's construction: W G Laws engineered the bridge, W E Jackson & Co. of Newcastle upon Tyne built the bridge's foundations and masonry, while Hawks, Crawshay and Sons of Gateshead manufactured the ironwork. The bridge cost £16,000 to build and was opened to rail traffic on 6 October 1876.

Railway services over the bridge ended in 1968 when the line was closed as part of the Beeching cuts. The trackwork was removed in 1972 and subsequently, in 1975, the bridge was converted into a footbridge and cyclepath linking Wylam with the Tyne Riverside Country Park at Low Prudhoe.

A model of the bridge can be seen at the nearby Wylam Railway Museum.

== Design ==
The bridge's design came about because there was a need to avoid having piers in the river bed, because their construction would have disrupted shallow mine workings underneath. This single span (73 m, 240 ft) is constructed of three ribs each connected with diagonal braces to prevent cross strain and distortion caused by the wind. The track is suspended from these ribs by 19 girders forming 20 bays each 3.6 m (12 ft) wide. Another notable design consideration is the height of the track above water-level. During the great flood of 1771, the Tyne rose to 7 m (23 ft) above its normal summer levels. This led to the destruction of most of the bridges along the River Tyne, including those at Hexham and the old Tyne Bridge at Newcastle. For this reason, the track is suspended 8.5 m (28 ft) above the river's typical level and 1 m (3 ft 3 in) greater than the flood level.

It has been suggested that Wylam Railway Bridge might have been an inspiration for the designers of the much later Tyne Bridge in Newcastle upon Tyne and the Sydney Harbour Bridge in Australia. However, there are some major differences in design between this bridge and those at Newcastle and Sydney. Perhaps the greatest difference is the load taken by the abutments of the bridge. In the cases of the Tyne and Sydney Harbour bridges the abutments or "pylons" bear no load from the single span arch and are aesthetic. The arch of this bridge, however, is anchored into the abutments and as such directly bears the lateral load of the arch. This prevents distortion and a possible "road-wave" forming in front of a traversing train or vehicle.

Wylam Railway Bridge is claimed to be one of the earliest rib arch bridges in the world and as such is grade II* listed citing the bridge as "...said to be the earliest use of this form of construction to carry railway".

== Renovation ==
In 1997 the bridge was re-painted at a cost of £224,000 with the support of £157,000 from the Heritage Lottery Fund. This work included removing the old lead-based paint and repainting with lead free alternatives in the bridges original colour scheme.

Next railway bridge upstream	River Tyne	Next railway bridge downstream
Warden Railway Bridge; Tyne Valley line	Wylam Railway Bridge; Grid reference NZ111642	Scotswood Railway Bridge; Disused (now carries water and gas mains)
Next bridge upstream	River Tyne	Next bridge downstream
Ovingham Bridges; Road, pedestrians and 72	Wylam Railway Bridge; Grid reference NZ111642	Wylam Bridge
