= Newburn Bridge =

Road and pedestrian bridge over the River Tyne, England

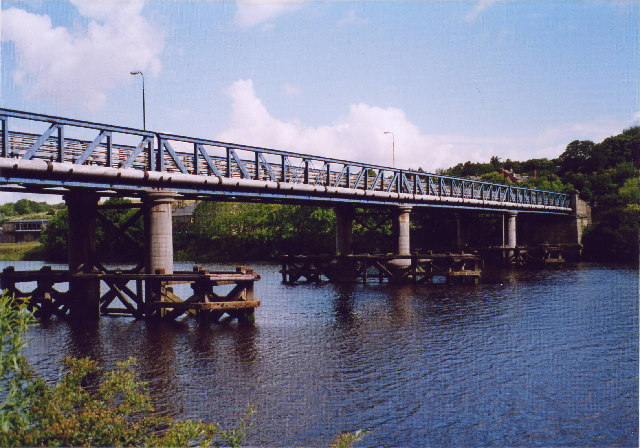
- Newburn Bridge viewed from the south east, June 2004
- Coordinates: 54.9807°N 1.7436°W
- OS grid reference: NZ165652
- Carries: Motor Vehicles; Cycles; Pedestrians
- Crosses: River Tyne
- Locale: Tyneside
- Preceded by: Wylam Bridge
- Followed by: Blaydon Bridge

Characteristics
- Design: Lattice girder bridge
- Material: Steel
- Pier construction: Wrought iron filled with concrete
- Total length: 144.8 m (475 ft)
- Width: 8.54 m (28 ft)
- No. of spans: 4
- Piers in water: 3
- Load limit: 10 t
- No. of lanes: Single carriageway controlled by traffic lights

History
- Designer: Sandeman & Moncrieff
- Constructed by: Head Wrightson
- Construction start: 1892
- Construction end: 1893
- Opened: 21 May 1893

Location
- Interactive map of Newburn Bridge

Newburn Bridge is a road bridge crossing the River Tyne at Newburn in Newcastle upon Tyne, England. It links Newburn, Walbottle and Throckley on the north side of the river with Ryton, Stella and Blaydon on the south side. The bridge is the westernmost crossing of the Tyne in the county of Tyne and Wear; the next crossing upstream, Wylam Bridge, is in Northumberland.

== History ==
This part of the river has been forded since Roman times because it is the most eastern part of the Tyne that is easily fordable. There have also been numerous ferries operated in the part of the river around Newburn. A bridge was finally built between 1892 and 1893. It was designed by Sandeman & Moncrieff of Newcastle and built by Head Wrightson of Thornaby-on-Tees. It was opened on 21 May 1893. For the first 50 or so years of its use, it was a toll bridge, until it was bought by Northumberland County Council in 1947. The toll house on the northeast side of the bridge has since been demolished. The bridge used to have two lanes crossing it up until the 1960s. It has since had single road traffic because of the weight limit of 9 tonnes (8.858 long tons; 9.921 short tons), later raised to 10 tonnes (9.842 long tons; 11.02 short tons).

In 2007 the bridge was closed for a number of months for renovation and repainting.

In 2018, the bridge was closed to vehicles for several months. It reopened in September 2018.

Next bridge upstream	River Tyne	Next bridge downstream
Wylam Bridge	Newburn Bridge; Grid reference NZ165652	Blaydon Bridge; A1
