= Head Wrightson =

Engineering company in North Yorkshire, England

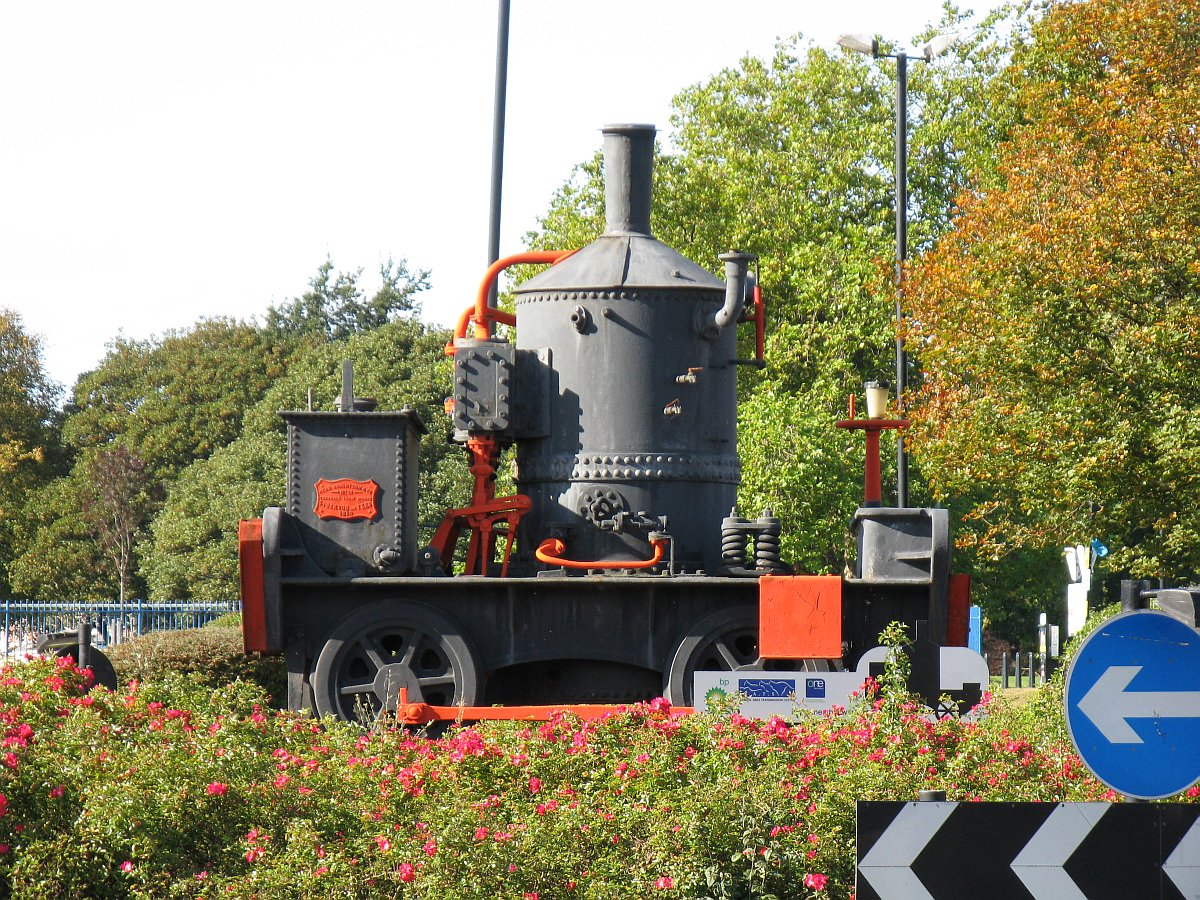
- Steam locomotive at Stockton-on-Tees
- Industry: Heavy engineering
- Founded: 1840
- Founder: Thomas Head and Joseph Wright
- Defunct: June 1987
- Fate: Closed
- Headquarters: Thornaby-on-Tees, England
- Products: Cast iron and Wrought iron

Head Wrightson was a big heavy industrial firm based at Thornaby-on-Tees, North Yorkshire, England. It specialised in the manufacture of large industrial products such as fractional distillation columns, which sometimes needed special transport to get them to site.

Its early products, which were made of cast iron or wrought iron, were used for boilers, railway chairs, naval ships, and many bridges across the world. In its first 17 years the firm had various names.

== History ==
- 1724 to 1839: Land called Thornaby Carrs was used intermittently for horse racing.
- (afterwards): There was a shipyard on Thornaby Carrs.
- about 1840: Mr. Skinner settled in South Stockton.
- 1840: The Teesdale Iron Works (also named Teesdale Ironworks) was founded.
- 1851: Teesside's first blast furnace was built, after iron ore was discovered in the Cleveland Hills.
- 1859: Mr. Skinner bought the Teesdale Iron Works. Thomas Head and Joseph Wright took over the Teesdale Iron Works.
- later: Joseph Ashby and Thomas Wrightson joined the firm and Joseph Wright retired.
- 1860: Mr. Skinner bought the Cotton Mill.
- (later): The firm became Messrs. Head and Wright, and later Messrs. Head and Ashby.
- 1865: The firm became Messrs. Head Wrightson & Co Ltd. It made cast iron and wrought iron for boilers, railway chairs, naval ships, and many bridges across the world, the largest being in India. The firm employed 450 people.
- 1866: The firm became Head Wrightsons.
- 1877: The firm completed the Chenab Bridge in British India. The bridge is between Rabwah & Chiniot.
- 1889: The firm completed Fulham Railway Bridge.
- 1890: The works was three times as big as in 1860, and covered Thornaby Carrs.
- 1892: The firm employed 1200 people.
- 1893: The firm completed Newburn Bridge.
- 1895: The firm completed Barnes Railway Bridge.
- 1939-45: Manufactured the Bellman hangar, a 1936 design for a standard transportable aeroplane shed for the Air Ministry.
- 1965: Building the ice rink structure for the Billingham Forum.
- 1968: The firm employed nearly 6000 people and mostly made boilers and other heavy engineering. Its factory covered 68 acres.
- 1977: Davy Corporation acquired Head Wrightson.
- 1979: Davy Corporation was renamed "Davy McKee".
- June 1987: Head Wrightsons closed.

== Bibliography ==
- Lowe, James W. (1989) [1975]. "Head Wrightson Co.". British Steam Locomotive Builders. London: Guild Publishing. pp. 319–320. ISBN 0900404213.
