= Flood arch =

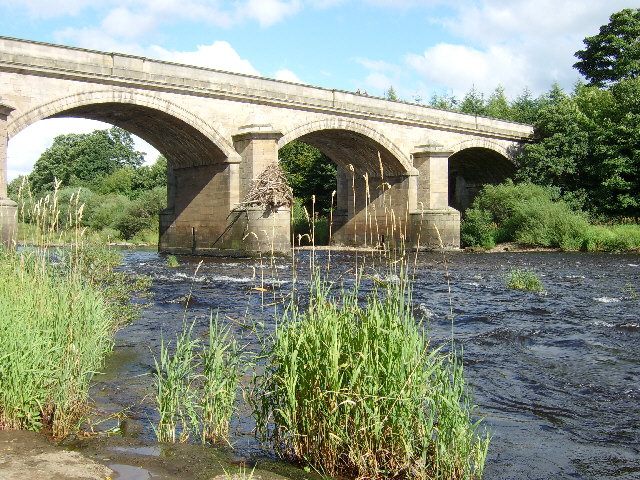
Bywell Bridge, two of the river spans with a flood arch beyond. The level of flooding can be seen by the driftwood caught above the cutwater

A flood arch is a small supplemental arch bridge provided alongside a main bridge. It provides extra capacity for floodwater.

The space beneath a flood arch is normally dry and often carries a towpath or similar. In some cases it borders on the shallow edge of a river, but this does not carry substantial flow in normal conditions. A bridge with multiple arches across a flowing river would instead be termed a viaduct.

For some bridges, flood arches were added after the first bridge had been constructed, often after initial flooding.

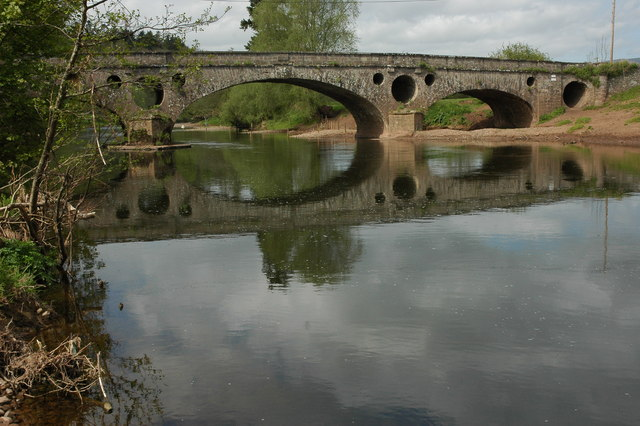
Pant-y-Goitre Bridge with both pierced spandrels and a flood arch
