= Hagg Bank =

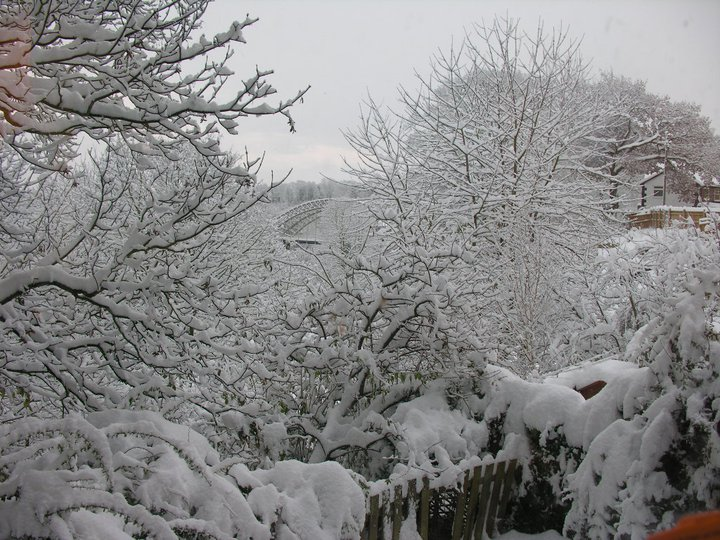
Wintery view of Hagg Bank Bridge from Hagg Bank

Hagg Bank or The Hagg is a small Northumberland enclave on the south bank of the River Tyne linked to Wylam by the Points Bridge. It consists of approximately 25 originally two-up, two-down brick terraces, built for housing railway and colliery workers at the turn of the 20th century, which have mostly been extended.

Hagg Bank is located on a bend in the river, so faces east, rather than north. It is popular spot for salmon fishing, walking and cycling as it is on the National Cycle Route 72. Hagg Bank Hill is a notorious one for walkers, runners and cyclists alike to ascend, and there is no footpath in several areas making it difficult to walk on for those accessing the road towards West Wylam. At the crest of the hill is West Wylam Allotments, which provides views of the dramatic Tyne Valley and even the urbanised areas of Newburn, Ryton and Newcastle on a sunny day. The bottom of the hill accesses the Tyne Riverside Country Park, a popular place for activities and leisure, as well as Wylam Railway Bridge (also known as Points Bridge) which eventually reaches the village of Wylam downstream on the Tyne and Wear border. Hagg Bank and the surrounding land were originally the deer park for Prudhoe Castle.
