= Blaydon Bridge =

Road bridge over the River Tyne, England

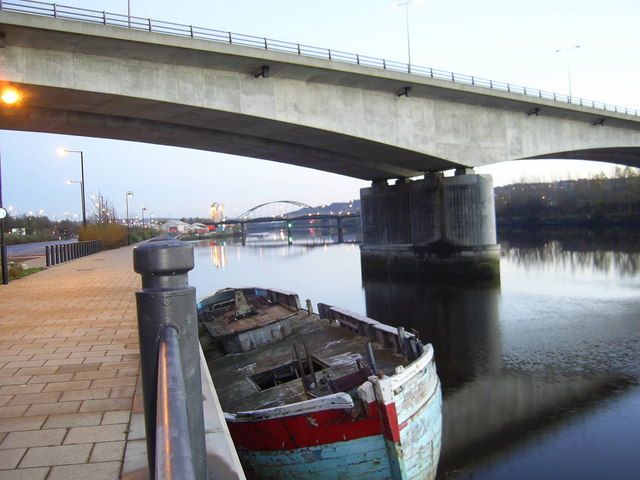
- Blaydon Road Bridge with Scotswood road and rail bridges in the background
- Coordinates: 54.9704°N 1.6978°W
- OS grid reference: NZ193640
- Carries: A1; Motor vehicles; Cycles
- Crosses: River Tyne
- Locale: Tyneside
- Owner: Department for Transport
- Maintained by: National Highways
- Preceded by: Newburn Bridge
- Followed by: Scotswood Railway Bridge

Characteristics
- Design: Haunched girder bridge; Box girder with balanced cantilevers
- Material: Pre-stressed concrete
- Total length: 332 m (363 yd)
- Width: 14.6 m (48 ft)
- Longest span: 108 m (118 yd)
- Piers in water: 2
- No. of lanes: 4

History
- Designer: Bullen and Partners
- Constructed by: Edmund Nuttall Ltd
- Construction start: 16 November 1987
- Construction end: 30 November 1990
- Opened: 1 December 1990
- Inaugurated: 1 December 1990; by Queen Elizabeth II

Location
- Interactive map of Blaydon Bridge

Blaydon Bridge is one of the main bridges crossing the River Tyne in North East England linking Scotswood in Newcastle upon Tyne and Blaydon in Metropolitan Borough of Gateshead.

The bridge was designed by Bullen and Partners and built by Edmund Nuttall Ltd between 1987 and 1990. It is a concrete bridge with two concrete piers in the river. When completed, it formed the link between the existing Gateshead Western By-pass and the newly constructed Newcastle-upon-Tyne Western By-pass. From the opening, it was designated as the A1 road: before the Blaydon Bridge was built the A1 crossed the Tyne to the east of Newcastle and Gateshead via the Tyne Tunnel. It was officially opened by the Queen on 1 December 1990.

Next bridge upstream	River Tyne	Next bridge downstream
Newburn Bridge	Blaydon Bridge; Grid reference NZ193640	Scotswood Railway Bridge; Disused (now carries water and gas mains)
Next road bridge upstream	River Tyne	Next road bridge downstream
Newburn Bridge	Blaydon Bridge; Grid reference NZ193640	Scotswood Bridge; A695
