= Wylam Bridge =

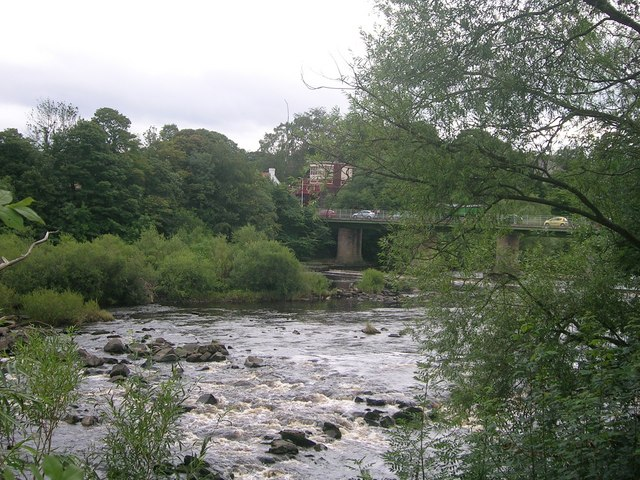
- Wylam Bridge, in 2007
- Coordinates: 54.9755°N 1.8152°W
- OS grid reference: NZ119645
- Carries: Motor vehicles; 141; Pedestrians
- Crosses: River Tyne
- Locale: Northumberland
- Owner: Northumberland County Council
- Maintained by: Northumberland County Council
- Preceded by: Wylam Railway Bridge
- Followed by: Newburn Bridge

Characteristics
- Design: Beam bridge
- Material: Steel
- Pier construction: Stone
- Total length: 360 ft (110 m)
- Width: 24 ft (7.3 m)
- No. of spans: Nine 40 ft (12 m) spans
- No. of lanes: Two

History
- Construction start: 1836
- Construction end: 1836
- Opened: 1836
- Rebuilt: 1897

Wylam Bridge is a road bridge in Northumberland, England linking the residential area of North Wylam and neighbouring villages of Heddon-on-the-Wall, and Horsley with the railway station in South Wylam as well as west Gateshead, including the villages of Ryton and Crawcrook.

== History ==
The River Tyne at Wylam has been forded for a very long time but because of the Industrial Revolution in Great Britain, a more suitable method of crossing the river at this point was required to link the ironworks on the north bank with the railway on the south bank so that goods could be taken to Newcastle upon Tyne and other parts of the country. At this time there was a waggonway on the north bank but it only went as far as Lemington. In 1836 a bridge was built over the river constructed from timber sections supported on stone piers, carrying road traffic and a waggonway. In 1897 the bridge ceased to be used for carrying the waggonway because of the construction of Wylam Railway Bridge. In the same year, the bridge was strengthened by being reconstructed using steel. A couple of years later in 1899, a new toll house was built on the north side of the bridge, although the original toll house on the south side still stood up until 1960. The toll for pedestrians to cross the bridge was one penny but in 1936 an opposition to the tolls led to the bridge being acquired by Northumberland County Council. The bridge was strengthened again during World War II in 1942 so that tanks and other heavy military vehicles could use it. Improvements to the bridge continued in the 1950s when two piers were replaced because of erosion and in 1959 when the bridge was widened to 24 ft (7.3 m). Improvements continued as recently as 2007 when the railings were strengthened following a fatal car crash in which three people died.

Next bridge upstream	River Tyne	Next bridge downstream
Wylam Railway Bridge; Formerly North Wylam loop, now 72	Wylam Bridge; Grid reference NZ119645	Newburn Bridge
