= Scotswood Bridge =

Road and pedestrian bridge over the River Tyne, England

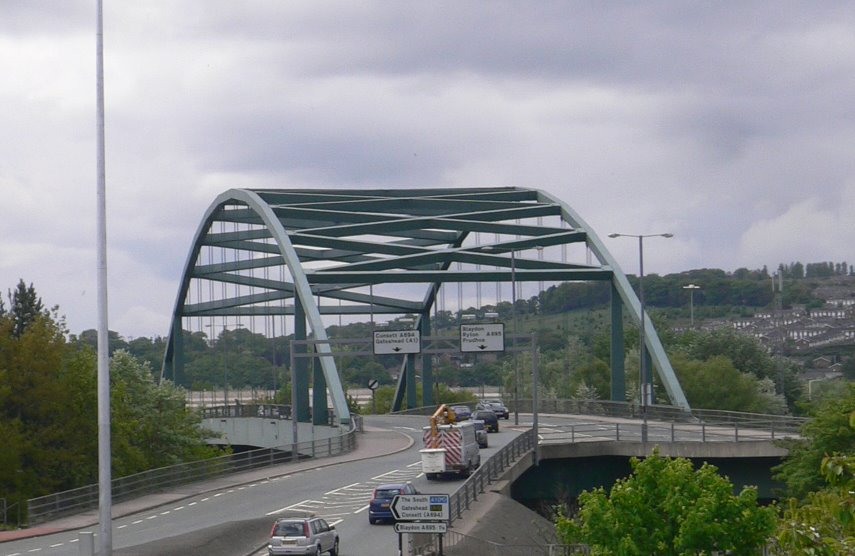
- Scotswood Bridge, in 2008
- Coordinates: 54.9670°N 1.6899°W
- OS grid reference: NZ199636
- Carries: A695; Motor Vehicles; Cycles; Pedestrians
- Crosses: River Tyne
- Locale: Tyneside
- Preceded by: Scotswood Railway Bridge
- Followed by: Redheugh Bridge

Characteristics
- Design: Steel through arch with suspended box girder deck.
- Total length: 138.9 m (456 ft)
- Width: 20.13 m (66.0 ft)
- Longest span: 329 m (1,079 ft)
- No. of spans: 3
- Piers in water: 2
- Clearance above: 7.6 m (25 ft)
- No. of lanes: 4

History
- Architect: Watson & Coates
- Engineering design by: Mott, Hay and Anderson
- Constructed by: Mitchell Construction
- Fabrication by: Dorman Long
- Construction start: 1964
- Construction end: 1967
- Construction cost: £2.5 million
- Opened: 20 March 1967
- Replaces: Scotswood ("Chain") Bridge

Location
- Interactive map of Scotswood Bridge

Scotswood Bridge is one of the main bridges crossing the River Tyne in North East England. It links the west end of Newcastle upon Tyne on the north bank of the river with the MetroCentre and Blaydon in Gateshead on the south bank. It is situated 3.2 mi (5.1 km) upstream of the better-known city centre bridges.

== The Chain Bridge ==
Scotswood Bridge over River Tyne Act 1829
- Act of Parliament
- Parliament of the United Kingdom
- Long title: An Act for building a Bridge over the River Tyne, at or near a Place called Scotswood, in the County of Northumberland, and for making convenient Roads, Avenues, and Approaches thereto, with Branches thereout.
- Citation: 10 Geo. 4. c. x

Dates
- Royal assent: 13 April 1829
Other legislation
Repealed by	Scotswood Bridge Act 1962

Status: Repealed

Text of statute as originally enacted

The first bridge across the river at this location was the Old Scotswood Bridge, or "The Chain Bridge" as it was known locally. It was a suspension bridge with two stone towers, from which the road deck was suspended by chains. An act to authorise the building of the bridge was passed by Parliament, the Scotswood Bridge over River Tyne Act 1829 (10 Geo. 4. c. x) and designed by John Green, with construction beginning that year. It was opened on 16 April 1831.

The toll to cross the bridge was abolished on 18 March 1907. In 1931 the bridge needed to be strengthened and widened. The width was increased from 17 ft (5.2 m) to 19.5 ft (5.9 m) with two 6 ft (1.8 m) footpaths. The suspension cables and decking were also strengthened, allowing the weight limit to be raised to 10 tonnes (9.842 long tons; 11.02 short tons). The bridge eventually proved too narrow for the traffic it needed to carry and its increasing repair costs proved too much. After standing for 136 years, it was closed and demolished in 1967 after its replacement had been completed.

== Current bridge ==
Scotswood Bridge Act 1962
- Act of Parliament
- Parliament of the United Kingdom
- Long title: An Act to empower the county council of the administrative county of Durham and the lord mayor, aldermen and citizens of the city and county of Newcastle upon Tyne to construct a bridge across the river Tyne with approach roads and other works and to purchase lands compulsorily for those and other purposes, to provide for the removal of the existing Scotswood Bridge across the river Tyne; and for other purposes.
- Citation: 10 & 11 Eliz. 2. c. xlviii

Dates
- Royal assent: 1 August 1962
Other legislation
Repeals/revokes	Scotswood Bridge over River Tyne Act 1829; Newcastle-upon-Tyne Corporation (Tolls) Act 1905

Status: Current legislation

Text of statute as originally enacted

A replacement for the Chain Bridge had been proposed as early as 1941. Permission was finally granted in 1960, and authorised by an act of Parliament, the Scotswood Bridge Act 1962 (10 & 11 Eliz. 2. c. xlviii). A new bridge was designed by Mott, Hay and Anderson and built by Mitchell Construction and Dorman Long. Construction commenced on 18 September 1964. It was built 43 m upstream of the Chain Bridge, which continued operating during the new bridge's construction. The bridge was opened on 20 March 1967. It is a box girder bridge, supported by two piers in the river and carries a dual carriageway road. Combined costs for demolition of the old bridge and construction of the new one were £2.5 million.

Scotswood Bridge carried the traffic of the Gateshead A69 western by-pass from 1970 up until the construction of Blaydon Bridge and the new A1 in 1990. Between June 1971 and January 1974 traffic on the bridge was limited to single file to enable strengthening work to take place, which was needed to address design concerns. It has required further strengthening and repairs a number of times since; between 1979 and 1980, in 1983 and in 1990.

Next bridge upstream	River Tyne	Next bridge downstream
Scotswood Railway Bridge; Disused (now carries water and gas mains)	Scotswood Bridge; Grid reference NZ198636	Redheugh Bridge; A189
Next road bridge upstream	River Tyne	Next road bridge downstream
Blaydon Bridge; A1	Scotswood Bridge; Grid reference NZ196638	Redheugh Bridge; A189
