= Scotswood Railway Bridge =

Disued railway bridge over the River Tyne, England

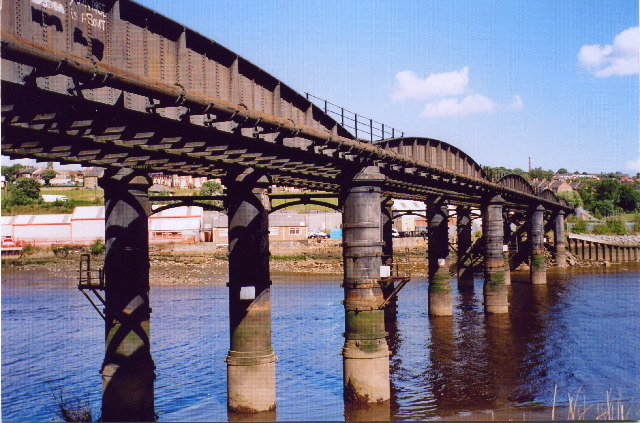
- Scotswood Railway Bridge, on 25 August 2005
- Coordinates: 54.9684°N 1.6935°W
- OS grid reference: NZ196637
- Carries: Water mains; Gas mains; (formerly, Newcastle & Carlisle Railway)
- Crosses: River Tyne
- Locale: Tyneside
- Preceded by: Blaydon Bridge
- Followed by: Scotswood Bridge

Characteristics
- Design: Beam bridge, hog-back girders on cylinder piers
- Material: Wrought iron
- Pier construction: Cast iron
- Total length: 212.6 m (698 ft)
- Width: 7.7 m (25 ft)
- Longest span: 37.9 m (124 ft)
- No. of spans: 6
- Piers in water: 5

Rail characteristics
- No. of tracks: (Formerly) 2
- Track gauge: 1,435 mm (4 ft 8 1/2 in)

History
- Construction end: 1871
- Construction cost: £20,000
- Opened: 1871
- Closed: 4 October 1982

Location
- Interactive map of Scotswood Railway Bridge

Scotswood Railway Bridge is a pipeline bridge and former railway bridge crossing the River Tyne in North East England. It previously carried the Newcastle and Carlisle Railway between Scotswood and Blaydon stations.

The first railway bridge on this site was completed in 1839. Largely built of wood, it burnt down two decades later and was briefly replaced by a pair of bridges until the construction of the present bridge was completed in 1871. It was constructed largely of wrought iron, which was supplied by the local firm Palmers Shipbuilding and Iron Company, and cost roughly £20,000. The bridge has a six-span hog-back configuration and is supported upon five cast iron cylindrical piers; the deck is intentionally skewed across the river to avoid sharp curves that would necessitate reducing the speed of passing trains.

This bridge was in use by railway traffic for over one hundred years without major issue, albeit some strengthening measures being required during 1943. On 4 October 1982, it was permanently taken out of service, with its traffic being redirected across former freight-only lines to the King Edward VII Bridge and through Dunston, allegedly as a cost-saving measure. While unused for its original purpose for decades, the Scotswood Railway Bridge has remained in situ, carrying utilities across the river to the present day. Its railway tracks have been lifted and it is uncrossable to the general public.

== History ==
There have been multiple railway bridges across the River Tyne at this location. The construction of such a bridge was a key element of the original line of the Newcastle & Carlisle Railway, which was largely built during the late 1830s. Prior to the existence of any bridge, there was a temporary terminus built for the railway on the southern bank of the river at nearby Redheugh, Gateshead.

The first Scotswood Railway Bridge, which was designed by the civil engineer John Blackmore and was composed primarily of timber, was completed in 1839 and opened to traffic that same year. However, this stood for only two decades before it was accidentally destroyed by a fire, which was allegedly caused by hot ash deposited by a passing steam locomotive. During 1860, the second bridge, which was rapidly built as a replacement for the first, was opened; five years later, another temporary single-track bridge was constructed on the site while a more comprehensive structure was planned and built alongside, which would become the fourth railway bridge.

Unlike its predecessors, the fourth bridge was largely composed of wrought iron, which was supplied by Palmers Shipbuilding and Iron Company from their nearby shipyard in Jarrow, South Tyneside. In terms of its configuration, it was a six-span hog-back bridge, supported upon five cast iron cylindrical piers. It was set at an angle to the river, thus avoiding any sharp curves for railway traffic to traverse, thus enabling trains to approach the bridge at considerable speeds. It reportedly cost roughly £20,000 to construct. During 1871, the fourth bridge was opened to traffic in 1871.

A relatively complex series of railway junctions developed around the bridge, consisting of the main line to Carlisle that ran north of the river as far as Scotswood and a branch line that continued on the north bank of the Tyne to North Wylam via Newburn, where it rejoined the main line. During 1943, the Scotswood Railway Bridge was subject to a series of strengthening works.

On 4 October 1982, the bridge was permanently taken out of use for all railway traffic; instead, the trains on the Tyne Valley Line that had previously used the crossing were re-routed across the King Edward VII Bridge and through Dunston. This redirection of traffic, which required the upgrading of a former freight-only line to handle passenger traffic as well, had been allegedly motivated by the high cost of repairs due to both the bridge and to track immediately to its north, which could be avoided by its closure.

Although it was no longer used to carry railway traffic, the bridge remained in situ, partially as it carries utilities across the river, both water and gas mains. By the twenty-first century, the railway tracks across the structure had been removed. National Cycle Route 141 passes underneath the Scotswood Railway Bridge along the north bank of the river.

Next bridge upstream	River Tyne	Next bridge downstream
Blaydon Bridge; A1	Scotswood Railway Bridge; Grid reference NZ196637	Scotswood Bridge; A695
Next railway bridge upstream	River Tyne	Next railway bridge downstream
Wylam Railway Bridge; Formerly North Tyne loop, now National Cycle Route 72	Scotswood Railway Bridge; Grid reference NZ196637	King Edward VII Bridge; East Coast Main Line
