= Alexander Lindsay of Barnweill =

13th-century noble

- Arms of Alexander Lindsay: Gules, a fess chequy argent and azure.
- Died: 1308
- Noble family: Lindsay family
- Father: David Lindsay
- Mother: Margaret de Lindsay

Sir Alexander Lindsay (died 1308), Lord of Barnweill, Byres and Crawford, also known as Alexander de Lindsay, was a Scottish noble.

Alexander was the eldest son of Sir David Lindsay of Barnweill and Margaret de Lindsay. He swore fealty and homage to King Edward I of England on 28 July 1296 at Berwick.

On 9 July 1297, Alexander, together with Sir James Stewart, High Steward of Scotland, Sir John Stewart of Bonkyll, Sir Robert de Brus, jure uxoris Earl of Carrick and Robert Wishart, Bishop of Glasgow capitulated at Irvine. He was on the English side in the Bishop of Durham Antony Bek's division during the Battle of Falkirk on 22 July 1298 that defeated the Scottish army. For his services, he was granted the former Lindsay lands of Crawford that had been passed by marriage to the Pinkeneys.

He was ordered in September 1305 to leave Scotland for six months for his participation in the uprising of Sir William Wallace and Sir Andrew Moray. He was also a supporter of Robert de Brus. Alexander was captured at the fall of Kildrummy Castle on 13 September 1306. He was taken to England and held prisoner. Alexander was one of the leaders of the Scottish army that campaigned in Galloway in 1308. He was lastly summoned to the Scottish parliament in 1309, however apparently had died in 1308.

== Family ==
Alexander married Beatrix Alice Stewart a daughter of Alexander Stewart, High Steward of Scotland. He is known to have had the following issue:

- David Lindsay of Crawford, married Maria de Abernethy, had issue.
- Alexander Lindsay of Ormistoun
- Reginald Lindsay
- William Lindsay, canon of Glasgow
- Beatrice Lindsay, married firstly Archibald Douglas, and secondly, Robert Erskine of that Ilk (Beatrice's Half Brother), had issue from both marriages.
