= Gilbert de Umfraville (died 1245) =

English knight, died 1245

- Died: 1245
- Spouses: Theophania de Balliol; Matilda, Countess of Angus
- Issue: Gilbert de Umfraville, Earl of Angus
- Father: Richard de Umfraville, Lord of Redesdale

Gilbert de Umfraville (died 1245) was a 13th-century English baron. Gilbert was the eldest son of Richard de Umfraville, Lord of Redesdale. He succeeded his father as Lord of Redesdale and Baron Prudhoe from November 1226 at his seat of Prudhoe Castle. He also had lands at Otterburn.

== Life ==
In November 1226, Gilbert de Umfraville succeeded his father Richard de Umbraville as Lord of Redesdale and Baron Prudhoe following the latter's death.

In 1228, he was summoned by Henry III to help with the Welsh 'Kerry' campaign. He and other barons were ordered to muster at Shrewsbury in preparation for aiding the English garrison at Montgomery Castle in Wales after they were attacked by forces led by Llywelyn ab Iorwerth.

=== Marriage and issue ===
- He married firstly Theophania de Balliol, daughter of Eustace de Balliol and Agnes de Percy.
- He married secondly Matilda of Angus, daughter of Máel Coluim, Earl of Angus and Mary de Berkeley and had issue:
1. Gilbert, married Elizabeth Comyn, daughter of Alexander Comyn, Earl of Buchan, had issue; died in 1308.

== See also ==
- Umfraville

== Sources ==
- Burke, Sir Bernard, A Genealogical History of the Extinct Peerages of the British Empire (London 1883)
- Paul, Sir James Balfour, The Scots Peerage, (Edinburgh, 1904), vol. i, Angus.
