= Gilbert de Umfraville, Earl of Angus =

Coat of arms as the Earl of Angus

Gilbert de Umfraville, Earl of Angus also known as The Red Earl (before 1246 – 1308) was the first of the Anglo-French de Umfraville line to rule the Earldom of Angus in his own right.

His father was Gilbert de Umfraville (died shortly before 13 March 1245), a Norman, and feudal baron of Prudhoe in Northumberland, and his mother was Matilda, Countess of Angus. He succeeded his father in infancy.

He also carried on the line of the earlier Gaelic earls through his mother. He succeeded her sometime after 1247 (when she was still living with her third husband Richard de Dover) as an infant, certainly no older than three.

Simon de Montfort, 6th Earl of Leicester, paid £10,000 to act as Gilbert's warden. Gilbert eventually grew into his inheritance, and although he was primarily an English magnate, there are still a few of his recorded grants. Gilbert was the nominal ruler of the province for more than half a century.

In 1267, he had a dispute with William of Douglas, who held the manor of Fawdon in England. He and his men attacked the manor, which was burned in the attack, took Douglas prisoner, seriously injured Douglas's son and heir William le Hardi, Lord of Douglas who was defending his father, and seized a substantial sum of coin in addition to household goods. As Earl of Angus he was summoned in 1276 for a campaign in Gwynedd against Llywelyn ap Gruffudd. In 1284 he attended the parliament with other Scottish noblemen who acknowledged Margaret of Norway as the heir to King Alexander. In 1296 he again joined Edward I in his conquest of Scotland. He also founded a chantry for two priests at Prudhoe castle to celebrate mass daily.

He died in 1308, and was succeeded by his second son, Robert de Umfraville, Earl of Angus. His first son Gilbert de Umfraville married Margaret de Clare (later Margaret de Badlesmere, Baroness Badlesmere) as her first husband.

Gilbert was buried in Hexham Abbey. His effigy survives and can be seen.

== See also ==
- Umfraville

== Sources ==
- Bain, Joseph (ed.) Calendar of documents relating to Scotland
- Burke, Sir Bernard, A Genealogical History of the Extinct Peerages of the British Empire (London 1883)
- Paul, Sir James Balfour, The Scots Peerage (Edinburgh, 1904), vol. i, Angus.
- Richardson, Douglas, Plantagenet Ancestry, Baltimore, 2004, p. 49, ISBN 0-8063-1750-7
- Rymer, Thomas, Foedera Conventiones, &c. London. 1745

== Bibliography ==
- Tout, Thomas Frederick (1899). "Umfraville, Gilbert de (1244?-1307)" . In Lee, Sidney (ed.). Dictionary of National Biography. Vol. 58. London: Smith, Elder & Co. pp. 21–24.

Preceded by Matilda; m. Gilbert de Umfraville	Earl of Angus; 1246–1308	Succeeded by Robert de Umfraville
