= Andrew de Leslie =

Scottish knight

Andrew de Leslie Lord of Leslie
- Died: c. 1324
- Children: Norman; Walter; George
- Parent: Norman de Leslie
- Family: Clan Leslie

Sir Andrew de Leslie, Lord of Leslie was a 13th-14th century Scottish noble. He was a signatory of the Declaration of Arbroath in 1320. He died c. 1324.

Andrew was the son of Sir Norman de Leslie. He obtained via his wife's dower the baronies of Rothes and Ballinbreich. In 1305, Andrew was ordered by King Edward I of England, after rebelling with William Wallace to stay out of Scotland for six months. He gained charters for his service from King Robert I of Scotland and signed the Declaration of Arbroath in 1320. Andrew died before 1324, as his wife obtained papal dispensation in 1324 to marry Sir David Lindsay of Crawford.

== Family and issue ==
Andrew de Leslie married Mary Abernethy, daughter of Alexander de Abernethy (d. 1312) and Margaret de Menteith and had the following known issue.

- Andrew (died c. 1352), had issue.
- Norman (died c. 1366), married Margaret de Lamberton.
- Walter, married Euphemia de Ross and became jure uxoris Earl of Ross.
- George of Bulquhain (d. 1351), married Elizabeth Keith, had issue.
- unknown ancestor of Earl of Rothes.

== Citations ==
Preceded by Norman de Leslie	Lord Leslie c.1320 - c. 1324	Succeeded by Andrew de Leslie
