= David de Lindsay of the Byres =

13th-century Scottish noble

Arms of Lindsay of Barnweill

David de Lindsay, Lord of Barnweill and Byres (died 1270), was a Scottish knight and crusader. A minor baronial lord, he was the son of Sir David de Lindsay and held lands in East Lothian and South Ayrshire. He became Justiciar of Lothian under Alexander II of Scotland in 1241. This position had been held by his father earlier in the century.

He rose to further national prominence as a supporter of the Comyns during the minority of Alexander III of Scotland, becoming a regent in 1255 and royal Lord Chamberlain of Scotland in 1255 serving until 1257.

He went on the Ninth Crusade with Louis IX of France in 1268, and died in Tunis, c. 1270.

== Family ==
David married Margaret Lindsay, possibly of the Lamberton Lindsay family, or more likely Margaret Stewart, daughter of Alexander Stewart, the 4th High Steward of Scotland, they are known to have had the following known issue:

- Sir Alexander Lindsay of Barnweill (died 1308), had issue.
- Sir William Lindsay of Symington, married Alice Lockhart, no issue.
