= Barntalloch Castle =

Former Scottish castle

Coordinates: 55.1800°N 3.0181°W

Barntalloch Castle was a castle located at Staplegorton, in Dumfries and Galloway, Scotland.

The castle was built in the 12th century by Galfrid de Coninsburgh and later was a stronghold of the Lindsay family. It was the caput of the Barony of Staplegorton.
