= Gille Brigte, Earl of Angus =

Gille Brigte of Angus is one of the earliest attested Mormaers of Angus. He was possibly a descendant of Dubacan of Angus.

Gille Brigte is recorded as a witness to a charter dating to 1150. He probably fathered both Adam and Gille Críst. He was dead by 1189, when his son Adam was the Mormaer.

== Bibliography ==
- Roberts, John L., Lost Kingdoms: Celtic Scotland in the Middle Ages, (Edinburgh, 1997), pp. 53–4

Preceded by ?	Mormaer of Angus fl. 1150	Succeeded by Adam
