= Umfraville =

English-French aristocratic family

Umfraville Family

Profile
- Region: Lowlands, Northumberland

Chief
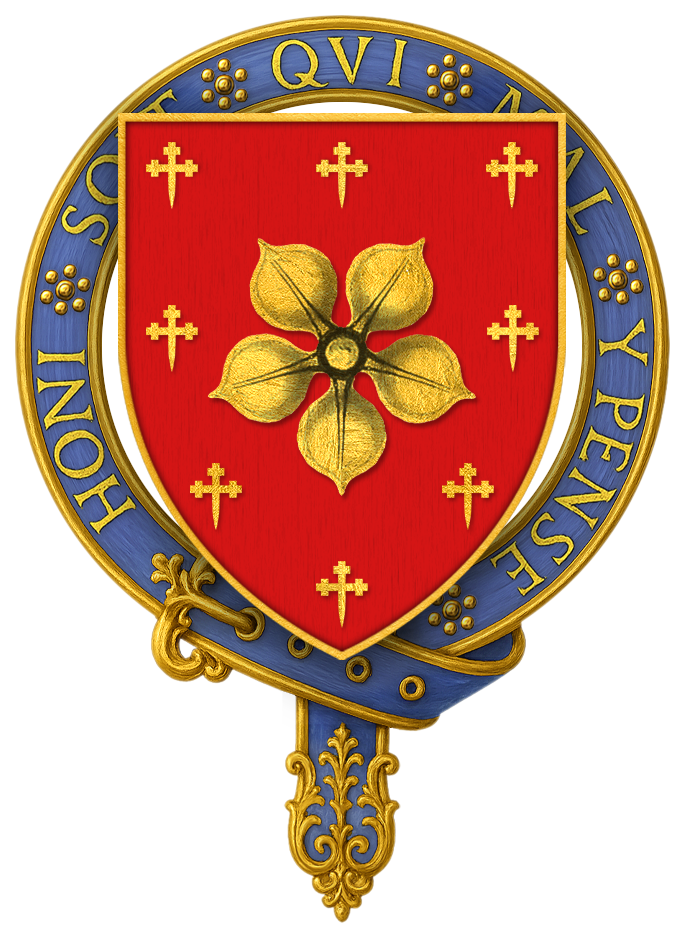
- Robert de Umfraville
- The Lord of Redesdale, Earl of Angus, Feudal Baron of Prudhoe
- Seat: Harbottle Castle, Prudhoe Castle
- Historic seat: Northumberland

The Umfraville family were Anglo-Norman landowners, administrators and soldiers who were prominent from about 1120 to 1437 on the northern border of England, where they held the strategic lordships of Prudhoe and Redesdale in Northumberland. They held, for the English Crown, Tynedale to the Cumbrian Border up to the border with Scotland.

It was in Scotland where the Umfravilles reached the pinnacle of their power. As a prominent border landowning family, it is likely that they were invited, along with dozens of other Anglo-Norman knights, administrators, and warlords to settle in Scotland by David I of Scotland as part of his policy of modernising Scotland by introducing feudalism, now known as the Davidian Revolution by historians. The Umfravilles, who were granted lands in Stirlingshire, were by the third generation established as members of Court and for three generations became Mormaer of Angus through marriage into the Scots-Gaelic aristocracy.

The split loyalties between the Kings of Scotland and the Kings of England meant the family frequently found itself as unsettled as the border and this came to a head during the Wars of Scottish Independence where they fought for both Scotland and England at various points of the conflict (as did the de Brus family).

== Origin ==
Perhaps coming from the French village of Offranville (Ulfranville 1087–88; Apud Wlfranvillam ab. 1130; Ulfranvilla before 1164; W. de Hunffranvilla before 1164; Apud Unfranvillam 1155; Wulfranvilla 1177; Apud Unfranvillam 1178; Wlfranvilla 1202; Apud Vulfranvillam 1188–89; O. de Umfranvile [var. Unfrenivile et Unfrenvile]; O. de Humfravile end 12th century) in Normandy. Another hypothesis links the name with one or the other Amfrevilles in Normandy such as Amfreville-la-Mi-Voie near Rouen mentioned variously in the Middle Ages as Onfreville (1217); Offravilla (1282); Onfreville (1291); Onffreville (1319); Onfrevilla (1337); Onffreville-la-mi-voie (1395); Saint Rémy d'Unfreville la mivoie (2-6-1466) or Amfréville (Calvados) cited as Unfarvilla (1277) and Onfreville (1371). According to Mark Antony Lower, the founder of the family in England was Robert de Umfraville, called Robert "with the Beard" (cum Barba), who came into England with William the Conqueror. There is a possible connection with another Umfraville family in Glamorgan. Traditions of their origins and early exploits appearing in past writers are fanciful.

== Principal members ==
=== Robert I (died in or after 1145) ===
The first historical member of the family, he held the lordships of Prudhoe and Redesdale for King Henry I in England and also acquired interests in Scotland. Associated there with King David I and his son Henry, lands in Stirlingshire held by his descendants were probably granted then. He is taken to be the father of Odinel I and Gilbert I.

=== Odinel I (died in or after 1166) ===
Succeeding his father Robert I in England, he was also active in Scotland, being associated there with King David I and his grandson King Malcolm IV. He left no children.

=== Gilbert I (died in or after 1175) ===
Succeeding his brother Odinel I after 1166, he had made his career mostly in Scotland, and was presumably the father of Odinel II.

=== Odinel II (died 1182) ===
Succeeding his presumed father Gilbert I after 1175, he had been raised in Scotland, initially serving in the household of King William I. He married Alice, daughter of the justiciar Richard Lucy, and had four or five sons, including Robert II and Richard, and at least three daughters, one being Alice who married William Bertram of Mitford. At his death in 1182 his estates in Northumberland alone were valued at nearly £60 a year and other English lands in Yorkshire, Suffolk, and Rutland may have doubled that, making him a wealthy magnate.

=== Robert II (died in or before 1195) ===
Succeeding his father Odinel II in 1182, he left no children.

=== Richard (died 1226) ===
Succeeding his brother Robert II around 1195, he was among the northern barons who resisted the exactions of King John and came under suspicion of treachery, being required in 1212 to hand over to the king his sons and his castle of Prudhoe. By 1216 he joined the rebels fighting John and his lands were forfeit, though he later made peace with the government of King Henry III. With a wife whose name is unknown he had at least four sons, including Gilbert II, and two daughters.

=== Gilbert II, Earl of Angus (died 1245) ===
Succeeding his father Richard in 1226, his first wife was Tiffany, a member of the Balliol family. After she died, in 1243 he married Maud, widow of John Comyn and daughter of Malcolm, Earl of Angus, who was the mother of his only son, Gilbert III. He is usually called Earl of Angus in right of his wife, who remarried after his death.

=== Gilbert III Earl of Angus (died 1307 or 1308) ===
Succeeding his father Gilbert II in 1245 while still an infant, he married Elizabeth, daughter of Alexander Comyn, Earl of Buchan and their second son was Robert III. His effigy can be seen in Hexham Abbey

=== Robert III Earl of Angus (died 1325) ===
Succeeding his father Gilbert III in 1307, he married first Lucy, daughter of Sir Philip Kyme, and secondly Eleanor, daughter of Robert Lumley. With his first wife he had a son Gilbert IV and with his second wife a son Thomas I.

=== Gilbert IV (died 1381) ===
Succeeding his father Robert III in 1325, he married first Joan, daughter of Sir Robert Willoughby, and secondly Maud, daughter of Sir Thomas Lucy. With Joan he had a son Robert, who died before him.

=== Thomas I (died 1387) ===
Succeeding his half-brother Gilbert IV in 1381, he married Joan, daughter of Adam Roddam, and had two sons Thomas II and Robert IV.

=== Thomas II (died 1391) ===
Succeeding his father Thomas I in 1387, he married Agnes (died 1420), daughter of Sir Thomas Grey and his wife Margaret Pressene, and had a son Gilbert V. A daughter Maud married Sir William Ryther, of Ryther. He died on 12 February 1391.

=== Gilbert V (died 1421) ===
Succeeding his father Thomas II in 1391, in 1413 he married Anne, daughter of Ralph Nevill, 1st Earl of Westmorland, and his wife Margaret, daughter of Hugh Stafford, 2nd Earl of Stafford. They had no children, and he died fighting the French at Baugé in 1421.

=== Robert IV (died 1437) ===
Succeeding his nephew Gilbert V in 1421, his wife was named Isabel and they had no children. He was the last of the family and his lands passed to Sir William Tailboys, a remote cousin.

== Arms ==
In 1245 the Umfraville arms were recorded as: gules, a cinquefoil pierced or in a bordure azure, the bordure being sometimes shown charged with horseshoes. Horse breeding was a major activity of the family in England.
