= David Lindsay of Crawford =

Scottish nobleman, died in or before 1357

Coat of arms of Lindsay of Crawford

Sir David Lindsay of Crawford (died 1355) was a Scottish noble.

David was the son of Alexander Lindsay of Barnweill. For his fathers services in the service of Edward I of England at the Battle of Falkirk, he was granted the former Lindsay lands of Crawford that had been passed by marriage to the Pinkeneys. Crawford was inherited by David.

He signed the Declaration of Arbroath in 1320. David fought at the Battle of Halidon Hill against the English on 19 July 1333. He was the keeper of Edinburgh Castle in 1346. He held the office of Scottish Ambassador to England in 1349. He also held the office of Custodian of Berwick Castle and was the Scottish Ambassador to England in 1351. David died in 1355.

== Family and issue ==
David married Maria de Abernethy, daughter of Alexander de Abernethy and Margaret de Menteith in 1325 and had the following known issue:

- David Lindsay, Master of Crawford (died 1346), without issue.
- James Lindsay of Crawford
- Alexander Lindsay of Glenesk
- William Lindsay of the Byres
