= Cuncar of Angus =

Cuncar of Angus was Mormaer of Angus somewhere in the mid- or late-10th century, which makes it quite possible that he was the successor of Dubacan. One divergent source calls him thanus (i.e. taoiseach), but otherwise he is comes (i.e. Mormaer). The tradition called by Anderson the Chronicle of the Kings of Scotland records in several manuscripts that Cuncar's daughter Lady Finella was responsible for the death of king Cináed II, because the aforementioned King of Scots had put her son to death. Otherwise, Cuncar is obscure. Even the name "Cuncar" is obscure, and may not be authentic, representing either the Gaelic name Conchobar or the Brythonic name Cincar. John of Fordun calls him Cruchne, which is clearly equivalent to Cruithne, as in Fordun's period, owing to French influence, cs often replace ts. Cruithne was the Gaelic word for a Pict, but why Fordun gives Cuncar this name is even more obscure than Cuncar himself.

== Bibliography ==
- Anderson, Alan Orr, Early Sources of Scottish History: AD 500-1286, 2 Vols, (Edinburgh, 1922), v.i, pp. 512–14

| Preceded by ?Dubacan | Mormaer of Angus fl. mid-900s | Succeeded by ? |
