= Matilda, Countess of Angus =

13th-century Scottish noble

Matilda of Angus, also known as Maud, was the daughter of Maol Choluim, Earl or Mormaer of Angus and, as his heiress, was countess of the province in her own right.

== Marriages and issue ==
She married John Comyn, but he died in France in 1242. They do not appear to have had issue.

A husband was needed to control the dispersed earldom; she then married Gilbert de Umfraville, a Norman, who was feudal baron of Prudhoe in Northumberland. He died shortly before 13 March 1245, but not before Matilda had borne him a son named Gilbert to succeed to the earldom in his infancy:

- Gilbert, married Elizabeth Comyn, daughter of Alexander Comyn, Earl of Buchan, had issue. He died in 1308.

Matilda married again before 22 December 1247, Richard de Dover, the feudal baron of Chilham, Kent, the son of Richard FitzRoy (an illegitimate son of King John of England and his mistress Adela de Warenne). Matilda disappears from records after producing two children:

- Richard of Chilham, Lord of Chilham. He died before 10 January 1266.
- Isabel, married David I Strathbogie, Earl of Atholl, son of John de Strathbogie and Ada, Countess of Atholl, had issue.

| Preceded by Maol Choluim | Countess of Angus; 1240–1246x | Succeeded by Gilbert de Umfraville |
