= Adam, Earl of Angus =

Earl of Angus c. 1141 – 1198

Adam (perhaps representing the name Áedán), ruled from sometime prior to 1189 as Mormaer of Angus. Almost nothing is known of him, but it is fairly certain that he was the son of Gille Brigte, the previous Mormaer. He died young and was succeeded (if they did not rule jointly) by his younger brother Gille Críst.

== Bibliography ==
- Roberts, John L., Lost Kingdoms: Celtic Scotland in the Middle Ages, (Edinburgh, 1997), pp. 53–4

Preceded by Gille Brigte	Mormaer of Angus fl. 1189	Succeeded by Gille Críst
