= Lady Finella =

Scottish assassin

- The meeting of Kenneth and Fenella by Charles Dudley Tennant
- Born: c. 950
- Died: 995
- Cause of death: Leapt to her death over a waterfall
- Known for: Assassinating Kenneth II of Scotland
- Father: Cuncar of Angus

Lady Finella (c. 950 – 995) was a noblewoman and Scottish assassin who killed King Kenneth II out of revenge. Her story is based on chronicles from the 14th century.

== Early life ==
Lady Finella was the daughter of Cuncar, Mormaer of Angus, who was thought to be a descendant of Pictish royalty. She was raised in Kincardine Castle. Lady Finella is a well-known name that is rarely spelled the same way, and is also referred to as Fenella, Finuela, Finnguala, and Fembal, depending on the source.

== Assassination of King Kenneth ==
Most of her story is known through John of Fordun's chronicles written in the late 14th century, probably based on local, medieval folklore or 'feud-sagas'. John of Fordun documented that Lady Finella's son was killed, most likely in battle, by Kenneth II of Scotland, king of Alba. Other sources say that Lady Finella's son was executed for theft after not following the king's orders.

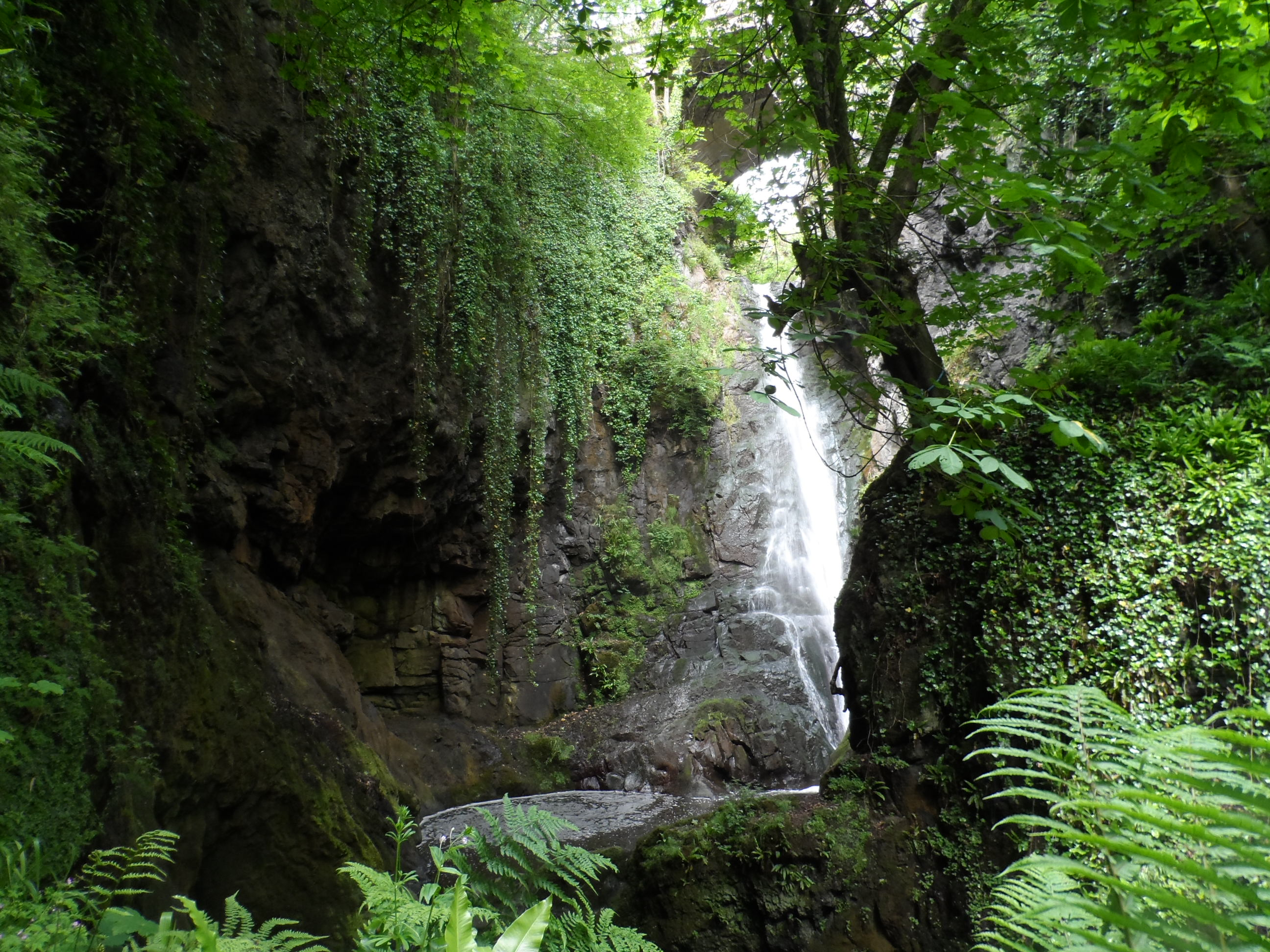
Den Finella waterfall, where Finella fell to her death

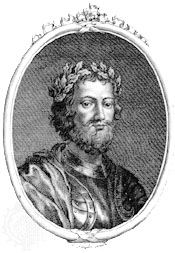
King Kenneth II of Scotland

In order to seek revenge, Lady Finella created an elaborate death-trap at a cottage in Fettercairn then lured King Kenneth II inside when he was visiting the area. She likely had help from the king's men or Cinaed's rivals. Inside, a statue of a boy stood in the centre of the main room. Lady Finella said that if the king touched the boy's head it would lead to 'amazing sport'. When King Kenneth II pulled the statue's head towards him it triggered a series of crossbows throughout the space that sent a hail of arrows into the king. Though the story's truth is uncertain, it is known definitively that Kenneth II was killed in Fettercairn in 995.

It is not certain that Lady Finella acted solely out of revenge. She was possibly enlisted by traditional factions opposed to the king's rule. For instance, King Kenneth wanted to have stronger control over the residents of Alba. He also attempted to establish a feudal rule of primogeniture, the right of estates going to the first-born son, angering some nobles.

After the assassination, Lady Finella fled towards the coast where she was pursued and cornered by the king's soldiers at the top of a waterfall near St Cyrus. To avoid capture, Lady Finella threw herself over the waterfall from a height of 150 feet to her death. Today, the valley where these events supposedly took place is called Den Finella.
