= John Stewart, 1st Earl of Angus =

Scottish nobleman

Arms of John Stewart, 1st Earl of Angus: Gold, a fess chequy blue mid silver, surmounted by a red bend charged with three gold buckles.

John Stewart, 1st Earl of Angus, Lord of Bonkyl, jure uxoris Lord of Abernethy (died 9 December 1331) was a medieval Scottish nobleman.

Stewart was the son of Sir Alexander Stewart of Bonkyll, great-grandson of Alexander Stewart, 4th High Steward of Scotland, and Jean Fitz James, daughter of Alexander Fitz James. Sir Alexander died around 1319, and Stewart inherited his father's estates in Berwickshire, centered upon the barony of Bonkyll and Preston.

In 1328, he married Margaret de Abernethy, heiress to the Lordship of Abernethy. Her father Sir Alexander de Abernethy was the last of the Gaelic lords of Abernethy, descendants of Gille Míchéil, Earl of Fife. Stewart assumed his wife's titles, and was further ennobled by Robert I of Scotland in 1329, being created Earl of Angus. The Earldom of Angus had been forfeited by the previous holder, Robert de Umfreville, before 1314, for choosing the losing side during the Wars of Scottish Independence, although he continued to style himself Earl until his death in 1325.

Stewart was knighted on 24 November 1331 on the coronation of King David II, but died just two weeks later. He was succeeded by his and Margaret's son Thomas Stewart, 2nd Earl of Angus.

It is through Thomas Stewart's daughter and John Stewart's granddaughter, Margaret, and her illicit relationship with William Douglas, 1st Earl of Douglas, that the Earldom of Angus, Lordship of Abernethy, and the comitatus associated with it passed on to the Douglases in the person of George Douglas (the first Red Douglas). This close connection of the Douglas Earls of Angus with the House of Stewart was to have large implications for the latter's future struggles with the Black Douglases.

== See also ==
- Bonkyl Kirk

Peerage of Scotland
New creation	Earl of Angus; 1329–1331	Succeeded by Thomas Stewart
Preceded by Alexander de Abernethy	Lord of Abernethy jure uxoris 1328–1331	Succeeded by Thomas Stewart
