= Donnchadh, Earl of Angus =

Mormaer of Angus (r. 1206–1214)

Donnchadh of Angus ruled from 1206 until 1214 as Mormaer of Angus. Little is known about his life, but he seems to have been dead by 1214.

== Bibliography ==
- Roberts, John L., Lost Kingdoms: Celtic Scotland in the Middle Ages (Edinburgh, 1997), pp. 53–4

Preceded by Gille Críst	Mormaer of Angus; 1206–1214	Succeeded by Máel Coluim
