= John Comyn (died 1242) =

Earl of Angus and Earl of Buchan

John Comyn Earl of Angus jure uxoris
- Died: 1242; France
- Spouse: Matilda, Countess of Angus
- Parent: William Comyn, Lord of Badenoch Sarah Fitzhugh

John Comyn, Earl of Angus jure uxoris, was a son of William Comyn, Lord of Badenoch later the Earl of Buchan and became the Earl of Angus, jure uxoris of his wife Matilda, heiress of Máel Coluim, Earl of Angus. He died in 1242.

== Life ==
John was a son of William Comyn, Lord of Badenoch and his first wife Sarah Fitzhugh. Comyn became the Earl of Angus, jure uxoris of his wife Matilda, heiress of Máel Coluim, Earl of Angus. He died in 1242, in France, during King Henry III of England's expedition to Poitou. John died without issue.
