= Clan Lindsay =

Lowland Scottish clan

- Crest: Issuing from an antique ducal coronet the head neck and wings of a Swan proper.
- Motto: Endure Fort (Endure bravely)

Profile
- Region: Lowlands
- District: Angus
- Plant badge: Lime Tree

Chief
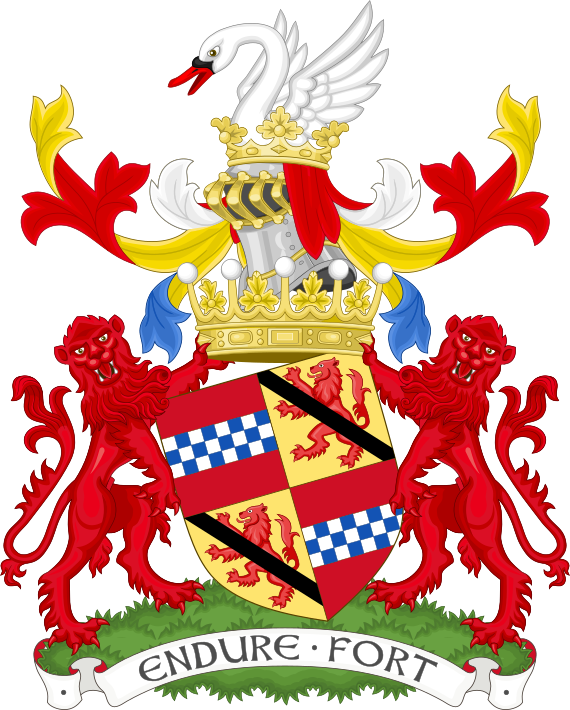
- Anthony Lindsay
- 30th Earl of Crawford and 13th Earl of Balcarres
- Seat: Balcarres House
- Historic seat: Crawford Castle; Edzell Castle
Septs of Clan Lindsay
Auchinleck, Buyers, Byers, Cobb, Deuchar, Deuchars, Downie, Fotheringham, Grubb, Leeds, Rhind, Rhynd, Summers, Sumner, Waddell
Clan branches
Lindsays of Crawford (chiefs)
Lindsays of Balcarres
Lindsays of Edzell
Lindsays of Dowhill
Lindsays of The Byres
Allied clans
Clan Stewart
Clan Wallace
Rival clans
Clan Gordon
Clan Ogilvy

Clan Lindsay is a Scottish clan of the Scottish Lowlands.

== History ==
Lindsay tartan

=== Origins of the clan ===
The Lindsays were prominent in both England and Scotland from the late 11th century. The surname derives from the region of Lindsey in England (the name of which comes from the Old English for "island of Lincoln"), from where the family originated.

In Domesday Book, Baldric de Lindsey of Hemingby is recorded as holding a number of estates in Lindsey in 1086. Baldric's sons, Sir Walter and William de Lindsay accompanied David of Scotland, Earl of Huntingdon, to claim his throne. William's son, William de Lindsay, sat in the Parliament of 1164 and was later a justiciar. William Lindsay held the lands of Crawford and Luffness. The chief's premier title was later Earl of Crawford. His son, Sir William Lindsay, who sat in Parliament as Baron of Luffness in East Lothian, married Alice de Limesi, and from their younger son Sir William Lindsay, dapifer to the High Steward of Scotland, descends the Earl of Crawford.

Sir William Lindsay's elder son was Sir David Lindsay who married a member of the royal family named Margerie. David died in 1214 and was succeeded as Lord Crawford and High Justiciar of Lothian by his son who was also called David. This David also inherited the estates of Limesi and Wolveray. One of his cousins was another Sir David Lindsay who was Chamberlain of Scotland in 1256.

=== Wars of Scottish Independence ===
The aforementioned David Lindsay's grandson was yet another David whose seal was appended to the letter of 1320 to the Pope, asserting the independence of Scotland, that was more often known as the Declaration of Arbroath. His second son, Sir James Lindsay, married Egidia, daughter of Walter Stewart, 6th High Steward of Scotland, and Marjory Bruce, daughter of Robert The Bruce and Isabella de Mar, and half-sister of David II of Scotland, son of Robert the Bruce and his second wife, Elizabeth de Burgh.

=== 14th, 15th and 16th centuries ===
In 1390, Sir David Lindsay famously took part in a tournament at London Bridge, in the presence of Richard II of England. At the tournament Lindsay won the day and the admiration of the English king. Lindsay was created Earl of Crawford on 21 April 1398. In 1403, he was Lord High Admiral of Scotland and in 1406, he was sent as an ambassador to England.

The Lindsays fought at the Battle of Arbroath in 1445. In 1452, Alexander Lindsay, 4th Earl of Crawford, joined in a rebellion against James II of Scotland and fought at the Battle of Brechin where the royal forces were victorious. Alexander Lindsay was attained for treason but was later pardoned.

The fifth Earl of Crawford rose high in royal favour. He was successively Lord High Admiral of Scotland, Master of the Royal Household, Lord Chamberlain and High Justiciary. In 1488 he was created Duke of Montrose by King James III, but this was annulled after the king's death. The sixth Earl of Crawford was killed at the Battle of Flodden in 1513, while on close attendance to King James IV.

=== 17th century and civil war ===
Ludovic Lindsay, 16th Earl of Crawford, learned his trade as a soldier on the Continent. He later fought for King Charles I during the civil war where he commanded a cavalry regiment at the Battle of Marston Moor. He was later captured supporting James, Marquis of Montrose, at the Battle of Philiphaugh in 1645. The earldom of Crawford was succeeded to by his kinsman John Lindsay, Earl of Lindsay. The Crawford title remained with this branch of the family until it passed to the Earl of Balcarres in the 19th century, who were descended from a younger son of the ninth Earl of Crawford. This branch of the family had been created Earls of Balcarres in 1650 for services during the civil war.

=== 18th century and Jacobite risings ===
The first Earl of Balcarres was made hereditary governor of Edinburgh Castle. He was also made Secretary of State for Scotland and High Commissioner to the General Assembly. His younger son was Colin Lindsay, 3rd Earl of Balcarres, who was a staunch Jacobite and fought during the Jacobite rising of 1715. He only escaped being attained for treason through the intervention of the Duke of Marlborough who was a lifelong friend of his. In 1739, John Lindsay, 20th Earl of Crawford, was made Lieutenant-Colonel of the newly formed 43rd Regiment of Foot ("Black Watch" regiment) that supported the British Government during the Jacobite rising of 1745 and had been formed from the ten Independent Highland Companies of "Black Watch".

== Gallery of arms ==
Traditional Lindsay arms

Lindsay, Earls of Crawford

Lindsay, Duke of Montrose

Lindsay, Earls of Balcarres (1624)

Lindsay, Earls of Balcarres (1670)

Lindsay of Balcarres

Lindsay of Balgawies

Lindsay of Barnyards

Lindsay of Blacksolme

Lindsay of Bonhill

Lindsay of Broadland

Lindsay of the Byres

Lindsay of Cavill

Lindsay of Covington

Lindsay of Crossbasket

Lindsay of Culsh

Lindsay of Dowhill

Lindsay of Dunrod

Lindsay of Eaglescairnie

Lindsay of Edzell

Lindsay of Evelick

Lindsay of Garnock

Lindsay of Kilspindie

Lindsay of Linbank

Lindsay of Loughry

Lindsay of Menmuir

Lindsay of the Mount

Lindsay of Pitscandlie

Lindsay of Pitscarlies and Cairn

Lindsay of Pyotstone

Lindsay of Rossie

Lindsay of Spynie

Lindsay of Staplegorton

Lindsay of Virginia

Lindsay of Wauchopedale

Lindsay of Wormestone

Ancestral arms of Alice de Limési

== Clan castles ==
- Balcarres House is the current seat of the Chief. It was built by John Lindsay of Balcarres in 1595.
- Edzell Castle was the original castle of the Chief of Clan Lindsay which they acquired in 1357 and retained ownership until 1715.
- Crawford Castle, to the north of the village of Crawford, South Lanarkshire, was from where the Earldom of Crawford was created and it was also known as Lindsay Tower.
- Luffness Castle, East Lothian.
- Lamberton Castle, Scottish Borders
- Wauchope Castle, Dumfries and Galloway.
- Carsluith Castle.
- Spynie Palace.
- Lordscairnie Castle.
- Byres Castle, East Lothian.
- Garleton Castle, East Lothian.
- Barnweill Castle, South Ayrshire.
- Craigie Castle, South Ayrshire.
- Lindsane
- Dunrod Castle, Inverkip.

== See also ==
- Earl of Crawford
- Earl of Lindsay
- Lord Spynie
- Scottish clan
