= Toísech =

Head of a local kin-group in medieval Scotland

A toísech or toísech clainne was the head of a local kin-group in medieval Scotland. The word, meaning "first" or "leader" in Scottish Gaelic, is first attested in the property records written into the Book of Deer some time between the 1130s and the 1150s.

The toísech held and extracted tribute from specific settlements within the kindred's territory, while other settlements provided tribute to the mormaer or king. The Book of Deer property records describe multiple lands whose tribute was granted to Deer Abbey by the mormaer and the toísech, each granting their respective renders, while one land was given by a lord "who was mormaer and was toiseach". showing that mormaers could themselves also be toiseachs.

The position of the toísech in the Book of Deer closely matches that of the thane given in the Leges inter Brettos et Scottos, a law code from the reign of David I that includes descriptions of the kingdom's social hierarchy, suggesting that the two roles were equivalent.

== Bibliography ==
- Broun, Dauvit (2015). "Statehood and lordship in 'Scotland' before the midtwelfth century". Innes Review. 66 (1): 1–71. doi:10.3366/inr.2015.0084.
- Grant, Alexander (2000). "The construction of the early Scottish state". In Maddicot, J. R.; Palliser, D. M. (eds.). The Medieval State: essays presented to James Campbell. London: Hambledon Press. pp. 47–72. ISBN 9781780275512.
- Taylor, Alice (2016). The Shape of the State in Medieval Scotland, 1124–1290. Oxford: Oxford University Press. ISBN 9780198749202.
