= Wauchope Castle =

Former Scottish castle

Coordinates: 55.1459°N 3.0140°W

Wauchope Castle was a castle located at Wauchope, in Dumfries and Galloway, Scotland.

The castle was a stronghold of the Lindsay family. It was the caput of the Barony of Wauchope. Built as a motte and bailey in the 13th century, it was reconstructed as a tower house in the 15th century before a manse house was constructed at the site, which was a ruin in the 18th century.
