= Prudhoe Community High School =

Location
- Moor Road; Prudhoe, NE42 5LJ; England; 54.956°N 1.850°W

Information
- Type: Academy
- Established: 1958; 68 years ago
- Local authority: Northumberland
- Trust: Tyne Community Learning Trust
- Department for Education URN: 146926 Tables
- Ofsted: Reports
- Head Teacher: A Moore
- Staff: 110 – 130 (approx.)
- Gender: Coeducational
- Age: 13 to 18
- Enrolment: 1,050 (approx.)
- Website: http://www.pchs.org.uk/

Prudhoe Community High School /ˈprʌdə/ is a coeducational high school and sixth form located in Prudhoe, Northumberland, England, situated on Moor Road. Pupils range from Year 9 to Year 13, with years 12-13 being part of the school's sixth form.

The school was originally opened in 1958, starting with around 400+ pupils. This has since expanded over the years to now serving around 1,000 students.

In September 2016, the new all-in-one school building opened, replacing the old and outdated campus buildings. In February 2025, the school temporarily closed after the discovery of structural issues in the building.

== Original campus ==
The school previously consisted of several buildings and departments (housed within 'blocks'). The main school building was where the maths, languages, and sciences departments were based, as well as ICT rooms, the Contemporary Arts department, the music department, and part of the PE department.

Other buildings included the humanities block, where the student support areas (Pastoral and Learning Support teams), finance office, and administrative staff were based. It was also where the Humanities department, consisting of history, geography, and ethics, was based. The block also housed the Drama department and a Police Office (which was staffed by Northumbria Police).

The school included an English block, a Sixth form study area, a DT and Business and ICT block, an Engineering building, and a full sports hall and gymnasium. The Art Building was opened by HM Queen Elizabeth II in May 1998.

The original sports hall previously included a squash court, a fitness room, plus a large gym with cricket batting nets and basketball courts.

The school had on average one IT classroom per department (with art, maths, and contemporary arts departments being the only departments not to have an IT room).

== Current campus ==
In March 2015 it was announced that Prudhoe would be getting a full new school rebuild following years of campaigning by a range of organisations and individuals including the local authority, representatives from the High School, local elected representatives and the wider local community. The tender for the building work was won by Sir Robert McAlpine who carried out the main construction. Various other contractors worked on the site including Owen Pugh and Armac Demotion.

The new building came at a cost of around £12.5m. Building work on it officially begun in the end half of 2015 and opened in September 2016. Located on the existing school site, The work entailed demolition of the existing main school building and part demolition of the existing sports hall, the erection of a two-storey school building, phased relocation, reconfiguration of vehicular and pedestrian access and laying out of associated car parking, cycle parking, boundary treatments and landscaping.

The scheme was built under the Priority Schools Building Programme and work was funded by the Education Funding Agency following a successful bid to the agency from Northumberland County Council.

=== Technology ===
Prudhoe Community High School used to be a specialist technology college, although from 2011 students were not obliged to study a technology subject at GCSE level. Currently courses include textiles, electronics, resistant materials, food, graphics (I.C.T. and traditional) and the 14–19 nationally acknowledged engineering diploma.

=== IT facilities ===
The school currently has 7 IT classrooms. As an educational establishment within the Northumberland LEA, PCHS has full WiFi access for staff and students in all of its buildings and outside coverage as well.

Every classroom in the school has at least one PC, with portable laptops available to students.

=== Learning Resource Centre ===
Prudhoe Community High School supports its pupils through a learning resource centre (known also as the LRC), which includes a library, career advice centre, creative area, and 26 computers for use by students.

=== Clubs ===
The Learning Resource Centre hosts to several after-school clubs. These include the year nine reading group and a homework club.

== Sports facilities ==
Outside the building are some basketball and tennis courts.

The school also has three large playing fields. One has athletics facilities (a sand pit and running track), one has football posts and the third is a 5G astro-turf pitch. The schools sporting facilities were reduced in wake of the construction of the FUSE Media Centre but have now been fully reinstated.
