= Dubacan of Angus =

Dubacan of Angus (Medieval Gaelic: Dubacan mac Indrechtaich) was Mormaer of Angus and the first mormaer of any of the provinces of the Kingdom of Alba to be named individually. He is mentioned as Dubucan filius Indrechtaig mormair Oengusa (i.e. "Dubucan son of Indrechtach, Mormaer of Angus") in the Chronicle of the Kings of Alba, and it is told that he died along with his lord, Amlaib, son of Constantine II of Scotland at the Battle of Brunanburh (c. 937).

There is another Dubacan, called Dufagan comes in a spurious foundation charter for Scone Abbey. The latter has no province name, but he is often called Mormaer or Earl of Angus because he shares the same name as Dubacan son of Indrechtach.

Dubacan is considered a probable ancestor of Gilla Brigte of Angus. It is possible that Dubacan was succeeded by a man called Cuncar, although there is no information about their exact relationship.

== Bibliography ==
- Woolf, Alex (2007). From Pictland to Alba 789–1070. Edinburgh: Edinburgh University Press. ISBN 9780748612345.

Preceded by ?	Mormaer of Angus d. 937	Succeeded by ?Cuncar
