= Prudhoe Castle =

Ruined castle in Northumberland, England

- Northumberland, England
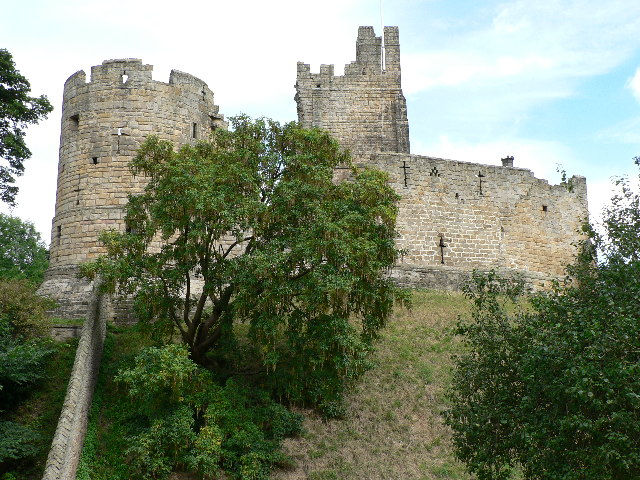
- Prudhoe Castle

Site information
- Type: Motte-and-bailey converted to keep and bailey
- Owner: English Heritage
- Open to the public: Yes

Location
- Shown within Northumberland
- Coordinates: 54.964°N 1.854°W
- Grid reference: grid reference NZ094633

Site history
- Materials: Stone

Prudhoe Castle /ˈprʌdə/ is a ruined medieval English castle situated on the south bank of the River Tyne at Prudhoe, Northumberland, England. It is a Scheduled Ancient Monument and a Grade I listed building.

== The Umfravilles ==
Archaeological excavations have shown that the first castle on the site was a Norman motte and bailey, built sometime in the mid 11th century. Following the Norman Conquest of England, the Umfraville family took over control of the castle. Robert d’Umfraville was formally granted the barony of Prudhoe by Henry I but it is likely that the Umfravilles had already been granted Prudhoe in the closing years of the 11th century. The Umfravilles (probably Robert) initially replaced the wooden palisade with a massive rampart of clay and stones and subsequently constructed a stone curtain wall and gatehouse.

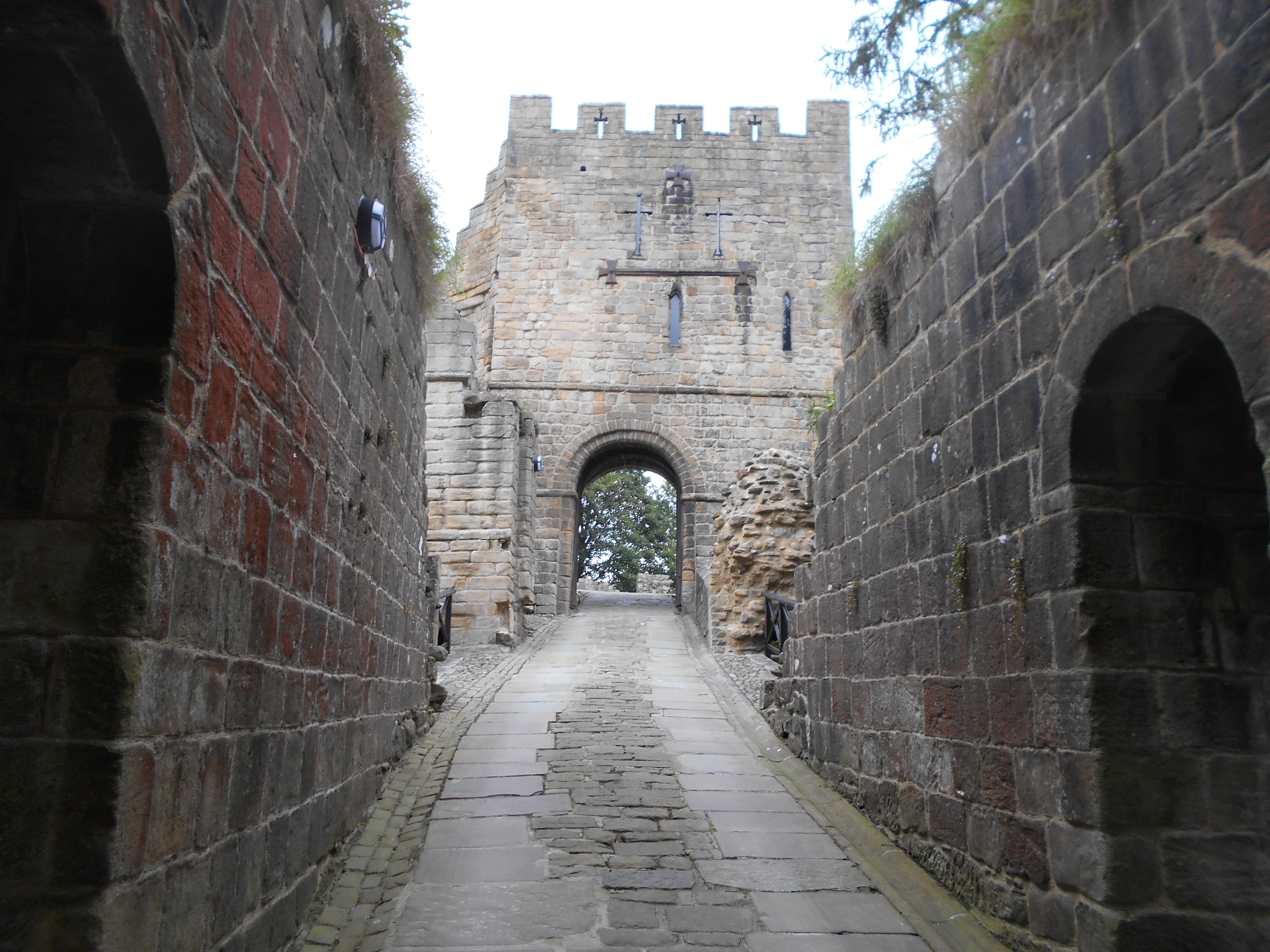
The castle's 12th-century gatehouse

In 1173 William the Lion of Scotland invaded the North East to claim the earldom of Northumberland. The head of the Umfraville family, Odinel II, refused to support him and as a result the Scottish army tried to take Prudhoe Castle. The attempt failed as the Scots were not prepared to undertake a lengthy siege. The following year William attacked the castle again but found that Odinel had strengthened the garrison, and after a siege of just three days the Scottish army left. Following the siege, Odinel further improved the defences of the castle by adding a stone keep and a great hall.

Odinel died in 1182 and was succeeded by his son Richard. Richard became one of the barons who stood against King John, and as a result forfeited his estates to the crown. They remained forfeited until 1217, the year after King John's death. Richard died in 1226 and was succeeded by his son, Gilbert, who was himself succeeded in 1245 by his son Gilbert. Through his mother, Gilbert II inherited the title of Earl of Angus, with vast estates in Scotland, but he continued to spend some of his time at Prudhoe. It is believed that he carried out further improvements to the castle. Gilbert took part in the fighting between Henry III of England and his barons, and in the Scottish expeditions of Edward I. He died in 1308 and was succeeded by his son, Robert D’Umfraville IV. In 1314, Robert was taken prisoner by the Scots at Bannockburn, but was soon released, though he was deprived of the earldom of Angus and of his Scottish estates. In 1316 King Edward granted Robert 700 marks to maintain a garrison of 40 men-at-arms and 80 light horsemen at Prudhoe.

In 1381 the last of the line, Gilbert III, died without issue and his widow married Henry Percy, 1st Earl of Northumberland. On her death in 1398, the castle passed to the Percy family.

== The Percys ==
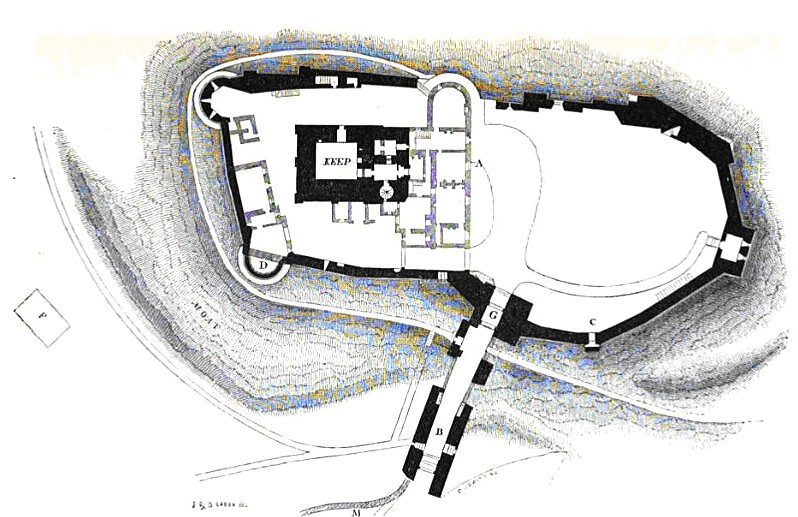
Plan of Prudhoe Castle in mid-19th century: A - modern buildings; B - barbican; C- garderobe (toilet); D - tower; F - site of chapel; G - gateway; M - mill pond.

The Percys added a new great hall to the castle shortly after they took possession of it. Henry Percy, 1st Earl of Northumberland fought against Henry IV and took part in the Battle of Shrewsbury, for which act he was attainted and his estates, including Prudhoe, were forfeited to the Crown in 1405. That same year it was granted to the future Duke of Bedford, (a son of Henry IV) and stayed in his hands until his death in 1435, whereupon it reverted to the Crown.

The Percys regained ownership of the Prudhoe estates in 1440, after a prolonged legal battle. However, Henry Percy, 3rd Earl of Northumberland fought on the Lancastrian side in the Wars of the Roses and was killed at the Battle of Towton in 1461. In 1462 Edward IV granted Prudhoe to his younger brother George, Duke of Clarence. The latter only possessed the castle briefly before the king granted it to Lord Montague.

The castle was restored to the fourth Earl in 1470. The principal seat of the Percys was Alnwick Castle and Prudhoe was for the most part let out to tenants. In 1528 however Henry Percy 6th Earl was resident at the castle as later was his brother Sir Thomas Percy. Both the Earl and Sir Thomas were heavily involved in the Pilgrimage of Grace in 1536 and both were convicted of treason and executed. Following forfeiture of the estates the castle was reported in August 1537 to have habitable houses and towers within its walls, although they were said to be somewhat decayed and in need of repairs estimated at £20.

The castle was once again restored to Thomas Percy, the 7th Earl in about 1557. He was convicted of taking part in the Rising of the North in 1569. He escaped, but was recaptured and was executed in 1572.

The castle was thereafter let out to many and various tenants and was not used as a residence after the 1660s. In 1776 it was reported to be ruinous.

Between 1808 and 1817, Hugh Percy, 2nd Duke of Northumberland carried out substantial repairs to the ancient fabric and replaced the old dwellings within the walls with a Georgian mansion adjoining the keep.

In 1966 the castle was given over to the Crown and is now in the custody of English Heritage and is open to the public.

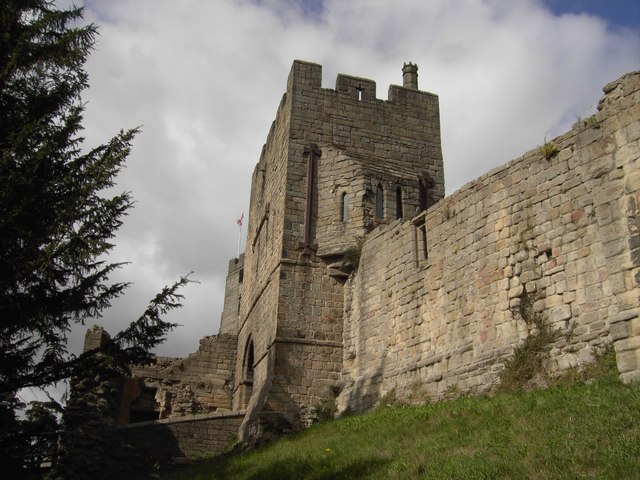
View of the front gate to the castle

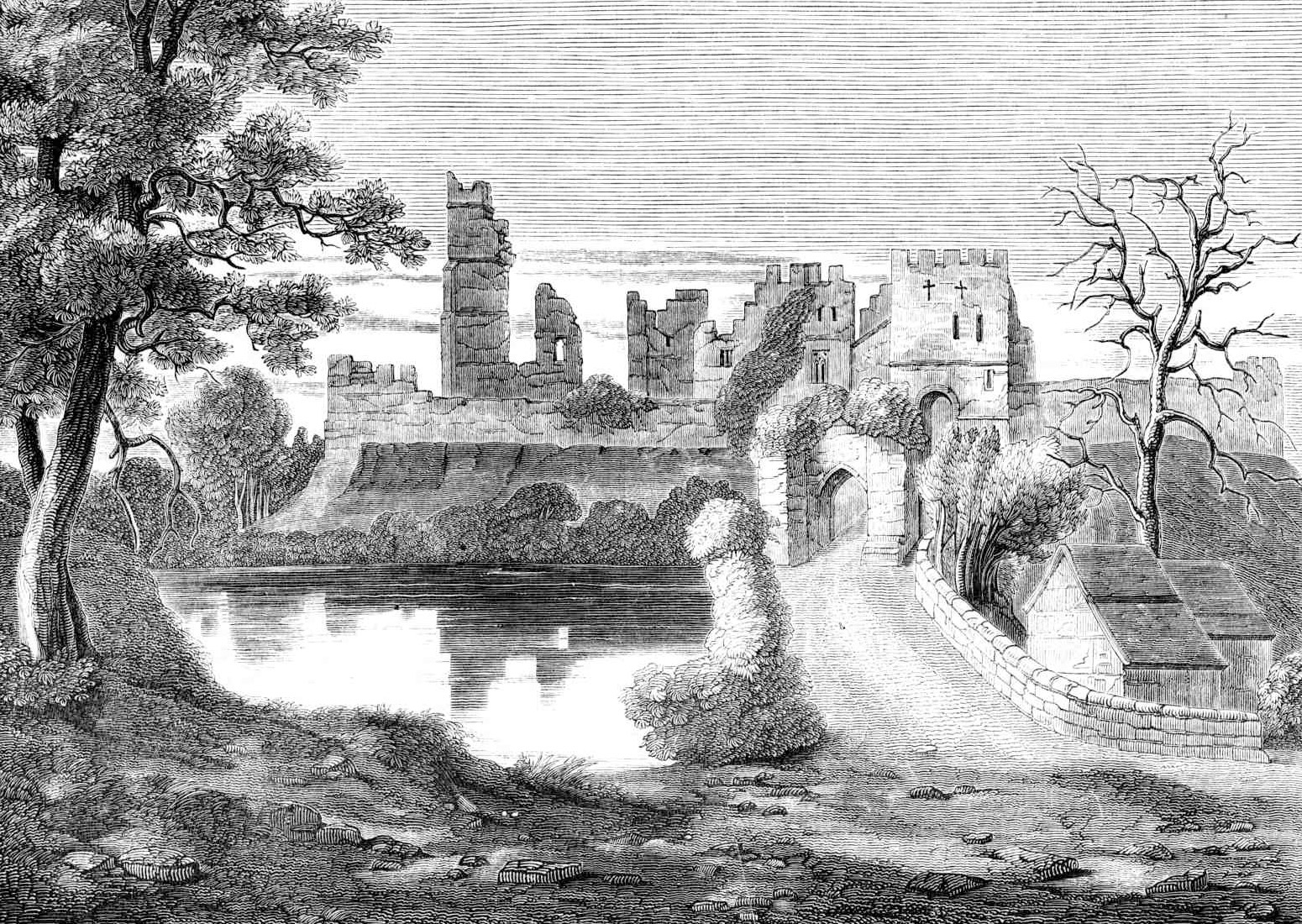
Prudhoe Castle in Old England: A Pictorial Museum (1845) by C. Knight

== Description ==
The castle stands on a ridge about 150 feet (46 m) on the south bank of the River Tyne. It is partly enclosed by a deep moat. The ground to the north falls away steeply to the river. The castle entrance is on the south side and is flanked by a mill pond on the left and a ruined water mill on the right. The castle is entered by a barbican dating from the first half of the 14th century. The gatehouse, dating from the early 12th century, leads into the outer ward; which contains the remains of several buildings. At the north side, against the curtain wall, are the remains of the Great Hall, measuring 60 ft by 46 ft (18m by 14m), built by the Percies when they took over the castle. At the end of the 15th century a new hall was built to the west to replace the existing one.

On the west side of the outer ward is the manor house, built in the early 19th century, and containing a visitor's shop and exhibition rooms. At the south end of the manor house is a gateway leading into the inner ward. The main feature of the inner ward is the keep, dating from the 12th century. The keep has walls 10 feet (3.0 m) thick and its internal dimensions are 20 ft by 24 ft (7.3m by 6.1m). It originally consisted of two storeys beneath a double-pitched roof.

== Civil parish ==
Prudhoe Castle was a civil parish: in 1951 the parish had a population of 1005. Prudhoe Castle was formerly a township; from 1866 Prudhoe Castle was a civil parish in its own right until it was abolished on 1 April 1974 and merged with Prudhoe.

== See also ==
- Aydon Castle
- Castles in Great Britain and Ireland
- List of castles in England
