= Gille Críst, Earl of Angus =

Earl of Angus, Scotland (died 1206)

Gille Críst, Earl of Angus, Mormaer of Angus, ruled until 1206. He was a son of Gille Brigte of Angus and younger brother of Adam of Angus.

== Life ==
Almost nothing is known of him except that he married Marjorie of Huntingdon, daughter of Henry of Scotland and wife Ada de Warenne, and that he was succeeded by his son Donnchad before 1206. His daughter Bethóc (Beatrix) was married to Walter Stewart, 3rd High Steward of Scotland, and was mother to Alexander Stewart, 4th High Steward of Scotland. It is claimed that Marjorie of Huntingdon married secondly (as his second wife), Sir William de Lindsay of Luffness and Crawford (born c. 1148 – died c. 1200), but such a marriage did not occur. Gille Críst, Earl of Angus and Marjorie of Huntingdon were ancestors of Robert I (known as Robert the Bruce), King of Scots (b. 11 July 1274 - d. 7 June 1329).

== Issue ==
Gille Críst, 4th Earl of Angus, had by his first wife Marjorie of Huntingdon (youngest daughter of Henry of Scotland, Earl of Huntingdon, and his wife Ada de Warenne) the following son and daughter:

- Donnchadh (or Donnchad), 5th Earl of Angus who succeeded him before 1206.
- Bethóc (or Beatrix), who was married to Walter Stewart, 3rd High Steward of Scotland and mother to Alexander Stewart, 4th High Steward of Scotland.

Gille Críst, 4th Earl of Angus, had by his second wife Ingibiorg Ericsdottir of Caithness (daughter of Eric Thorliotsson) the following son:

- Magnus II, Earl of Orkney and Caithness

== See also ==
- Sir Robert de Pinkeney, Baron of Pinkeney (d. 1296). 13th-century English noble and a competitor for the Crown of Scotland.

== Bibliography ==
- Sir James Balfour Paul. The Scots Peerage: founded on Wood's edition of Sir Robert Douglas's, The Peerage of Scotland, (Edinburgh, Scotland: David Douglas, 1904), vol. 1, pp. 4, 5, 12, 13, & 160-165.
- Cokayne, G.E., The Complete Peerage. New ed., vol. 1, (London, 1910), p. 146.
- Roberts, John L., Lost Kingdoms: Celtic Scotland in the Middle Ages, (Edinburgh, 1997), pp. 53–54
- Weir, Alison. Britain's Royal Families: The Complete Genealogy (London, U.K.: The Bodley Head, 1999), p. 196.
- Richardson, Douglas. Royal Ancestry: A Study in Colonial and Medieval Families, vol. 4, (2013), pp. 582–583: [author states, "They had three sons, ... , and four daughters. Children of Henry of Scotland, by Ada de Warenne: i. Malcolm IV of Scotland, ii. William the lion, King of Scots, iii. David of Scotland, iv. Maud of Scotland, v. Margaret of Scotland, vi. Ada of Scotland, vii. ______ of Scotland (daughter)."].

Preceded by Adam	Mormaer of Angus -1206	Succeeded by Donnchadh
