= Margaret de Menteith =

Margaret de Menteith (fl 1311–1324) was a daughter of Alexander, Earl of Menteith and his wife Matilda. She was the wife of Alexander de Abernethy, a noted Scottish knight and opponent of Robert I of Scotland. She is first encountered in historical records as "lady Margaret de Abrenythy", a lady of the court of Isabella of France, Queen of England, in 1311/12. She resided in England as late as 30 January 1324/5, when the Calendar of Patent Rolls recorded the grant by King Edward II of England: "Licence for Margaret de Abernythyn to go to Scotland to treat with her friends for the recovery of the lands of her inheritance in Scotland."

Margaret was daughter of Alexander, Earl of Menteith.

Her issue by Sir Alexander de Abernethy includes two daughters:

- Margaret de Abernethy, wife of Sir John Stewart, Earl of Angus; and
- Mary de Abernethy, wife of (1) Sir Andrew de Leslie and (2) Sir David de Lindsay.

== See also ==
- F. D. Blackley, The Household Book of Queen Isabella of England (Edmonton: University of Alberta Press, 1971), p. xiv.
- Calendar of Patent Rolls, 18 Edw II pt. 2, page 87, mem. 32.
- J. Ravilious, The Earls of Menteith: Alexander, Earl of Menteith and Sir Alexander de Abernethy, The Scottish Genealogist (September 2010), Vol. LVII, No. 3, pp. 130–139.
