= Alexander de Abernethy =

Scottish baron (after 1271–c. 1315)

- Born: > 1271
- Died: c. 1315
- Spouse: Margaret de Menteith
- Issue: Margaret and Mary
- Father: Hugh de Abernethy
- Mother: Maria de Ergadia

Alexander de Abernethy (after 1271 – c. 1315) was a Scottish baron. He was a son of Hugh de Abernethy and Maria de Ergadia. Alexander was a descendant of abbots of Abernethy; his great-grandfather Laurence, great-grandson of Gillemichael, Earl of Fife, was the first to style himself Lord (dominus) His daughter Margaret married John Stewart of Bonkyll, the new Scottish earl of Angus.

Alexander swore fealty to Edward I in 1291, presumably on the death of his father, Hugh. Between 1301 and 1303 he was appointed warden of Scotland between the Forth and the Mounth. He joined the expedition in 1303 to Strathearn and in 1304 to Menteith to put down uprisings. He lost the office in King Edward's ordinances of 1305 but supported Balliol's claims over Bruce's. He was ordered to join the expedition of John of Brittany to defend Galloway against Robert Bruce and was absent from King Robert's first parliament in 1309. In June 1308 he was appointed warden of Scotland between the Forth and Orkney together with Edward Hastings; and in July 1310 - warden between the Forth and the mountains. He was also contracted to serve from September in Berwick and Perthshire under the command of Sir John de Segrave. He received Clackmannan in Stirlingshire from Edward II in 1310, was Constable of Dundee at least in mid-1311 and led the unsuccessful defence of the town against Edward Bruce in 1312. In 1314 Abernethy was forfeited and attached to the earldom of Angus, so Alexander went to England and died by the end of 1315. He also held the positions of the Sheriffdoms of Kincardine, Forfar and Perth and joint warden between the Forth and Orkney.

He married Margaret de Menteith, daughter of Alexander, Earl of Menteith. Lady Margaret de Abrenythy was a lady of the court of Isabella of France, Queen of England, 1311/12. She resided in England as late as 30 Jan 1324/5, when a record in the Calendar of Patent Rolls dated at Langley stated, ' 860. The K. signifies that he has granted leave to Margaret de Abernethy to visit Scotland, to treat with her friends there as to recovery of her hereditary lands. Langley. '

They had issue:

- Margaret de Abernethy, wife of John Stewart, 1st Earl of Angus.
- Mary de Abernethy, wife of (1) Sir Andrew de Leslie, and (2) Sir David de Lindsay.

== Sources ==
- Joseph Bain (ed.) Calendar of documents relating to Scotland, volume 3;
- C. A. McGladdery, ‘Abernethy family (per. c.1260–c.1465)’, Oxford Dictionary of National Biography, OUP (2004);
- Cal. Patent Rolls, 18 Edw. II. p. 2, p. 87, m. 32.
- Bain, Cal. Docs. Scotland III:157, no. 860.
- Charles J. Leslie, Historical Records of the Family of Leslie (Edinburgh: Edmonston and Douglas, 1869), p. 37.
- J. Ravilious, The Earls of Menteith: Alexander, Earl of Menteith and Sir Alexander de Abernethy, The Scottish Genealogist (September 2010), Vol. LVII, No. 3, pp. 130–139.
