= Lamberton Castle =

Former Scottish castle

Coordinates: 55.8063°N 2.0653°W

Lamberton Castle was a castle located at Lamberton, in Scottish Borders, Scotland.

The castle was a stronghold of the Lindsay family. It was the caput of the Barony of Lamberton. Edward Seymour, Earl of Hertford during an expedition in 1544, destroyed the castle. No remains of the castle exist above ground.
