= Máel Coluim, Earl of Angus =

Medieval Gael

Máel Coluim, Earl of Angus, was a Scottish nobleman who was mormaer of Angus roughly from 1214 to 1240. He was the last of his family in the male line with title over that province.

He married Mary, daughter and heiress of Humphrey de Berkeley. They had one son, Richard, and a daughter, Matilda, who married three times:

1. John Comyn (died 1242)
2. Gilbert de Umfraville, Baron of Prudhoe, Northumberland, and
3. Richard de Dover, Baron of Chilham, Kent and a grandson of King John of England (Dover died between 1247 and 1261), with issue.

When Máel Coluim died without a living male heir c. 1240 the mormaership passed to his daughter, through whom her husbands held title.

Preceded by Donnchad	Mormaer of Angus; 1214–1240	Succeeded by Matilda m. John Comyn (d. 1242); m. Gilbert de Umfraville
