= Crawford, South Lanarkshire =

Coordinates: 55.46254°N 3.66218°W

Crawford
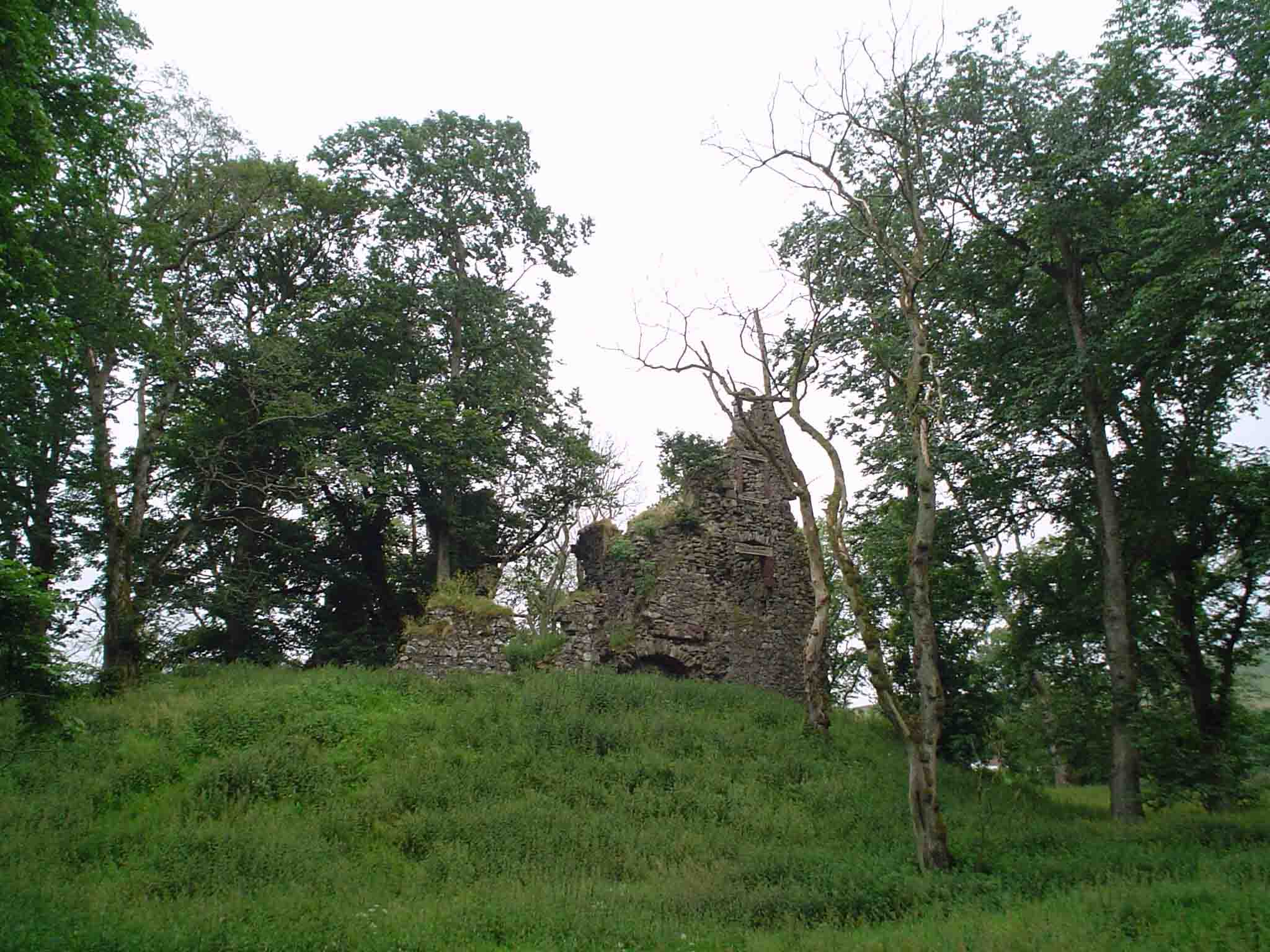
- Crawford Castle

- Location within South Lanarkshire
- OS grid reference: NS9520
- Council area: South Lanarkshire
- Lieutenancy area: Lanarkshire
- Country: Scotland
- Sovereign state: United Kingdom
- Post town: BIGGAR
- Postcode district: ML12
- Police: Scotland
- Fire: Scottish
- Ambulance: Scottish
- UK Parliament: Dumfriesshire, Clydesdale and Tweeddale
- Scottish Parliament: Clydesdale

Crawford is a village and civil parish in South Lanarkshire, Scotland.

Crawford is close to the source of the River Clyde and the A74(M) motorway, 50 miles (80 km) southeast of Glasgow and 53 miles (85 km) northwest of Carlisle. It has a population of around 300 people and a school.

== History ==
The village is close to an old Roman road and has links with Sir William Wallace (see Crawford Castle). Recent archaeological excavations have shown that this was the site of a Roman fort between 80 and 140 AD, housing perhaps 300 soldiers.

Crawford is also said to be one of the most haunted villages in Scotland. The old Post Horn Inn, which dated from the 1400s and was made larger around 1744, was the 8th stop from Edinburgh to London, having accommodated important clients as noted in a book about the property. The Inn, now closed as a public house and hotel, is said to have been haunted by three ghosts. One was said to be a young girl, who was accidentally killed by a coach in the Main Street and who was the daughter of a former innkeeper. Her apparition had allegedly been seen in the dining room, which had originally been the stables, it is said that she was responsible for the movement of chairs around the room and the ghostly sound of her singing to herself. Another alleged phantom was reportedly that of a coachman who wore a dark cloak and it was believed by the locals that he had died in 1805. A third ghostly sighting was that of a five-year-old girl who was said to have been hanged for stealing bread. Ghostly Roman legionaries are also said to have been seen marching up the Main Street of Crawford. Various reports described them as only being seen from the knees up as the level of the road in Roman times was much lower than it currently is today.
