= Thomas Stewart, 2nd Earl of Angus =

Scottish nobleman

Arms of Thomas Stewart, 2nd Earl of Angus: Quarterly: 1 and 4; Gold, a fess chequy blue and silver, surmounted by a red bend charged with three gold buckles (Stewart of Bonkyll). 2 and 3. Gold, a red lion rampant debruised by a black ribbon (Abernethy)

Thomas Stewart, 2nd Earl of Angus (c. 1331–1361) was a medieval Scottish nobleman.

He was the son of John Stewart of Bonkyll and Margaret de Abernethy. Stewart was an infant when his father died and inherited his estates and titles in Berwickshire, Abernethy and Angus.

In 1353 he married Margaret Sinclair, a daughter of William de St Clair of Rosslyn. (St Clair was slain in 1330, along with Sir James Douglas, at the Battle of Teba whilst accompanying King Robert's Heart to the Holy Land.) The petition for this marriage was sent to the Holy See, with support from John II of France, which would suggest that the young Angus spent time at the French court.

Present at the siege of Berwick in 1355, Angus was one of the lords that negotiated the release of David II following his 10-year captivity following the Battle of Neville's Cross. At some point in the late 1350s, Stewart was made Great Chamberlain of Scotland, an office he lost at some point before 1359, when Walter de Biggar was in office.

Angus was considered one of the conspirators in the murder of King David's mistress, Catherine Mortimer, at Soutra in 1360, and was duly imprisoned. Whilst being held at Dumbarton Castle, he succumbed to Bubonic plague in 1361.

== Marriage and issue ==
Thomas Stewart had two daughters by Margaret Sinclair:

- Margaret Stewart, Countess of Angus and Mar, and mother to George Douglas, 1st Earl of Angus
- Elizabeth Stewart, married Alexander Hamilton of Ballencrieff and Innerwick, ancestors of the Earls of Haddington.

== Sources ==
- Balfour Paul, Sir James. The Scots Peerage-IX Vols. Edinburgh 1904
- Maxwell, Sir Herbert. A History of the House of Douglas-II Vols. London 1902

Peerage of Scotland
| Preceded by John Stewart | Earl of Angus; 1331–1361 | Succeeded by Margaret Stewart |
