= Margaret Stewart, Countess of Angus =

Margaret Stewart, Countess of Angus and Mar (died 1417) was Countess of Angus and Lady of Abernethy in her own right. Her father was Thomas Stewart, 2nd Earl of Angus.

She was married to Thomas, Earl of Mar with whom she had no children. After her husband's death in 1374, she began an extramarital affair with William Douglas, 1st Earl of Douglas, who was married to the Earl of Mar's sister. With the Earl of Douglas, she had two children, George Douglas, 1st Earl of Angus (c. 1380–1403) and Lady Margaret Douglas who in 1404 received the lands of Bonjedward from her half-sister, Lady Isabel Douglas. The countess secured a charter of her estates for her son, to whom, in 1389 the title was granted by King Robert II.

== See also ==
- Earl of Angus

Peerage of Scotland
Preceded by Thomas Stewart	Countess of Angus; 1361–1389	Resigned titles regranted to George Douglas.
