= Robert de Umfraville, Earl of Angus =

Anglo-Norman nobleman

Robert de Umfraville Earl of Angus
- Arms of Robert de Umfreville. Gules, crusily and a cinquefoyle or, a bendlet azure".
- Died: 1325
- Resting place: Newminster Abbey
- Spouses: Lucy de Kyme, Eleanor
- Parents: Gilbert de Umfraville (father); Elizabeth Comyn (mother)

Robert de Umfraville, 8th Earl of Angus, of Prudhoe, Chollerton, Harbottle, and Whelpington, Northumberland (c. 1277 – 1325) was an Anglo-Norman baron in Northumberland and the eighth Earl of Angus.

== Life ==
Robert was the second son of Gilbert de Umfraville and Elizabeth Comyn, daughter of Alexander Comyn, Earl of Buchan. Umfraville was more than thirty years old at his father's death.

Umfraville adhered to King Edward II of England both against Scots and barons, and was regularly summoned to the English parliaments as Earl of Angus (although in name only – the title had ceased to have any meaning whatsoever since the outbreak of the 1296 First War of Scottish Independence). He was summoned to the coronation of King Edward II of England in February 1308. He was Joint Lieutenant and Guardian of Scotland from 21 June 1308, and appointed to treat for peace with the Scots on numerous occasions. He fought at the Battle of Bannockburn, and was taken prisoner after the battle by Robert Bruce, but soon released. In 1316 he was commissioned to treat with the Scots for a truce.

Though formerly in opposition to the Despensers, he sat in judgment on Thomas of Lancaster. King Robert deprived him of his Scottish estates and title, and before 1329 the real earldom had been vested in the House of Stewart, from whom it passed in 1389 to a branch of the Douglases. Robert died in 1325 and was buried at Newminster Abbey, Northumberland, England.

== Marriages and issue ==
Robert married twice. His first wife was Lucy, sister and heiress of William of Kyme, whose considerable estates in Yorkshire and Lincolnshire, including the castle of Kyme, passed thus to the Umfravilles. They had the following known issues:

- Gilbert (d.c.1380), married firstly Joan de Willoughby and secondly Maud de Lucy; had issue.
- Elizabeth, married Gilbert de Boroughdon.

By his second wife, Eleanor, the widow of Richard Fitz Marmaduke of Horden, they had the following known issue:

- Robert (d.1379), married Eleanor de Widdrington; without issue.
- Thomas (d.1387), married Joan de Roddam; had an issue.
- Annora, married Stephen le Waleys, 2nd Lord Waleys.

== See also ==
- George Douglas, 1st Earl of Angus

== Citations ==
Attribution

This article incorporates text from a publication now in the public domain: Tout, Thomas Frederick (1899). "Umfraville, Gilbert de (1244?-1307)". In Lee, Sidney (ed.). Dictionary of National Biography. Vol. 58. London: Smith, Elder & Co.
