= Crawford Castle =

Castle in South Lanarkshire, Scotland

Coordinates: 55.4747°N 3.6558°W

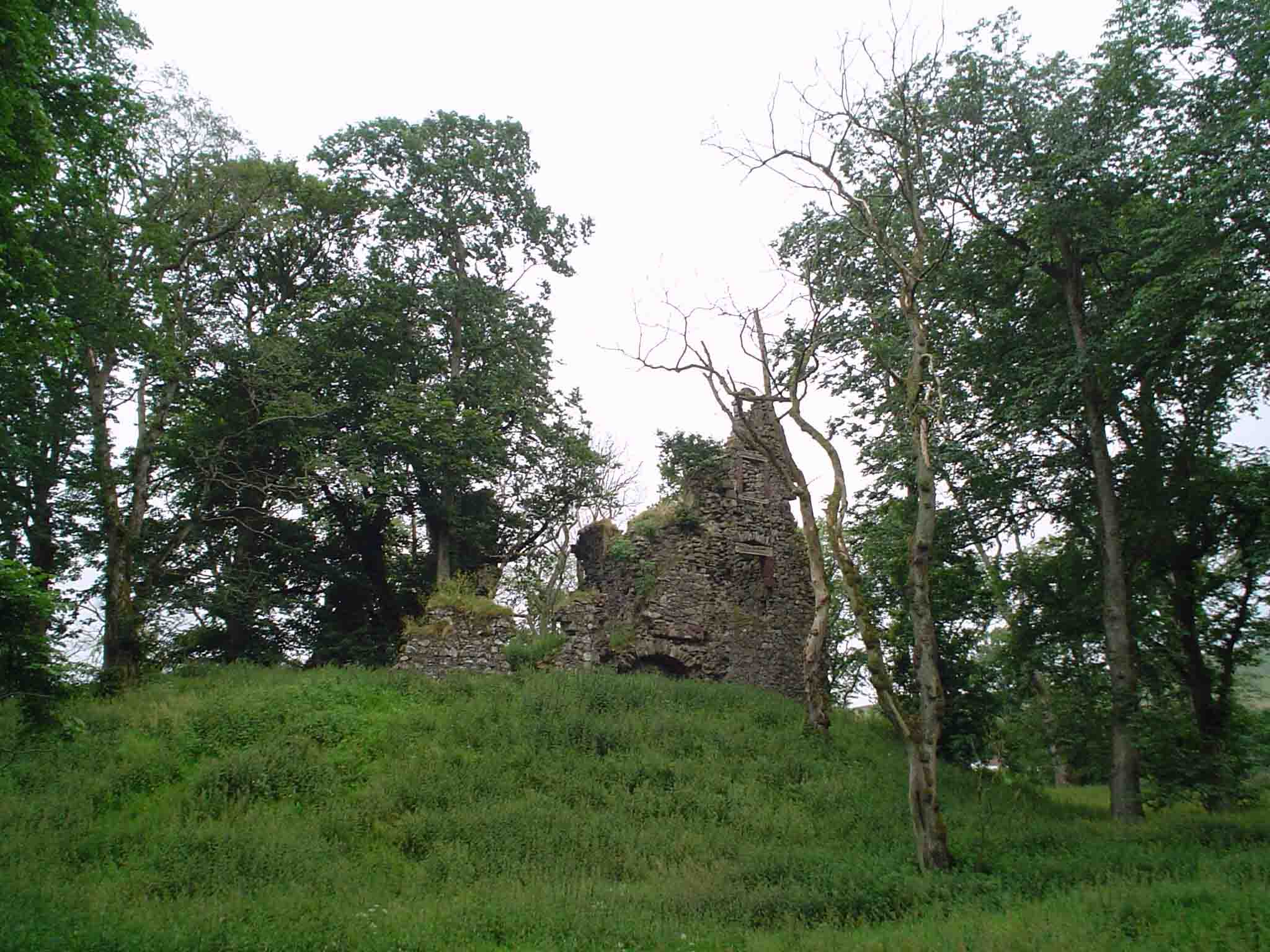
The ruins of Crawford Castle

Crawford Castle, substantially in ruins, is located on the north bank of the River Clyde, around 1/2 mile (800 metres) north of Crawford, South Lanarkshire, Scotland. The ruins stand on an earlier motte and bailey earthwork. The castle is also known as Lindsay Tower, after its former owners, the Lindsay family. The strategic location of the castle, at NS954213, guards the strategically important Mennock Pass from England into the upper Clyde Valley.

== History ==
Archaeological excavations to the north-west of the castle have shown that a Roman fort, with a garrison of perhaps 300, existed at this site between 80 AD and 170 AD.

This site was the administrative centre for the Barony of Crawford, at that time the largest and most influential barony in southern Scotland. The Barony was established before 1100 when records of the period show Sveinn as Lord of Crawford. Upon his death, his son Thor, Lord of Tranent and the Sheriff of Edinburghshire, is recorded as Lord of Crawford. Crawford Castle was in existence by 1175, and was probably built as an earthwork and timber castle some time before this by Thor, or indeed by Thor's father Sveinn.

The Lindsay family inherited the barony of Crawford when William Lindsay married ca. 1154 the younger daughter of Thor, and granddaughter of Sveinn, Lord of Crawford or following the death of Thor in about 1165. It was probably William Lindsay who built the stone castle by 1175. He is recorded as Lord of Crawford by 1185x1190. Crawford Castle is located in Crawford Parish. From an early date, the Clan Carmichael of Meadowflatt acted as hereditary constables of the castle, retaining this post under successive owners.

In 1398, Robert II granted the title of Earl of Crawford to David Lindsay, who had won great praise on St George’s Day, 23 April 1390 for bravery in a duel with the Englishman Baron Welles on London Bridge after Welles, as Champion of England, at a banquet in Edinburgh and presumably after too much alcohol, issued the challenge: "Let words have no place; if ye know not the Chivalry and Valiant deeds of Englishmen; appoint me a day and a place where ye list, and ye shall have experience."

At the accession of James IV in 1488 the barony of Crawford was transferred to Archibald Douglas, 5th Earl of Angus for supporting the young prince's rebellion against his father James III. The Earls of Angus held the castle until 1528, when their estates were forfeited by the young James V. James used Crawford as a hunting lodge until his own death in 1542. His mistress, Elizabeth Carmichael, was the daughter of the hereditary constable. She was the mother of John Stewart, Commendator of Coldingham. James V and Mary of Guise came to Crawford in July 1541 bringing tapestry to furnish their lodging at the castle. George Carmichael, son of the Captain of Crawford, presented three ounces of Scottish gold to the queen.

After 1542 the barony was returned to the Earls of Angus, the keepership of the Carmichaels of Meadowflatt coming to an end in 1595. In 1633 the 11th earl was created Marquess of Douglas, and the castle was probably rebuilt after this date. The castle then passed to the Duke of Hamilton, before being sold to Sir George Colebrooke in the 18th century. After a period of use as a farmhouse, the building was abandoned at the end of the 18th century, and much of the stone reused to build the present Crawford Castle Farm. Four stone tablets bearing coats of arms, one with the date 1648, are built into the west and south walls of the Castle Crawford House.

== Ruins ==
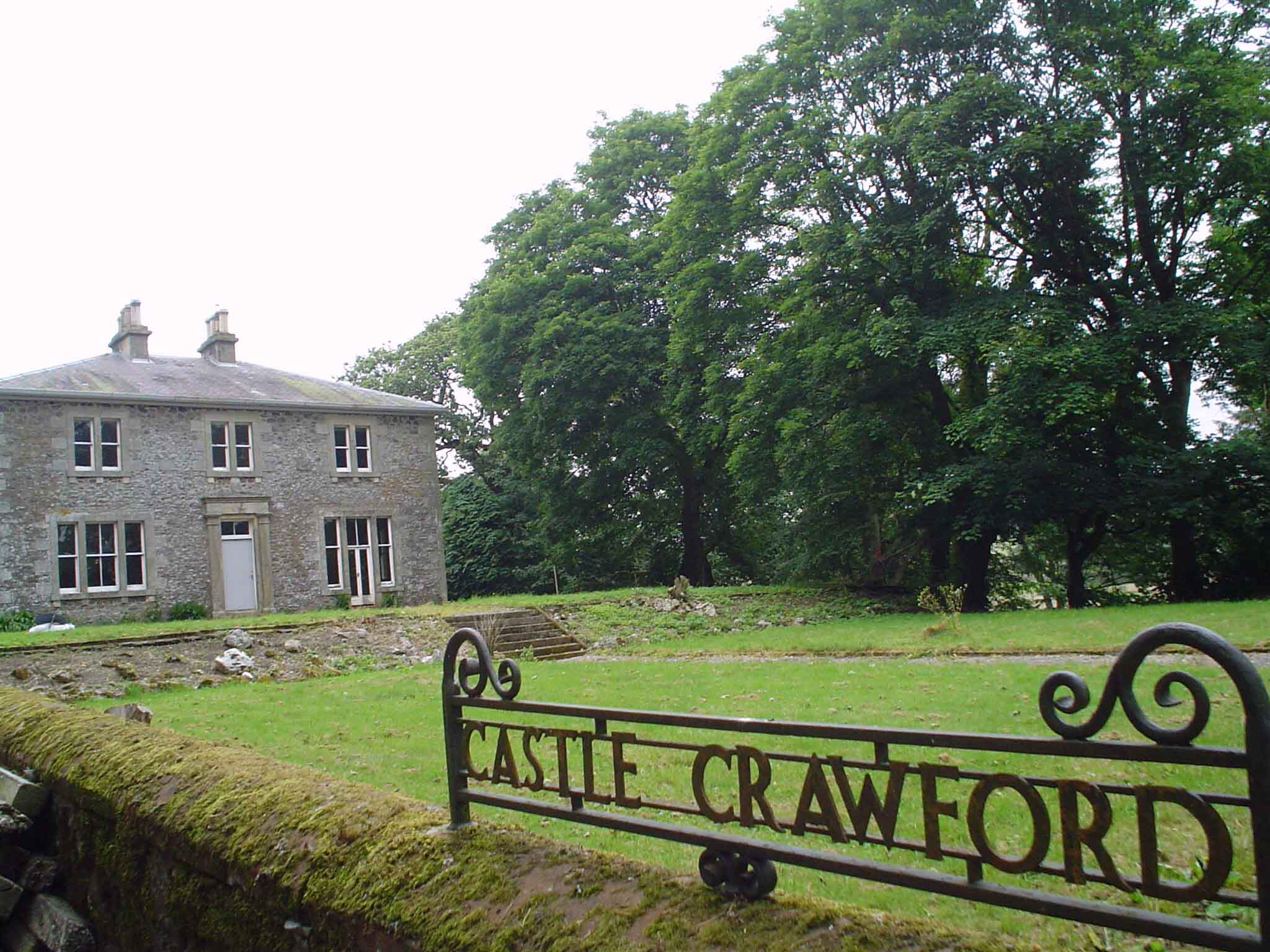
Castle Crawford House, partially built using stone reclaimed from the nearby castle ruins.

The early earthworks of Crawford Castle comprise a motte around 5 m high, with a surrounding ditch and a bailey some 45 m by 33 m to the south-west. On the motte are the remains of a curtain wall, surrounding an enclosure around 20 m square. There may have been round towers at the corners of this enclosure, which probably dates to the 16th or early 17th centuries. A range of buildings on the south-west side of the castle were built at around the same time. This tower-like range was of three storeys, plus an attic, with a vaulted basement and projecting chimney-breast. To the south-east, a second range was added later in the 17th century, providing more spacious accommodation with larger windows. The prominent arched recess in the east wall suggests that a single storey building of some kind projected from the main structure at this location. Much of the present remains probably date from the 17th century rebuilding by the Marquess of Douglas.

Crawford Castle is specified in a list of monuments published by the Minister of Public Building and Works under the Ancient Monuments Consolidation and Amendment Act 1913. It is now a Scheduled Ancient Monument. The Royal Commission on the Ancient and Historical Monuments of Scotland lists the site as a castle or motte.
