= Barnweill Castle =

Former Scottish castle

Coordinates: 55.5385°N 4.5257°W

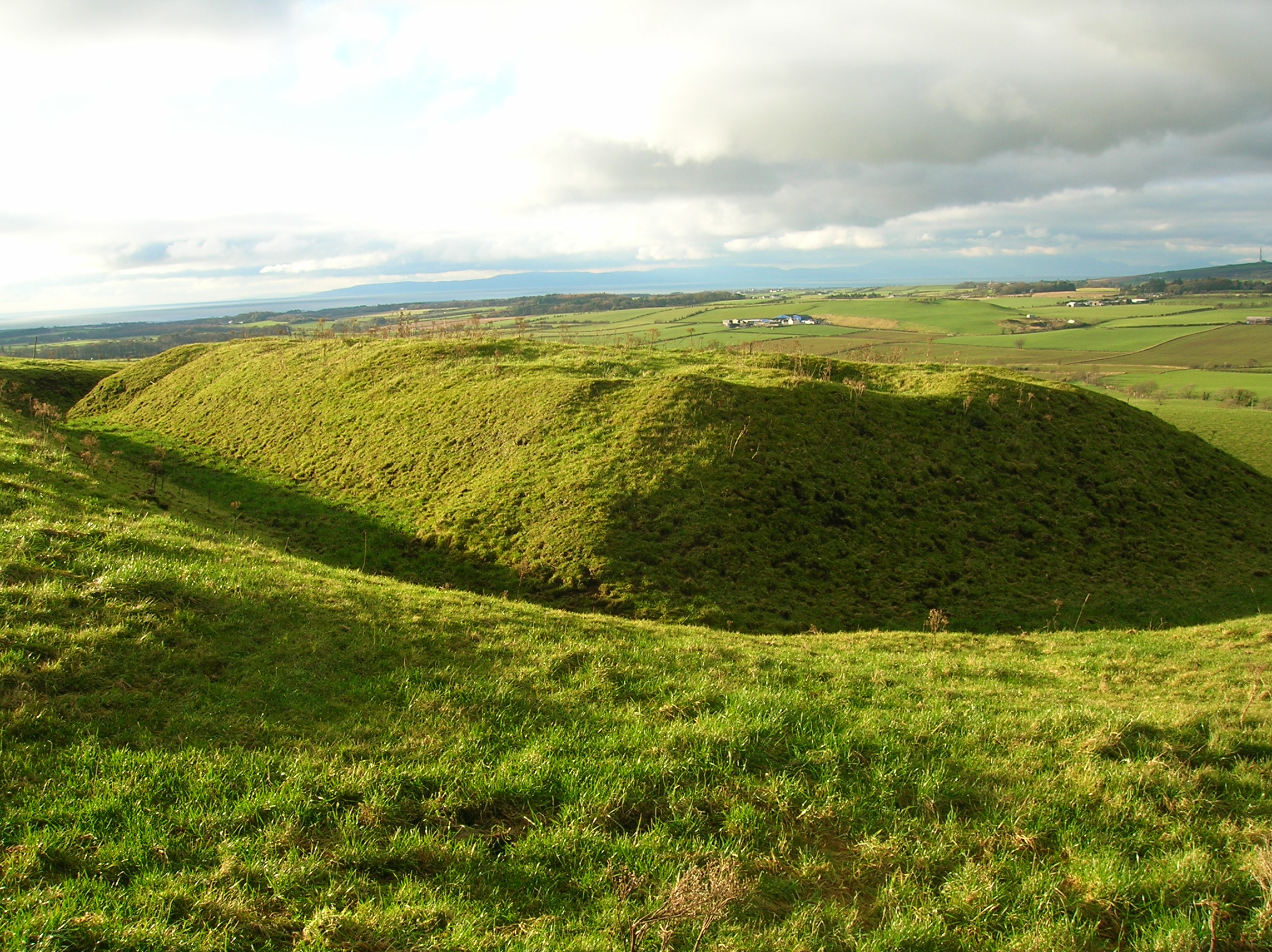
Barnweill castle remains.

Barnweill Castle was a castle located at Barnweill, in the parish of Craigie, South Ayrshire, Scotland.

The castle was a stronghold of the Lindsay family. A rectangular moat is located around the motte, the caput of the Barony of Barnweill.
