= Byres Castle =

Former Scottish castle

Coordinates: 55.9833°N 2.8095°W

Byres Castle was a castle located at Byres, in East Lothian, Scotland.

The castle was a stronghold of the Lindsay family, known as Lord Lindsay of the Byres. It was the caput of the Barony of Byres. No remains of the castle exist above ground. An old farm building is incorrectly known as the castle.
