= Prudhoe =

Town and civil parish in Northumberland, England

Coordinates: 54.961°N 1.849°W

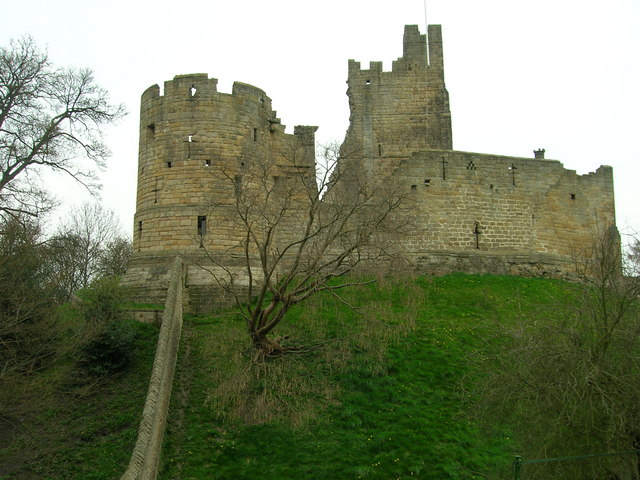
- Prudhoe Castle

- Location within Northumberland
- Population: 11,675 (2011)
- OS grid reference: NZ096629
- Unitary authority: Northumberland
- Ceremonial county: Northumberland
- Region: North East
- Country: England
- Sovereign state: United Kingdom
- Post town: PRUDHOE
- Postcode district: NE42
- Dialling code: 01661
- Police: Northumbria
- Fire: Northumberland
- Ambulance: North East
- UK Parliament: Hexham

Prudhoe (/ˈprʌdə/ PRUD-ə) is a town and civil parish in the south of Northumberland, England. It is 11 miles (18 km) west of Newcastle upon Tyne and situated on a steep, north-facing hill on the south bank of the River Tyne. Prudhoe had a population of 11,675 at the 2011 census, making it the second largest town in the Tyne Valley after Hexham.

Nearby villages include Ovingham, Ovington, Wylam, Stocksfield, Hedley on the Hill and Mickley.

== History ==
The name derives from the Anglo-Saxon personal name Prud (from prūd, meaning 'proud') and hoe or haugh, 'a spur of land'.

There has been a castle at Prudhoe since ancient times, when England was at war with Scotland. The area now known as Castlefields was a fruit orchard, and the Scots were rumoured to have burnt this orchard while attempting to capture Prudhoe Castle. In 1297, Scots led by William Wallace laid waste to Northumberland from Hexham up to the walls of Newcastle, burning Prudhoe and a number of other townsThe castle, originally owned by the d'Umfraville family, then the Percys and now English Heritage, is considered to be the only medieval fortification in Northumberland never to have been captured by the Scots.

In 1914, a Territorial Army drill hall was developed on Swalwell Close, which housed a company of the 4th Battalion of the Northumberland Fusiliers. The drill hall site (now disused) was scheduled to be redeveloped from 2018, with the scheme further delayed and complicated by the jailing of the owner for eight years in 2021.

During the Cold War, there was a Royal Observer Corps Underground Monitoring Post opposite Highfield Park; the surface features have since been demolished. It was one of approximately 1,563 similar underground monitoring posts built all across the UK during the Cold War to monitor the effects of a nuclear strike. They were operated by the Royal Observer Corps (ROC), mostly civilian volunteers, who worked in groups of three inside the posts. Prudhoe ROC post was opened in June 1962 and closed in September 1991 after the collapse of the Soviet Union, which saw the end of the Cold War.

== Governance ==
Local government services for Prudhoe are provided by Northumberland County Council, a unitary authority. Electorally, the town is located within the parliamentary constituency of Hexham and is therefore represented by Joe Morris of the Labour Party in the House of Commons.

For Northumberland County Council elections, the civil parish is divided into three electoral divisions: Prudhoe North (represented by Labour), Prudhoe South (Conservative) and Stocksfield and Broomshaugh (Independent). Ward boundary recommendations propose redrawing Prudhoe's electoral map into Prudhoe West, Prudhoe South and Prudhoe North and Wylam divisions.

Prudhoe Town Council meets at The Spetchells Centre, Front Street, in the centre of town.

== Geography ==
The town of Prudhoe is built on a steep, north-facing hill, which reaches elevations exceeding 200 metres up on the Prudhoe and Mickley Moors. The south of the parish is largely rural and comprises both farmland and forest. The castle overlooks a gentle bend in the River Tyne. To the south of Prudhoe is Hedley on the Hill and then Ebchester over the County Durham border. Prudhoe is also home to Hagg Bank, a steep hill which winds down to Hagg Bank Farm on the riverside. The civil parish borders Tyne and Wear (as well as historic County Durham) over Stanley Burn in the east of town.

=== Climate ===
Climate data for Albemarle (1991-2020 averages)
Month	Jan	Feb	Mar	Apr	May	Jun	Jul	Aug	Sep	Oct	Nov	Dec	Year
Mean daily maximum °C (°F)	6.1 (43.0)	6.8 (44.2)	9.0 (48.2)	11.5 (52.7)	14.4 (57.9)	17.0 (62.6)	19.3 (66.7)	18.9 (66.0)	16.5 (61.7)	12.6 (54.7)	8.9 (48.0)	6.4 (43.5)	12.3 (54.1)
Mean daily minimum °C (°F)	0.9 (33.6)	1.0 (33.8)	1.9 (35.4)	3.5 (38.3)	5.9 (42.6)	8.7 (47.7)	10.7 (51.3)	10.7 (51.3)	8.8 (47.8)	6.1 (43.0)	3.3 (37.9)	1.0 (33.8)	5.2 (41.4)
Average precipitation mm (inches)	52.8 (2.08)	49.0 (1.93)	48.5 (1.91)	52.9 (2.08)	50.5 (1.99)	70.5 (2.78)	69.3 (2.73)	73.1 (2.88)	66.4 (2.61)	71.0 (2.80)	75.8 (2.98)	64.2 (2.53)	744 (29.3)
Average precipitation days (≥ 1.0 mm)	11.9	10.4	10.2	9.6	9.5	10.6	10.7	11.1	10.1	13.4	13.4	13.2	134.1
Source: Met Office

== Industry ==
Prudhoe was once a coal mining town. There is still evidence of the old coal mine at West Wylam, signified by a miner's cart when driving into Castlefields up Cockshot Dean. The cart was found in brambles nearby by a former mine employee. This was the site of West Wylam Colliery. The main drift entrance of the colliery is buried under the modern road.

The town has an industrial estate, called Low Prudhoe that lies alongside the A695 road, which now bypasses the town to the north. There are a few factories and several smaller businesses straddling the side of this road.

Prudhoe has one large factory operated by Essity. Originally built by Kimberly-Clark, the mill was bought by SCA after the Monopolies Commission forced Kimberly-Clark to sell. The factory consists of the mill, housing the paper machines, converting lines, warehousing and Unifibres and makes paper products such as tissues. The site where SCA stands was first used by ICI for producing agricultural fertiliser (sulfate and ammonium sulfate). In 1963 this plant closed leaving behind the "Spetchells" chalk hills – heaps of waste product which were subsequently turfed over. After ICI closed, the site was owned by Cleveland Engineering, which produced automobile parts, and following its closure in 1969 Kimberly-Clark opened.

== Health facility ==
Once home to a 1200-patient large mental health hospital based on the former Prudhoe Hall site, Prudhoe was then home to a 40-bed specialist mental health facility for children and young people, Ferndene, which is operated by Cumbria Northumberland Tyne and Wear NHS Foundation Trust.

== Landmarks ==
=== Prudhoe Castle ===
Prudhoe Castle is a Norman castle, which was for a long time involved in the border wars between England and Scotland. It was built by the d'Umfraville family: the Norman Sir Robert de Umfraville was granted the freedom of Redesdale by William the Conqueror. For much of its history the castle was owned by the Percy family. It is now run by English Heritage. The castle is unique in being the only medieval defensive fortification in the whole of Northumbria to avoid capture by the Scots.

The majority of the surviving building work dates from the 12th century, although the site of Prudhoe Castle has strong Norman origins. In the 14th/15th centuries, the tower was extended to provide an extra level with turrets. Only the southwest turret survives to this day.

=== Important religious sites ===
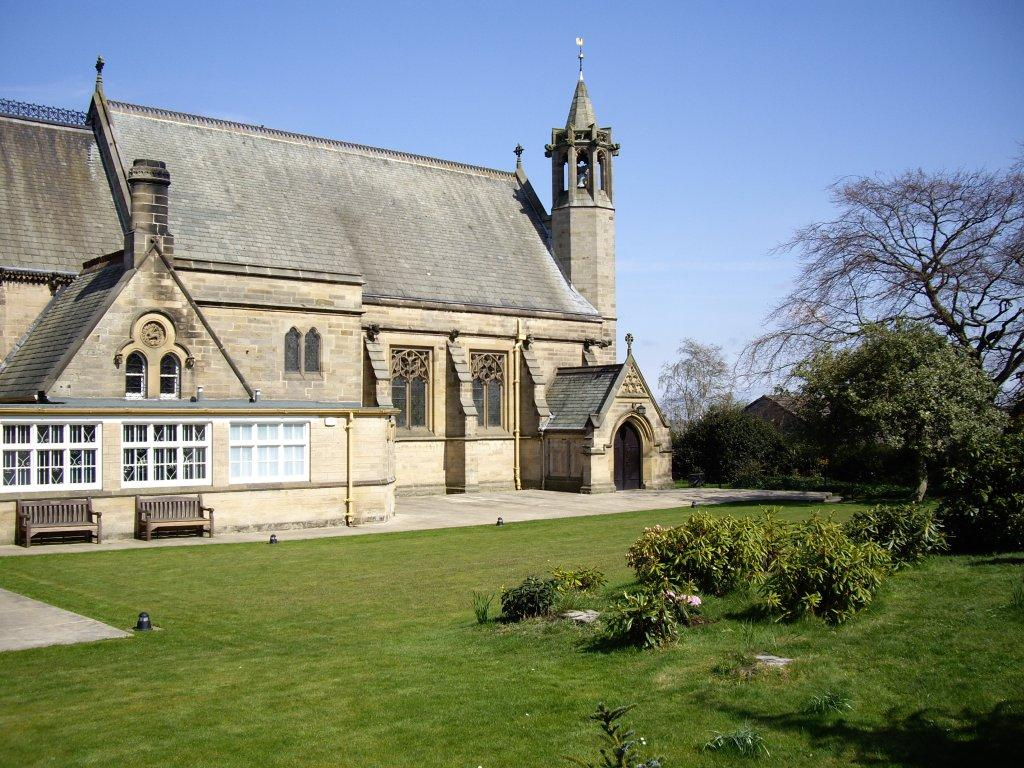
Our Lady and St Cuthbert – the church that moved

Prudhoe Hall (built 1868–70) and the Catholic Church of Our Lady and St Cuthbert in Prudhoe (built 1890–91, but incorporating the Cottier windows from an earlier smaller chapel built 1868–70) have some of Daniel Cottier's earliest stained glass. Matthew Liddell presumably commissioned Cottier to design the stained glass windows in both the main hall and the original chapel because his architect, Archibald Dunn, was impressed by the fact that Cottier had recently won a prize for the superb harmony of colours in his armorial window at the 1867 Paris International Exhibition. Indeed, Daniel Cottier has referred to his Paris prize in the graphite border of the large window in the main hall of Prudhoe Hall.

The stained glass in the small original chapel, which was opened on 19 October 1870, was eventually incorporated in the enlarged church of 1891 and then subsequently moved again a mile into the town of Prudhoe in 1904–05, when the Liddell family moved away from the area and could no longer support the Catholic mission, which Matthew Liddell had begun in 1870. The black-and-white photographs of the first chapel at Prudhoe Hall in Fr Paul Zielinski's book, The Church that Moved, show exactly the same windows containing the Cottier glass that have been retained in the larger church that replaced it. This means that the Cottier windows have been moved twice from their original site, and this would explain the necessity for so much extra remedial lead-work within some of the panes of glass, presumably repairing damage caused by two removals and two re-installations.

The small windows at Prudhoe Hall depicting idyllic naturalistic scenes of a rising sun over a river are especially beautiful, and seem to have a strong similarity to the work of Louis Comfort Tiffany. Made in about 1870, they pre-date by ten years or more the collaboration between Cottier and Tiffany in the 1880s in America. The swaying reeds in particular would seem to suggest that Cottier may well have been a significant influence on Tiffany before Tiffany returned the compliment, and Cottier brought some of his ideas back into his own artistic creations in Scotland.

There is a memorial stone to John Wesley set in a low wall on South Road (outside the former Prudhoe Council offices), the former main street of the town, commemorating his visits to the town.

Historically, the parish church for Prudhoe was across the river at Ovingham. Since 1880, however, it has been served by the Church of St Mary Magdalene off Front Street.

=== West Wylam ===
Towards the eastern edge of Prudhoe is West Wylam, an area of largely social housing. It is home to an elderly care home, Prudhoe Town AFC, a small row of takeaways as well as a local NISA store and Eastwood Park; where several local football teams play their league games. The area also has allotments and Adderlane First School, which was opened in 1978. The last church on the estate, West Wylam Ebenezer Methodist Church, closed in 2014.

== Transport ==
=== Road ===
Prudhoe is linked to Newcastle upon Tyne and the A1 by the A695 which used to pass through the centre of the town along Front Street. The A695 road now bypasses the town to the north through the industrial estate at Low Prudhoe. The better transport links of the new bypass have allowed the industrial estate to expand alongside the new road to the east, named Princess Way after the royal who opened SCA Hygiene.

Northumberland County Council sought a significant landmark feature adjacent to the new bypass, and commissioned the Prudhoe Badger under their 'percent for art' policy. The sculpture is 30m long, and was constructed with the help of drystone wallers in stone and marble. It was designed to integrate with the rural environment, create awareness about ecology and provide a link with the nearby Countryside Centre. The badger sculpture is sited adjacent to the roundabout on the A695 road at Low Prudhoe.

=== Railway ===
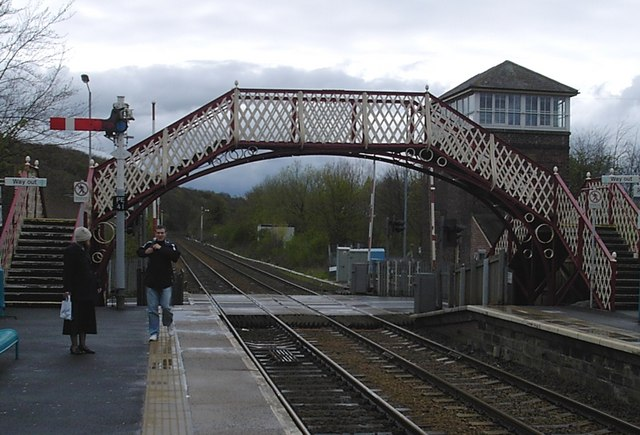
Prudhoe railway station

The town is served by Prudhoe railway station on the Newcastle and Carlisle Railway, also known as the Tyne Valley Line. The line was opened in 1838, and links the city of Newcastle upon Tyne with Carlisle. The line follows the course of the River Tyne through Northumberland. Passenger services on the Tyne Valley Line are operated by Northern only after the May 2022 timetable change. The line is also used for freight. The next railway stations are those at Wylam and Stocksfield.

=== Bus ===
The town has direct bus links to Newcastle, Hexham and the MetroCentre.

== Media ==
Local news and television programmes are provided by BBC North East and Cumbria and ITV Tyne Tees. Television signals are received from the Pontop Pike TV transmitter and one of the two relay transmitters (Newton and Fenham).

Local radio stations are BBC Radio Newcastle, Heart North East, Capital North East, Smooth Radio North East, Greatest Hits Radio North East, Hits Radio North East, Koast Radio and Radio Prudhoe, a community based station.

The town is served by the local newspapers the Hexham Courant and Chronicle Extra.

== Education ==
First schools:

- Prudhoe Castle First School.
- Prudhoe West First Academy (which celebrated its 100-year anniversary in 2009).
- St Matthew's Catholic Primary.

Middle schools:

- Highfield Middle School.
- Ovingham Middle School.
- Eastwood Middle School (closed in 2006 and is now home of Prudhoe Youth Football Club)

High schools:

- Prudhoe Community High School.

== Religious sites ==
Prudhoe is home to a number of churches, including:

- The Parish Church of Saint Mary Magdalene (Church of England)
- Prudhoe Methodist Church
- Our Lady and Saint Cuthbert's Catholic Church
- The Gate Church Prudhoe (formerly Prudhoe Community Church)
- Edgewell Christian Centre

== Sport ==
Prudhoe has its own senior football club, Prudhoe Town AFC, which formerly resided at Kimberley Park, West Wylam.

== Recreation ==
Tyne Riverside Country Park in Low Prudhoe lies on the southern bank of the River Tyne. The park includes the artificial chalk hills known as the "Spetchells" which have attracted some natural chalk-loving flora and fauna not normally found in the region. It has been proposed that they be made 'sites of scientific interest'. A public bridleway runs from the country park to Hagg Bank, over the Points Bridge to Wylam. Now forming a traffic-free part of National Cycle Network Route 72, it runs on the bed of a disused railway line to Newburn, Tyne and Wear, Newcastle upon Tyne, and on to the coast at Tynemouth.

Prudhoe Town Football Club are currently in the Wearside Football League, in the eleventh tier of the English football league system. The future of the club has recently been in doubt following the loss of its ground, Kimberley Park, in West Wylam.

Prudhoe Waterworld provides swimming and other fitness activities and is the home of Prudhoe Millennium Tapestry.

The town has a skatepark, Highfield Park, which is located at the top of Prudhoe.

== Public services ==
Prudhoe is home to the North East Ferret Rescue, which helps unwanted and abandoned ferrets. It is the only active ferret rescue in the North East of England. See https://web.archive.org/web/20180718132105/http://www.northeastferretrescue.co.uk/

== Notable people ==
- Ben Alnwick, footballer (goalkeeper), who played for Bolton Wanderers, brother of Jak Alnwick, born in Prudhoe
- Jak Alnwick, footballer (goalkeeper), who, as of October 2026, plays for Huddersfield Town, brother of Ben Alnwick, born in Prudhoe
- Gaz Beadle, star of reality TV show Geordie Shore from 2011 to 2017
- John Callender – (1903–1980), English footballer, born at West Wylam
- George Honeyman, footballer (midfielder), who as of October 2026, plays for Blackpool, was born in Prudhoe
- Steven Savile, English science fiction and fantasy novelist and game writer, lived in Prudhoe between 1985–1991
- Bob Stokoe (1930–2004), 1973 F.A. Cup-winning manager of Sunderland A.F.C., born in Mickley, Prudhoe
- Henry Travers (1874–1965), Oscar-nominated character actor best known as the angel Clarence from It's a Wonderful Life. He was born in Prudhoe, but grew up in Berwick-upon-Tweed.

== Popular culture ==
Prudhoe is the hometown of Ruth Archer and her mother Heather Pritchard, in the long-running BBC radio serial The Archers.

== International links ==
Prudhoe is twinned with Mitry-Mory, near Paris, France. Evidence of this partnership is seen on signs when entering the town and there are several murals depicting the twinning.

Prudhoe Bay, an area of northern Alaska containing the largest oil field in the US is named indirectly after Prudhoe. The explorer, John Franklin, who discovered the area, named it after his good friend, Baron Prudhoe of Prudhoe.

== See also ==
- Prudhoe Castle

== Sources ==
- Grundy, John (2022). History of Northumberland. Newcastle upon Tyne: Tyne Bridge Publishing. ISBN 9781838280970.
- Middlebrook, Sydney (1968). Newcastle upon Tyne. Its Growth and Achievement. Wakefield: S.R. Publishers ltd.
