= Earl of Angus =

Scottish peerage

The flag of the present County of Angus, showing the arms of the early mormaers, the Ogilvys, the Umfravilles, the Stewarts of Bonkyll, and the Douglases

The Mormaer or Earl of Angus was the ruler of the medieval Scottish province of Angus. The title, in the Peerage of Scotland, is held by the Duke of Hamilton, and is used as a courtesy title for the eldest son of the Duke's eldest son.

== History ==
Arms of Ogilvy, Sheriffs of Angus (1163), Earls of Airlie (from 1593)

Arms of de Umfreville, Earls of Angus (from 1246)

Arms of Stewart, Earls of Angus (from 1329)

=== Mormaers ===
Angus is one of the oldest attested mormaerdoms, with the earliest attested mormaer, Dubacan of Angus, known to have lived in the early 10th century, as recorded in the Chronicle of the Kings of Alba. Angus was, according to the doubtful and legendary text de Situ Albanie, one of the seven original mormaerdoms of the Pictish kingdom of Alba, said to have been occupied by seven brothers, of whom Angus (Oengus) was the eldest. Despite this, the mormaers of Angus are among the most obscure of all. After the death of Mormaer Maol Chaluim, in probably about 1240, the mormaerdom passed through the marriage of his daughter Matilda, to the line of the Norman Gilbert de Umfraville.

=== Ogilvy Earls ===
The lands of Clan Ogilvy, in Angus, was ruled by a mormaer; one of the ancient Celtic nobles of Scotland who became the first earls. The title of Moramer of Angus became Earl of Angus. Gillebride, Earl of Angus, received a Barony from King William the Lion in 1163, and bestowed upon his son, Gilbert, the lands of Wester Powrie, Ogilvy, and Kyneithin. The top left quadrant displays the Ogilvy crest; argent, a lion passant, guardant, Gules, crowned with an imperial crown and collared with an open one, Proper.

=== Umfraville Earls ===
Gilbert de Umfraville inherited the earldom while in his minority after his father's death in 1245. Gilbert fought on the English side during the first war of Scottish independence until his death in 1308. His heir, second son Robert, also fought on the side of the English and surrendered to King Robert de Brus during the Battle of Bannockburn in 1314. He was released by Robert and treated with the Scots for peace with England. He was ultimately disinherited of his titles. Robert's heir Gilbert continued attempting to recover the earldom and supported Edward Balliol and other disinherited barons and lords in Scotland.

=== Stewart Earls ===
John Stewart of Bonkyll, Berwickshire, obtained the title Earl of Angus in 1329 in a new line after the forfeiture of the de Umfraville line, though the latter family continued to use the title in England until 1381. This Stewart line ended with Margaret Stewart, countess of Angus in her own right, and widow of Thomas, Earl of Mar.

=== Douglas earls ===
An illicit affair between Margaret Stewart, Countess of Mar and Angus, and her brother in law, William Douglas, 1st Earl of Douglas (married to the sister of her husband), produced George Douglas, 1st Earl of Angus (c. 1380–1403). The Countess secured a charter of her estates for her son, to whom in 1389 the title was granted by King Robert II. He was taken prisoner at Homildon Hill in 1402, and died in captivity in England. Archibald "Bell-the-Cat" (1453–1514) the powerful adversary of James III, was his great-grandson.

William Douglas (1589–1660) 11th Earl of Angus, was created Marquis of Douglas in 1633. He resigned the title of Earl of Angus, having it recreated with the marquessate, so he was the 1st Earl of Angus in the new creation. He outlived his son Archibald Douglas, Earl of Angus (c. 1609–1655), and was succeeded by Archibald's son James Douglas, 2nd Marquess of Douglas (1646–1699). James' son and heir Archibald Douglas was created Duke of Douglas, Marquess of Angus and Abernethy, Viscount of Jedburgh Forest, and Lord Douglas of Bonkill, Prestoun and Robertoun on 10 April 1703. He died without leaving an heir and the titles acquired with the dukedom became extinct. All his other titles devolved to his distant cousin the 7th Duke of Hamilton, whose descendants hold them still.

== Mormaers/early Earls of Angus ==
- ?
- Indrechtach?, fl. early 10th century
- Dubacan, d. 937
- ?
- Cuncar, fl. mid-10th century
- ?
- Gille Brigte, fl. 1150
- Adam, fl. 1189
- Gille Críst, ?–1206
- Donnchadh, 1206–1214
- Maol Choluim, 1214–1240
- Matilda (or Maud)
  - m1. John Comyn, jure uxoris Earl of Angus (d. 1242, without issue)
  - m2. Gilbert de Umfraville, jure uxoris Earl of Angus
- Gilbert de Umfraville, Earl of Angus (Earl: 1246–1307)
- Robert de Umfraville, Earl of Angus (Earl: 1307–c. 1314 (forfeit); d. 1325)
  - Gilbert de Umfraville (d. 1381)

== Earls of Angus, Stewart line (1329) ==
- John Stewart, 1st Earl of Angus (d. 1331)
- Thomas Stewart, 2nd Earl of Angus (d. 1361)
- Margaret Stewart, Countess of Angus and Mar (d. 1417) (resigned the earldom in favour of her son George Douglas in 1389)
  - Thomas, Earl of Mar jure uxoris Earl of Angus (d. 1374)

== Earls of Angus, Douglas line (1389) ==
- George Douglas, 1st Earl of Angus (1378–1402)
- William Douglas, 2nd Earl of Angus (c. 1398–1437)
- James Douglas, 3rd Earl of Angus (1428–1446)
- George Douglas, 4th Earl of Angus (c. 1427–1462)
- Archibald Douglas, 5th Earl of Angus (1453–1514)
  - George Douglas, Master of Angus (1469–1513)
- Archibald Douglas, 6th Earl of Angus (1490–1557)
- David Douglas, 7th Earl of Angus (c. 1515–1558)
- Archibald Douglas, 8th Earl of Angus (1556–1588)
- William Douglas, 9th Earl of Angus (1533–1591)
- William Douglas, 10th Earl of Angus (1552–1611)
- William Douglas, 11th Earl of Angus (1589–1660), (created Marquess of Douglas in 1633, when he resigned the earldom, which was regranted with the marquessate)

== Marquesses of Douglas (1633) ==
Also Lord Abernethy and Jedburgh Forest

(The Earldom of Angus was regranted with the marquessate as a courtesy title, used by the eldest son of the marquess)

- William Douglas, 1st Marquess of Douglas (1589–1660)
- James Douglas, 2nd Marquess of Douglas (1646–1700)
- Archibald Douglas, 3rd Marquess of Douglas (1694–1761) (created Duke of Douglas in 1703)

== Duke of Douglas (1703) ==
Also Marquess of Angus and Abernethy, Viscount of Jedburgh Forest, and Lord Douglas of Bonkill, Prestoun and Robertoun

- Archibald Douglas, 1st Duke of Douglas (1694–1761) (created Duke of Douglas in 1703) (the dukedom became extinct on his death, while the Earldom of Angus, Marquessate of Douglas and other subsidiary titles were inherited by James Hamilton, 7th Duke of Hamilton)

For later earls of Angus and marquesses of Douglas, see the Duke of Hamilton

== Family tree ==
Family tree of the: Earls of Angus, Earls of Avondale, Earls of Douglas, Marquesses of Douglas, Earls of Forfar, Earls of Ormond and Marquesses of Ormond, Earls of Ross and Dukes of Ross

Earl of Angus (Stewart line) and Lord of Bonkyl, 1329
John Stewart d. 1331; 1st Earl of Angus, etc., Lord of Abernethy jure uxoris	William the Hardy; 1243–1298; Lord of Douglas
Thomas Stewart b. before 1331–1361; 2nd Earl of Angus, etc.	Archibald Douglas d. 1333	James Douglas "the Good" c. 1286–1330; Lord of Douglas
Earl of Douglas, 1358
Robert III c. 1337–1406; King of Scotland	Margaret Stewart d. 1417; 3rd Countess of Angus, etc.	William Douglas c. 1323–1384; 1st Earl of Douglas	Archibald Douglas "the Grim" c. 1330 – c. 1400; 3rd Earl of Douglas, Earl of Wigtown, Lord of Galloway, Lord of Douglas, Lord of Bothwell
Earl of Angus transferred from the Stewarts to the Douglasses when Margaret resigned her title in deference to her son, 1389	Earl of Avondale and Lord Balveny, 1437
James I 1394–1437; King of Scotland	Mary Stewart c. 1380–c. 1460	George Douglas; 1380–1430; 1st Earl of Angus, etc.	James Douglas c. 1358–1388; 2nd Earl of Douglas, Earl of Mar	Archibald Douglas "Tyneman" c. 1369–1424; Duke of Touraine, 4th Earl of Douglas, Earl of Wigtown, 13th Lord of Douglas, Lord of Galloway, Lord of Douglas, Lord of Bothwell m. Margaret of Carrick, daughter of Robert III	James Douglas; 1371–1443; 7th Earl of Douglas, 1st Earl of Avondale, etc.
William Douglas; 1398–1437; 2nd Earl of Angus, etc.	Douglases of Drumlanrig	Archibald Douglas c. 1391–1439; Duke of Touraine, 5th Earl of Douglas, Earl of Wigtown, Lord of Galloway, Lord of Douglas, Lord of Bothwell, Lord of Selkirk and Ettrick Forest, Eskdale, Lauderdale, Liddesdale and Annandale, Count of Longueville, Seigneur de Dun-le-roi
Earl of Ormond (Scotland) (1st creation), 1445
James II; 1430–1460; King of Scotland	James Douglas; 1428–1446; 3rd Earl of Angus, etc.	George Douglas c. 1427–1463; 4th Earl of Angus, etc.	William Douglas c. 1424–1440; Duke of Touraine, 6th Earl of Douglas, Earl of Wigtown, Lord of Galloway, Lord of Bothwell, Lord of Selkirk and Ettrick Forest, Eskdale, Lauderdale, and Annandale, Count of Longueville, Seigneur de Dun-le-roi	William Douglas; 1425–1452; 8th Earl of Douglas, 2nd Earl of Avondale, etc.	James Douglas; 1426–1491; 9th Earl of Douglas, 3rd Earl of Avondale, etc.	Hugh Douglas d. 1455; Earl of Ormond
Earldom of Douglas and Earldom of Avondale forfeit, 1491	Eardom of Ormand forfeit, 1455
James III; 1451/1452–1448; King of Scotland	Archibald Douglas c. 1449–1513; 5th Earl of Angus, etc.
Marquess of Ormond (Scotland) (1st creation), 1476; Earl of Ross, 1481; Duke of Ross, 1488
James IV; 1473–1513; King of Scotland	James Stewart; 1476–1504; Duke of Ross, etc.	George Douglas; 1469–1513 styled Master of Angus	William Douglas of Glenbervie; 1473–1513
Dukedom of Ross (1488 creation), Marqessate of Ormond (1st creation) and Earldom of Ross (1481 creation) extinct, 1504
Duke of Ross (2nd creation), 1514
James V 1512–1542; King of Scotland	Alexander Stewart; 1514–1515; Duke of Ross	Archibald Douglas; 1490–1557; 6th Earl of Angus, etc.	George Douglas of Pittendreich d. 1552	Archibald Douglas of Glenbervie; 1513–1570
Dukedom of Ross (2nd creation) extinct, 1515	Earl of Ross (1565 creation)
Mary; 1542–1587; Queen of Scotland	Henry Stuart; 1546–1567; Duke of Albany, 1st Earl of Ross, Lord Darnley, Lord Ardmannoch	David Douglas c. 1515–1558; 7th Earl of Angus, etc.	William Douglas; 1533–1591; 9th Earl of Angus, etc.
James VI and I 1566–1625; 2nd Earl of Ross, later King of Scotland	Archibald Douglas; 1555–1588; 8th Earl of Angus, etc., Earl of Morton	William Douglas; 1553–1611; 10th Earl of Angus, etc.
Earldom of Ross (1565 creation), merged with the crown
Marquess of Ormond (Scotland) (2nd creation), Earl of Ross, and Lord Ardmannoch, 1600	Earldom of Angus (1389 creation) resigned in favor of: Marquess of Douglas, Earl of Angus, Lord Abernethy, Lord Bonkyll and Preston, Lord Abernethy, and Lord Jedburgh Forest, 1633
Elizabeth Stuart; 1596–1662	Charles Stuart; 1600–1649; Marquess of Ormond, etc., Later King Charles I of England and Scotland	William Douglas; 1589–1660; 1st Marquess of Douglas, etc. 11th Earl of Angus, etc. (1389 creation)
Marquessate of Ormand (2nd creation) and Earldom of Ross (1600 creation) merged with the Crown, 1625
Earl of Ormond (Scotland) (2nd creation), 1651
Sophia of Hanover; 1630–1714	Archibald Douglas; 1609–1655; 1st Earl of Ormond
Earl of Forfar (1st creation), 1661
King George I 1660–1727	James Douglas c. 1646–1700; 2nd Marquess of Douglas, etc.	Archibald Douglas; 1653–1712; 2nd Earl of Ormond, 1st Earl of Forfar
Duke of Douglas, Marquess of Angus and Abernethy, Viscount of Jedburgh Forest, Lord Douglas of Bonkill, Prestoun, and Robertoun, 1703
King George II; 1683–1760	Archibald Douglas; 1694–1761; 1st Duke of Douglas, etc., 3rd Marquess of Douglas, etc.	Archibald Douglas; 1692–1715; 3rd Earl of Ormond, 2nd Earl of Forfar
Dukedom of Douglas, marquessate of Angus and Abernethy, and viscountcy of Jedburgh Forest, lordship Douglas of Bonkill, Prestoun, and Robertoun extinct, 1761; Marquessate of Douglas, earldom of Angus, and lordship of Abernethy and Jedburgh Forest passed to James Hamilton, 7th Duke of Hamilton	Earldoms of Ormond and Forfar extinct, 1715
Frederick; 1707–1751; Prince of Wales
King George III; 1683–1760
Edward Augustus; 1767–1820; Duke of Kent and Strathearn
Queen Victoria; 1819–1901
King Edward VII; 1841–1910
Duke of Clarence and Avondale and Earl of Athlone, 1890
Prince Albert Victor; 1864–1892; Duke of Clarence and Avondale, etc.	King George V 1865–1936
Dukedom of Clarence and Avondale and Earldom of Athlone extinct, 1892
King George VI; 1895–1952
Queen Elizabeth II; 1926–2022
Earl of Forfar (2nd creation), 2019
Prince Edward b. 1964; Duke of Edinburgh, Earl of Forfar

== Bibliography ==
- Roberts, John L., Lost Kingdoms: Celtic Scotland in the Middle Ages, (Edinburgh, 1997), pp. 53–4
