= Mormaer =

Scottish noble title

In early medieval Scotland, a mormaer was the Gaelic name for a regional or provincial ruler, theoretically second only to the King of Scots, and the senior of a Toísech (chieftain). Mormaers were equivalent to English earls or Continental counts, and the term is often translated into English as 'earl'.

== Name ==
Mormaer (pl. mormaír) and earl were respectively the Gaelic and Scots words used for the position also referred to in Latin as comes (pl. comites), which originally meant "companion". That the words mormaer and comes were equivalent can be seen in the case of Ruadrí, Earl of Mar, who is described as mormaer when listed as a witness in a document recorded in the Gaelic language in 1130 or 1131, and as comes in a charter recorded in Latin between 1127 and 1131. The word earl was increasingly used in place of mormaer as Scots replaced Gaelic as the dominant vernacular language between the late 12th and late 13th centuries, and the word Earl was exclusively used within Scotland to translate comes in the later Middle Ages as Scots became the language of record. This gradual change in language use from Gaelic to Scots did not mean that earl was a new title, however, and it was unrelated to changes in the role of the comes that took place over the same time-period.

The word mormaer may represent a survival of a Pictish compound form, as despite being a Gaelic form it was used only to refer to nobles of the former Pictish areas of the Kingdom of Alba, and was never used to refer to Ireland. As late as the 15th century Irish sources were using the word mormaer for Scottish earls, instead of the word iarla they used for Irish or English earls.

The second element of mormaer comes from the Gaelic or Pictish maer meaning "steward", but the first element could be either "great" (Gaelic mór or Pictish már), or a genitive form of the word for "sea" (Gaelic moro or Pictish mor). Mormaer could therefore mean either "great steward" or "sea steward".

== History ==
=== Origins ===
The office of mormaer is first mentioned in the context of the Battle of Corbridge in 918, where the Annals of Ulster describe how the men of the Kingdom of Alba "did not lose a king or mormaer". Another three mormaers are named, though without their provinces being specified, in the Annals of Tigernach, which listed them as fighting in Ireland in 976. The first individual named mormaer was Dubacan of Angus, one of the companions of Amlaib, the son of King Causantín II (Constantine II). Dubacan's death at the Battle of Brunanburh in 937 is recorded in the Chronicle of the Kings of Alba, where he is described as Mormaer of Angus (Gaelic: Mormair Oengusa, or Mormaer Óengus), the first mormaer to be documented in connection to a specific province. Domnall mac Eimín is described as Mormaer of Mar in the Annals of Ulster recording his death at the Battle of Clontarf in 1014.

By the 10th century the mormaer was established as the leading figure of each of the provinces of the Kingdom of Alba. This remained their primary role, with military, fiscal and judicial elements, until the late 12th century. The mormaer was responsible for raising and leading the army of the province, offered protection to those within the province beyond that afforded by their kin-groups, heard and decided upon accusations of theft, and had the right to collect tribute (càin) from settlements within the province as a source of revenue for their activities. Although the mormaer was the ultimate head of the provincial community and a focal point of its power, his authority was not absolute and could only be exercised in cooperation with other powerful local figures, including thanes, bishops and tòiseach, the leaders of powerful local kin-groups. The role of mormaer at this time does not appear to have been hereditary: although sons did sometimes succeed their fathers, often they did not, and the position seems to have been occupied by the most powerful member of the most powerful kin-group within a province, sometimes alternating between different branches of a family or switching between different kin-groups.

The Leges inter Brettos et Scottos – a law code reflecting customs in the Kingdom of Alba in the 10th or 11th centuries – lists socio-legal ranks within society and their cro, the payments due in kine to the kin of a victim of that rank in the event of a killing. A mormaer is listed at 150 kine, behind a king at 1,000 kine and equal to the value of a king's son, but only 50% higher than that of a thane at 100 kine. While this implies that a mormaer was behind only the King of Scots in rank, it also shows that they were closer in status to a thane than to a king, and that both mormaer and thane were considered to be a noble rank, neither were simply royal officials.

Despite being the leading power within their province, the mormaer did not necessarily hold a large proportion of the land within the province in their own right: land was also held by the King, was granted out by the King to secular vassals, or was held by large religious foundations or other powerful lords. Land held by a mormaer could derive either from their status as mormaer, or from their role of leader of their own kin-group. In Latin the mormaer's provincia – the broad regional division of the kingdom that the mormaer led – was distinguished from his comitatus – the land he controlled directly.

=== Territorial earldoms ===
The role of the mormaer changed dramatically over the course of the late 12th century, and by the early 13th century the position had evolved into one that was inherited, normally through the male line, and whose power was largely limited to a territorial "earldom", managed and exploited in a manner similar to that of other lords, and not coterminous with the province of the same name. The 13th century also saw the Scots term earl increasingly used at the expense of the Gaelic term mormaer, as Scots gradually replaced Gaelic as the dominant vernacular language.

By 1221 mormaers held their earldom from the King and were not permitted to enter the land of any other lord. An exception was made for the Earl of Fife, but this right was expressly separated from his role as mormaer, being held "not as an earl but as the king’s third maer of Fife". The rise of patrilinear inheritance meant that succession to mormaership became linear and stable; a mormaer's estates, previously split between those he controlled as head of a kindred and those controlled in his capacity as mormaer, came to be viewed as a single entity; and land rather than kinship became the main determinant of secular power. The proportion of a province directly controlled by a mormaer could vary considerably: by 1286 for example, the Earldom of Atholl covered most of Atholl, while the Earldom of Angus covered only a small proportion of Angus.

The earliest mormaers of each province are generally only hazily, if at all, known until the 12th century, by which time mormaer is being referred to in Latin documents as comes. Prior to the 12th century, there were four 'ancient' mormaer dynasties: Cataidh/Caithness, Charraig/Carrick, Dunbarra/Dunbar and Moireabh/Moray. After the 12th century, eight other dynasties are known to be hereditary, continuous and no longer fragmentary.

== Role ==
A mormaerdom was not simply a regional lordship, it was a regional lordship with official comital rank. This is why other lordships, many of them more powerful, such as those of lords of Galloway, Argyll and Innse Gall, are not, and were not, called mormaerdoms or earldoms.

== List of mormaers ==
This map pertains to the Scotland of the reign of Alexander II. The map is a rough guide only, and not intended to be 100% accurate.

This list does not include Orkney, which was a Norwegian Earldom, and became ruled by Scotland in the 15th century. Sutherland might be included, but it was created only late (circa 1230), and for a possibly foreign family (see Earl of Sutherland)

1. Mormaerdom of Angus
2. Mormaerdom of Atholl
3. Mormaerdom of Buchan
4. Mormaerdom of Caithness, See Earl of Orkney
5. For Mormaerdom of Carrick, See Earl of Carrick
6. For the Anglo-Scottish Mormaerdom of Dunbar/Lothian, See Earl of Dunbar
7. Mormaerdom of Fife
8. Mormaerdom of Lennox
9. Mormaerdom of Mar
10. ? Mormaerdom of Mearns
11. Mormaerdom of Menteith
12. Mormaerdom/Kingdom of Moray
13. Mormaerdom of Ross
14. Mormaerdom of Strathearn

== Bibliography ==
- Anderson, Alan Orr, Early Sources of Scottish History: AD 500–1286, 2 Vols, (Edinburgh, 1922)
- Barrow, G.W.S., The Kingdom of the Scots, (Edinburgh, 2003)
- Broun, Dauvit, "Mormaer," in J. Cannon (ed.) The Oxford Companion to British History, (Oxford, 1997)
- Broun, Dauvit (2015). "Statehood and lordship in 'Scotland' before the midtwelfth century". Innes Review. 66 (1): 1–71. doi:10.3366/inr.2015.0084.
- Lynch, Michael (1992). Scotland: A New History. London: Pimlico. ISBN 9780712698931.
- Roberts, John L., Lost Kingdoms: Celtic Scotland in the Middle Ages, (Edinburgh, 1997)
- Taylor, Alice (2016). The Shape of the State in Medieval Scotland, 1124–1290. Oxford: Oxford University Press. ISBN 9780198749202.
- Woolf, Alex (2007). From Pictland to Alba 789–1070. Edinburgh: Edinburgh University Press. ISBN 9780748612345.
