= Leadgate, Cumbria =

Hamlet in Cumbria, England

Coordinates: 54.788°N 2.456°W

Leadgate
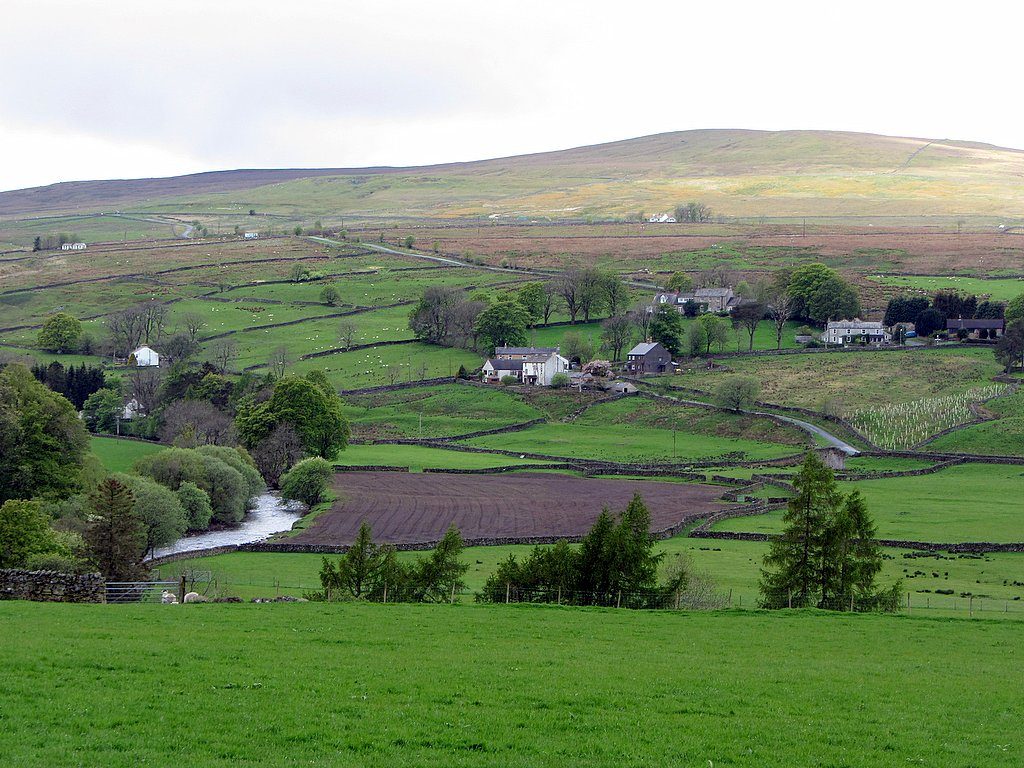
- Leadgate above Black Burn

- Location in Eden, Cumbria Location within Cumbria
- OS grid reference: NY706437
- Civil parish: Alston Moor
- Unitary authority: Westmorland and Furness
- Ceremonial county: Cumbria
- Region: North West
- Country: England
- Sovereign state: United Kingdom
- Post town: ALSTON
- Postcode district: CA9
- Dialling code: 01434
- Police: Cumbria
- Fire: Cumbria
- Ambulance: North West
- UK Parliament: Penrith and Solway

Leadgate is a small hamlet located at the foot of Hartside Fell between the town of Alston and the village of Garrigill in the parish of Alston Moor in Cumbria, England.

== Geography ==
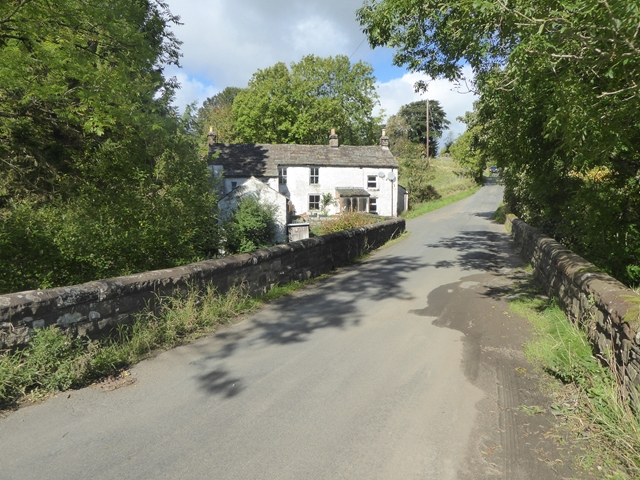
Blackburn Mill

Leadgate is on the Black Burn upstream of its confluence with the South Tyne river. It was the location of the earliest named mill on Alston Moor, referred to as Blackburn Mill in 1590, situated on the Black Burn beck and still shown as a corn mill on the 1861 1:2500 scale Ordnance Survey map.

Hartside Fell is a prominent feature of the area. The cafe on the top of Hartside Pass, 4 miles (6.4 km) west of the hamlet, claimed to be the highest cafe in England at 1,886 feet (575 m). The cafe burnt down in 2018, with a replacement being granted planning permission in 2024.

== History ==
=== Mining ===
Upstream from Leadgate is the site of the Rotherhopefell lead and fluorspar mines and ore works. According to the Historic England listing, "In 1907 the mine was taken over by the Vieille Montagne Company which rebuilt the Low Level ore processing plant in 1912. ... The Vieille Montagne works is the best preserved mechanised ore dressing plant known nationally."

=== 1985 mid-air collision ===
On Monday 7 October 1985, two Jaguars collided at Hartside Pass from 6 Sqn at RAF Coltishall. XX731 was piloted by Flying Officer Steve Friday, who ejected, who was found at the A689 at Slaggyford, and was taken to Cumberland Infirmary. XX728 was piloted by Flt Lt Leonard Stovin, who was killed.
