= Allot =

Allot may refer to:

- Allotment, the act of distributing
- Allot Ltd., a company based in Hod HaSharon, Israel
- Allot (surname)

== See also ==
- Alot (disambiguation)
- Allott (surname)
