= Bayles, Cumbria =

Hamlet near Alston in Cumbria, England

Coordinates: 54°47′58″N 2°27′25″W

Bayles
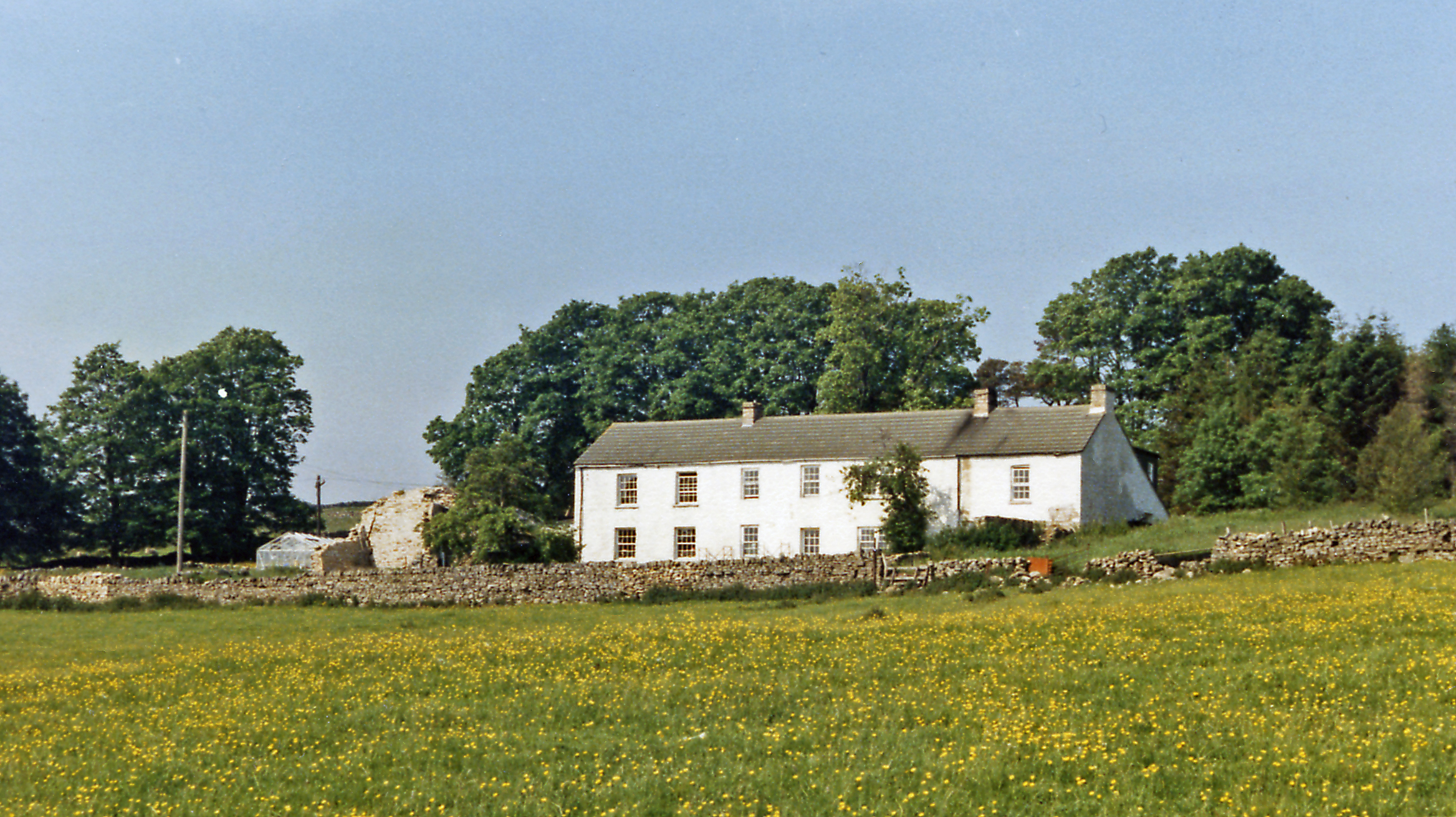
- High Fell Farm Hotel, Bayles

- Location in Eden, Cumbria Location within Cumbria
- OS grid reference: NY707450
- Civil parish: Alston Moor
- Unitary authority: Westmorland and Furness
- Ceremonial county: Cumbria
- Region: North West
- Country: England
- Sovereign state: United Kingdom
- Post town: ALSTON
- Postcode district: CA9
- Dialling code: 01434
- Police: Cumbria
- Fire: Cumbria
- Ambulance: North West
- UK Parliament: Penrith and Solway

Bayles is a hamlet near Alston in Cumbria, England.
