= Alot =

Alot or A Lot may refer to:

- "A Lot", 2018 21 Savage song
- Alot, Madhya Pradesh, India
- Alot, imaginary creature in Hyperbole and a Half by Allie Brosh
- Alot, store formerly known as Staples Argentina

== See also ==
- Allot (disambiguation)
- Allott (surname)
- Lot (disambiguation)
