= Samuel King's School =

Location
- Church Road; Alston; Cumbria, CA9 3QU; England
- Coordinates: 54.81087°N 2.44023°W

Information
- Type: Foundation school
- Local authority: Westmorland and Furness
- Department for Education URN: 112378 Tables
- Ofsted: Reports
- Headteacher: Ian Johnson
- Gender: Mixed
- Age: 11 to 16
- Website: https://alstonmoorfederation.org.uk/schools/samuel-king-s-school

Samuel King's School is a mixed secondary school located in Alston in the English county of Cumbria. As of 2017 it had 73 students on roll. It is a comprehensive foundation school administered by Westmorland and Furness Council. The schools serves the population of Alston, as well as the wider area of Alston Moor.

The current headteacher is Ian Johnson, who was appointed in 2012.

Samuel King's School offers GCSEs and OCR Nationals as programmes of study for pupils. The school also offers some of its courses via distance learning.
