= Garrigill =

Village in Cumbria, England

Coordinates: 54.767°N 2.397°W

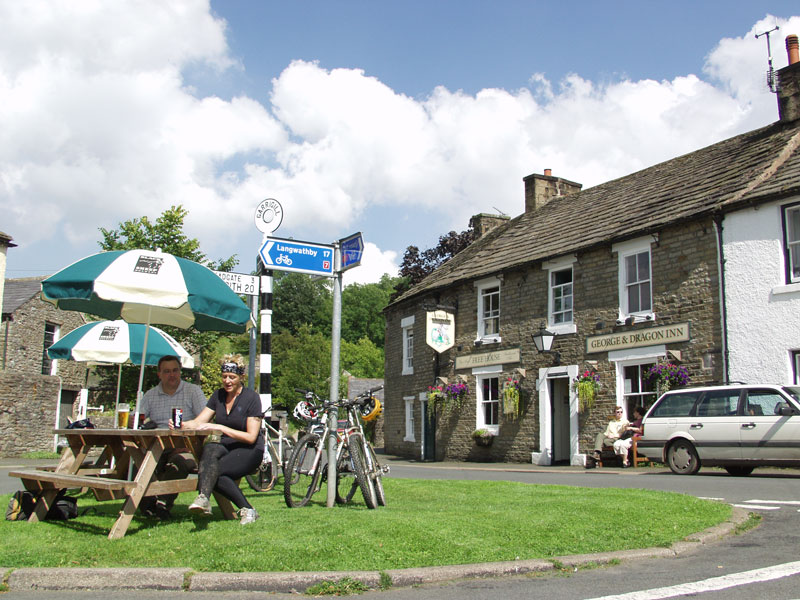
- Garrigill Village Green

- Location in Eden, Cumbria Location within Cumbria
- OS grid reference: NY745415
- Civil parish: Alston Moor
- Unitary authority: Westmorland and Furness
- Ceremonial county: Cumbria
- Region: North West
- Country: England
- Sovereign state: United Kingdom
- Post town: ALSTON
- Postcode district: CA9
- Dialling code: 01434
- Police: Cumbria
- Fire: Cumbria
- Ambulance: North West
- UK Parliament: Penrith and Solway

Garrigill, Cumbria is a small village in the North Pennine region of the UK, situated on the banks and close to the source of the River South Tyne. Historically part of Cumberland, today it is within the Garrigill ward of the civil parish of Alston Moor within Westmorland and Furness. In 1870-72 the chapelry had a population of 1447.

The village's name should not be confused with the hamlet of Galligill in the Nent valley, also within Alston Moor.

The village's former name is Garrigill-Gate and it was earlier known as Gerard's Gill. (Gill is a Norse word for a steep-sided valley).

At its peak Garrigill was home to 1,000 people, mainly employed in the lead mining industry; now its population numbers less than 200. While villagers were at one time mainly employed in local livestock farming, these days the population is fairly evenly divided between those in local employment, the self-employed and retirees. Garrigill Post Office is a traditional village store which has not changed substantially since the 1950s and is an attraction to many visitors, although at one time the village had four shops including a Co-op store.

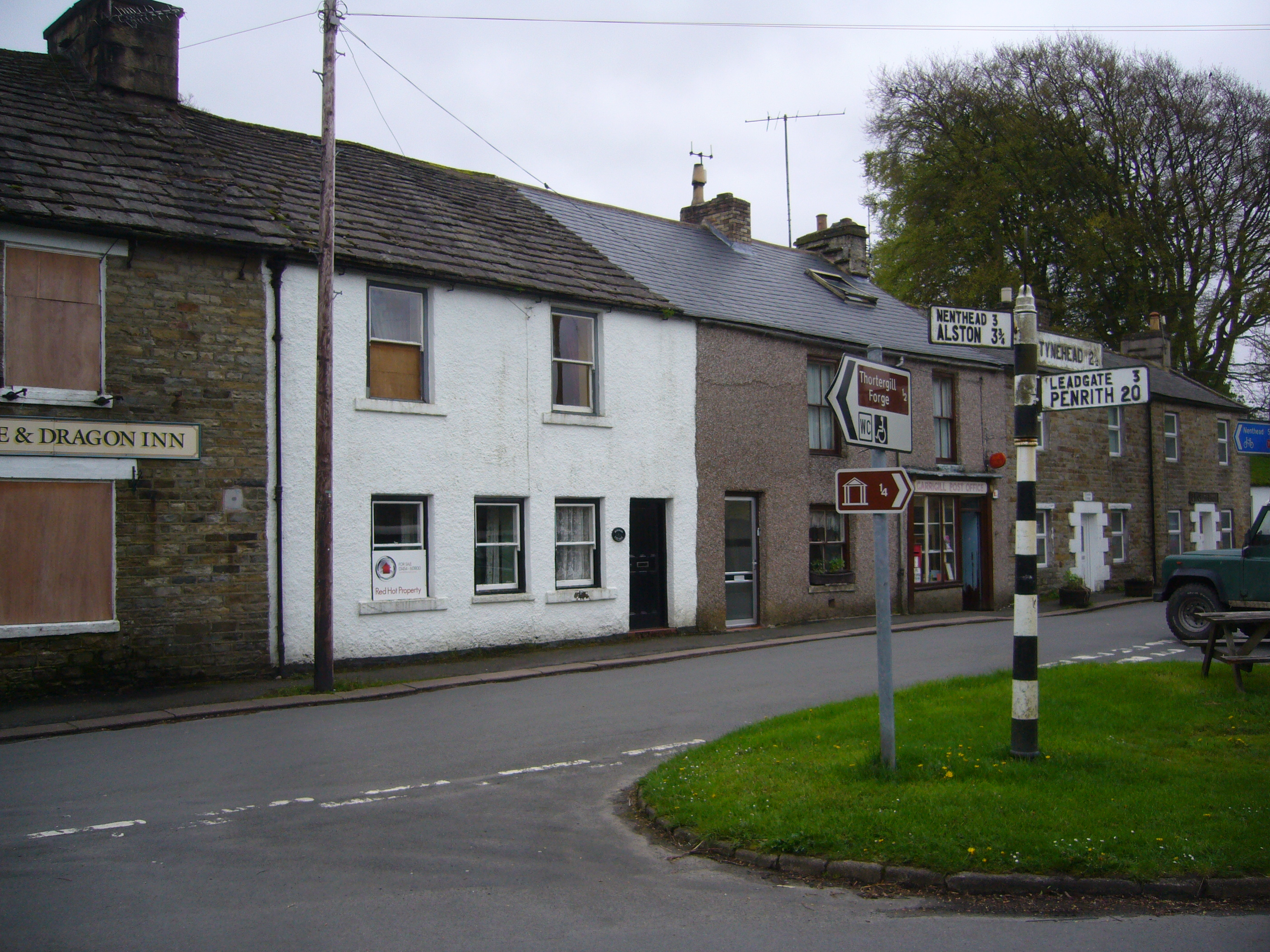
View of row of houses including the Post Office. The boarded-up pub 'The George and Dragon' on the left.

For many years there has been one pub in the village, the 'George & Dragon', but this was closed from September 2009 to December 2010 and again from November 2013 to 3 April 2015. It subsequently closed again and re-opened on 25 August 2017. Before the mid-20th century there was a second pub, The Old Fox, next to the church.

The centre of the village is the green which the post office and George & Dragon overlook with the church and village hall nearby, but at either end of the village proper are the areas of Gatefoot and Gatehead, whilst on the village's outskirts are the settlements of Beldy, Crossgill, Loaning (pronounced Lonnin') Head and Ashgillside. There are two water pumps in the village, one on the green and one (which still works) by the bridge.

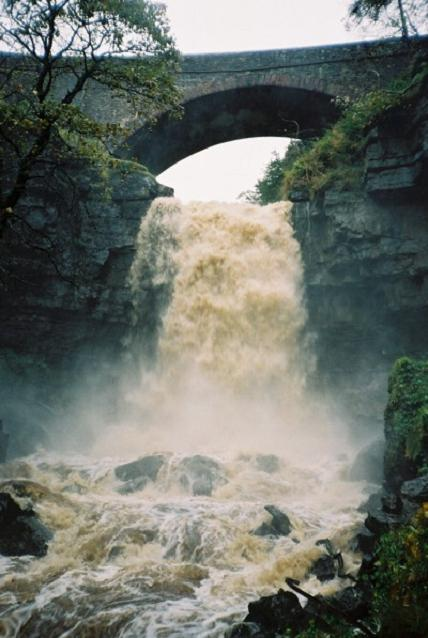
Ashgill Force in flood

At Ashgillside and Beldy there are waterfalls namely Ashgill Force (the larger of the two) and Thortergill Force. Thortergill Force was formerly known to locals as Lady's Walk and is also otherwise known as Beldy Waterfall.

The closest town is Alston, four miles away to the north.

The parish church of St John was for centuries a chapel of ease to St Augustine's at Alston but was promoted to full parish status in the 1980s. It is served by a team vicar based at Alston who also serves the churches at Nenthead, Knarsdale, Kirkhaugh and Lambley. There used to be several non-conformist chapels at or just outside Garrigill as well. Unlike most of the rest of Cumbria the parishes of Alston, Nenthead and Garrigill are within the Diocese of Newcastle not the Diocese of Carlisle.

At nearby Tynehead, now only a single house but once a thriving mining community, there was until the 1930s a primary school which was the highest school there has ever been in England. Garrigill's own school, located at Gatefoot on the Leadgate road, closed in the 1960s.

== Sport ==
Both the Pennine Way, the oldest of the UK's National Trails, and the Sea to Sea Cycle Route (C2C) England's most popular long-distance cycle route, pass through the village.

The London-Edinburgh-London cycle event passes through the village.

The Spine Race passes through the village.

== Residents ==
Garrigill was the home of Westgarth Forster (1772–1835), geologist and mining engineer. He published A Treatise on a Section of the Strata from Newcastle-upon-Tyne to the Mountain of Cross Fell in Cumberland. Descendants of the Forster family still reside in Garrigill to this day, and there is a memorial to him in the churchyard.

Garrigill is home to landscape artist Lionel Playford, whose works have been featured in various galleries across the country, to artist and illustrator Akasha Raven, known for her surreal and imaginative paintings and drawings, and to Coxhoe-born artist Gillie Cawthorne, many of whose dramatic watercolour paintings are inspired by the moody North Pennine landscape.

== See also ==
- Listed buildings in Alston Moor
