= Allott =

Allott is a surname. Notable people with the surname include:

- Antony Nicholas Allott (1924–2002), English academic
- Geoff Allott (born 1971), New Zealand cricketer
- Gordon L. Allott (1907–1989), American politician
- Jeannie Allott (born 1956), English/Dutch footballer
- Kenneth Allott (1912–1973), British poet
- Mark Allott (born 1977), English footballer
- Miriam Allott (1920–2010), English literary scholar
- Molly Allott (1918–2013), Royal Air Force officer
- Nick Allott (born 1954), British theatre producer
- Paul Allott (born 1956), English cricketer
- Robert Allott, 17th-century English editor, poet and writer
- Tommy Allott (1908–1975), English motorcycle speedway rider
- William Dixon Allott (c. 1817–1892), Mayor of Adelaide

== See also ==
- Allot (disambiguation)
