= Knarsdale =

Village in Northumberland, England

Coordinates: 54.8752°N 2.5080°W

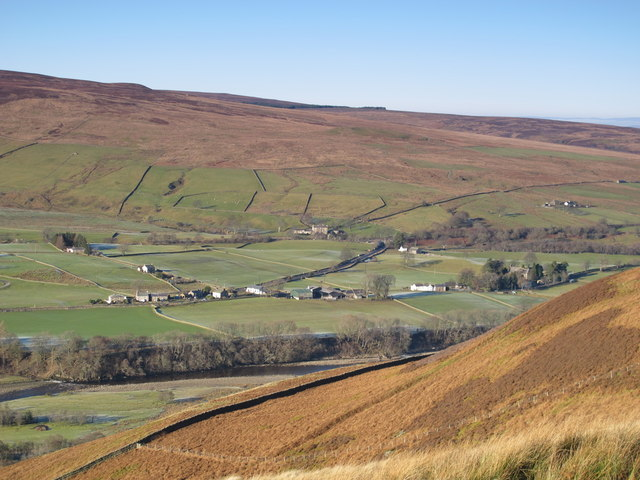
- Knarsdale

- Location within Northumberland
- Population: 279 (2011. Civil Parish)
- OS grid reference: NY675535
- Civil parish: Knaresdale with Kirkhaugh
- Unitary authority: Northumberland
- Ceremonial county: Northumberland
- Region: North East
- Country: England
- Sovereign state: United Kingdom
- Post town: BRAMPTON
- Postcode district: CA8
- Police: Northumbria
- Fire: Northumberland
- Ambulance: North East
- UK Parliament: Hexham

Knarsdale, historically Knaresdale, is a village in the civil parish of Knaresdale with Kirkhaugh, in Northumberland, England about 5 miles (8 km) north of Alston. The village takes its name from the Knarr Burn: Knarr means 'rugged rock'.

== History ==
The manor of Knarsdale was held in medieval times by the Swinburn family, and in 1313 Hugh de Swinburn was rector of Knarsdale. It was later held by the Wallis family, who sold it in 1730 to John Stephenson, a Newcastle merchant. One of the Stephenson family built Alston market cross. But in 1769 Knarsdale was sold to James Wallace, a distinguished lawyer. His son Thomas, for services to his country, was created Baron Wallace of Knarsdale. The family also owned Featherstone Castle, and Hodgson described Knarsdale Hall as having declined in importance — a gentleman's place of the 17th century now and for a long time since occupied by the farmer of the adjoining grounds... The garden walls have lost their trimness, the malt kilns and the brewhouse are gone. Today, however, the stone buildings on top of a high mound dominate the scene and are strongly built. The mullioned windows seem to have been inserted into an older hall.

== Governance ==
Knarsdale is in the parliamentary constituency of Hexham. In 1951 the parish had a population of 289. On 1 April 1955 the parish was abolished to form Slaggyford which was renamed "Knaresdale with Kirkhaugh" in 1967.

== Religious sites ==
The church is dedicated to St Jude, and Hodgson saw it in a ruinous condition, with stone lying about. It had been rebuilt in the seventeenth century, and old grave slabs were used in the building. In 1833, however, it was rebuilt at a cost of £300 and a new rectory was erected at this time. On the south wall of the church, beneath the sundial, is a stone carved with Erected 1833. Rev. Thomas Bewsher, Rector. William Parker and Joseph Richardson, Church Wardens. Enlarged 1882. Vestry and Porch added 1906. There is a fine collection of gravestones and one carried a strange inscription, which Hodgson called 'disgraceful doggerel':

All you who please these lines to read
It will cause a tender heart to bleed:
I murdered was upon the fell,
And by a man I knew full well;
My bread and butter which he'd lade,
I, being harmless, was betrayed.
I hope he will rewarded be,
That laid the poison here for me.

It was the epitaph of Robert Baxter, who died 4 October 1796. A man with whom he had a quarrel allegedly left a poisoned wrapped sandwich for him, but there was seemingly no inquest to confirm the accusation. The gravestone is now broken.

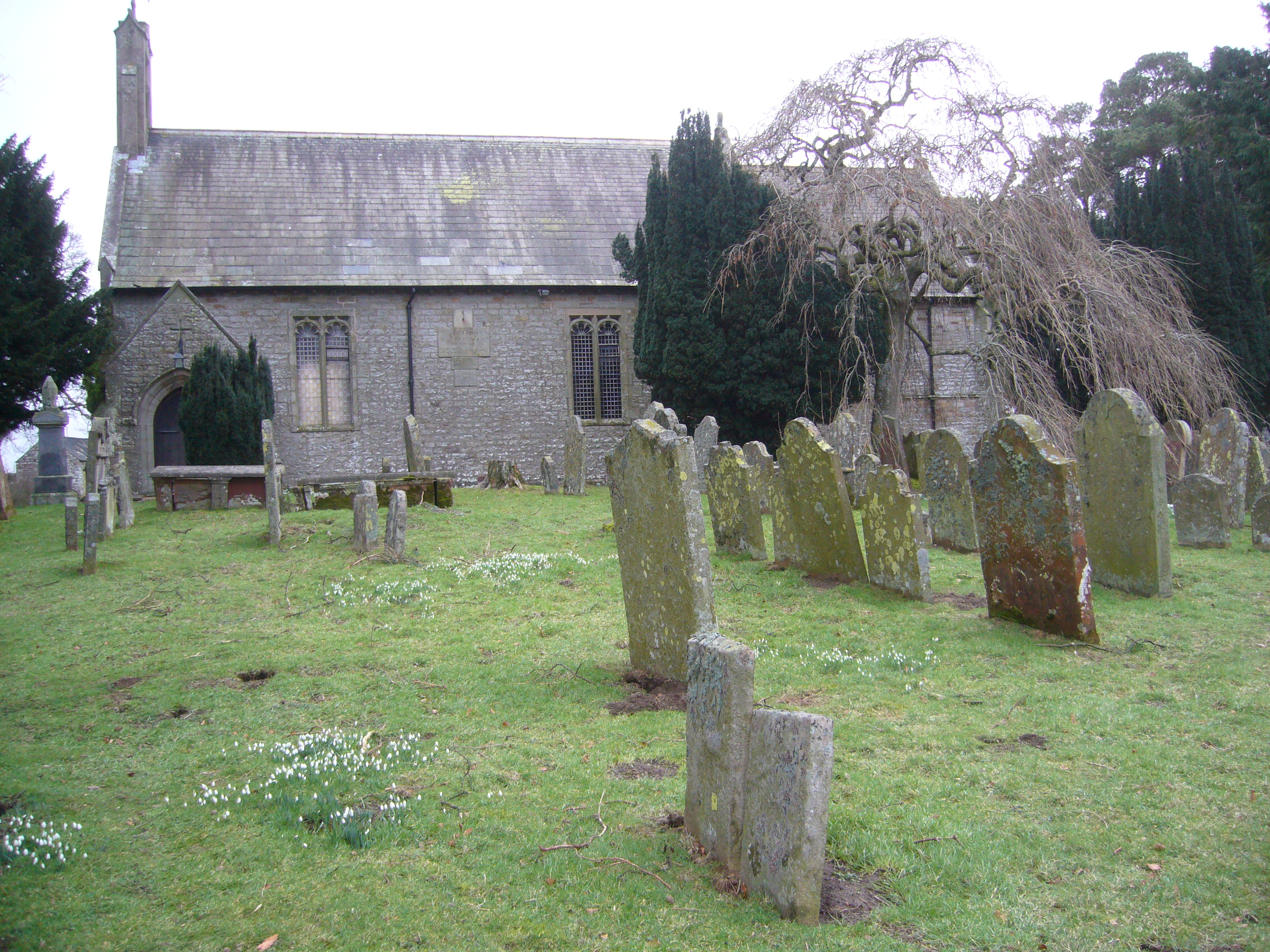
St Jude's Church, Knarsdale
