= Ayle =

Village in Northumberland, England

Coordinates: 54.840°N 2.445°W

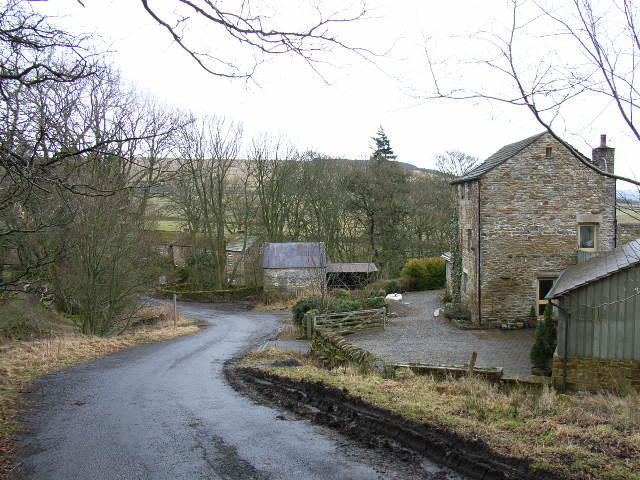
- Aylebank Barn is on the right with Ayle House in the trees beyond.

- Location within Northumberland
- OS grid reference: NY715495
- Unitary authority: Northumberland
- Ceremonial county: Northumberland
- Region: North East
- Country: England
- Sovereign state: United Kingdom
- Post town: ALSTON
- Postcode district: CA9
- Dialling code: 01434
- Police: Northumbria
- Fire: Northumberland
- Ambulance: North East
- UK Parliament: Hexham

Ayle is a village in Northumberland, England, situated to the north of Alston. There are six residences in the hamlet.

== Governance ==
Ayle is in the parliamentary constituency of Hexham.
