= Listed buildings in Alston Moor =

Alston Moor is a civil parish in Westmorland and Furness, Cumbria, England. It contains 90 buildings that are recorded in the National Heritage List for England. Of these, three are listed at Grade II*, the middle grade, and the others are at Grade II, the lowest grade. The parish contains the market town of Alston, the villages of Garrigill and Nenthead, smaller communities, and the surrounding countryside. Nenthead was surrounded by mines, particularly for lead, and some of the listed buildings in and around the village are associated with this industry. Otherwise, most of the listed buildings are houses and associated structures, shops, public houses, hotels, and churches in and around Alston. There is a series of milestones provided for the local turnpike trust. The other listed buildings include a wayside cross, bridges, a former brewery, a former mill, former railway station buildings, a market cross, municipal buildings, a former bank, two war memorials, and a memorial pump.

== Key ==
Grade	Criteria
II*	Particularly important buildings of more than special interest
II	Buildings of national importance and special interest

== Buildings ==
Name and location	Photograph	Date	Notes	Grade
Killhope Cross; 54.78354°N 2.31356°W		Medieval (possible)	The cross is a boundary marker on the border between Cumbria and County Durham, and was moved to its present position in the 18th century. It consists of a single stone about 3 feet (0.91 m) high in the form of a Latin cross, with carved lettering on all faces. It stands on a square base that contains a benchmark.	II
Angel Inn; 54.81263°N 2.44022°W		Early 17th century	The inn is in stone with a stone-flag roof, and has two storeys with an attic, and three bays. The central doorway has a chamfered surround and a bracketed cornice. To the left is a two-storey canted bay window, and to the right is a sash window in each floor. In the roof is an 18th-century dormer with a central mullion, casement windows, a cornice, and a semicircular top with a finial.	II
Former bastle at Low Park; 54.81333°N 2.45348°W	—	Early 17th century	The bastle, later converted into a farmhouse, is in sandstone on a plinth, with quoins, and without a roof. There are two storeys and attics, with a byre in the ground floor and living accommodation above. In the south gable wall is an entrance to the byre with chamfered jambs, and a massive curved and chamfered lintel, and on the east front is an entrance to the upper floor, originally reached by external steps. Elsewhere, are the remains of mullioned windows and a blocked slit vent.	II
Randalholme Hall and byre 54.83092°N 2.45608°W		17th century	A large house incorporating a tower and a former bastle house. The tower is in sandstone, with three storeys and attics, and has quoins and a moulded cornice. It contains sash windows and a heraldic panel dated 1746, and has a Welsh slate roof. The west range was formerly a two-storey house, and later used as a farm building.	II
Clarghyll Hall; 54.83795°N 2.42869°W		17th century	A country house that originated as two bastle houses. Extensions were added later in the 17th century, in the 18th century the houses were joined, and there were further additions in the late 19th century. The house is in stone with quoins, and roof of stone-flags and slate. It has an L-shaped plan, with a three-storey tower to the left, a two-storey north wing, and an east wing in Gothic style with one tall storey; all have undercrofts. The windows are mulliond or mullioned and transomed.	II*
Blue Bell Hotel; 54.81200°N 2.44146°W		1680	The hotel was extended to the left in 1746. It is in stone with a stone-flag roof, and has two storeys. The original part has a chamfered plinth, rusticated quoins, a band, three bays, and a central door. The extension also has three bays, and has a doorway in the left bay, and a canted oriel window in the upper floor. All the other windows are sashes.	II
Church Gates; 54.81263°N 2.44010°W		1681	The house was extended in 1890. It is in stone with a stone-flag roof, and has an L-shaped plan, with two storeys and four bays. Above the plank door is an inscribed and dated lintel. To the right of the door is a mullioned window, to the left is a casement window, and in the upper floor are sash windows. To the right is a porch and external staircase that were added later.	II
Property to west of Angel Inn; 54.81262°N 2.44034°W		1687	Originally an inn, later a shop, it is in incised stucco and has a stone-flagged roof. There are three storeys, a symmetrical front of three bays, a central door, sash windows, and a datestone in the top floor.	II
Cross View Cottage; 54.81269°N 2.43900°W	—	1690s	A stone house with a stone-flag roof, it is in three storeys with attics, and has three bays. Steps lead up to a doorway in the middle floor, and the windows are sashes. At the top is a gabled dormer with decorative bargeboards and an apex finial.	II
Orchard House; 54.81258°N 2.44151°W		Early 18th century	A stone house in a row, with quoins at the right end, and a slate roof. It has two storeys, a symmetrical front of three bays, a central doorway in a stone surround, and sash windows.	II
Quaker Meeting House; 54.81151°N 2.43813°W		1732	The meeting house was heightened in 1764, when most of the mullioned windows were replaced by sash windows, and a gabled porch was added in about 1850. The building is in a single storey with three bays, the 1732 lintel has been re-used in the porch, and one two-light mullioned window remains, now blocked.	II
No. 4 Station Road; 54.81228°N 2.44166°W	—	Mid-18th century	A stuccoed house in a row, that has a slate roof with stone coping. There are two storeys and two bays, a doorway with a Tuscan doorcase and a pediment, and sash windows.	II
Alston House; 54.81153°N 2.44146°W		Mid-18th century	A hotel, formerly Hillcrest Hotel, in stone on a chamfered plinth with quoins and an artificial slate roof. There are two storeys with attics, and eight bays. In the sixth bay is a 20th-century porch, to the right of it are stepped buttresses, and further to the right is a 19th-century canted bay window that contains windows with pointed heads.	II
Blackstock's baker's shop 54.81233°N 2.43926°W	—	Mid-18th century	A shop in stone with a roof of artificial slate, it has three storeys and two bays. In the ground floor, to the right are two doorways with traceried fanlights, and to the left is a shop window, all under a cornice. Above are sash windows.	II
Property to east of Blackstock's baker's shop 54.81233°N 2.43915°W	—	Mid-18th century	A shop with a house above, in stone with a stone-flag roof. There are three storeys and two bays. In the ground floor is a doorway and a 19th-century shop window with fluted uprights to the right. To the left are steps with a wrought iron handrail leading up to a house door in the middle floor. There is a sash window to the right of this, and two sash windows in the top floor.	II
Salvin House, Townfoot; 54.81182°N 2.44153°W	—	Mid-18th century	A stone house in a row, with a stone-flag roof. It has two storeys, a symmetrical front of three bays, a central doorway with a fanlight and a rusticated surround, and sash windows.	II
Corner house to south of Blue Bell Hotel; 54.81176°N 2.44158°W	—	Mid-18th century	A stone house on a corner site with a stone-flag roof, in two storeys with an attic. There is one bay on the front facing the road, and two bays in the canted front on the right side. The doorway is on this front, and the windows are sashes.	II
The Cottage; 54.81259°N 2.43963°W	—	Mid-18th century	A stone house with an artificial slate roof, in two storeys and with a symmetrical three-bay front. Steps lead up to a central doorway, and the windows are sashes. To the right is a small plank door, and at the rear are later casement windows.	II
Property to east of Cross View Cottage; 54.81270°N 2.43894°W	—	18th century	A stone house with a stone-flag roof, it has three storeys with attics and two bays. In the ground floor is a door, and to the right is a two-storey canted bay window containing sashes. Above this is a single sash window, and in the attic is a fixed window. Steps lead up to a blocked doorway in the first floor.	II
Gossipgate Bridge; 54.81528°N 2.43033°W		18th century (probable)	The bridge carries a track over the River Nent. It is in stone and consists of a single segmental arch. The bridge has a parapet with flat copings, and a panel inscribed with details of the repair in 1834.	II
H. Kearton's shops 54.81266°N 2.43916°W	—	18th century	A pair of shops with a stone-flagged roof, four storeys, and sash windows. The shop on the left is stuccoed, it has a symmetrical three-bay front, and a doorway flanked by canted shop windows. The shop on the right is in ashlar with rusticated quoins and has two bays. In the ground floor is a doorway on the right of a 19th-century shop window with three segmental-headed lights under a cornice carried on consoles.	II
Ivy House Farmhouse and byre 54.76755°N 2.39834°W		18th century	The buildings are in stone. The farmhouse has quoins and a stone-flag roof. It has two storeys, a symmetrical front of five bays, a central door with a bracketed hood, and sash windows. At the rear is a 19th-century outshut incorporating a re-used lintel dated 1694. To the right is a byre with four windows, and an outshut with a Welsh slate roof.	II
Walls, gate and piers, Ivy House Farmhouse; 54.76760°N 2.39811°W	—	18th century (probable)	In front of the garden is a low stone wall with flat coping. In the centre and at the ends are square rusticated piers with ogee caps. The gate dates from the 20th century.	II
Lyndhurst; 54.81222°N 2.44167°W	—	Mid-18th century	A house in a row, in rendered stone that has a slate roof with stone copings. There are two storeys, two bays, and a doorway with a Tuscan doorcase and a pediment. To the left is a canted bay window, and in the upper floor are sash windows.	II
Property at west end of Front Street; 54.81263°N 2.44117°W	—	Mid-18th century	A house with a byre below, it is in stone with quoins and a stone-flag roof. There are two storeys with an attic, and three bays. The byre has a plank door, and an external dog-leg stair leads to a door in the upper floor. The attic windows are fixed, and the other windows are sashes.	II
Property to south of Midland Bank; 54.81239°N 2.43935°W	—	Mid-18th century	Originally a house, later a shop, in pebbledashed stone with a stone-flagged roof. It has a front of three storeys and four bays. In the ground floor is a 20th-century lean-to shop front, and to the right is a passage entry. In the upper floors are sash windows.	II
Property formerly occupied by the Sunderland Building Society; 54.81222°N 2.43878°W	—	Mid-18th century	A shop on a sloping site, in stone with a stone-flag roof. There are three storeys and three bays. In the ground floor, to the left, is a wagon opening, and to the right is a projecting shop front. Above are sash windows, and a window with decorative glazing depicting a pestle and mortar, initials and a date.	II
Monument View, railings and gate 54.81237°N 2.44158°W	—	Mid-18th century	A stone house in a row, with quoins at the south end and a stone-flagged roof. There are three storeys and two bays. Steps lead up to the doorway in the middle floor, and the windows are sashes. In front of the area are cast iron railings, a central gate, and standards with fleur-de-lis heads.	II
House to north of Monument View; 54.81241°N 2.44157°W	—	Mid-18th century	A stone house in a row, with quoins at the north end and a stone-flagged roof. There are three storeys and two bays. Steps lead up to the doorway in the middle floor, and the windows are sashes.	II
House to south of Monument View; 54.81234°N 2.44159°W	—	18th century	A stuccoed house in a row, with a stone-flagged roof. There are two storeys and four bys, and the windows are sashes.	II
Sun House; 54.81250°N 2.44155°W		Mid-18th century	A stone house in a row, with quoins at the north end and a slate roof. There are two storeys and two bays. Above the door is a traceried fanlight, and the windows are sashes.	II
Congregational Chapel; 54.77023°N 2.40721°W		1756	The chapel, also known as Redwing Chapel, became redundant in about 1977. It is in stone with quoins and has a stone-flag roof. The chapel has a single storey, and a lean-to was added later at the west end. In the east wall is a doorway with a chamfered surround and a dated lintel. On the south side are four round-arched windows with moulded surrounds.	II
Market Cross; 54.81257°N 2.43895°W		1764	The structure has been rebuilt and re-erected on a number of occasions. In the centre is a replacement cross shaft on the site of the original cross. It is surrounded by a square canopy on eight Tuscan columns carrying a pyramidal stone-flag roof with a lantern at the apex. There are inscriptions on the shaft detailing the history of the cross.	II*
Bird-house, Clarghyll Hall; 54.83808°N 2.42835°W	—	Mid- to late 18th century	The bird house is by a pool in the garden of the hall, and is in stone with quoins and a hipped Welsh slate roof. It has three storeys and an entrance in the middle floor. In the ground floor is an elliptical arch with a projecting keystone for waterfowl, above are hen openings with triangular heads, and under the eaves are dove holes.	II
High Mill; 54.81251°N 2.43830°W		1767	A water-powered corn mill by John Smeaton, extended by 1775 and later increased in height. It is in sandstone with quoins, and has roofs of Welsh slate and stone-slate. The mill has an L-shaped plan, with four storeys, four bays, and a slightly projecting enclosed rectangular wheelhouse to the west. Most of the windows are casements, and there is an entrance in the east front. Inside the wheelhouse is a water wheel in cast iron and timber, with a diameter of 21 feet (6.4 m) and a width of 26 inches (660 mm), containing about 60 wooden buckets.	II*
Walls and piers, Clarghyll Hall; 54.83803°N 2.42655°W	—	Before 1775	At the entrance to the drive leading to the hall are quadrant drystone walls with flat copings. At the ends, and flanking the drive, are ashlar piers with pyramidal caps. The wooden gate dates from the 20th century.	II
Bridge House; 54.76897°N 2.39707°W	—	Late 18th century	Originally two cottages, later combined into one house, it is in stone with a stone-flag roof. There are three storeys and four bays. On the front are two panelled doors in the centre, and the windows are sashes.	II
Four Pines; 54.76903°N 2.39715°W	—	Late 18th century	Formally two houses, later combined into one, it is in stone with a stone-flag roof. There are two storeys with attics, and four bays. On the front is a plank door in an openwork porch, with one casement window to the left and two to the right. In the upper floor are two sash windows, a blocked window between them above the door, and three two-light windows in the attics.	II
Lowbyer Manor Hotel; 54.81580°N 2.44141°W	—	Late 18th century	Originally a large private house, later a hotel, it is built at right angles to the road. The hotel is in stone on a chamfered plinth, and has quoins and a stone-flag roof. There are two storeys with a basement, and a symmetrical front of five bays. Steps lead up to a central doorway with a fanlight, and the windows are sashes. At the rear is a stair window with a four-centred head. To the north, and at right angles, a former barn with inserted windows has been integrated into the hotel.	II
The Shieling; 54.76909°N 2.39722°W	—	Late 18th century	A stone cottage at the end of a row with a stone-flag roof. There are two storeys with an attic and two bays. On the right is a plank door, and on the left is a sash window in each floor and a two-light attic window above.	II
South Tyne House and part of former brewery 54.80947°N 2.44362°W		Late 18th century	The brewmaster's house and the former brewery buildings are in stone with roofs of slate and stone-slate. The house has two storeys, cellars and basements, three bays, and a doorcase with Tuscan columns and a pediment. The other structures comprise a former tavern, a waterwheel house, a wine, spirit and beer store, a brewhouse, a cooperage, cottages, a transport house that originally accommodated stables on the ground floor and a hayloft above, and a reservoir.	II
Loaning Foot House; 54.81764°N 2.44184°W	—	Late 18th to early 19th century	A stone house with quoins and a slate roof, it has two storeys and a symmetrical front of three bays. The central doorway has a rectangular fanlight, and the windows are sashes.	II
Lowbyer Manor Farmhouse; 54.81606°N 2.44138°W	—	Late 18th to early 19th century	The farmhouse is in stone with quoins and a stone-flag roof. There are two storeys, a symmetrical three-bay front, a central doorway with a stone surround, and sash windows.	II
Third house from the west 54.78816°N 2.34058°W	—	Late 18th to early 19th century	This originated as a house with a byre below. It is in stone with some brick, and has a stone-flag roof. There are three storeys and two bays. In the ground floor is a door to the byre, and steps lead up to a house door in the middle floor. The windows are sashes.	II
Vicarage and stable 54.81233°N 2.44016°W	—	c. 1812	The vicarage and stable block are in stone with quoins and slate roofs; the house has coped gables. The house has two storeys, a symmetrical front of three bays, a central doorway with a stone surround, and sash windows. At the rear is a stair windows with a semicircular head. To the right, and recessed, is a lower two-storey stable block, and in the junction with the house is a lean-to.	II
Ivy House; 54.78813°N 2.34131°W	—	c. 1825	A stone house with a slate roof, in two storeys and with a symmetrical front of three bays. In the centre is a doorway with a rusticated surround, and the windows are sashes in stone surrounds. At the rear is an outshut with two 20th-century dormers.	II
1 Dene Terrace; 54.78685°N 2.34410°W	—	Early 19th century	Originally two houses, later combined into one, on a corner site, it is in stone with a stone-slate roof and stone copings. There are two storeys and an east front of four bays. The windows are sashes.	II
Former Powder Magazine; 54.78940°N 2.34024°W	—	Early 19th century (probable)	The powder magazine was later used as a farm building. It is in stone with walls between 18 inches (460 mm) and 20 inches (510 mm) think, and it has a thick pyramidal stone roof. The building has a square plan, it includes a doorway and small windows, probably enlarged ventilation slits, and there are other inserted openings.	II
The Gatehouse; 54.82221°N 2.44297°W	—	Early 19th century	Originally a toll house, later a private house, it is in stone with quoins and a stone-flag roof. It has two storeys, a symmetrical three-bay front, a central door, and sash windows.	II
Garage and garden walls, Loaning Foot House; 54.81754°N 2.44197°W	—	Early 19th century (probable)	The walls are in stone with segmental coping on the south and west sides of the garden. In the centre of the south wall are gate piers with pyramidal caps. The wall on the west side rises to form a wall of an outbuilding, later used as a garage. This has quoins and a hipped slate roof.	II
Milestone; 54.81237°N 2.44120°W		Early 19th century	The milestone was provided for the Alston Turnpike Trust and is set into the wall in front of the Town Hall. It has an elliptical top, and is about 4 feet (1.2 m) high by about 2 feet (0.61 m) wide. It is painted white and is inscribed with "ALSTON" and the distances in miles to Hexham, Penrith, Brampton, Middleton, and Stanhope.	II
Milestone; 54.81028°N 2.41557°W	—	Early 19th century	The milestone is on the A689 road and was provided for the Alston Turnpike Trust. It is in stone with an elliptical top, and is about 2 feet (0.61 m) high by 1.5 feet (0.46 m) wide. The milestone is inscribed with the distances in miles to Nenthead, Alston and Copthill.	II
Milestone; 54.80928°N 2.39071°W	—	Early 19th century	The milestone is on the A689 road and was provided for the Alston Turnpike Trust. It is in stone with an elliptical top, and is about 2 feet (0.61 m) high by 1.5 feet (0.46 m) wide. The milestone is inscribed with the distances in miles to Alston and Nenthead.	II
Milestone; 54.79374°N 2.35237°W	—	Early 19th century	The milestone is on the A689 road and was provided for the Alston Turnpike Trust. It is in stone with a semicircular top, and is about 2 feet (0.61 m) high by 1.5 feet (0.46 m) wide. The milestone is inscribed with the distances in miles to Alston and Nenthead.	II
Milestone; 54.78637°N 2.33274°W	—	Early 19th century	The milestone is on the A689 road and was provided for the Alston Turnpike Trust. It is in stone with a semicircular top, and is about 2 feet (0.61 m) high by 1.5 feet (0.46 m) wide. The milestone is inscribed with the distances in miles to Nenthead, Cowshill and Stanhope.	II
Milestone; 54.83594°N 2.42505°W	—	Early 19th century	The milestone is on the A686 road to the north of Alston, and was provided for the Alston Turnpike Trust. It is in stone with an elliptical top, and is about 2 feet (0.61 m) high by 1.5 feet (0.46 m) wide. The milestone is inscribed with the distances in miles to Alston, Haydon Bridge and Hexham.	II
Milestone; 54.84325°N 2.41201°W	—	Early 19th century	The milestone is on the A686 road to the north of Alston, and was provided for the Alston Turnpike Trust. It is in stone with an elliptical top, and is about 2 feet (0.61 m) high by 1.5 feet (0.46 m) wide. The milestone is inscribed with the distances in miles to Alston, Haydon Bridge and Hexham.	II
Milestone; 54.78920°N 2.46862°W	—	Early 19th century	The milestone is on the A686 road to the south of Alston, and was provided for the Alston Turnpike Trust. It is in stone with an elliptical top, and is about 2 feet (0.61 m) high by 1.5 feet (0.46 m) wide. The milestone is inscribed with the distances in miles to Alston and Penrith.	II
Milestone; 54.78045°N 2.48824°W	—	Early 19th century	The milestone is on the A686 road to the south of Alston, and was provided for the Alston Turnpike Trust. It is in stone with an elliptical top, and is about 2 feet (0.61 m) high by 1.5 feet (0.46 m) wide. The milestone is inscribed with the distances in miles to Alston and Penrith.	II
Milestone; 54.78718°N 2.42290°W	—	Early 19th century	The milestone is on the B6277 road and was provided for the Alston Turnpike Trust. It is in stone with an elliptical top, and is about 2 feet (0.61 m) high by 1.5 feet (0.46 m) wide. The milestone is inscribed with the distances in miles to Alston and Middleton. On the top is a benchmark.	II
Milestone; 54.75958°N 2.37821°W	—	Early 19th century	The milestone is on the B6277 road and was provided for the Alston Turnpike Trust. It is in stone with a semicircular top, and is about 2 feet (0.61 m) high by 1.5 feet (0.46 m) wide. The milestone is inscribed with the distances in miles to Alston and Middleton.	II
Milestone; 54.77207°N 2.39034°W	—	Early 19th century	The milestone is on the B6277 road and was provided for the Alston Turnpike Trust. It is in stone with a semicircular top, and is about 2 feet (0.61 m) high by 1.5 feet (0.46 m) wide. The milestone is inscribed with the distances in miles to Alston and Middleton.	II
Milestone; 54.74821°N 2.36875°W	—	Early 19th century	The milestone is on the B6277 road and was provided for the Alston Turnpike Trust. It is in stone with an elliptical top, and is about 2 feet (0.61 m) high by 1.5 feet (0.46 m) wide. The milestone is inscribed with the distances in miles to Alston and Middleton. At the bottom is a benchmark.	II
Milestone; 54.73525°N 2.35797°W	—	Early 19th century	The milestone is on the B6277 road and was provided for the Alston Turnpike Trust. It is in stone with an elliptical top, and is about 2 feet (0.61 m) high by 1.5 feet (0.46 m) wide. The milestone is inscribed in damaged lettering with the distances in miles to Alston and Middleton.	II
Milestone; 54.72194°N 2.35085°W	—	Early 19th century	The milestone is on the B6277 road and was provided for the Alston Turnpike Trust. It is in stone with an elliptical top, and is about 2 feet (0.61 m) high by 1.5 feet (0.46 m) wide. The milestone is inscribed with the distances in miles to Alston and Middleton.	II
Gilderdale Bridge; 54.82952°N 2.46517°W	—	1830	The bridge carries the A689 road over Gilderdale Beck, and crosses the county boundary with Northumberland. The bridge is in stone, and consists of a single tall segmental arch with pilaster buttresses on each side. The parapet has flat coping, and there are curved lead-ups that have low end piers with chamfered capstones. In the centre of each parapet is an inscribed and dated stone.	II
Claim Stone; 54.83681°N 2.39414°W	—	1836	The stone making the claim is about 5 feet (1.5 m) high, and has a rounded top. It is carved with dates and miners' names.	II
Harbut Lodge; 54.82003°N 2.45066°W	—	1838	A country house in ashlar stone on a chamfered plinth with a Westmorland slate roof. It has two storeys, a symmetrical front of three bays, and a single-storey service wing at the rear. On the front are canted bay windows and a central doorway with a moulded surround and a stone canopy on consoles. In the upper floor are sash windows with canopies, the window above the door having a swan-neck pediment.	II
Boundary stone 54.77812°N 2.35791°W	—	1849	The boundary stone, in a field, is about 5 feet (1.5 m) high, and carries carved lettering on the south face.	II
The Beeches; 54.79221°N 2.35009°W	—	Mid-19th century (probable)	A stone house with quoins and a hipped Welsh slate roof. It has two storeys, a symmetrical front of three bays, and two bays on the sides. Above the central doorway is a hood on brackets, and the windows are sashes.	II
Boundary stone 54.77269°N 2.39072°W	—	Mid-19th century (probable)	The boundary stone, which was later used as a gatepost, is about 4 feet (1.2 m) high. It has an elliptical top, and carries inscriptions.	II
Boundary stone 54.77767°N 2.36293°W	—	Mid-19th century (probable)	The boundary stone, in an isolated position in a field, is about 4 feet (1.2 m) high. and carries carved lettering on two faces.	II
Milestone; 54.82671°N 2.44337°W	—	19th century (probable)	The milestone is on the A686 road to the north of Alston, and was probably provided for the Alston Turnpike Trust. It consists of a stone about 2.5 feet (0.76 m) high with two angled front faces and an angled top. The milestone is inscribed with the distances in miles to Haydon Bridge, Alston, and Hexham.	II
Milestone; 54.79996°N 2.45314°W		19th century (possible)	The milestone is on the A686 road to the south of Alston, and was possibly provided for the Alston Turnpike Trust. It consists of a stone about 2.5 feet (0.76 m) high with two angled front faces and an angled top. The milestone is inscribed with the distances in miles to Alston, Melmberby, and Penrith. On the top at the rear is a benchmark.	II
Milestone; 54.80087°N 2.42896°W		19th century (probable)	The milestone is on the B6277 road and was probably provided for the Alston Turnpike Trust. It consists of a stone about 2.5 feet (0.76 m) high with two angled front faces and an angled top. The milestone is inscribed with the distances in miles to Ashgillhead, Alston, and Middleton.	II
Former goods shed 54.81497°N 2.44170°W		Mid-19th century	The goods shed was built to serve the Alston branch of the Newcastle and Carlisle Railway. It is in stone, and has stepped diagonal buttressing and a hipped Welsh slate roof. In the north and south walls are train arches, in the east wall are two arches for access to the wagons, and in the west wall are three fixed windows. (Note: Street View in May 2016 showed the goods shed to be in use by The Hub Museum,)	II
Station House; 54.81453°N 2.44177°W		1852	Station buildings and a stationmaster's house for the Alston branch of the Newcastle and Carlisle Railway, they are in stone with Welsh slate roofs, and are in Tudor style. They have two storeys, and a symmetrical front of four bays. The outer bays project forward and are gabled; they each contain a door with a four-centred arched head, and a three-light mullioned window above. The middle two bays have two-light mullioned windows; all the windows and doorways have hood moulds. On the platform front, the house has a bay window.	II
Reading Room; 54.78804°N 2.34139°W		1855	The reading room was built by the London Lead Company, it was enlarged in 1859, and has since been used for other purposes. It is in stone with a stone-flag roof, it has a single storey, sash windows, and has a curved southwest corner. On the north side is an outshut porch, and in the west wall are inscribed panels. (Note: Street View in March 2009 showed it in use as a community shop and Post Office.)	II
Town Hall, library and bank 54.81239°N 2.44072°W		1857	A group of municipal buildings in Gothic style. They are in stone on a plinth, with quoins, a string course, and slate roofs with stone copings. It has two storeys and attics, an asymmetrical front of five bays, and mullioned and transomed windows. In the centre is a clock tower that has a doorway with a pointed head, and a pyramidal roof with lucarnes. To the right is the library with a large window in the upper floor, flanked by niches. The west front is symmetrical with three bays and a central dormer.	II
St Augustine's Church; 54.81288°N 2.43970°W		1869–70	The church is built on a medieval site, replacing earlier churches, and the steeple was added in 1886. The church is in Early English style with lancet windows. It is built in ashlar stone on a plinth, with buttresses and moulded eaves. It has a roof of Welsh slate with stone copings and apex crosses. The church consists of a nave with a clerestory, a south aisle, a chancel, and a steeple at the southwest with a south porch. The steeple has a three-stage tower, corner pinnacles, and a recessed spire. Above the tower entrance is a tympanum carved with Christ in Majesty. Inside the church is an arcade with polished granite piers and foliate capitals.	II
Nenthead Methodist Church; 54.78809°N 2.34170°W		1873	The church is in Italianate style. It is in sandstone and has a Lakeland slate roof with coped gables and a wrought iron finial. In the entrance front are paired round-arched doorways with chamfered jambs, moulded imposts and keyed archivolts. The flanking windows and those in the storey above have similar surrounds. Above the doors is an inscribed panel. On the south front, facing the road are four flat-headed windows in the ground floor and four round-headed windows above; all the windows are casements. At the north end is a single-storey extension with a hipped roof.	II
Memorial pump and canopy 54.78792°N 2.34139°W	—	1877	The pump and canopy) are in cast iron and stand in the centre of Nenthead. The pump is cylindrical, fluted and about 2.5 feet (0.76 m) high, with a bucket rest and lion's head spout. The canopy has four columns with detailing in Classical, Egyptian and Gothic styles, and they support a ribbed dome with a finial. On the sides are inscribed plaques, and on the corners are obelisk finials.	II
Former bank and manager's house 54.81172°N 2.43828°W		1898	The building is in red sandstone with dressings in buff sandstone, a corbelled eaves cornice and a Welsh slate roof. There are three storeys, a front of four bays with the house in the left two bays, and the bank to the right, and a two-storey rear range. The left bay contains a two-storey bay window, above which is a two-light window and a gablet with a datestone, kneelers and ball finials. In the right bay is a semicircular porch with Corinthian pilasters, an egg and dart cornice, a parapet and a balustrade. At the top of the bay is a parapet with a small pediment. To the left of the porch is a three-light mullioned and transomed window with a pediment, and in the second bay is a doorway with a fanlight. Most of the windows have ornate lintels and aprons with scrolled carving.	II
Alston War memorial 54.80897°N 2.44414°W		1922	The war memorial stands in a semicircular paved area at a road junction. It is in Westmorland limestone, and is in the form of an obelisk about 3 metres (9.8 ft) high on a tall plinth with a moulded cap and with four carved wreaths at the base. On the plinth is an inscription and the names of those lost in the two World Wars. The paving in the area is in Penrith red sandstone.	II
Nenthall War memorial 54.80630°N 2.37554°W		1922	The war memorial is in an enclosure at a road junction. It is in grey granite, and consists of a Latin cross with Celtic knotwork carved on the cross and the front of the shaft. The cross is on a rough-hewn plinth on a rusticated base. Carved on the plinth is an inscription and sheathed sword through a wreath in relief.	II
Forecourt walls, Bridge House, Four Pines and The Shieling; 54.76901°N 2.39722°W	—	Undated	Drystone walls run in front of the gardens of the three houses and have flat coping. There are four gate openings, and the gateposts are slabs with semicircular heads.	II
Burial ground walls and gate, Congregational Chapel; 54.77040°N 2.40714°W	—	Undated	A drystone wall surrounds the burial ground. It is about 4 feet (1.2 m) high and has semicircular coping. In the east wall is a 20th-century wooden gate.	II
Walls, gate piers and gate, Ivy House; 54.78807°N 2.34121°W		Undated	The low stone walls are in front and to the south of the forecourt, and have copings resembling battlements. The stone gate piers are rusticated and have small ball finials. To the left of the gate is the original boot scraper.	II
Walls to burial ground, Quaker Meeting House; 54.81145°N 2.43799°W		Undated	The drystone walls are on three sides in front of the meeting house, and are mainly 4 feet (1.2 m) high with triangular copings. On the east side is a wooden gate in a section of wall with flat coping, and towards the meeting house the wall is about 8 feet (2.4 m) high with segmental coping.	II
Walls and piers, St Augustine's churchyard 54.81259°N 2.43984°W	—	Undated	At the entrance to the churchyard are low stone walls with chamfered coping. The gate piers are rectangular and have gabled caps and moulded ridges. On the piers are 20th-century wrought iron lamps, and the wooden gates have carved heraldic panels.	II

== Notes and references ==
=== Sources ===
- Historic England, "Killhope Cross, Alston Moor (1326948)", National Heritage List for England
- Historic England, "The Angel Inn, Alston Moor (1326951)", National Heritage List for England
- Historic England, "Former bastle at Low Park, Alston Moor (1487468)", National Heritage List for England
- Historic England, "Randalholme Hall and adjoining byre, Alston Moor (1144984)", National Heritage List for England
- Historic England, "Clarghyll Hall, Alston Moor (1087069)", National Heritage List for England
- Historic England, "Blue Bell Hotel, Alston Moor (1144991)", National Heritage List for England
- Historic England, "Church Gates, Alston Moor (1145002)", National Heritage List for England
- Historic England, "Property adjoining west end of Angel Inn, Alston Moor (1106259)", National Heritage List for England
- Historic England, "Cross View Cottage, Alston Moor (1325978)", National Heritage List for England
- Historic England, "Orchard House, Alston Moor (1144993)", National Heritage List for England
- Historic England, "Quaker Meeting House, Alston Moor (1144960)", National Heritage List for England
- Historic England, "No. 4, adjoining north end of Lyndhurst, Alston Moor (1144992)", National Heritage List for England
- Historic England, "Hillcrest Hotel, Alston Moor (1144989)", National Heritage List for England
- Historic England, "Blackstock's baker's shop, Alston Moor (1106287)", National Heritage List for England
- Historic England, "Property adjoining east end of Blackstock's baker's shop, Alston Moor (1326974)", National Heritage List for England
- Historic England, "House adjoining south end of Blue Bell Hotel, Alston Moor (1326943)", National Heritage List for England
- Historic England, "Corner house adjoining house to south of Blue Bell Hotel, Alston Moor (1144990)", National Heritage List for England
- Historic England, "The Cottage, Alston Moor (1106380)", National Heritage List for England
- Historic England, "Property adjoining east end of Cross View Cottage, Alston Moor (1326973)", National Heritage List for England
- Historic England, "Gossipgate bridge to south-west of Gossipgate House, Alston Moor (1332956)", National Heritage List for England
- Historic England, "H. Kearton's shops adjoining west end of Cross View Cottage, Alston Moor (1144969)", National Heritage List for England
- Historic England, "Ivy House Farmhouse and adjoining byre, Alston Moor (1144966)", National Heritage List for England
- Historic England, "Forecourt walls, gate and end piers to Ivy House Farmhouse, Alston Moor (1144967)", National Heritage List for England
- Historic England, "Lyndhurst, Alston Moor (1087003)", National Heritage List for England
- Historic England, "Property on corner at west end of street, Alston Moor (1145001)", National Heritage List for England
- Historic England, "Property adjoining to south of Midland Bank, Alston Moor (1144970)", National Heritage List for England
- Historic England, "Property occupied by the Sunderland Building Society, Alston Moor (1145004)", National Heritage List for England
- Historic England, "Monument View, area railings and gate, Alston Moor (1326944)", National Heritage List for England
- Historic England, "House adjoining north end of Monument View, Alston Moor (1086939)", National Heritage List for England
- Historic England, "House adjoining south end of Monument View, Alston Moor (1087011)", National Heritage List for England
- Historic England, "Sun House, adjoining north end of Orchard House, Alston Moor (1104921)", National Heritage List for England
- Historic England, "Congregational Chapel, Alston Moor (1144972)", National Heritage List for England
- Historic England, "Market Cross, Alston Moor (1325968)", National Heritage List for England
- Historic England, "Bird-house to east of Clarghyll Hall, Alston Moor (1326962)", National Heritage List for England
- Historic England, "High Mill, Alston Moor (1419977)", National Heritage List for England
- Historic England, "Drystone forecourt walls and piers to front of Clarghyll Hall, Alston Moor (1144982)", National Heritage List for England
- Historic England, "Bridge House, Alston Moor (1144964)", National Heritage List for England
- Historic England, "Four Pines, Alston Moor (1144963)", National Heritage List for England
- Historic England, "Lowbyer Manor Hotel, Alston Moor (1326945)", National Heritage List for England
- Historic England, "The Shieling, Alston Moor (1144962)", National Heritage List for England
- Historic England, "South Tyne House and part of the former Alston Brewery, Alston Moor (1144988)", National Heritage List for England
- Historic England, "Loaning Foot House, Alston Moor (1326972)", National Heritage List for England
- Historic England, "Lowbyer Manor Farmhouse, Alston Moor (1144994)", National Heritage List for England
- Historic England, "Third house from west end of road, Alston Moor (1144973)", National Heritage List for England
- Historic England, "Vicarage and adjoining stables, Alston Moor (1106250)", National Heritage List for England
- Historic England, "Ivy House, Alston Moor (1107214)", National Heritage List for England
- Historic England, "No. 1 Dene Terrace, Alston Moor (1107220)", National Heritage List for England
- Historic England, "Former Powder Magazine 150 metres South West of Chapel Houses, Alston Moor (1144925)", National Heritage List for England
- Historic England, "The Gatehouse, Alston Moor (1326653)", National Heritage List for England
- Historic England, "Garage and garden walls to Loaning Foot House, Alston Moor (1144968)", National Heritage List for England
- Historic England, "Milestone set into rounded corner of wall to west of Town Hall, Alston Moor (1326952)", National Heritage List for England
- Historic England, "Milestone to south-west of Skelgillrigg, Alston Moor (1144996)", National Heritage List for England
- Historic England, "Milestone to north of Hudgillrigg, Alston Moor (1104911)", National Heritage List for England
- Historic England, "Milestone to north of Woodbrae, Alston Moor (1326947)", National Heritage List for England
- Historic England, "Milestone to north-east of Hilltop, Alston Moor (1104870)", National Heritage List for England
- Historic England, "Milestone to north of Whitehouse, Alston Moor (1104894)", National Heritage List for England
- Historic England, "Milestone to west of Clargillhead, Alston Moor (1144995)", National Heritage List for England
- Historic England, "Milestone to north-east of Hartside Cottages, Alston Moor (1144986)", National Heritage List for England
- Historic England, "Milestone to south-west of Hartside House, Alston Moor (1144985)", National Heritage List for England
- Historic England, "Milestone to west of Rise Head, Alston Moor (1144999)", National Heritage List for England
- Historic England, "Milestone to east of Ashgillside, Alston Moor (1326265)", National Heritage List for England
- Historic England, "Milestone to east of Bunkershill, Alston Moor (1326949)", National Heritage List for England
- Historic England, "Milestone to east of Over Lee House, Alston Moor (1145000)", National Heritage List for England
- Historic England, "Milestone to south of Ladygill Bridge, Alston Moor (1326950)", National Heritage List for England
- Historic England, "Milestone half-way between Darngill and Crookburn bridges, Alston Moor (1105661)", National Heritage List for England
- Historic England, "Gilderdale Bridge, Alston Moor (1104899)", National Heritage List for England
- Historic England, "Claim stone in corner of field circa lOOO yards north-east of Blagillhead farmhouse, Alston Moor (1145020)", National Heritage List for England
- Historic England, "Harbut Lodge, Alston Moor (1252966)", National Heritage List for England
- Historic England, "Boundary stone circa 1600 yards south-west of Nenthead in field on south side of road, Alston Moor (1335853)", National Heritage List for England
- Historic England, "The Beeches, Alston Moor (1332960)", National Heritage List for England
- Historic England, "Boundary stone to east of Bunkershill, Alston Moor (1326261)", National Heritage List for England
- Historic England, "Boundary stone circa 2000 yards south-east of Nenthead in field on north side of road, Alston Moor (1326961)", National Heritage List for England
- Historic England, "Milestone to south-west of Newshield, Alston Moor (1326946)", National Heritage List for England
- Historic England, "Milestone to east of Bayles, Alston Moor (1144987)", National Heritage List for England
- Historic England, "Milestone to north-east of High Annat Walls, Alston Moor (1144998)", National Heritage List for England
- Historic England, "H. Kearton & Sons store, Alston Moor (1326976)", National Heritage List for England
- Historic England, "Station House, Alston Moor (1325522)", National Heritage List for England
- Historic England, "Reading room, adjoining west end of Ivy House, Alston Moor (1144971)", National Heritage List for England
- Historic England, "Town Hall, Library, and Trustee Savings Bank, Alston Moor (1106388)", National Heritage List for England
- Historic England, "Church of St Augustine, Alston Moor (1106230)", National Heritage List for England
- Historic England, "Nenthead Methodist Church, Alston Moor (1408095)", National Heritage List for England
- Historic England, "Memorial pump and canopy, Alston Moor (1144997)", National Heritage List for England
- Historic England, "Former Carlisle and Cumberland Bank and bank manager's house, Alston Moor (1481494)", National Heritage List for England
- Historic England, "Alston War Memorial, Alston Moor (1463516)", National Heritage List for England
- Historic England, "Nenthall War Memorial, Alston Moor (1467848)", National Heritage List for England
- Historic England, "Forecourt walls to front of Bridge House, Four Pines, and The Shieling, Alston Moor (1144965)", National Heritage List for England
- Historic England, "Burial ground walls and wooden gate to Congregational Chapel, Alston Moor (1107191)", National Heritage List for England
- Historic England, "Forecourt Walls, gate piers, and central gate to front of Ivy House, Alston Moor (1326975)", National Heritage List for England
- Historic England, "Walls to burial ground in front of Quaker Meeting House, Alston Moor (1144961)", National Heritage List for England
- Historic England, "Walls and gates to St Augustine's churchyard entrance, Alston Moor (1145003)", National Heritage List for England
- Historic England, Listed Buildings
- Hyde, Matthew; Pevsner, Nikolaus (2010) [1967], Cumbria, The Buildings of England, New Haven and London: Yale University Press, ISBN 978-0-300-12663-1
