= Kenneth Allott =

Irish poet

Kenneth Cyril Bruce Allott (29 August 1912 – 23 May 1973) was an Anglo-Irish poet and academic, and authority on Matthew Arnold.

== Life ==
Allott was the elder son of Hubert Cyril Willoughby Allott and his wife Rose (née Finlay). Born in Glamorgan, where his father, a doctor, was serving as a locum, Allott was raised at Nenthead, Cumbria, and later experienced the break-up of his parents' marriage, followed by the death of his mother. After she died he and his brother Guy were adopted by their Irish aunts on Tyneside, and from the age of 14 attended St Cuthbert's Roman Catholic Grammar School in Newcastle on Tyne. Despite the fact that the VI Form then taught only science for Higher School Certificate, he studied English and Latin on his own. In 1934, he gained a first at Armstrong College, Durham University, in Newcastle. He married Surya Kumari Lall in 1936. His first was followed by post-graduate research at Oxford University.

Subsequently, Allott began working as a reviewer for the Morning Post and with Geoffrey Grigson on New Verse, to which he was a regular contributor. He also worked as an observer for Charles Madge's social survey group Mass Observation. In 1942 Allott, a conscientious objector, moved with his family to Gateshead for a year as an extramural lecturer.

After his first marriage ended in 1950, he married another lecturer, Miriam Farris, on 1 June 1951.

Allott is the author of a biography of Jules Verne and two collections of poems (see works below), a critical edition of William Habington's poems, and a play adapted from E. M. Forster's novel A Room with a View.

He held positions at Liverpool University from 1948 until his death in 1973, at which time he was the Andrew Cecil Bradley Professor of Modern English Literature. His position at Liverpool was taken over by his wife after his death until 1981, when she was appointed a professor at Birkbeck College.

== Works ==
His poetry was published in Poems (1938, Hogarth Press), and The Ventriloquist's Doll (1943, Cresset Press). Perhaps his best-known poem was 'Lament for a Cricket Eleven'. He was regarded by many as one of the most promising poets of the day; Francis Scarfe devoted a whole chapter to him in Auden and After. Allott became general editor of the five-volume Pelican Book of English Prose (1956) and of the Oxford History of English Literature. His familiar yellow anthology The Penguin Book of Contemporary Verse (1950; revised and enlarged 1962) was used widely in colleges. Inspector Wexford has been seen reading it on television.

Allott published Selected poems of Winthrop Mackworth Praed (1953); Five Uncollected Essays of Matthew Arnold (1953); and The Poems of Matthew Arnold (1965). He also published Robert Browning: Selected Poems (1967).

Allott's Collected Poems was published posthumously in 1975. He was a witty and popular lecturer, with a great affection for cats. He also smoked heavily, believing wrongly that an earlier bout of tuberculosis would confer protection. He did in fact die of lung cancer.

A new revised and expanded edition of Allott's Collected Poems, edited, introduced and annotated by Michael Murphy], was published in 2008.
