= Alston Moor =

Civil parish in Cumbria, England

Coordinates: 54.812°N 2.441°W

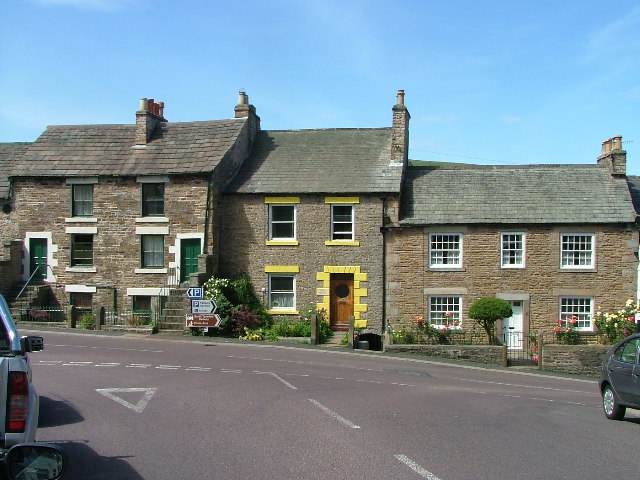
- Alston

- Location in Eden, Cumbria Location within Cumbria
- Population: 2,088 (2011)
- OS grid reference: NY7146
- Civil parish: Alston Moor
- Unitary authority: Westmorland and Furness
- Ceremonial county: Cumbria
- Region: North West
- Country: England
- Sovereign state: United Kingdom
- Post town: ALSTON
- Postcode district: CA9
- Dialling code: 01434
- Police: Cumbria
- Fire: Cumbria
- Ambulance: North West
- UK Parliament: Penrith and Solway

Alston with Garrigill
- History
  - Created: 1894
  - Abolished: 1974
  - Succeeded by: District of Eden
- Status: Rural district
  - HQ: Alston Town Hall

Alston Moor, formerly known as Alston with Garrigill, is a civil parish and electoral ward in the Westmorland and Furness district, in the ceremonial county of Cumbria, England, based around the small town of Alston. It is set in the moorlands of the North Pennines, mostly at an altitude of over 1000 feet. The parish/ward had a population of 2,088 at the 2011 census. As well as the town of Alston, the parish includes the villages of Garrigill and Nenthead, along with the hamlets of Nenthall, Nentsberry, Galligill, Blagill, Ashgill, Leadgate, Bayles and Raise. Alston Moor is part of the North Pennines Area of Outstanding Natural Beauty (AONB), the second largest of the 40 AONBs in England and Wales.

Under the Local Government Act 1894, the parish, then known as Alston with Garrigill, which had previously been a rural sanitary district on its own, became one of the few single-parish rural districts. This remained in existence until 1974 when it became part of the Eden district. On 18 June 1974 the parish was renamed from "Alston with Garrigill" to "Alston Moor". The parish is divided into the wards of Alston (which includes Leadgate), Garrigill and Nenthead. Eden District was abolished in 2023 and the parish is now administered as part of the Westmorland and Furness unitary authority area.

The area is drained by the River South Tyne whose source is located in the fells above Garrigill and also by the Rivers Nent and Black Burn which, along with many other smaller streams, flow into the Tyne. The Rivers Tees and Wear also have their sources on the borders of the parish.

== History ==
Alston Moor originally lay within the Liberty of Tynedale in the county of Northumberland. It was later transferred to Cumberland by the Normans when lead mines were established in the region by Carlisle merchants.

The manor of Alston or Alston Moor changed hands several times until the 17th century when it passed to the Radcliffe family who held the title Earl of Derwentwater, but after their part in the failed 1715 Jacobite rising their lands were confiscated by the Government, who assigned it to the Admiralty to support the Royal Hospital for Seamen at Greenwich in London. In 1768, the Commissioners of Greenwich Hospital established a lead smelting works at Langley to smelt their ore from Alston Moor.

Greenwich Hospital remained the principal landowner in the parish and owner of the extensive mineral rights up until the 1960s. The estate was then transferred to the Trustees for Catholic Purposes who in the 1990s sold their remaining properties in Alston Moor.

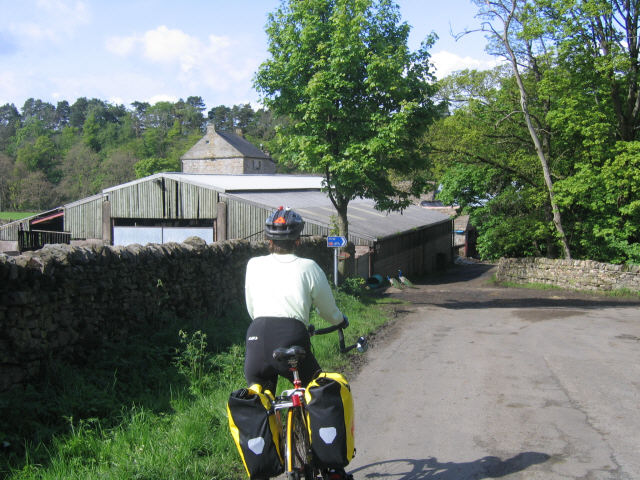
Randalhome Hall

The poet W. H. Auden was to travel a great deal in Britain and abroad, but it is the wild region between the River Tees and Hadrian's Wall which provides the backdrop to many of his poems and plays of the '20s and '30s, and echoes at intervals throughout his life. In America in 1947, an Ordnance Survey map of Alston Moor hung on the wall of Auden's chaotic shack on Fire Island.

According to his brother John, Auden came to love Alston Moor more than any other place. The poem entitled 'Alston Moor' dates from 1924, as does 'Allendale'.

Close to the River South Tyne, 2 miles north of Alston, lies Randalholme Hall, a 17th-century house incorporating a fourteenth-century pele tower.

To the south of Garrigill is the district of Priorsdale which was at one time regarded as separate to the rest of the manor of Alston Moor and was divided into the liberties of Eshgill or Ashgill, The Hill and The Hole which were further subdivided into other properties. Priorsdale was so named as it was originally given to the Priors of Hexham Abbey but passed to the Crown after the Dissolution of the Monasteries who gave it to the Lawson family, though most of it eventually became part of the Greenwich Hospital estate.

The principal Anglican church is St Augustine's in Alston, which along with the churches at Garrigill and Nenthead both dedicated to St John and three churches over the county border in Northumberland make up the Team Parish of Alston Moor within the Diocese of Newcastle. Officially Garrigill and Nenthead are separate ecclesiastical parishes, although Garrigill used to be a chapelry of the parish of Alston-cum-Garrigill, and it is believed it may have at one time been connected with Kirkland on the other side of Cross Fell.

== Mineral wealth ==
Alston Moor had some of the largest deposits of lead and zinc ores in Britain. Lead was probably mined in Roman times. The Romans built a fort at Whitley Castle, known to the Romans as Epiacum, and pieces of lead ore and slag have been found there, though few other traces of their work remain. There are various references to the mines of the area between the 12th and 16th centuries. Most emphasise the value of the silver, which makes up a small (<1%) proportion of the lead ore. This made the mines of interest to the Crown, who charged rents on the silver production. When Sir Edward Radcliffe, Earl of Derwentwater bought the estate in 1629 for £2,500, the mines were believed to be virtually exhausted.

From the 18th century Greenwich Hospital leased the rights to mine for lead and other minerals to a number of companies. The most significant of these was the London Lead Company, but other smaller companies and partnerships also took on leases, with varying degrees of success. The London Lead Company's work led to Alston Moor becoming one of the main lead producing areas in the country by the mid-19th century, especially around Nenthead. The population of the area rose to a peak of around 5,000 in this period. By the 1860s, cheaper imports were making the local lead industry unprofitable, and by 1896 the leases had passed to the Vieille Montagne company, who worked the mines for zinc, which had earlier been of little commercial value.

The 20th century saw a gradual decline in mining and the prosperity it had brought to the area. Little remained of the industry after World War II. Today the remains of the smelt mill at Nenthead Mines can be seen. A few of the old mines are accessible but must only be explored with expert guidance. The traces of hundreds of other small mines, shafts and spoil heaps are merging into the landscape.

== Golf ==
Alston Moor is home to England's highest golf course. The Golf Club was founded in 1905 and has occupied numerous sites over the years. The first course was at Black House Farm, but the course is now located on the Hermitage Farm site. The official opening was on Easter Monday 1906, although there is evidence that a club was in existence for quite some time before this date.

== See also ==
- Listed buildings in Alston Moor

== Sources ==
- Smailes, AE (1960). North England. Edinburgh: Thomas Nelson & Sons Ltd.

== Related websites ==
- Cybermoor community website with news, comment, webcams and information about Alston Moor
- Alston Moor Newsletter
