= Allotment =

Allotment may refer to:

- Allotment (Dawes Act), an area of land held by the US Government for the benefit of an individual Native American, under the Dawes Act of 1887
- Allotment (finance), a method by which a company allocates over-subscribed shares
- Allotment (gardening), an area of land rented out for non-commercial gardening or farming
- Allotment (travel industry), a block of pre-negotiated carrier seats or hotel rooms held by a travel organizer
- Allotment of the Promised Land by Joshua; see Book of Joshua#Division of the land (chapters 13–22)
- Sortition or allotment, a method of selection by lottery
- The Allotment, a 1988 book by Colin Ward

== See also ==
- Allod, a type of property holding in the Middle Ages and early Modern Period
