= Allotment (travel industry) =

Used to designate a certain block of pre-negotiated carrier seats or hotel rooms

Allotments in the tourism industry are used to designate a certain block of pre-negotiated carrier seats or hotel rooms which have been bought out and held by a travel organizer with a huge buying power like a wholesaler, tour operator or hotel consolidator, and more rarely by a retail travel agent.

Allotments can be purchased for a specific period of time such as a whole season, part of a season or for any single dates and then resold to travel partners and final customers around the globe. A couple of days prior to carrier departure/hotel check-in any unsold seats/rooms may be released back to the supplier if such an agreement exists between the two parties. An allotment release back period is also negotiated as part of the allotment contract (e.g. four days prior to check-in/departure).

== Negotiating allotments ==
Allotments can be negotiated between a tour operator and a travel service supplier such as airline company/hotel chain, or between two travel organizers such as a tour operator and a retail travel agent. Either way the buyer needs to prove a consistent level of business, because allotments are hardly granted without any previous sales history.

Rooms or seats that have not been contracted between the travel company and the product supplier are handled as ‘on-request’, where each booking of an airline seat or hotel room needs to be confirmed with the supplier before being confirmed with the client.

== The allotment or allocation contract ==
The amount of the contracted rooms/seats to be specified in the allotment contract is a result of the estimated, during the negotiation, volume of sales to be realized by the tour operator. Tour operators book a certain number of rooms in hotels or seats on carriers and have the right to use them by a given date, also known as a release date, that usually is some days prior to tourist's arrival (hotels)/departure (carriers). The allotment contract reduces the risk of any unsold products by the supplier and grants relative price advantage to the travel organizer helping him to stay competitive on the market by offering extra discounts.

Tour operators obtain discounts, through allotment or commitment contracts, primarily depend on the firm size and the bargaining power exercised; they can vary from 10% to 50% according to the period of the year, the destination, the quantity and quality of services contracted upon. Some big tour operators are able to obtain up to 70% of discount.
