= Alston Town Hall =

Municipal building in Alston, Cumbria, England

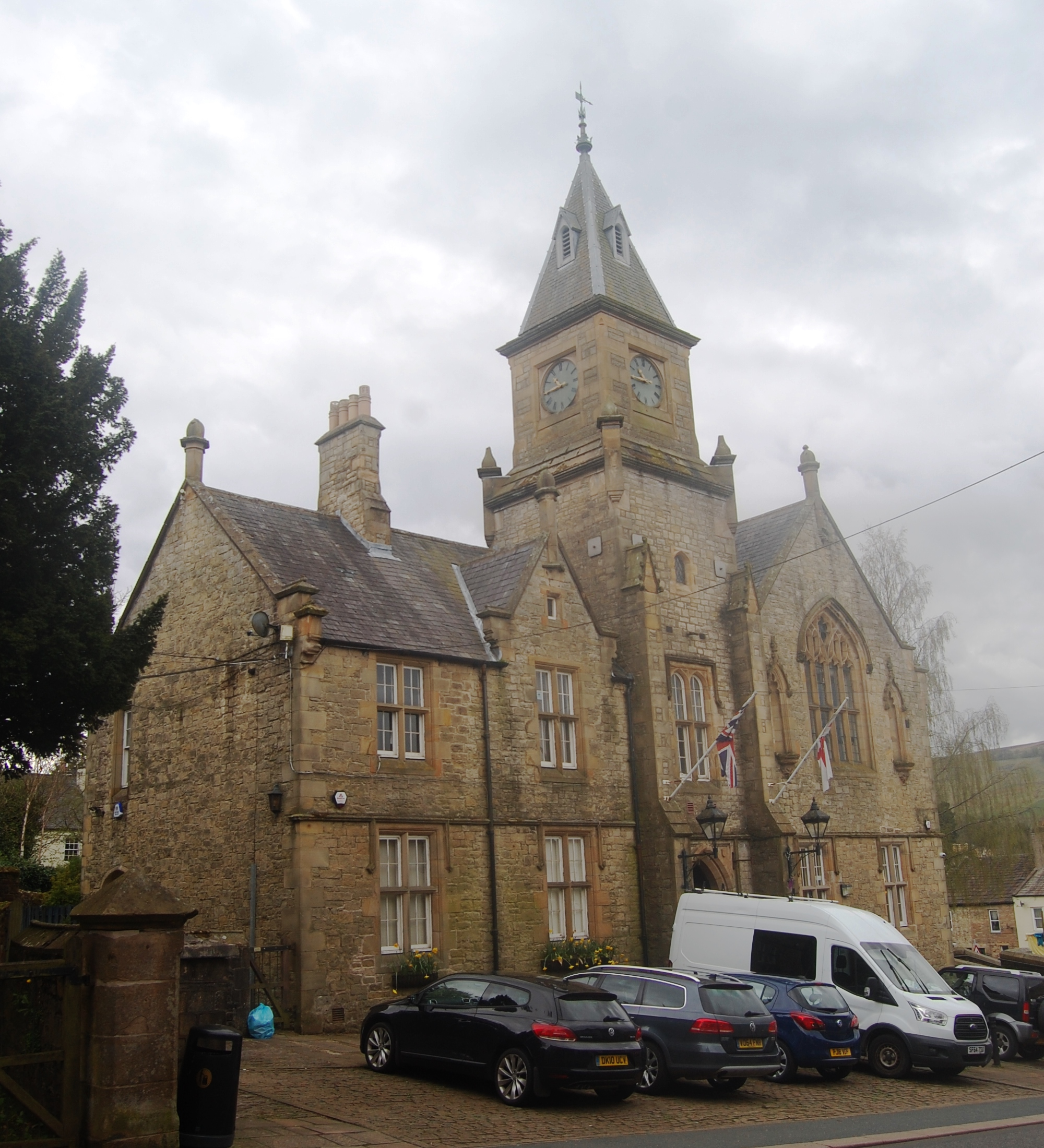
- Alston Town Hall

- Shown in Cumbria
- 54.8124°N 2.4408°W
- Location: Front Street, Alston

History
- Built: 1858

Site notes
- Architect: Alfred Burdakin Higham
- Architectural style: Gothic Revival style

Listed Building – Grade II
- Official name: Town Hall, Library and Trustee Savings Bank
- Designated: 14 May 1984
- Reference no.: 1106388

Alston Town Hall is a municipal building in Front Street, Alston, Cumbria, England. The town hall, which is currently used as a public library, is a Grade II listed building.

== History ==
The construction of the building was an initiative by the locally-born industrial chemist, Hugh Lee Pattinson, to create an events venue in the town. It was built and financed by a specially formed company for which he was one of the largest subscribers. The site chosen was a large rectangular piece of land known as the Vicarage Croft, which was donated to the company by the trustees of Greenwich Hospital. (Note: The hospital had been a major landowner in the area since the estates of the local lord of the manor, James Radclyffe, 3rd Earl of Derwentwater, had been confiscated by the crown in the aftermath of the Jacobite rising of 1715 and granted to the hospital for the benefit of seamen.)

The foundation stone for the new building was laid by Pattinson in 1857. It was designed by Alfred Burdakin Higham of Newcastle upon Tyne in the Gothic Revival style, built in rubble masonry at a cost of £2,000 and completed in 1858. The design involved an asymmetrical main frontage with five bays facing onto Front Street; the third bay from the left was formed by a four-stage clock tower with an arched doorway in the first stage, a two-light mullioned and transomed window in the second stage, a small rectangular window in the third stage and a square turret with clock faces in the fourth stage: the tower was surmounted by a pyramid-shaped roof. The quarter-chiming clock was manufactured by T. Cooke & Sons of York; it struck the hours on one bell and the quarters on two smaller bells. The second and fourth bays were gabled and the fourth bay featured a large four-light mullioned and transomed window with tracery: the window was flanked by niches. Internally, the principal rooms were the main assembly hall, a courtroom, facilities for the local mechanics' institute and a reading room.

Following significant population growth, largely associated with the status of Alston as a market town, the area became a rural district with the town hall as its headquarters in 1894. The town hall continued to serve as the headquarters of the rural district council for much of the 20th century, but ceased to be the local seat of government when the enlarged Eden District Council which was formed in 1974.

The building subsequently became home to the local tourist information office and also accommodated a branch of the Trustee Savings Bank until the mid 1980s, while the local public library, which had relocated to the Market Place, returned to the town hall in 2008.

== See also ==
- Listed buildings in Alston Moor
