= London Lead Company =

British lead mining company

The London Lead Company was an 18th and 19th century British lead mining company. It was incorporated by royal charter. Strictly, it was The Company for Smelting Down Lead with Pitcoal.

== Origins ==
The company was chartered in 1692 to investors who intended to acquire the lead-smelting works (reverberatory furnaces) of Talbot Clerke, the son of Sir Clement Clerke near Bristol. This apparently did not prove a success, and the company returned the works in 1695 to Talbot Clerke (by then Sir Talbot).

Another group of entrepreneurs, of whom Dr Edward Wright was a leading member, obtained leases in Cumberland in 1693. This, known as Estourt's Copper or Mines Royal Copper was floated as an unincorporated company in 1693. This company, many of whose members were Quakers, is not to be confused with the Society of Mines Royal, which was by then largely moribund. It acquired lead mines in Flintshire from Lethicullier's Copper Company (another unincorporated venture) in 1695. This proved more successful. In 1704, the owners acquired the charter of the defunct The Company for Smelting Down Lead with Pitcoal, and transferred their business to it. The following year, this also took over the Ryton Company, which had reverberatory furnaces at Ryton on Tyne and lead mines on Alston Moor.

== Teesdale ==
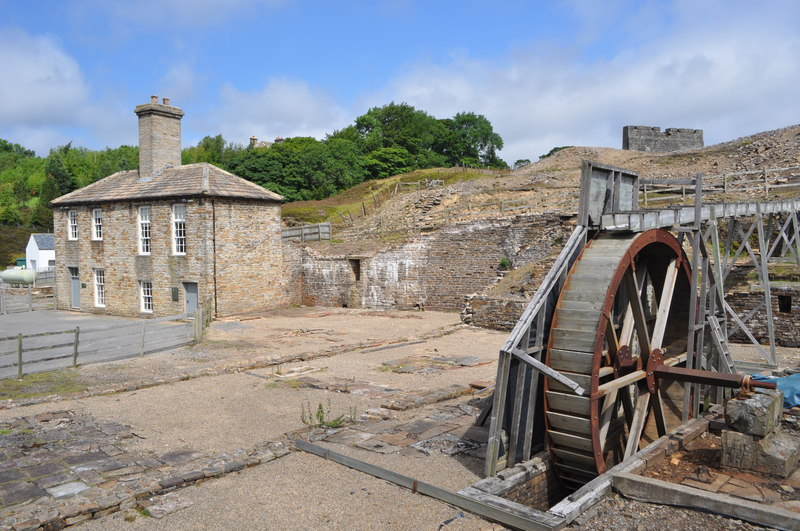
Nenthead smelt mill in 2011

The London Lead Company started its Teesdale operations in 1753 when it took a lease on a mine at Newbiggin in Teesdale. This gradually expanded to a further 18 miles and a smelting mill at Eggleston.

In 1815 the company moved its headquarters to Middleton-in-Teesdale where it built Middleton House, the impressive headquarters of the company.

The Company had Quaker origins and tried to provide for its workers who suffered appalling conditions underground and working with the ore.

In Middleton they built company houses (Newtown). A contemporary writer described the part of Middleton built by the Company: "Masterman Place or as it is sometimes called, New-Middleton, was erected in 1833 by the London Lead Company from the chaste and appropriate design of Mr. Bonomi, and under the direction of Robert Stagg. It consists of several uniform rows of neat and convenient cottages, situated in a spacious garden, a portion of which was appropriated to each dwelling. The increasing population of Middleton had considerably enhanced the rents of dwelling houses there, and it was to diminish this burden that the Company built Masterman Place, in which, as vacancies occur, they place their most deserving workmen, thus combining general utility with the reward of personal merit. The first occupiers took possession of their new abodes in May 1824, accompanied by bands of music, etc." Temperance was required by the company in their new houses.

By 1890 the company was starting to suffer from competition, both from other materials and imports. From 1895 onwards the Company slowly scaled down its whole mining enterprise, partly due to the age of the main members of the board, or court, but mainly due to the rapidly shrinking lead market at the time. The Company finally wound up in 1905, selling the mines to the Vieille Montagne Company who worked them for zinc up until the Second World War.

Many details about Lead Mining in the NE of England are available from Killhope Mining Museum in Weardale.
