= Miriam Allott =

English literary scholar (1920–2010)

- Prof. Allott
- Born: 1920; Fulham, London, England
- Died: 2010 (aged 89–90); Liverpool, England
- Occupation: Professor
- Employers: Liverpool University; Birkbeck College

Miriam Allott or Miriam Farris; Miriam Farris Allott; Miriam Allott-Farris (1920–2010) was an English literary scholar. She was a professor in Liverpool and at Birkbeck College.

== Life ==
Allott was born in Cairo or Fulham in 1920. This was just after her father Labib Farris who was an Egyptian medical student and her mother Ada Violet Rennie married. She studied in Cairo and the Froebel Demonstration School at the same time as Iris Murdoch. She then went to Liverpool University. After her degree in general studies she taught and studied for a doctorate in English literature on Henry James. She was supervised by her future husband, Kenneth Allott. She became a lecturer in Liverpool University in 1948.

Her husband's first marriage ended in 1950 and she married him on 1 June 1951. His position as the Andrew Cecil Bradley Professor of Modern English Literature at Liverpool University was taken over by his wife after his death; by 1981 she was a professor at Birkbeck College.

Allott died in Liverpool in 2010. She had published a selection of Keats' poetry and Novelists on the Novel in 1959. She left her wealth to fund a lecturer at Liverpool University. She was also a collector and left her collections to the university and its own Victoria Gallery and Museum.
