= Allot Ltd. =

Israeli telecommunications company

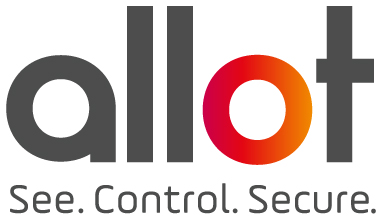
- Formerly: Allot Communications
- Type: Public
- Traded as: Nasdaq: ALLT; TASE: ALLT
- Industry: Telecommunication
- Founded: 1996; 30 years ago
- Headquarters: Hod HaSharon, Israel
- Key people: David Reis (chairman); Eyal Harari (CEO)
- Products: Mass Market SECaaS; Network Security Solutions; Network Visibility; Traffic Management; Policy & Charging Control; Regulatory Compliance; QoE & Application Control; Web Security; Behavior Anomaly Detection
- Revenue: US$ 102 million (2025)
- Total equity: US$ 140 million (2024)
- Number of employees: 500
- Website: allot.com

Allot Ltd., formerly Allot Communications, is an Israeli high-tech company that develops telecommunications software. The company is headquartered in Hod Hasharon, Israel.

== History ==
Allot was founded in 1996, by Michael Shurman and Yigal Jacoby. By 2004, the company raised $38 million in several rounds of funding from several venture capital funds. In November 2006, it became a publicly traded company on the Nasdaq Global Market under the ticker symbol ALLT. The IPO raised $78 million. In November 2010, Allot's dual listing on the Tel Aviv Stock Exchange was approved. Allot provides network intelligence and network-based security products for communications service providers (CSPs) of mobile broadband, wireless broadband, mobile satellite service, and DSL carriers, as well as enterprises.

In 2012, Allot acquired San Diego–based Ortiva Wireless, which specializes in optimizing video streaming across wireless networks, and Oversi Networks, a global provider of rich-media caching and content delivery for Internet video and peer-to-peer (P2P) traffic.

In February 2015, Allot acquired Optenet, an IT security company providing Security-as-a-Service products to service providers and enterprises, for $6.5 million.

In 2017, the company appointed Erez Antebi to the position of CEO. At the same time, Allot Communications announced a new collaboration with Intel Security to introduce McAfee Unified Security Powered by Allot, providing complete end-to-end security capabilities. Allot together with Nokia Networks and Swisscom, a telecommunications provider in Switzerland, integrated Allot Cloud Access Optimization platform into Swisscom's data center architecture to support higher performance service delivery to customers.

Also in 2017, Worldwide Flight Services (WFS) implemented Allot's Secure Service Gateway (SSG) unified solution for real-time network intelligence, control and security across their entire network.

In November of that year, Allot and its partner Openet upgraded the Allot Service Gateway service with Allot Service Gateway 9500 (SG-9500) and expanded its deployment across all three TELE-POST business units for enhanced policy control and charging.

In January 2018, the company acquired Netonomy, a developer of software-based cybersecurity for the connected home. In February, Allot was awarded "best mobile security solution" in the 2018 Cybersecurity Excellence Awards. In July, the company signed a distribution agreement with Lifeboat Distribution, the international value-added distributor for emerging technologies and subsidiary of Wayside Technology Group, to supply the Allot Secure Service Gateway (SSG) to its North American Enterprise and ISP customers.

In 2020, Broadcom recommended Allot to its customers after discontinuing the PacketShaper product line, which Broadcom gained when it acquired Symantec. In the same year, Allot expanded partnership with Telefónica and Mc Afee to improve infrastructure for cybersecurity services among Spanish SMEs caused by the rise in remote working since the start of the Covid-19 pandemic.

In January 2021, a new product, Allot DNS Secure, was presented. DNS Secure provides a security solution for customers of for communication service providers (CSPs) and fixed broadband subscribers. In 2021, Dish Network, Eolo, Japan's Asahi Net and Poland's Play selected Allot products for their services.

The company received a $40 million private financing by Lynrock Lake Master Fund LP. In May, Allot signed a partnership with Singtel, a Singaporean telecommunications conglomerate, to offer cybersecurity services to Singtel's Small and Medium Sized Business (SMB) customers.

In 2022, Allot's technology was chosen by Entel Peru, Taiwan's Far EasTone Telecommunications and Ethio Telecom. Verizon has also selected Allot to provide security services.

On May 5, 2026, the Radiant Mobile network was launched on T-Mobile's network, created by Compax Ventures and Allot. It is described as the first Christian mobile carrier and filters content through Allot via the network. Content described as "Jesus-centered" is provided, while certain sexual content is blocked, with some categories allowing adults to unblock content. Content in other categories, such as pornography, racism and self-harm, cannot be accessed by anyone. Compax provided $17.5 million in financing for Radiant parent IT Mobile Services.

== Controversy ==
In 2011, it was reported that equipment sold by Allot has illegally reached Iran. However, in January 2012 Allot was cleared by the Israeli Ministry of Defense of any wrongdoing, as the investigation concluded that the company was unaware that the internet monitoring equipment it sold to the Danish distributor ended up in Iranian hands.
