= Nenthead =

Mining village in Cumbrian hills

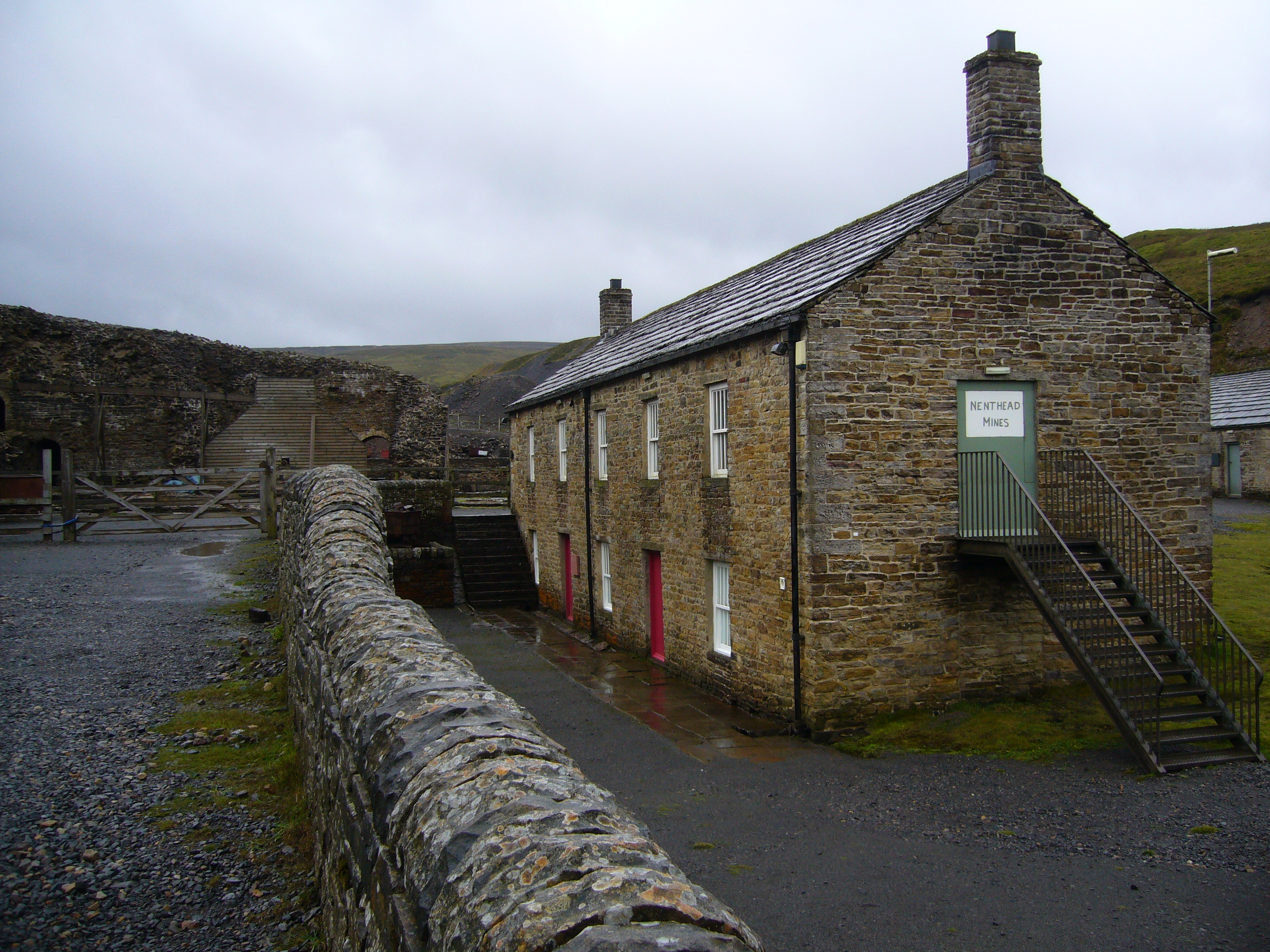
- Nenthead Mines in 2013

- Flag

- Location in Eden, Cumbria Location within Cumbria
- OS grid reference: NY785435
- Civil parish: Alston Moor (Nenthead Ward)
- Unitary authority: Westmorland and Furness
- Ceremonial county: Cumbria
- Region: North West
- Country: England
- Sovereign state: United Kingdom
- Post town: ALSTON
- Postcode district: CA9
- Dialling code: 01434
- Police: Cumbria
- Fire: Cumbria
- Ambulance: North West
- UK Parliament: Penrith and Solway

Nenthead (/ˈnɛnthɛd/ NENT-hed) in the county of Cumbria is one of England's highest villages, at around 1,437 feet (438 m). It was not built until the middle of the 18th century and was one of the earliest purpose-built industrial villages in Britain.

== History ==
Nenthead was a major centre for lead and silver mining in the North Pennines of Britain. The first smelt mill was built at Nenthead in 1737 by George Liddle, and this was subsequently expanded by the London Lead Company. By 1882 the smelt mill was capable of smelting 8,000 bings, i.e., 64,000 long hundredweight (3,300 t), of ore per annum.

Nenthead village in 1861 had 2,000 people, mostly Methodist and employed by the Quaker-owned London Lead Company in the Nenthead Mines - some of the most productive in the country. The Quakers built housing, a school, a reading room, public baths and a wash-house for the miners and their families.

Nenthead has accessible mines remaining, horse whims and a 260 feet (79 m) engine shaft in Rampghill. The mines closed in 1961 and there is a heritage centre displaying their history.

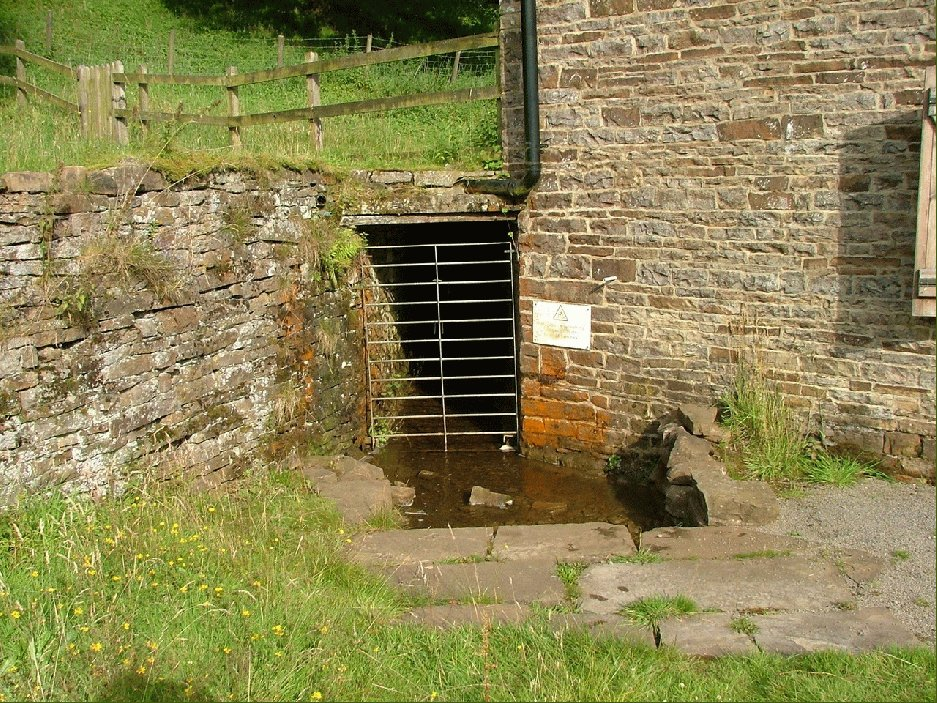
Rampgill Nenthead

The economy of the village relies on tourism. A long distance cycle route, the C2C, passes through Nenthead. The Grade II listed Wesleyan Methodist chapel has not been used since 2002 but benefitted from a Heritage Lottery Grant of £134,500. The post office and community shop occupies the building which was once a reading room for the miners.

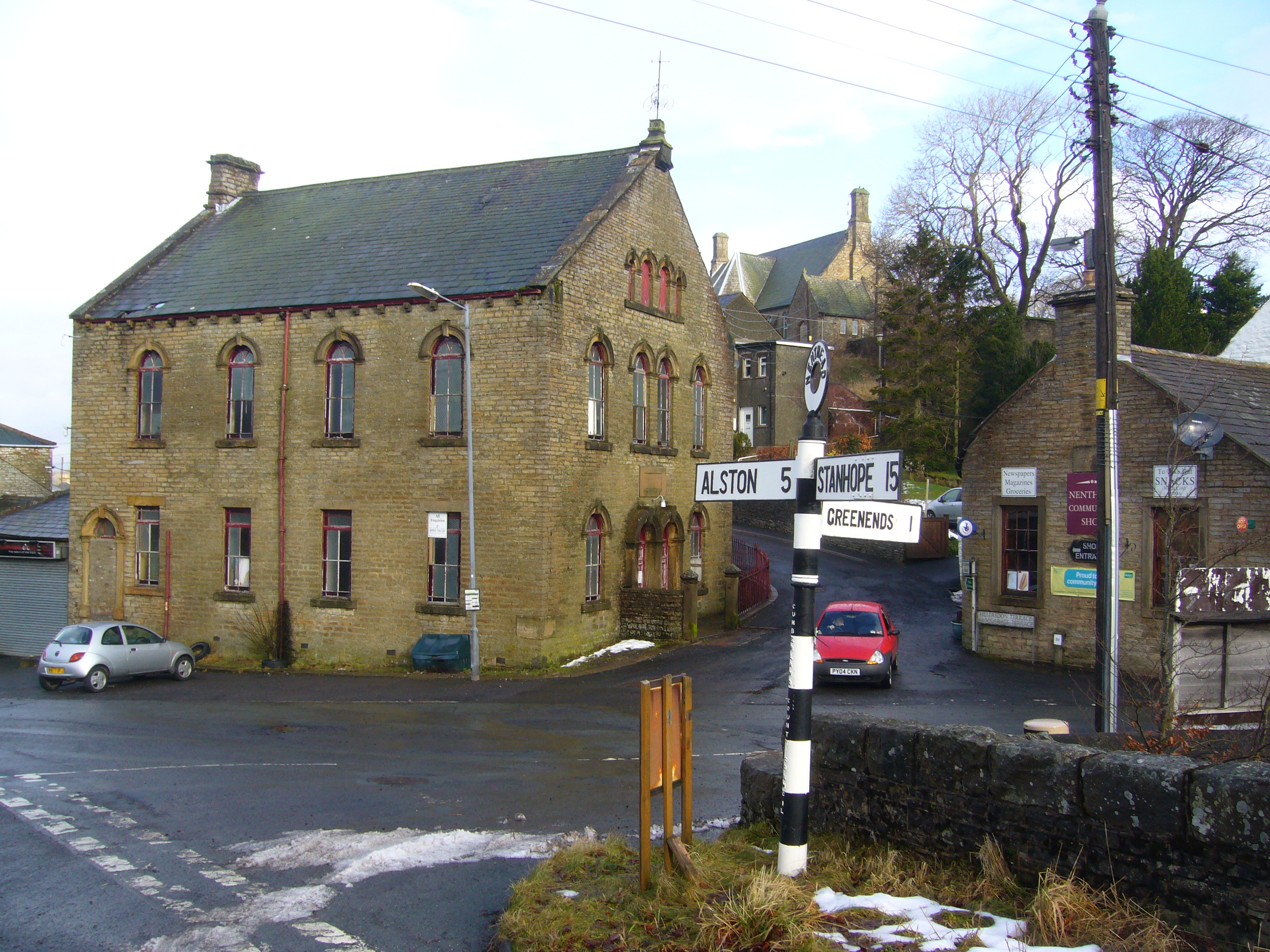
Nenthead old Methodist Chapel in 2014

Nenthead is around 4.4 miles (7.1 km) east of Alston, 44.3 miles (71.3 km) west of Newcastle upon Tyne, 34.4 miles (55.4 km) south east of Carlisle, 24 miles (38.6 km) east of Penrith, and 20.5 miles (33.0 km) west of Hexham.

County Council subsidies have maintained limited bus services to Alston and beyond. However, in 2014 cuts to these subsidies were being discussed, threatening the existence of bus services for the village.

== Governance ==
Nenthead is in the parliamentary constituency of Penrith and Solway.

Before April 2023 for Local Government purposes it was in the Alston Moor Ward of Eden District Council and the Alston and East Fellside Division of Cumbria County Council. Nenthead does not have its own parish council, instead it is part of Alston Moor Parish Council. Since 2023 it has been in the unitary authority District of Westmorland and Furness and the now purely ceremonial county of Cumbria.

== Zinc deposits ==
In 2013 the Canadian mining company Minco sank 1,640 feet (500 m) deep boreholes in an effort to discover the extent of zinc deposits beneath Nenthead. Although test drilling could go on for several years, the company believes that the village may be sited on huge deposits of the chemical element. The zinc is 490 feet (149 m) below the surface and was previously too deep to reach by old mining techniques.

== Climate ==
With a northernly latitude of 55° N and altitude of 1,434 feet (437 m) Amsl, Nenthead has one of the coldest and snowiest climates in England, yielding a borderline subpolar oceanic climate (Cfc) and cool oceanic climate (Cfb). The average annual temperature in Nenthead is 6.5 °C; 1,095 mm of precipitation falls annually, chiefly in winter as heavy snowfall, and in autumn.

Climate data for Nenthead, Cumbria
| Month | Jan | Feb | Mar | Apr | May | Jun | Jul | Aug | Sep | Oct | Nov | Dec | Year |
|---|---|---|---|---|---|---|---|---|---|---|---|---|---|
| Mean daily maximum °C (°F) | 3.3 (37.9) | 3.7 (38.7) | 6.2 (43.2) | 9.2 (48.6) | 12.8 (55.0) | 16.1 (61.0) | 17.4 (63.3) | 16.9 (62.4) | 14.3 (57.7) | 10.9 (51.6) | 6.6 (43.9) | 4.2 (39.6) | 10.1 (50.2) |
| Mean daily minimum °C (°F) | −2.1 (28.2) | −2.0 (28.4) | −0.3 (31.5) | 1.3 (34.3) | 4.1 (39.4) | 7.3 (45.1) | 8.9 (48.0) | 8.5 (47.3) | 6.7 (44.1) | 4.1 (39.4) | 0.6 (33.1) | −1.1 (30.0) | 3.0 (37.4) |
| Average precipitation mm (inches) | 114 (4.5) | 79 (3.1) | 93 (3.7) | 70 (2.8) | 71 (2.8) | 72 (2.8) | 76 (3.0) | 97 (3.8) | 95 (3.7) | 100 (3.9) | 112 (4.4) | 116 (4.6) | 1,095 (43.1) |

== Flag ==
Nenthead village flag

In 2014, vexillologist and heraldicist Philip Tibbetts designed a flag for the village. The flag was officially adopted and registered with the Flag Institute on 11 May 2014. The green triangle on the flag symbolises the top of the River Nent valley, from which the village gets its name. The green triangle also refers to nearby Knowbury Hill as the eastern-most point of the historic county of Cumberland with the green shade used the same as that of the Flag of Cumberland. The eight-pointed star upon the triangle is the Star of Quakerism and refers to the origins of the village. The black and white vertical hoops depict the seams of lead and silver ore that lie beneath the area and upon which the industry of the village was based.

== See also ==
- Listed buildings in Alston Moor
