= Alston, Cumbria =

Town in Cumbria, England

Coordinates: 54.810°N 2.441°W

Alston
- Town
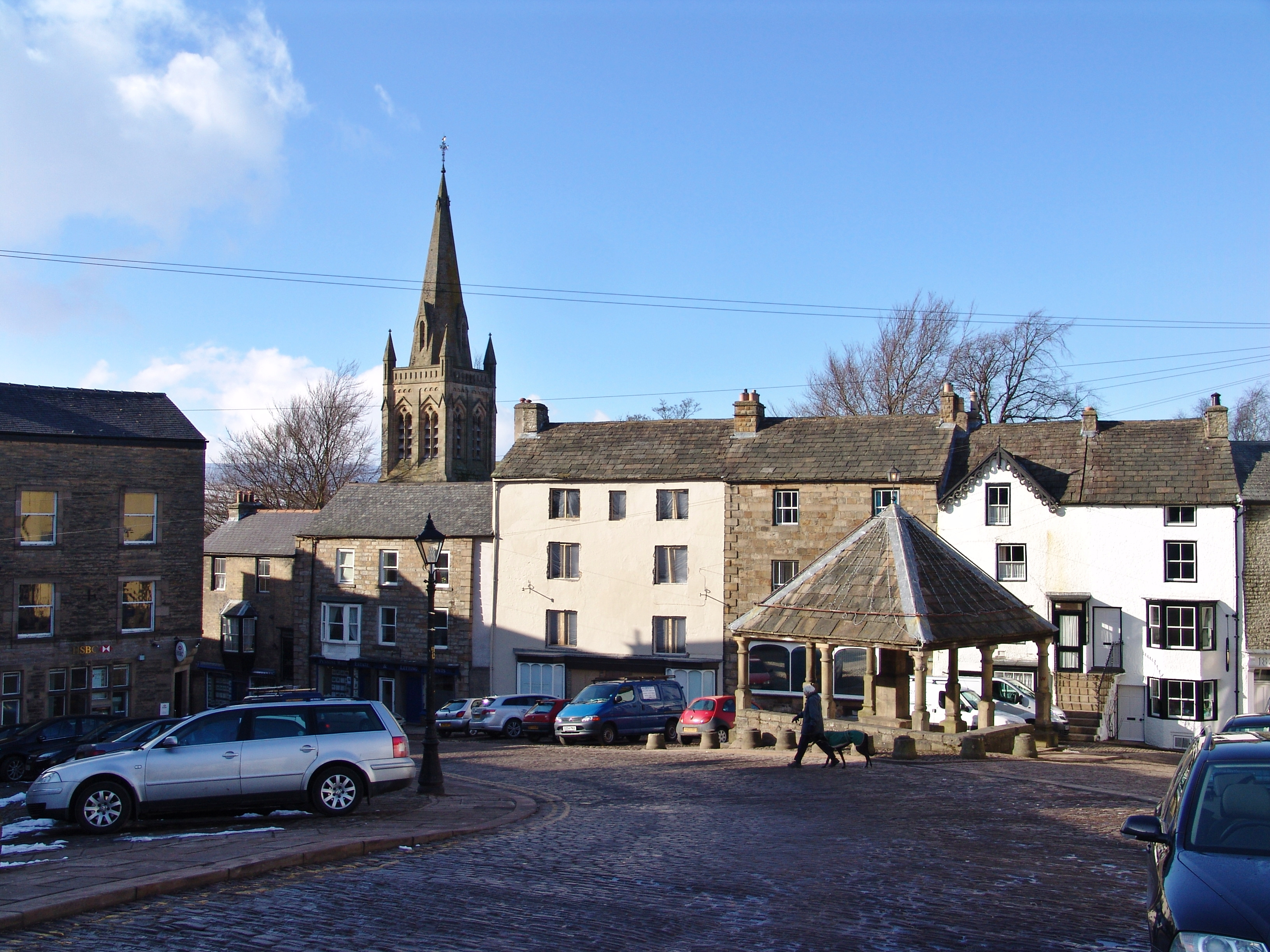
- Alston town centre

- Location in the former Eden District Location within Cumbria
- Population: 1,075 (2021 Census)
- OS grid reference: NY716462
- Civil parish: Alston Moor
- Unitary authority: Westmorland and Furness
- Ceremonial county: Cumbria
- Region: North West
- Country: England
- Sovereign state: United Kingdom
- Post town: ALSTON
- Postcode district: CA9
- Dialling code: 01434
- Police: Cumbria
- Fire: Cumbria
- Ambulance: North West
- UK Parliament: Penrith and Solway

Alston is a town in Westmorland and Furness, Cumbria, England, within the civil parish of Alston Moor. It is located at about 1,000 feet (300 m) above sea level in the North Pennines, the River South Tyne, and shares the title of 'highest market town in England', with Buxton, Derbyshire. Despite its relative isolation, the town has road connections to the Tyne Gap to the north, Weardale and Teesdale to the south-east, and Penrith to the south-west.

Much of the town centre is a designated conservation area which includes several listed buildings. It was historically within the county of Cumberland. Alston was historically a centre for mining, with lead, zinc, iron, copper, and coal found in the vicinity.

== Geography ==
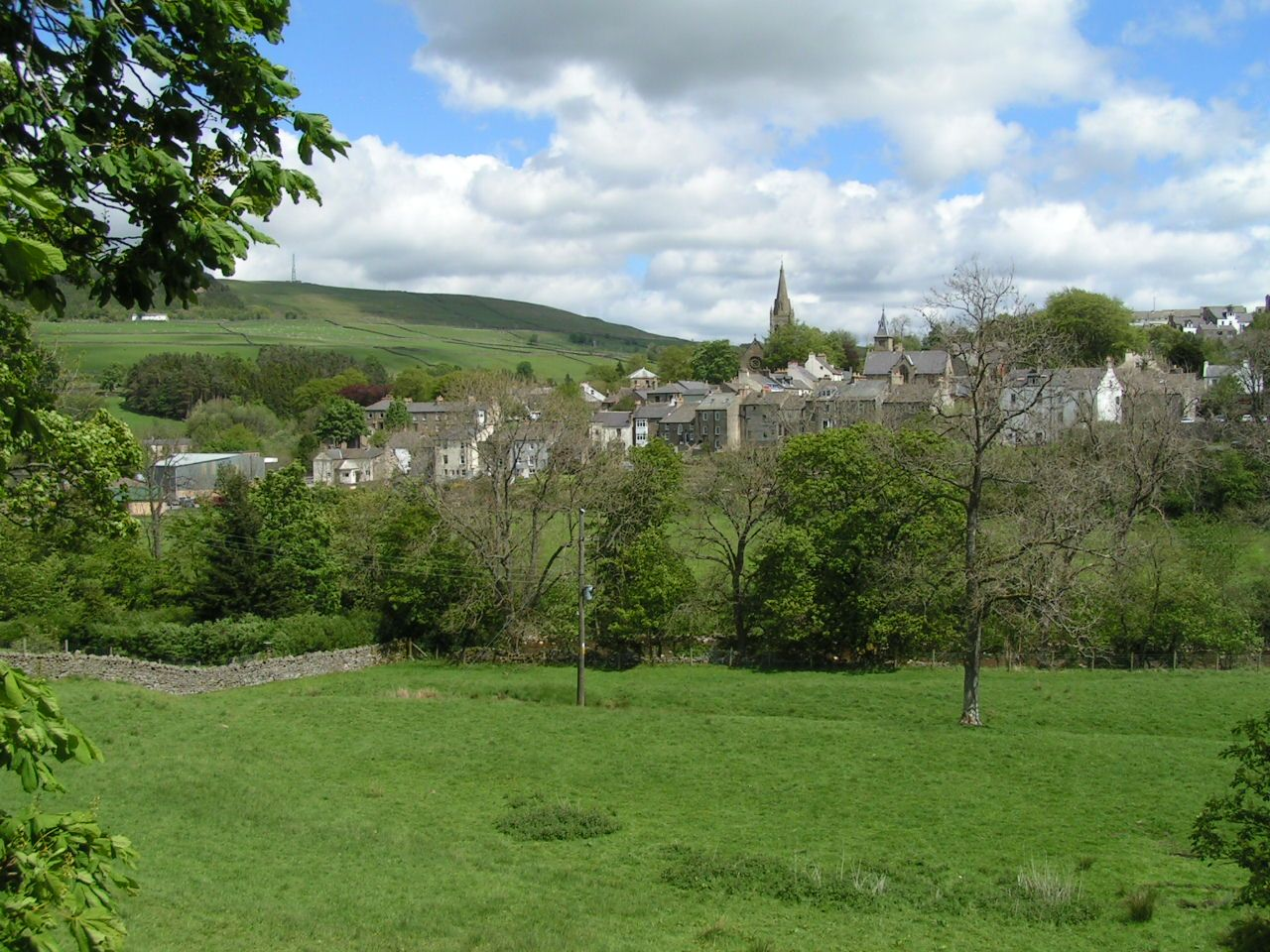
Alston from the west

Alston lies within the North Pennines Area of Outstanding Natural Beauty, more than 16.3 miles (26.2 km) by road from the nearest town, Haltwhistle, and is surrounded by moorland. Nearby villages include Garrigill and Nenthead. It is around 44.5 miles (71.6 km) west of Newcastle upon Tyne, 30.1 miles (48.4 km) south east of Carlisle, 19.7 miles (31.7 km) north east of Penrith, and 21.6 miles (34.8 km) south west of Hexham.

Situated at the crossroads/junction of the A686, A689 and B6277, the town lies on the confluence of the River South Tyne and the River Nent. On 18 May 2013 very heavy rain resulted in flooding in seven areas of Alston, affecting thirty-six properties. The Environment Agency records indicate that 51mm of rain fell that day.

The landscape of the area is built up from limestone, sandstone and shale. The area is rich in minerals, in particular lead deposits, and the landscape has been heavily influenced by the effects of varying methods of mining over the centuries.

=== Climate ===
This town has a cool and relatively rainy oceanic climate (Cfb, according to the Köppen climate classification), with mild summers and chilly winters, with snowfalls. It is one of the coldest and snowiest inhabited places in England.

There are some ski-tows on the northwest slopes of Burnhope Seat, a hill situated 4 miles (6.4 km) away from Alston. This forms the Yad Moss ski facility, which has been upgraded by Sport England.

Alston holds the record for the lowest temperature reported in Cumbria. The temperature fell to −22.8 °C (−9.0 °F) on 17 January 1881. Additionally, the town also holds the record for the lowest temperature ever reported on 7 March in the United Kingdom, at −18.9 °C (−2.0 °F) in 1886. This was also the coldest temperature reported anywhere in the United Kingdom in 1886. The town also reported the coldest temperature in the UK in 1883, at −15.1 °C (4.8 °F) on 15 March of that year. Furthermore, Alston also holds the record for highest temperature reported in the UK on 8 November, at 19.1 °C (66.4 °F) in 1881.

There is no official Met Office weather station in Alston; the nearest and most appropriate station is approximately 27 kilometers (16.8 miles) away, near Warcop. In reality, the climate of Alston is likely to be slightly cooler and slightly wetter than the values in the table below imply, being approximately 70 m (230 ft) higher in elevation above mean sea level.

Climate data for Alston, Cumbria - modelled data
Month	Jan	Feb	Mar	Apr	May	Jun	Jul	Aug	Sep	Oct	Nov	Dec	Year
Mean daily maximum °C (°F)	3.9 (39.0)	4.4 (39.9)	6.9 (44.4)	10.1 (50.2)	13.5 (56.3)	16.8 (62.2)	18.1 (64.6)	17.5 (63.5)	14.8 (58.6)	11.5 (52.7)	7.3 (45.1)	4.8 (40.6)	10.8 (51.4)
Daily mean °C (°F)	1.2 (34.2)	1.5 (34.7)	3.5 (38.3)	6.1 (43.0)	9.1 (48.4)	12.4 (54.3)	13.8 (56.8)	13.3 (55.9)	11.0 (51.8)	8.1 (46.6)	4.3 (39.7)	2.1 (35.8)	7.2 (45.0)
Mean daily minimum °C (°F)	−1.5 (29.3)	−1.3 (29.7)	0.2 (32.4)	2.1 (35.8)	4.8 (40.6)	8.0 (46.4)	9.6 (49.3)	9.1 (48.4)	7.3 (45.1)	4.7 (40.5)	1.3 (34.3)	−0.5 (31.1)	3.7 (38.6)
Average precipitation mm (inches)	103 (4.1)	70 (2.8)	83 (3.3)	63 (2.5)	66 (2.6)	67 (2.6)	72 (2.8)	91 (3.6)	90 (3.5)	94 (3.7)	104 (4.1)	104 (4.1)	1,007 (39.7)
Source: Climate-data.org

Climate data for Warcop, Cumbria (1991-2020)
Month	Jan	Feb	Mar	Apr	May	Jun	Jul	Aug	Sep	Oct	Nov	Dec	Year
Mean daily maximum °C (°F)	5.81 (42.46)	6.25 (43.25)	8.33 (46.99)	11.17 (52.11)	14.35 (57.83)	16.81 (62.26)	18.68 (65.62)	18.03 (64.45)	15.78 (60.40)	12.22 (54.00)	8.67 (47.61)	6.33 (43.39)	11.87 (53.36)
Daily mean °C (°F)	3.41 (38.14)	3.55 (38.39)	5.06 (41.11)	7.37 (45.27)	10.20 (50.36)	12.84 (55.11)	14.78 (58.60)	14.39 (57.90)	12.27 (54.09)	9.18 (48.52)	6.00 (42.80)	3.68 (38.62)	8.56 (47.41)
Mean daily minimum °C (°F)	1.00 (33.80)	0.85 (33.53)	1.79 (35.22)	3.56 (38.41)	6.04 (42.87)	8.86 (47.95)	10.87 (51.57)	10.75 (51.35)	8.76 (47.77)	6.13 (43.03)	3.32 (37.98)	1.02 (33.84)	5.25 (41.44)
Average precipitation mm (inches)	93.72 (3.69)	76.27 (3.00)	62.60 (2.46)	50.64 (1.99)	52.87 (2.08)	63.29 (2.49)	75.89 (2.99)	89.73 (3.53)	73.96 (2.91)	94.24 (3.71)	101.33 (3.99)	104.18 (4.10)	938.72 (36.94)
Source: UK Met Office

== History ==
=== Early settlements ===
The earliest evidence of population in the area comes from pottery fragments, a gold basket-earring and flint tools found in one of two barrows located 2 miles (3.2 km) NNW of Alston at Kirkhaugh. Excavated in 1935, the barrows were dated between 2000 BC and 1700 BC.

Evidence of Roman activity in the area comes from the earth ramparts of Whitley Castle, thought to be the Roman fort (Castra) of Epiacum built and rebuilt by the Sixth and Twentieth Legions between the 2nd and 3rd centuries. The fort lies on the Maiden Way Roman road which runs north from Kirkby Thore (Bravoniacum) to Carvoran (Magnae) on Hadrian's Wall. Whitley Castle would have guarded this central supply route to Hadrian's Wall, and may also have helped protect lead and silver deposits in the upper reaches of the South Tyne valley.

The name of the town is recorded in 1164–71 as Aldeneby and in 1209 as Aldeneston, and seems to mean "the settlement or farmstead belonging to [a Viking man named] Halfdan".

By 1841 the town had 1,650 inhabitants.

=== Sovereignty ===
In the 10th century, Alston Moor was part of the Liberty of Tynedale, which was an estate of the Scottish Kings within England, a situation that resulted in many years of confusion over the sovereignty of the area.

In 1085, the Barons de Veteriponte became the first recorded Lords of the Manor; they held the moor on behalf of the kings of Scotland while the kings of England retained the mineral rights. This was confirmed in a hearing during 1279 that concluded that the miners of the area were distinct from the local population, thus paying their dues to the English crown instead of to Scotland. As a result, the miners lived in their own self-regulated communities under English protection.

In 1296 John de Balliol, the king of Scotland, invaded the North of England; as a result Edward I moved to reclaim the Scottish estates and Tynedale, which included Alston Moor, was taken under direct control of the English crown where it remains.

Despite the town being on the Tyne and being historically part of Tynedale, the area has never been part of either Hexhamshire or Northumberland but part of Cumberland and later Cumbria. This was probably because the mines in the area were at one time administered from Carlisle.

=== Mining ===
Historically the area has been mined for lead, zinc, iron, copper, and coal. The nearby Roman fort of Whitley Castle (Epiacum) may in part have been sited to control and protect the lead mines there.

In the 13th century, the area was known as the silver mines of Carlisle — silver was found in a high proportion (up to 40 troy ounces per long ton or 1.2 g/kg of smelted lead) and was used to create coinage in the Royal Mint established in Carlisle for the purpose. Most mining was very small scale until the mid-18th century, with 119 lead mines in the parish of Alston in 1768.

The biggest mine owner in the area was the London Lead Company; this Religious Society of Friends (Quakers) organisation with enlightened employment policies established an interest in the area during the early 18th century. In 1745, it began construction of a school, a library, a sanitary house, a surgeon's house, a market hall with clock tower, a laundry and a 'ready-money' shop in Nenthead, 5 miles (8 km) away. By the 1840s the mines were producing an average of 7,600 tons of lead a year.

Many of the last mines closed in the 1950s. A small drift coal mine (Ayle Colliery) is still active today.

== Governance ==
Alston is in the parliamentary constituency of Penrith and Solway. Markus Campbell-Savours was elected its Labour Member of Parliament (MP) at the 2024 general election.

Before the United Kingdom left the European Union, its residents voted to elect Members of the European Parliament (MEPs) for the North West England constituency.

For Local Government purposes Alston is in the Westmorland and Furness unitary authority. Until 1 April 2023 it was in the Alston Moor Ward of Eden District Council and the Alston and East Fellside Division of Cumbria County Council.

Alston does not have its own parish council, instead it is part of Alston Moor Parish Council.

== Modern economy ==
The area is no longer actively mined for precious metals although the mining history has been exploited for tourism purposes. There are few jobs in the immediate area, hence the fall in population from 1,650 in 1841 to 1,128 today.

=== Farming ===
The surrounding moorland is mainly used for sheep farming; however many farmers also have other enterprises, such as bed and breakfast accommodation. During winter months farming can be tough, due to the severe weather in the area.

=== Tourism ===
Tourism is now an important source of income for the area. The largest attraction is a narrow-gauge railway and heritage centre at South Tynedale Railway. Alston and the surrounding area is part of the North Pennines Area of Outstanding Natural Beauty (AONB) and European Geopark. Alston is noted for its cobbled streets and 17th-century stone buildings. The area's mining heritage has been referenced for tourism purposes across the North Pennines. Nenthead Mines, at the nearby village of Nenthead, is a Scheduled Monument managed by volunteers. The Nenthead Mines Conservation Society hold regular open days where visitors can learn about the history of lead mining and take an underground tour of Carrs Mine. The Pennine Way, the UK's first National Trail, passes by the edge of Alston and the Sea to Sea Cycle Route (C2C) passes through the town.

=== Shops and facilities ===
Shops include a whole foods shop, a Co-op supermarket, a Spar convenience store, a shop selling hardware, a post office, an outdoor clothing shop, an organic bakery, a charity shop and a number of craft, gift and antique shops.

There are four pubs in Alston, and the town also has a number of cafés, a food take-away, a specialist engraving company, two hotels, an independent youth hostel, numerous B&Bs, two petrol stations, a gym, an estate agent and a hairdressers. A once-popular fish and chip shop closed down in November 2022.

The last remaining bank, Barclays, closed in December 2015.

Steam trains on the narrow-gauge South Tynedale Railway run from April to October.

=== Metal working ===
For much of the 20th century, between 1940 and its closure in 1980, a foundry employed around 200 people. The closure of this foundry increased unemployment in the area from 8.9% to over 25%.

Currently the area's main employer is Bonds Precision Castings Limited, a company that took over Precision Products in 2008. Precision Products was started in 1947 by William George Ball. Bonds Precision Casting Ltd. produces stainless steel and super-alloy castings.

== Population ==
The population census figures show that at its peak during 1831 the population of the parish of Alston Moor was 6,858 people. Today that figure is about 1,200. The population of the town of Alston was 1,075 according to the 2021 Census. The community has its own website which is a result of the Cybermoor Project (cybermoor.org), which has brought the Internet to almost every home on Alston Moor, and broadband to many. This allowed people with little or no education access to online courses and training. The problem of the area's relative remoteness compared to other areas of England was solved by utilising IEEE 802.11 technology to construct the network infrastructure.

== Notable residents ==
- Nicholas Ridley (d.1993), politician and government minister.

== Landmarks and buildings of note ==
=== Town hall ===
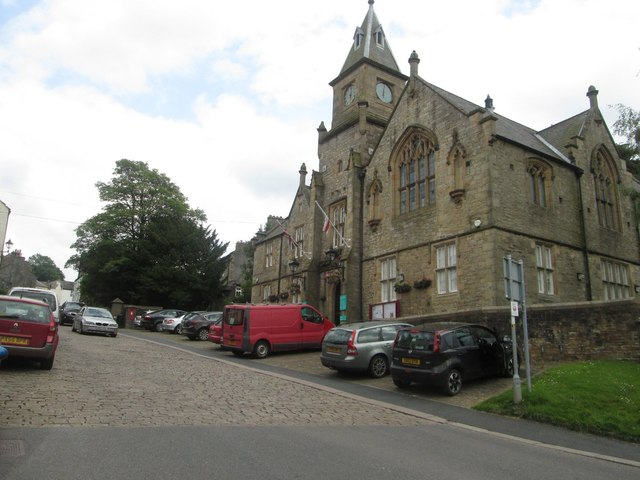
Alston Town Hall

Alston Town Hall is a focal point for the community, being a venue for many local social events. It also contains the tourist information centre and the public library. The Gothic Revival style building, which was commissioned by the local metallurgist and businessman Hugh Lee Pattinson, was completed in 1858.

=== Alston High Mill ===
High Mill in the Cumbrian town of Alston was built in 1767 as a water-driven corn mill by the renowned engineer John Smeaton; Smeaton is famously known for his Eddystone Lighthouse.

The grade II listed High Mill has been through a number of alterations through the ages, but the original Smeaton design is still easily recognisable. Internally there is little left of the original building besides the water wheel and the pit wheel.

In July 2023, the High Mill and the adjoining factory building (once occupied by Bonds Precision Casting) was purchased by a private owner, and work is now underway to refurbish and restore the mill for use as an arts and crafts workshop. The building and mill wheel are Grade II listed, and part of the mill may be given over to a small museum showcasing the wheel and some of the artefacts associated with how it was used.

The Water Wheel at Alston High Mill

360 animation of the history of Alston High Mill

=== Market cross ===
Although the town does not hold a regular market it still maintains the legal right to do so. The market cross, which acts as a focal point in the centre of town, was constructed in 1981 to replace one which was demolished by a wagon in January 1980. That earlier cross had itself replaced a cross of 1883 which was knocked down by a lorry in 1968.

A regular producers' market now takes place in the town hall from April to September selling food and crafts produced in Cumbria, Northumberland and County Durham, celebrating Alston's position at the crux of these three counties.

=== St Augustine of Canterbury Church ===
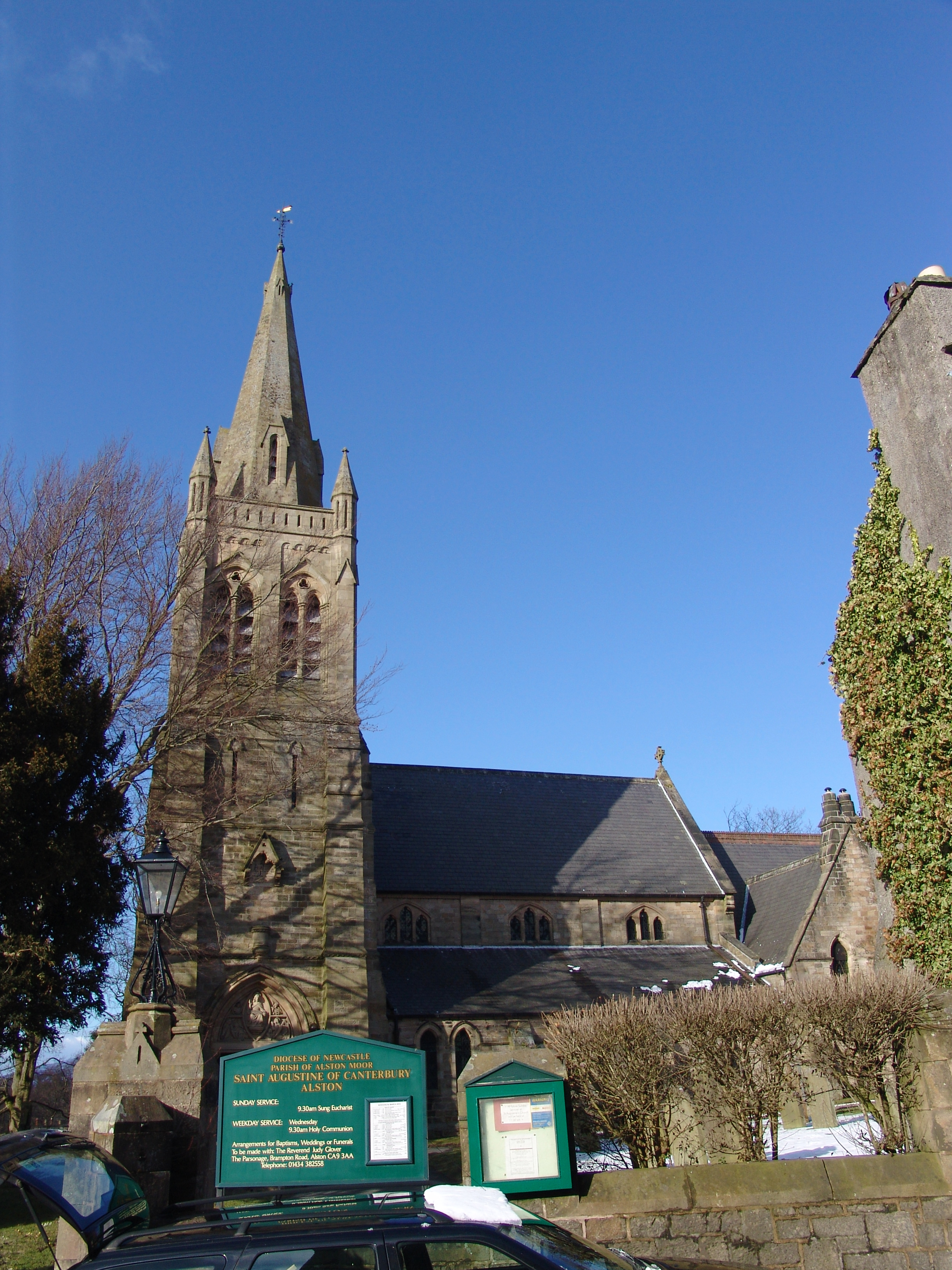
Parish Church of St Augustine of Canterbury, Alston, March 2010

The parish church was built in 1869 on the site of two earlier churches. Despite being in Cumbria the church is in the Diocese of Newcastle rather than the Diocese of Carlisle. The church spire was only completed in 1886. A unique item in the church is a clock which belonged to James Radclyffe, 3rd Earl of Derwentwater, who was beheaded for treason. It is believed to be of 16th-century origin, and was restored in 1978. One of the church bells which was cast in 1714 also belonged to the Earl of Derwentwater. It was installed in the previous church of 1770. Four of the bells were installed in memory of Andrew Graham Stavert Steele, churchwarden from 1943 until his murder in the Midland Bank on 13 September 1949. The bells cannot be pealed as the tower is not strong enough, but they are struck by a clapper.

=== Clarghyll Hall ===
Clarghyll Hall, north of Alston, is a Grade II* listed fortified manor house dating back to the 16th century. It was formerly the home of the Whitfield family and from 1847 to 1889 the home of Rev. Octavius James, who extended the building to add a chapel and study. This new wing burned down in a fire in 1889 in which Rev James died.

=== Nent Force level ===
During the area's peak of prosperity in 1776 John Smeaton began construction of an underground drain (the "Nent Force Level") to de-water the mines of the Nent Valley and assist with the transport of extracted materials as well as to locate new mineral seams. The canal took 66 years to construct at a cost of £80,000, and became known as "Smeaton's Folly". In the 1830s mine manager and engineer said that it could be visited "in boats 30 feet in length, which are propelled in four feet of water by means of sticks projecting from the sides of the level; and thus may be enjoyed the singular novelty of sailing a few miles underground". It was intended to be 9 feet square but in the softer terrain was extended to 9'×16', dead level for 3 3/4 miles (6.0 km) to allow boat use, with a rise of 35 fathoms (210 ft (64 m) at Lovelady Shield and then driven into the Nenthead ground. The amount of ore found was disappointing, though not insignificant.

Efforts have been made to develop a heritage centre to make this piece of engineering more accessible to the public.

=== Samuel King's School ===
As well as having a primary school, the town is host to England's smallest secondary school (an 11–16 comprehensive), Samuel King's School. Samuel King's serves the local communities such as Nenthead and Garrigill. Alston Moor has a second small primary school at Nenthead.

== Media ==
Local TV coverage is provided by BBC North East and Cumbria and ITV Tyne Tees. Television signals are received from the local relay transmitter which is transmitted via the Pontop Pike transmitter, it is situated north east of the town. Local radio stations are BBC Radio Cumbria, Greatest Hits Radio Cumbria & South West Scotland, and community based station Eden FM Radio which broadcast from its studios in Penrith. The town's local newspapers are Cumberland and Westmorland Herald and The Westmorland Gazette.

== Other Media ==
=== Filming locations ===
Front Street and the Market Cross of the town were used as filming locations in a 1997 adaptation of Jane Eyre. The town was also adapted to resemble a seaside village where Oliver is born for the 1999 ITV mini series Oliver Twist.

=== The League of Gentlemen ===
The fictional town of Royston Vasey, the setting of the TV comedy series The League of Gentlemen, is based on Alston.

=== Demographic imbalance ===
In August 2005, Alston made news regarding the town's apparent lack of women, with a claimed ratio of 10 men to every woman in the town. A group of young men from Alston, led by Vince Peart, set up the "Alston Moor Regeneration Society" to persuade women to come to Alston. Articles appeared in the Daily Telegraph, The Guardian and the BBC. A documentary was shown on Channel 4 on 11 October 2006. More than two years later, the Guardian reported that Alston shared first position with Bere Alston in Devon in the top 10 list of places in Britain where the imbalance was at its worst.

== Transport ==
The area is stationed on a number of routes including the long−distance footpath the Pennine Way, and the Sea to Sea (C2C) Cycle Route. Alston railway station was formerly the terminus of a branch line from Haltwhistle. The town's rail link to Haltwhistle was completed in 1852 by the Newcastle and Carlisle Railway Company. The closure of the line was decided in the Beeching Report in 1963, but closure was rejected due to lack of a direct road link. After a road was built, closure was again proposed in 1973 and the line closed on 1 May 1976. It was the last enacted closures of the Beeching Report (another being the Bridport branch line from Bridport to Maiden Newton in Dorset which closed in 1975).

Part of the route, between Alston and Slaggyford, five miles in length, is now operated as the narrow gauge South Tynedale Railway. The railway is particularly popular with tourists and passenger trains operate between April and October, with Santa Special trains operating on certain dates in December each year.

Go North East operates three buses a day between Alston and Haltwhistle (681), where connections can be made to buses and trains to Carlisle and Newcastle. Wright Brothers Coaches operates an 82 miles (132 km) bus route linking Newcastle with Keswick via Hexham, Haydon Bridge, Alston and Penrith from July to September each year. There are term-time bus services to Carlisle primarily for college students.

== See also ==
- Listed buildings in Alston Moor
