= Coanwood railway station =

Disused railway station in Northumberland, England

Coanwood
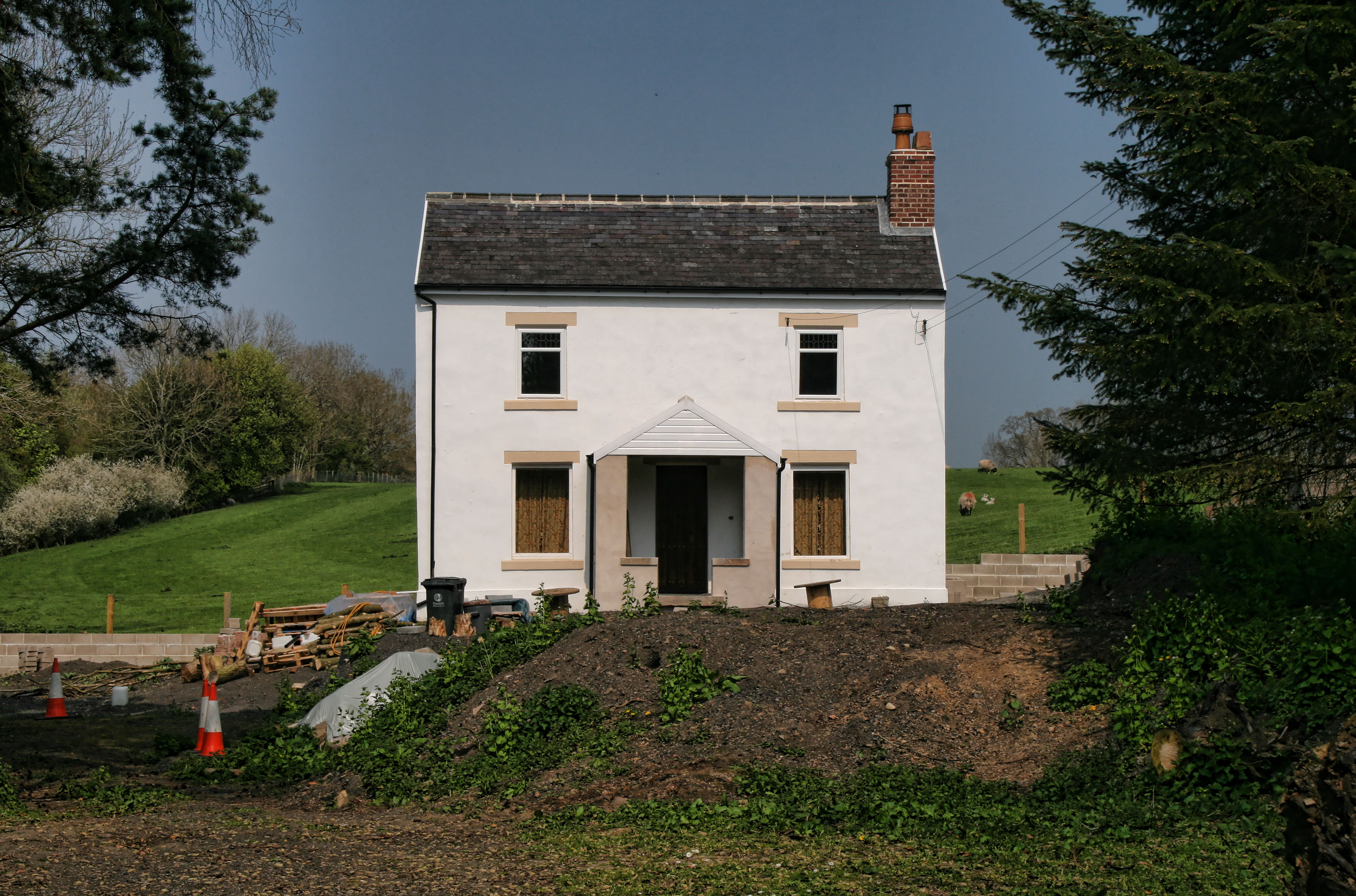

General information
- Location: Coanwood, Northumberland; England
- Coordinates: 54°55′31″N 2°30′15″W
- Grid reference: NY678590
- Platforms: 1
- Tracks: 1

Other information
- Status: Disused

History
- Original company: Newcastle and Carlisle Railway
- Pre-grouping: North Eastern Railway
- Post-grouping: London and North Eastern Railway; British Rail (Eastern Region)

Key dates
- 19 July 1851: Opened as Shaft Hill or Shafthill
- 1 March 1885: Renamed Coanwood
- 3 May 1976: Closed
Location
- Location within Northumberland

Coanwood was a railway station on the Alston Branch Line, which ran between Haltwhistle and Alston. The station, situated 4 miles (6 km) south-west of Haltwhistle, served the village of Coanwood in Northumberland.

Opened by the Newcastle and Carlisle Railway on 19 July 1851, the station was originally known as Shaft Hill or Shafthill. It was later renamed Coanwood on 1 March 1885 by the North Eastern Railway.

== History ==
The Newcastle and Carlisle Railway was formed in 1829, opening to passengers in stages from March 1835. A branch line from Haltwhistle to Alston and Nenthead was first considered in 1841, with the line authorised by an Act of Parliament in August 1846. It was later decided that a line operating as far as Alston was sufficient, with the amended route approved by a further Act in July 1849.

In March 1851, the 4½-mile section from Haltwhistle to Shaft Hill (which was later renamed Coanwood) was opened to goods traffic, with passenger services commencing in July 1851. The 8¼-mile section of the line between Alston and Lambley opened to goods traffic in January 1852, along with a short branch to Lambley Fell, with passenger services commencing in May 1852.

Construction of the branch line was completed in November 1852, following the opening of the, now Grade II* listed, Lambley Viaduct over the River South Tyne.

== Demise and closure ==
Coanwood was reduced to unstaffed halt status in 1955. Nearby Featherstone Park, along with Slaggyford, both became an unstaffed halt in the previous year.

The line was originally marked for closure in the 1960s, under the Beeching plan, however the lack of an all-weather road kept it open. Following improvements to the road network, including a temporary level crossing over the branch at Lambley, the line was closed on 3 May 1976 by the British Railways Board, with the last train working two days earlier. The line was replaced in part by a bus service, which was operated by Ribble Motor Services.

Since the line's closure, a 5-mile (8 km) section of the line has since reopened in stages between Slaggyford and Alston, with heritage services operated by the South Tynedale Railway.

== Sources ==
- Butt, R. V. J. (October 1995). The Directory of Railway Stations: details every public and private passenger station, halt, platform and stopping place, past and present (1st ed.). Sparkford: Patrick Stephens Ltd. ISBN 978-1-85260-508-7. OCLC 60251199. OL 11956311M.
- Jowett, Alan (2000). Jowett's Nationalised Railway Atlas (1st ed.). Penryn, Cornwall: Atlantic Transport Publishers. ISBN 978-0-906899-99-1. OCLC 228266687.
- Jowett, Alan (March 1989). Jowett's Railway Atlas of Great Britain and Ireland: From Pre-Grouping to the Present Day (1st ed.). Sparkford: Patrick Stephens Ltd. ISBN 978-1-85260-086-0. OCLC 22311137.

Preceding station	National Rail	Following station
	Disused railways	
Featherstone Park	North Eastern Railway; Alston Branch Line	Lambley
