= Slaggyford railway station =

Station in Northumberland on the South Tynedale Railway

Slaggyford
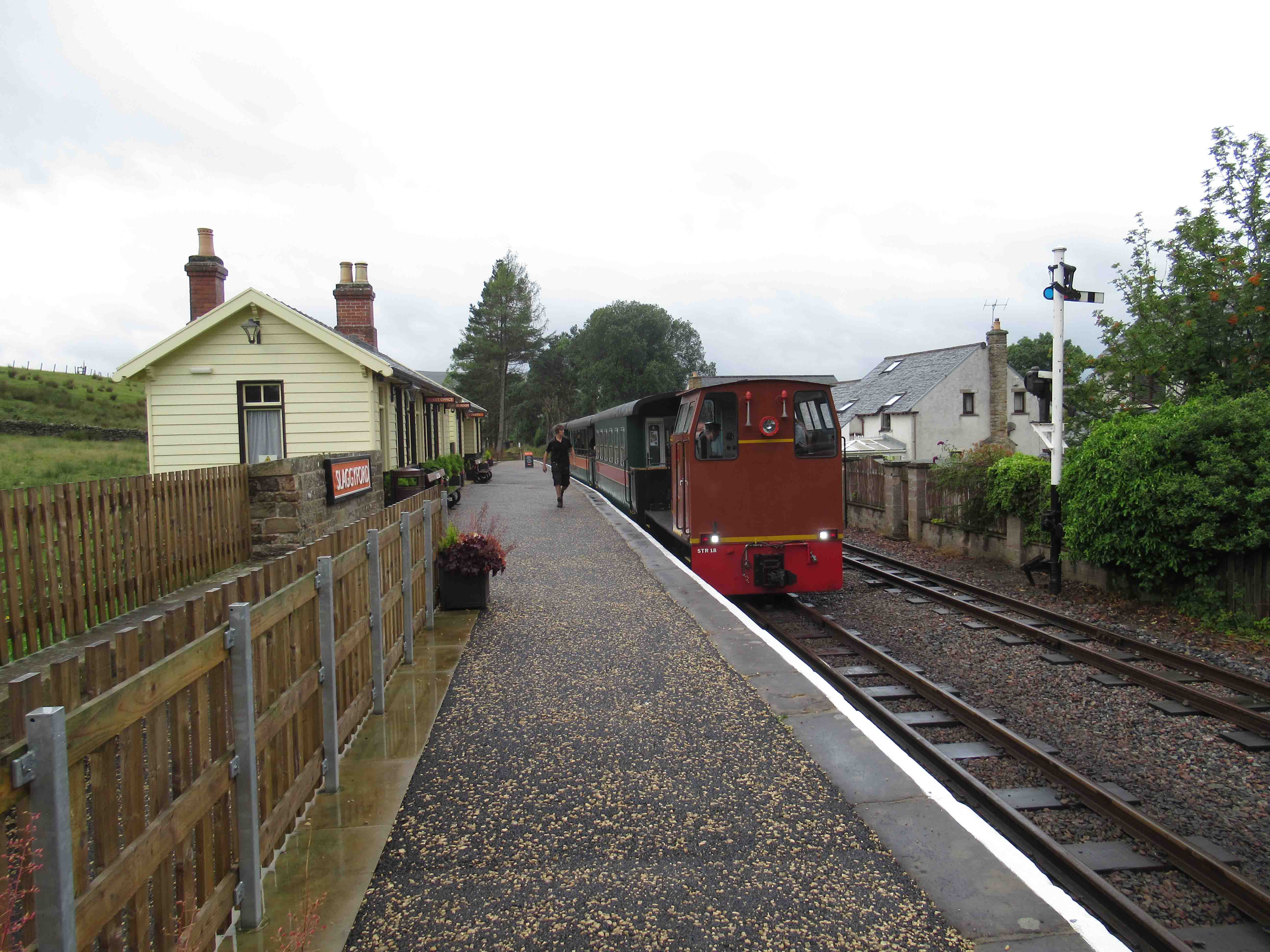

General information
- Location: Slaggyford, Northumberland; England
- Coordinates: 54.8651°N 2.5062°W
- Grid reference: NY676523
- System: Station on heritage railway
- Owner: South Tynedale Railway
- Manager: South Tynedale Railway
- Platforms: 1

History
- Original company: Newcastle and Carlisle Railway
- Pre-grouping: North Eastern Railway
- Post-grouping: London and North Eastern Railway

Key dates
- 21 May 1852: Opened
- 3 May 1976: Closed
- 11 June 2018: Reopened as part of the South Tynedale Railway
Location

Slaggyford was historically a railway station on the Alston Line, which ran between Haltwhistle and Alston. The station served the village of Slaggyford in Northumberland.

Located 8 1/2 miles (13.7 km) from the junction with the Newcastle and Carlisle Railway at Haltwhistle, the station was opened on 21 May 1852 by the North Eastern Railway.

Several unscheduled calling points existed on the section between Slaggyford and Lambley, including Whitwham, Softley, and Burnstones. Trains regularly stopped to allow passengers to board and alight, despite the lack of platforms or facilities at these locations.

After being closed for 42 years, the station reopened in June 2018, as part of the South Tynedale Railway.

== History ==
The Newcastle and Carlisle Railway was formed in 1829, opening to passengers in stages from March 1835. Plans for a branch line from Haltwhistle to Alston and Nenthead were first proposed in 1841, and the line was officially authorised by an Act of Parliament in August 1846. It was later decided that extending the line only to Alston would be sufficient, and the revised route was approved by a second Act of Parliament in July 1849.

In March 1851, the 4½-mile section from Haltwhistle to Shaft Hill (later renamed Coanwood) opened to goods traffic. Passenger services on this section began in July 1851. In January 1852, the 8¼-mile section between Alston and Lambley, along with a short branch to Lambley Fell, opened for goods traffic. Passenger services on this section began in May 1852.

The construction of the branch line was completed in November 1852, following the opening of the, now Grade II* listed, Lambley Viaduct over the River South Tyne.

== Demise and closure ==
In 1954, Slaggyford and Featherstone Park were reduced to unstaffed halt status, with Coanwood following in 1955.

The line was originally slated for closure in the 1960s under the Beeching plan. However, the lack of an all-weather road in the area allowed it to remain operational. Following improvements to the road network, including a temporary level crossing over the branch at Lambley, the line was closed on 3 May 1976 by the British Railways Board, with the last train working two days earlier. The line was replaced in part by a bus service, which was operated by Ribble Motor Services.

== South Tynedale Railway ==
In June 2018, the station reopened as part of the South Tynedale Railway. The narrow-gauge heritage railway operates along a 5-mile (8 km) section of the former Alston Line, which closed to passengers in May 1976. The railway serves former stations at Slaggyford and Alston, as well as purpose-built stations at Lintley Halt and Kirkhaugh.

== See also ==
- Slaggyford
- South Tynedale Railway

Preceding station	Heritage railways	Following station
Terminus	South Tynedale Railway	Lintley Halt towards Alston
Disused railways
Lambley	North Eastern Railway; Alston Line	Alston
