= Kirkhaugh railway station =

Station in Northumberland on the South Tynedale Railway

Kirkhaugh
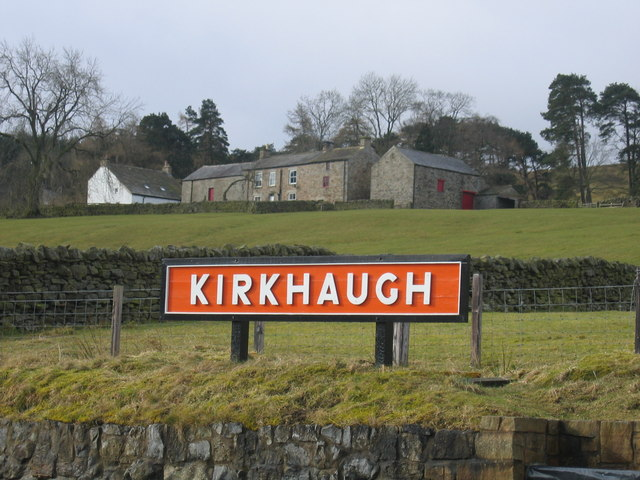

General information
- Location: Kirkhaugh, Northumberland; England
- Coordinates: 54.84033°N 2.47479°W
- Grid reference: NY696496
- System: Station on heritage railway
- Owner: South Tynedale Railway
- Manager: South Tynedale Railway
- Platforms: 1

History
- Original company: South Tynedale Railway

Key dates
- 4 September 1999: Opened
Location

Kirkhaugh is a railway station on the South Tynedale Railway, which runs between Slaggyford and Alston. The station serves the hamlet of Kirkhaugh in Northumberland.

== History ==
The station opened in September 1999, as part of the South Tynedale Railway, a narrow-gauge heritage railway in Cumbria and Northumberland.

The station is located on the alignment of the former Alston Line, which ran from Haltwhistle to Alston, until the line's closure by the British Railways Board in May 1976. However, unlike stations at Alston and Slaggyford, Kirkhaugh was not part of the original line, instead being purpose-built for the heritage railway.

The opening of the extension from Gilderdale to Kirkhaugh saw the closure of the station at Gilderdale, after 13 years of service.

The line was later extended from Kirkhaugh to Lintley Halt in April 2012, and from Lintley Halt to Slaggyford in June 2018, reopening the station following a 42-year closure.

It is the eventual aim of the South Tynedale Railway for the narrow-gauge railway to serve the length of the former Alston Line, restoring the rail link between Haltwhistle and Alston.

== See also ==
- Kirkhaugh
- South Tynedale Railway

Preceding station	Heritage railways	Following station
Lintley Halt towards Slaggyford	South Tynedale Railway	Alston Terminus
