= Lintley Halt railway station =

Station in Northumberland on the South Tynedale Railway

Lintley Halt
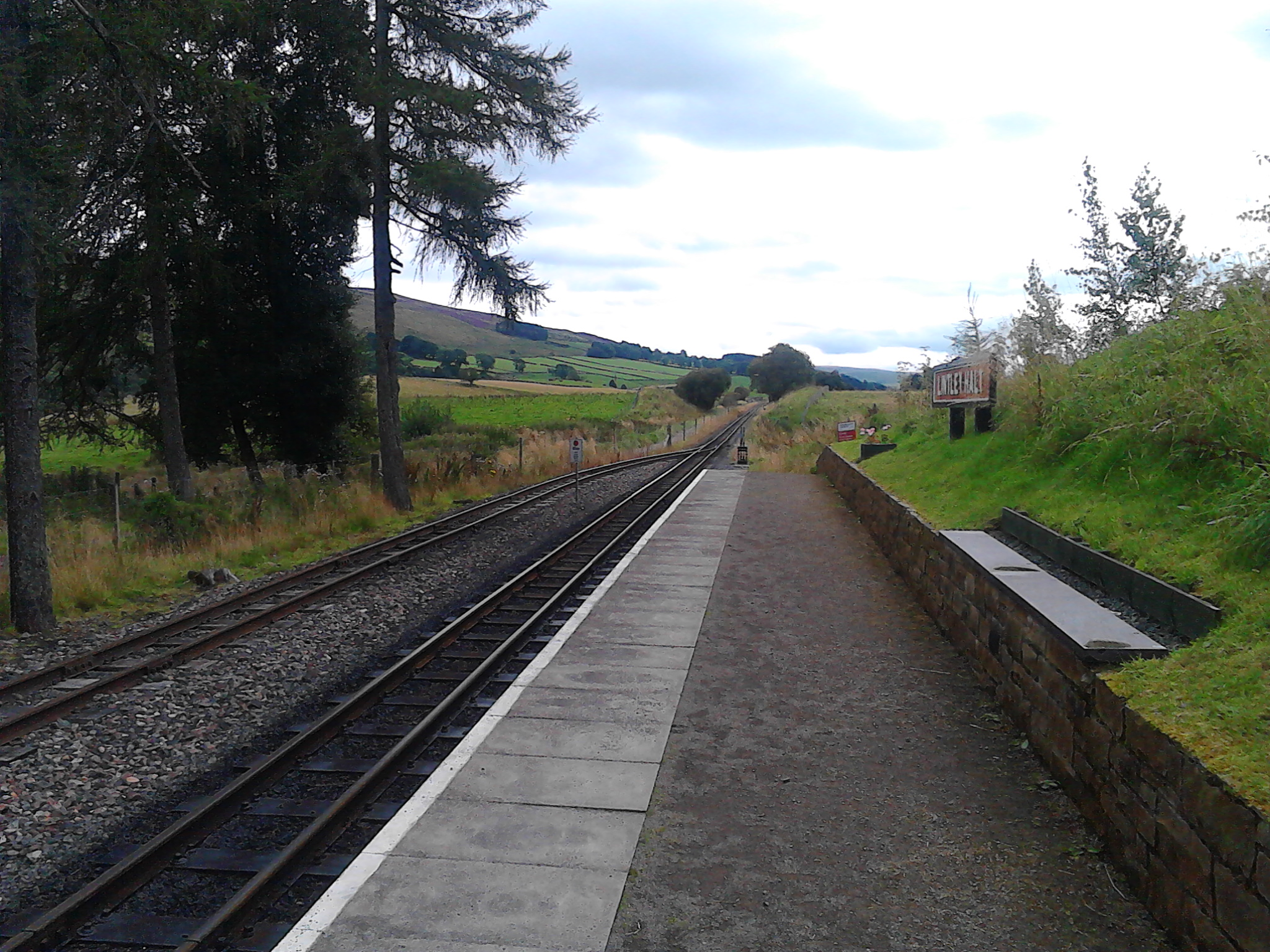

General information
- Location: Slaggyford, Northumberland; England
- Coordinates: 54.85229°N 2.48608°W
- Grid reference: NY68895093
- System: Station on heritage railway
- Owner: South Tynedale Railway
- Manager: South Tynedale Railway
- Platforms: 1

History
- Original company: South Tynedale Railway

Key dates
- 1 April 2012: Opened
Location

Lintley Halt is a railway station on the South Tynedale Railway, which runs between Slaggyford and Alston. The station is located about 1 1/4 miles (2 km) from the village of Slaggyford in Northumberland.

== History ==
The station opened in April 2012, as part of the South Tynedale Railway, a narrow-gauge heritage railway in Cumbria and Northumberland. It was officially opened by Lord Inglewood in May 2012.

The station is located on the alignment of the former Alston Line, which ran from Haltwhistle to Alston, until the line's closure by the British Railways Board in May 1976. However, unlike stations at Alston and Slaggyford, Lintley Halt was not part of the original line, instead being purpose-built for the heritage railway.

The South Tynedale Railway was extended from Lintley Halt to Slaggyford in June 2018, reopening the station following a 42-year closure.

It is the eventual aim of the South Tynedale Railway for the narrow-gauge railway to serve the length of the former Alston Line, restoring the rail link between Haltwhistle and Alston.

== See also ==
- Slaggyford
- South Tynedale Railway

Preceding station	Heritage railways	Following station
Slaggyford Terminus	South Tynedale Railway	Kirkhaugh towards Alston
