= Lambley Footbridge =

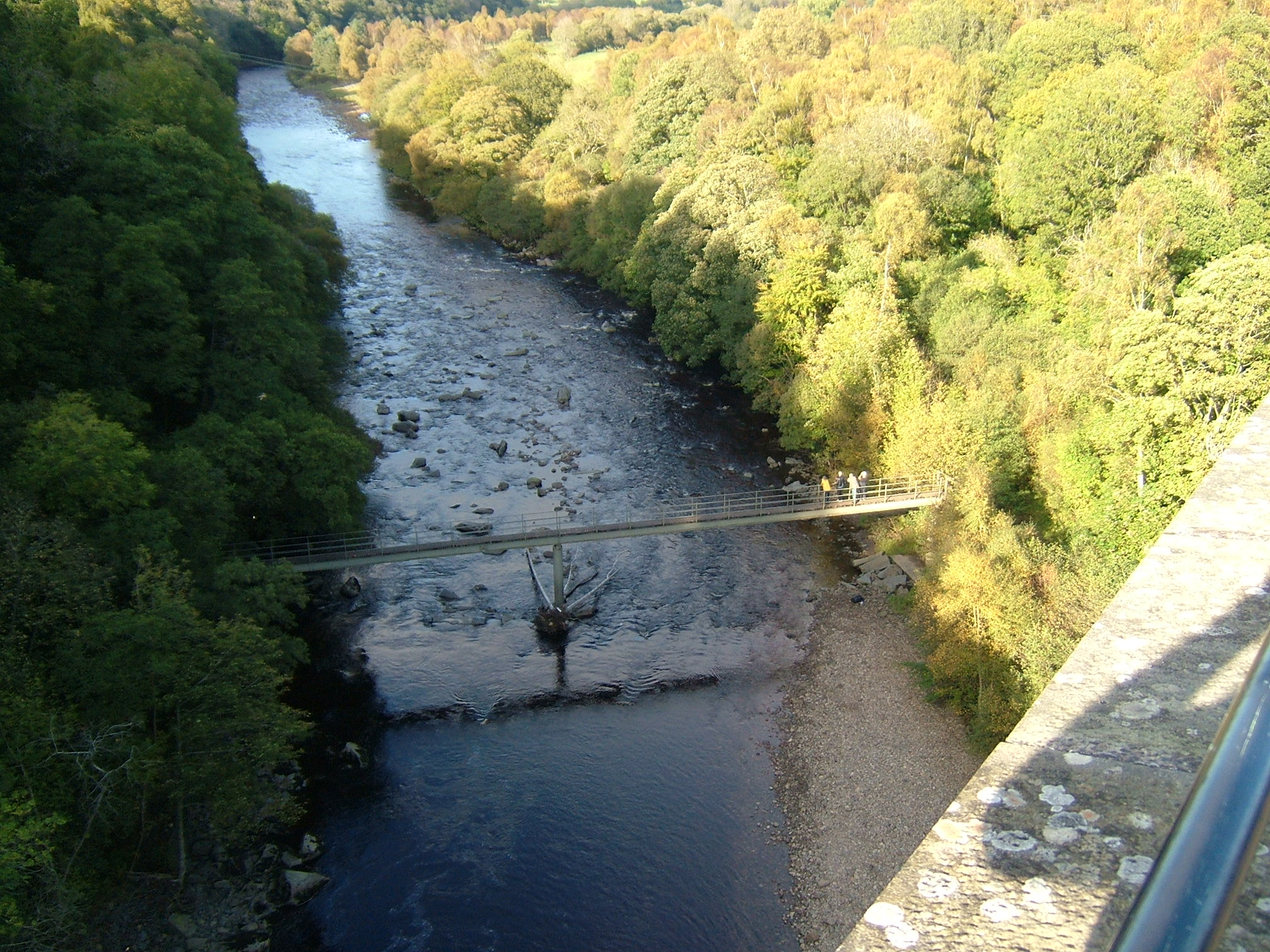
- Lambley Footbridge
- Coordinates: 54.9197°N 2.5094°W
- OS grid reference: NY674584
- Carries: Pedestrians
- Crosses: River South Tyne
- Locale: Northumberland

Characteristics
- Design: Beam bridge
- Material: Wood
- No. of spans: 2
- Piers in water: 1

History
- Construction end: 1992
- Opened: 1992
- Replaces: Footbridge attached to Lambley Viaduct

Lambley Footbridge is a wooden bridge across the River South Tyne at Lambley in Northumberland.

== History ==
The present wooden structure replaces an old derelict footbridge which was attached to the viaduct above, but was no longer maintained after British Rail closed the Alston line. The new footbridge was completed in 1992.

Next bridge upstream	River South Tyne	Next bridge downstream
Lambley Viaduct; Pedestrians and 68	Lambley Footbridge; Grid reference NY674584	Diamond Oak Bridge; Road and 68
