= Alston railway station =

Station in Cumbria on the South Tynedale Railway

Alston
- Alston railway station in 2026

General information
- Location: Alston, Westmorland and Furness; England
- Coordinates: 54°48′54″N 2°26′31″W
- Grid reference: NY716467
- System: Station on heritage railway
- Owner: South Tynedale Railway
- Manager: South Tynedale Railway
- Platforms: 1 (1852–2017); 2 (2017–)

History
- Original company: Newcastle and Carlisle Railway
- Pre-grouping: North Eastern Railway
- Post-grouping: London and North Eastern Railway; British Rail (Eastern Region)

Key dates
- 21 May 1852: Opened
- 3 May 1976: Closed
- 30 July 1983: Reopened as part of the South Tynedale Railway
Location
- Location within the former Eden District Location within Cumbria

Alston is a heritage railway station on the South Tynedale Railway. The station, situated 13 miles (21 km) south of Haltwhistle, is in the market town of Alston, in Cumbria, England.

It was originally on the Alston Branch Line, which ran between Haltwhistle and Alston. It was opened by the North Eastern Railway on 21 May 1852, closing on 3 May 1976. Following a seven-year closure, the station reopened in July 1983, as part of the South Tynedale Railway.

== History ==
The Newcastle and Carlisle Railway was formed in 1829, opening to passengers in stages from March 1835. A branch line from Haltwhistle to Alston and Nenthead was first considered in 1841, with the line authorised by an Act of Parliament in August 1846. It was later decided that a line operating as far as Alston was sufficient, with the amended route approved by a further Act in July 1849.

In March 1851, the 4 1/2-mile (7 km) section from Haltwhistle to Shaft Hill (which was later renamed Coanwood) was opened to goods traffic, with passenger services commencing in July 1851. The 8 1/4-mile (13 km) section of the line between Alston and Lambley opened to goods traffic in January 1852, along with a short branch to Lambley Fell, with passenger services commencing in May 1852.

Construction of the branch line was completed in November 1852, following the opening of the, now Grade II* listed, Lambley Viaduct over the River South Tyne.

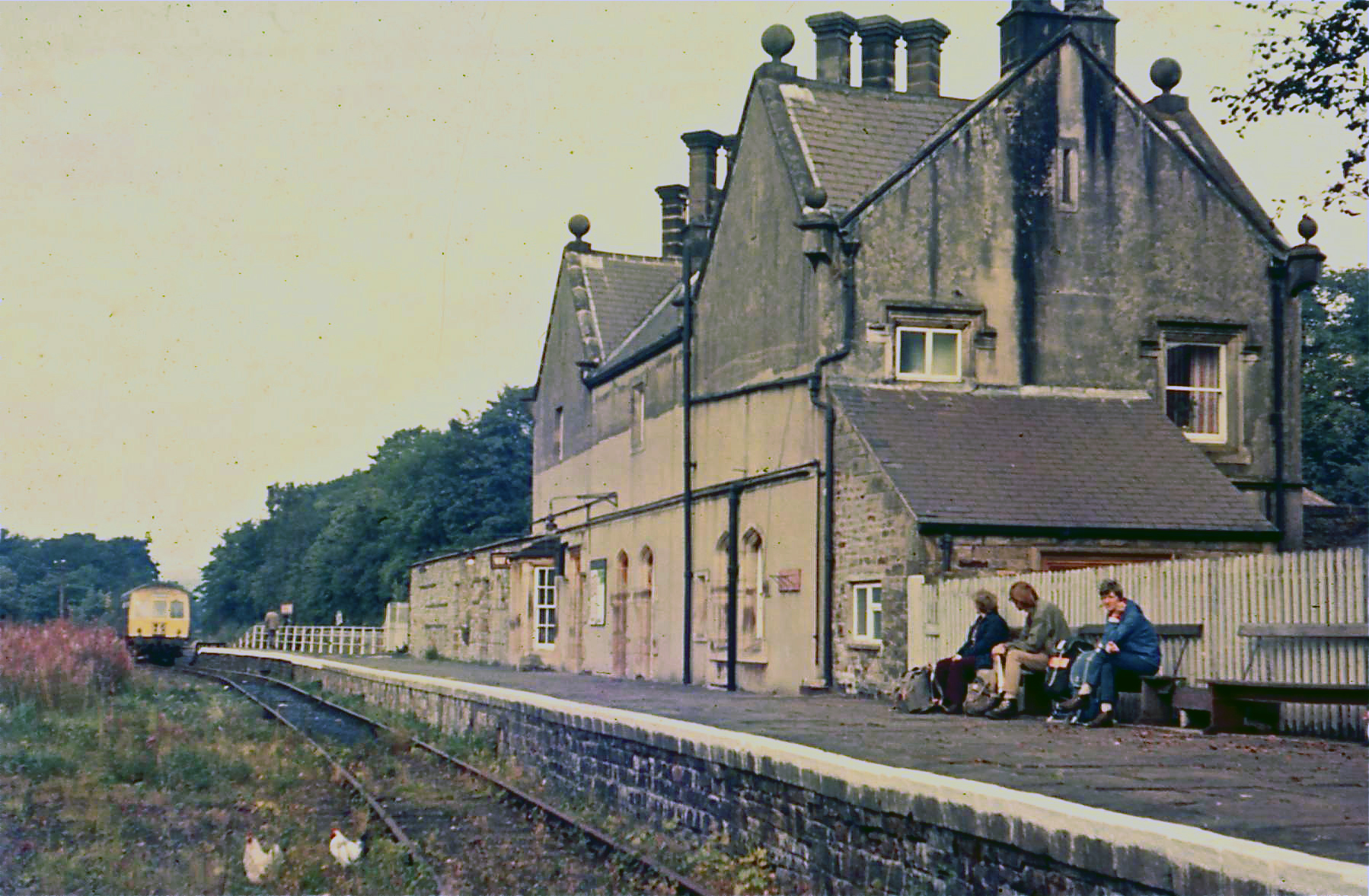
The station in 1973

The station was well provided having a single platform with a train shed roof covering both the platform, and two tracks. The train shed roof was originally arc-shaped but was replaced in 1872–3 with a double-pitched roof. The train shed was connected to a set of station buildings with ornate chimneys and mullioned windows. Beyond the platform the line terminated in a turntable, although this was removed before the end of steam.

Other buildings included an engine shed, goods shed, snowplough shed and signal box, amongst others. An unusual feature of the station was the height of the original platform, which was constructed to be only 12 inches (30 cm) high. This was, however, later increased to 30 inches (76 cm).

The station was host to a camping coach in 1933 and from 1936 to 1939 – one of 119 vehicles converted by the London and North Eastern Railway between 1933 and 1938.

== Demise and closure ==
Alston became an unstaffed halt in 1969, with Lambley succeeding three years earlier. Featherstone Park and Slaggyford were reduced to unstaffed halt status in 1954, along with Coanwood in 1955.

The line was originally marked for closure in the 1960s, however the lack of an all-weather road kept it open. Following improvements to the road network, including a temporary level crossing over the branch at Lambley, the line was closed on 3 May 1976 by the British Railways Board, with the last train working two days earlier. The line was replaced in part by a bus service, which was operated by Ribble Motor Services.

== South Tynedale Railway ==
In July 1983, the station reopened as part of the South Tynedale Railway, also serving as the organisation's headquarters. The narrow-gauge heritage railway operates along a 5-mile (8 km) section of the former Alston Line, which closed to passengers in May 1976. The railway serves former stations at Slaggyford and Alston, as well as purpose-built stations at Lintley Halt and Kirkhaugh.

== See also ==
- Alston
- South Tynedale Railway

== Sources ==
- Butt, R. V. J. (October 1995). The Directory of Railway Stations: details every public and private passenger station, halt, platform and stopping place, past and present (1st ed.). Sparkford: Patrick Stephens Ltd. ISBN 978-1-85260-508-7. OCLC 60251199. OL 11956311M.
- Jowett, Alan (2000). Jowett's Nationalised Railway Atlas (1st ed.). Penryn, Cornwall: Atlantic Transport Publishers. ISBN 978-0-906899-99-1. OCLC 228266687.
- Jowett, Alan (March 1989). Jowett's Railway Atlas of Great Britain and Ireland: From Pre-Grouping to the Present Day (1st ed.). Sparkford: Patrick Stephens Ltd. ISBN 978-1-85260-086-0. OCLC 22311137.
- McRae, Andrew (1997). British Railway Camping Coach Holidays: The 1930s & British Railways (London Midland Region). Vol. Scenes from the Past: 30 (Part One). Foxline. ISBN 1-870119-48-7.

Preceding station	Heritage railways	Following station
Kirkhaugh towards Slaggyford	South Tynedale Railway	Terminus
Disused railways
Slaggyford	North Eastern Railway; Alston Branch Line	Terminus
