= Kirkheugh =

Kirkhaugh or Kirkheugh may refer to:

- Kirkhaugh, a village in Northumberland, England
- Church of St Mary on the Rock, St Andrews, Scotland, also known as St Mary of the Culdees, Kirkheugh and Church of St Mary of Kilrymont
