= Bardon Mill railway station =

Railway station in Northumberland, England

Bardon Mill
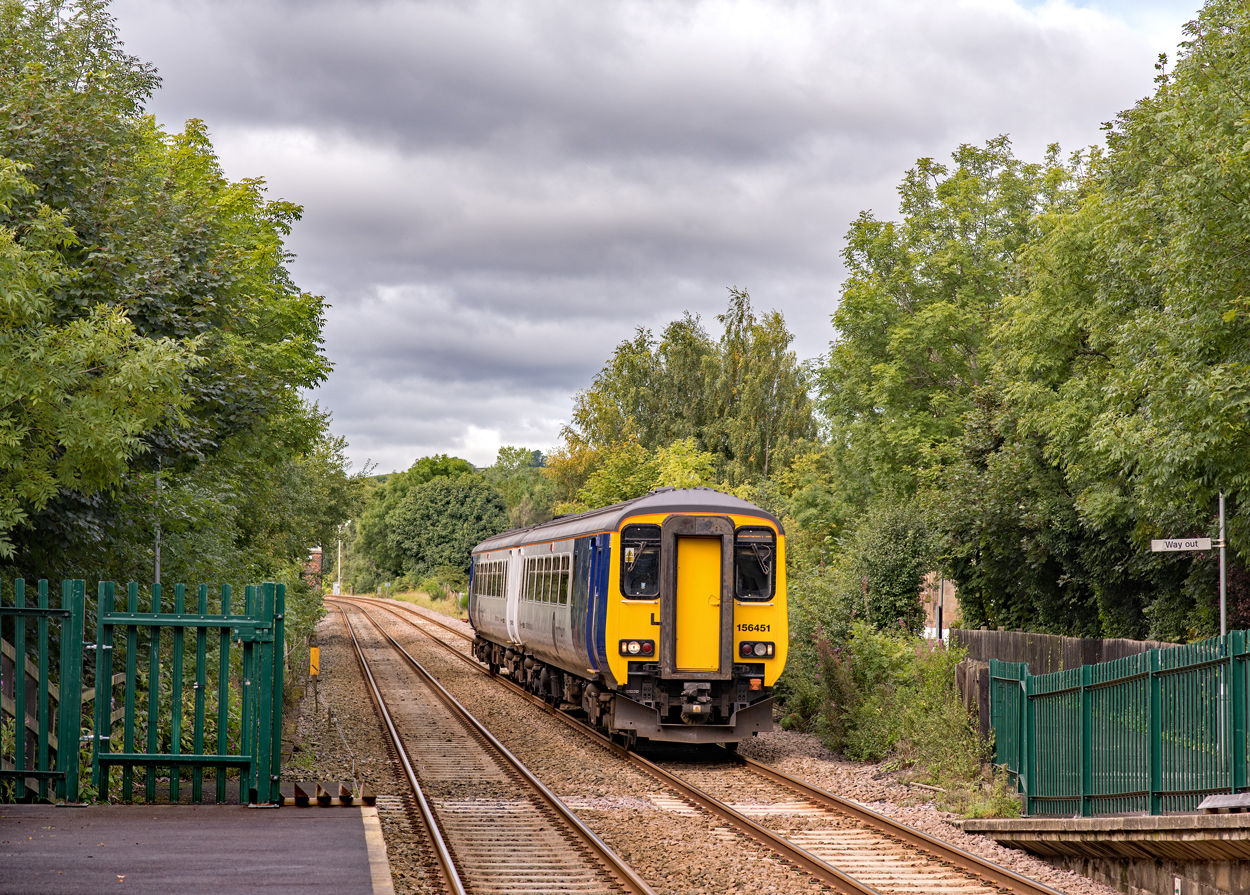

General information
- Location: Bardon Mill, Northumberland; England
- Coordinates: 54°58′28″N 2°20′42″W
- Grid reference: NY778645
- Owner: Network Rail
- Manager: Northern Trains
- Platforms: 2
- Tracks: 2

Other information
- Station code: BLL
- Classification: DfT category F2

History
- Original company: Newcastle and Carlisle Railway
- Pre-grouping: North Eastern Railway
- Post-grouping: London and North Eastern Railway; British Rail (North Eastern Region)

Key dates
- 18 June 1838: Opened

Passengers
- 2021/22: ▲7,490
- 2022/23: ▲8,270
- 2023/24: ▲10,736
- 2024/25: ▼10,046
- 2025/26: ▲12,962
Location
- Location within Northumberland
Notes
- Passenger statistics from the Office of Rail and Road

Bardon Mill is a railway station on the Tyne Valley Line, which runs between Newcastle and Carlisle via Hexham. The station, situated 27 miles 54 chains (27.7 mi; 44.5 km) east of Carlisle, serves the village of Bardon Mill in Northumberland, England. It is owned by Network Rail and managed by Northern Trains.

== History ==
The Newcastle and Carlisle Railway was formed in 1829, and was opened in stages. The station was opened in June 1838, following the opening of the line between Greenhead and Haydon Bridge.

In 1967, the station became an unstaffed halt, along with most of the other stations on the line that escaped the Beeching Axe. The former station house and waiting room remain as a private residence.

There is an operational (though usually unstaffed) signal box at Bardon Mill, which was constructed in the 1870s by the North Eastern Railway. It is Grade II listed, recognised as one of the earliest surviving NER Type N1 signal boxes.

In April 2019, the platforms at the station were extended ahead of the introduction of upgraded rolling stock, as part of the Great North Rail project.

== Facilities ==
The station has two platforms, both of which have a ticket machine (which accepts card or contactless payment only), seating, waiting shelter, next train audio and visual displays and an emergency help point. There is step-free access to both platforms, which are linked by barrow crossing. There is a small car park and cycle storage at the station.

Bardon Mill is part of the Northern Trains penalty fare network, meaning that a valid ticket or promise to pay notice is required prior to boarding the train.

== Services ==
Since the December 2025 timetable change, there is an hourly service between Newcastle and Carlisle via Hexham. Some services extend to Middlesbrough via Hartlepool. All services are operated by Northern Trains.

Rolling stock used: Class 156 Super Sprinter and Class 158 Express Sprinter

Preceding station	National Rail	Following station
Haydon Bridge towards Newcastle	Northern Trains; Tyne Valley Line	Haltwhistle towards Carlisle
	Historical railways	
Haydon Bridge	North Eastern Railway; Newcastle and Carlisle Railway	Haltwhistle
