= Haydon Bridge railway station =

Railway station in Northumberland, England

Haydon Bridge
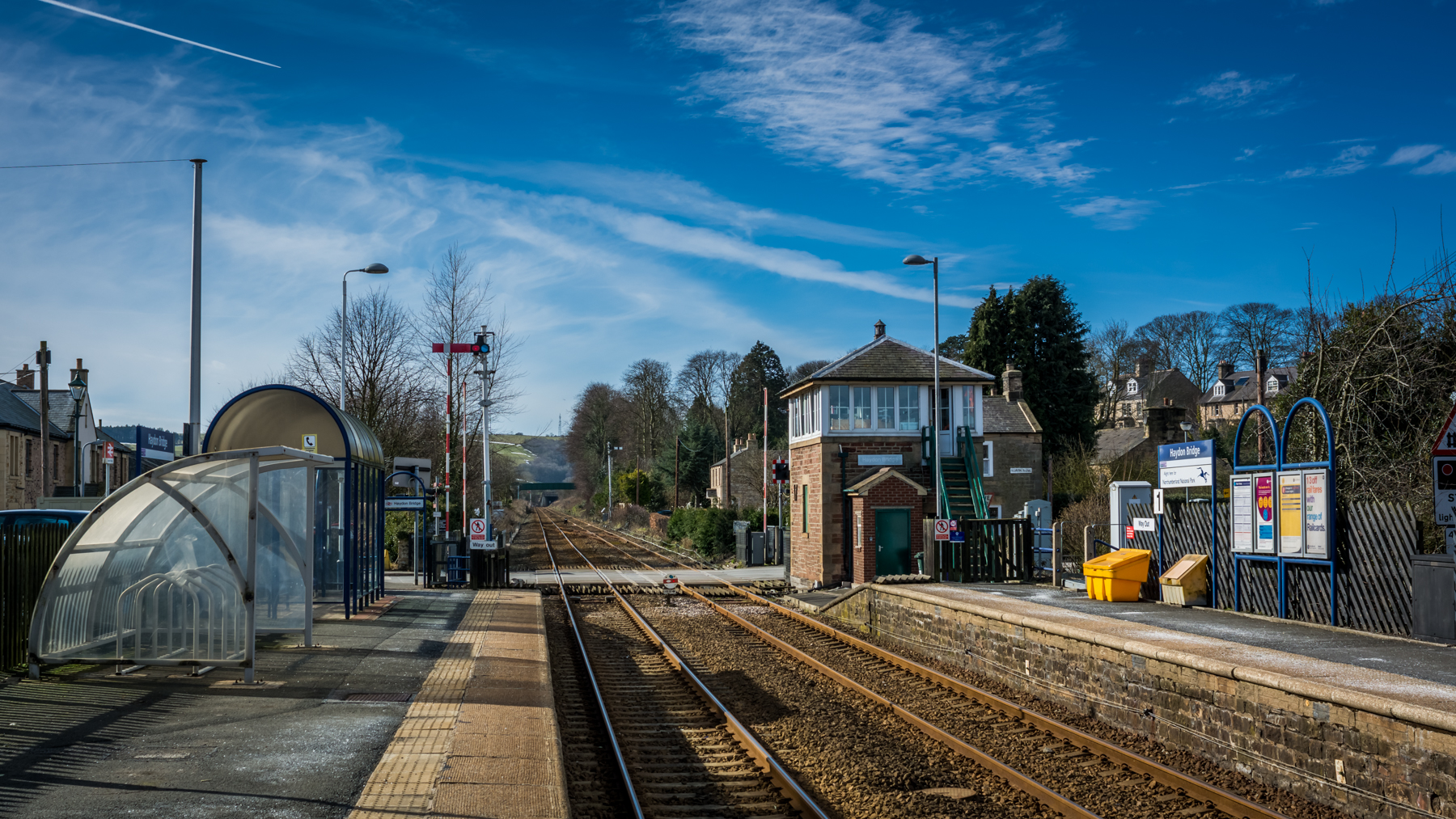

General information
- Location: Haydon Bridge, Northumberland; England
- Coordinates: 54°58′31″N 2°14′50″W
- Grid reference: NY842645
- Owner: Network Rail
- Manager: Northern Trains
- Platforms: 2
- Tracks: 2

Other information
- Station code: HDB
- Classification: DfT category F2

History
- Original company: Newcastle and Carlisle Railway
- Pre-grouping: North Eastern Railway
- Post-grouping: London and North Eastern Railway; British Rail (North Eastern Region)

Key dates
- 28 June 1836: Opened
- 18 June 1838: Resited

Passengers
- 2021/22: ▲35,834
- 2022/23: ▲38,830
- 2023/24: ▲42,914
- 2024/25: ▲47,444
- 2025/26: ▲54,752
Location
Notes
- Passenger statistics from the Office of Rail and Road

Haydon Bridge is a railway station on the Tyne Valley Line, which runs between Newcastle and Carlisle via Hexham. The station, situated 29 miles 68 chains (29.8 mi; 48.0 km) west of Newcastle, serves the village of Haydon Bridge in Northumberland, England. It is owned by Network Rail and managed by Northern Trains.

== History ==
The Newcastle and Carlisle Railway was formed in 1829, and was opened in stages. The station opened as a terminus in June 1836, following the opening of the line between Hexham and Haydon Bridge. In June 1838, the line was extended to Greenhead.

The nearby station at Fourstones closed in January 1967. In the same year, the station became an unstaffed halt, along with most of the other stations on the line that escaped the Beeching Axe. The original station building remains as a private residence.

The station's distinctive manually operated wooden level crossing gates were replaced by automated lifting barriers in January 2009, although they remain under the control of the adjacent North Eastern Railway signal box.

== Facilities ==
The station has two platforms, both of which have a ticket machine (which accepts card or contactless payment only), seating, waiting shelter, next train audio and visual displays and an emergency help point. There is step-free access to both platforms by level crossing. There is a small car park at the station.

Haydon Bridge is part of the Northern Trains penalty fare network, meaning that a valid ticket or promise to pay notice is required prior to boarding the train.

== Services ==
Since the December 2025 timetable change, there is an hourly service between Newcastle and Carlisle via Hexham. Some services extend to Middlesbrough via Hartlepool. All services are operated by Northern Trains.

Rolling stock used: Class 156 Super Sprinter and Class 158 Express Sprinter

Preceding station	National Rail	Following station
Hexham towards Newcastle	Northern Trains; Tyne Valley Line	Bardon Mill towards Carlisle
	Historical railways	
Fourstones	North Eastern Railway; Newcastle and Carlisle Railway	Bardon Mill
