= Rowfoot =

Hamlet in Northumberland, England

Coordinates: 54.9403°N 2.4932°W

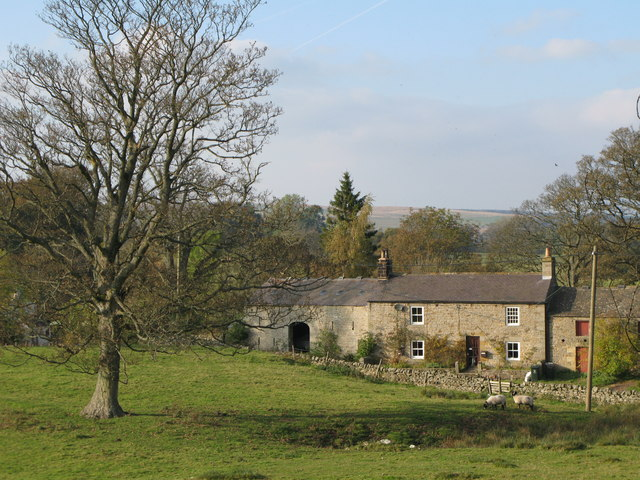
- Cottage in Rowfoot

- Location within Northumberland
- Civil parish: Featherstone
- Unitary authority: Northumberland
- Ceremonial county: Northumberland
- Region: North East
- Country: England
- Sovereign state: United Kingdom
- Police: Northumbria
- Fire: Northumberland
- Ambulance: North East

Rowfoot is a hamlet in the civil parish of Featherstone, in Northumberland, England. It was historically served by Featherstone Park railway station.
