= Coanwood =

Village in Northumberland, England

Coordinates: 54.926°N 2.499°W

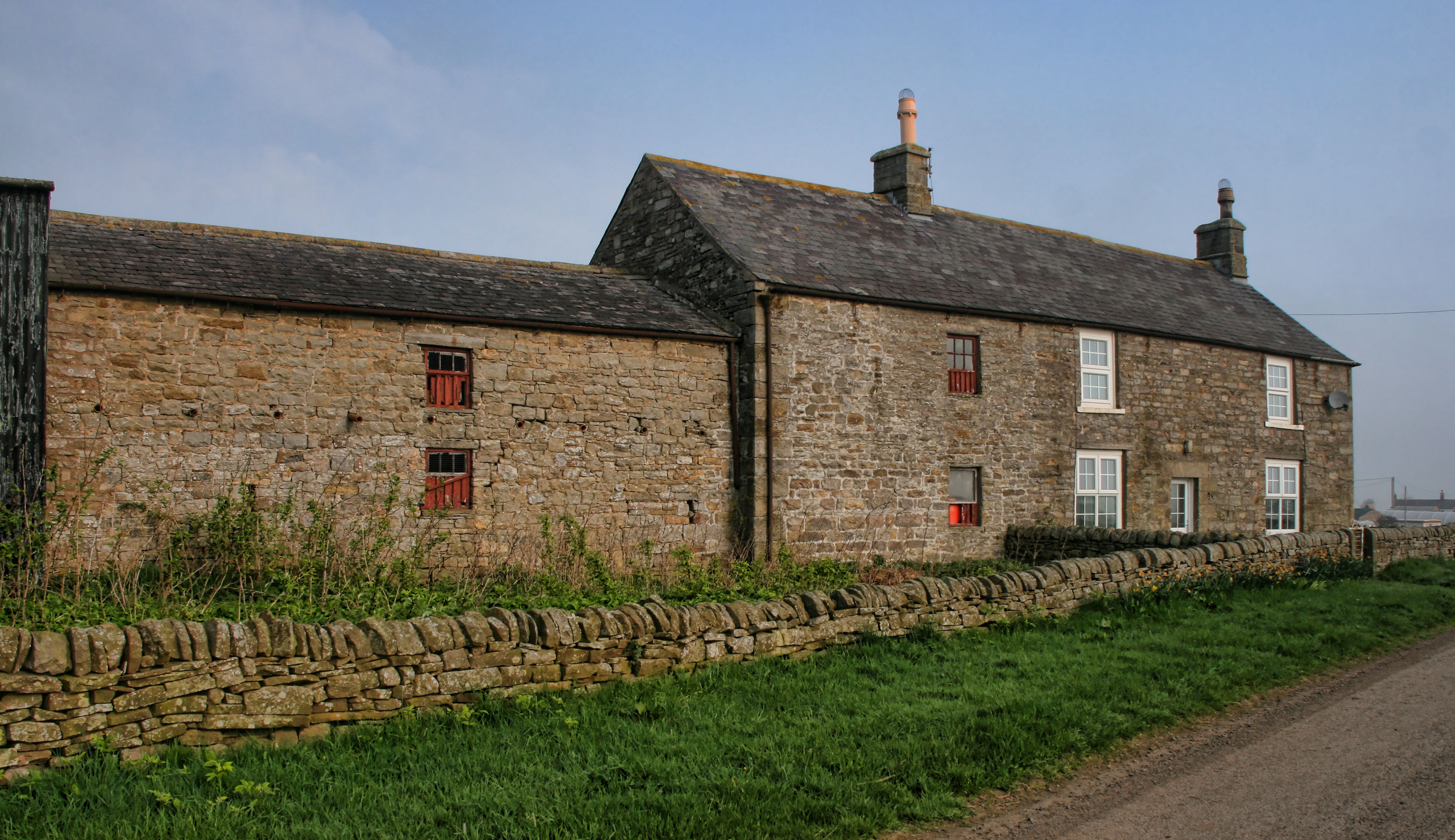
- Moss House Farm

- Location within Northumberland
- Population: 199 (2011)
- OS grid reference: NY680592
- Unitary authority: Northumberland
- Ceremonial county: Northumberland
- Region: North East
- Country: England
- Sovereign state: United Kingdom
- Post town: HALTWHISTLE
- Postcode district: NE49
- Dialling code: 01434
- Police: Northumbria
- Fire: Northumberland
- Ambulance: North East
- UK Parliament: Hexham

Coanwood is a village in Northumberland, England, and is part of the Parish of Haltwhistle. It is about four miles (6 km) to the south-west of Haltwhistle, on the South Tyne. Nearby is the village of Lambley.

Coanwood was anciently written as Collingwood meaning "Hazel Trees/Woods".

== History ==
Sir Simon Musgrave was recorded in 1568 as possessed of East and West Coingwood, which he and his wife Julian conveyed in 1575 to Richard Lowther whose daughter Anne married Alexander Featherstonhaugh (/ˈfænʃɔː/ FAN-shaw). By 1633 Albany Featherstonhaugh was Lord of the Manor, and in 1656 sold the manor to Nicholas Byreley of Whitehall, Durham. Byerley, and Thos Selby of Winlaton, in 1657 conveyed the manor to Thomas Wallis, of Ash Holme, but Byreley remained Court Baron.

A declaration of 1659 in name of Richard Cromwell that Cuthbert Wigham buys the Manor of East and West Coanwood with 14 tenements and 500 acres (200 ha) land and common of pasture from Albany Featherstonhaugh, Nicholas Byreley, and Thos Selby. In 1673 Matthew Wigham of Conewood was "collecting rates" as he was High Constable of the West Division of Tindale Ward. William Wigham, son of Matthew, served his Apprenticeship at Chapell with Matthew Baxter as a Skinner and Glover, and in 1699 Baxter was in court for beating Edward Short and breaking his head, accused and fined 6s 8d for blood and affray. Short was also fined for beating Baxter and throwing a stone at him, 6d.

A riding of the manor boundary took place on 1 May 1700. Thomas Wallis, Lord of Manor of West Coanwood and Matthew Wigham, Lord of the Manor of East Coanwood together with their 20 customary tenants rode the boundary between Chriswell Bourne and Old Lough Foote, Whitfield. Boundary agreed and signed by all.

The turn of the century, in 1900, was a much quieter time in Coanwood with several properties going into disrepair for the first time. This was mainly due to the closure of the colliery at Dykes in the late 1800s and the miners moving to pastures new.

In 1970 Yont the Cleugh farm was purchased by Neville Hanson and converted into a caravan park which he ran with his son Peter until it changed hands in 1995. Since then the site has had 4 owners and is still thriving.

== Governance ==
Coanwood is in the parliamentary constituency of Hexham.

== Geography ==
Coanwood has coal reserves and has in the past been a coal mining area. From the 1860s to 1930 coal was worked in the area. In 1914 the Coanwood Coal Company employed 63 people.

== Transport: railways ==
Coanwood was served by Coanwood Railway Station on the Alston Line from Haltwhistle to Alston. The line opened in 1852 and closed in 1976.

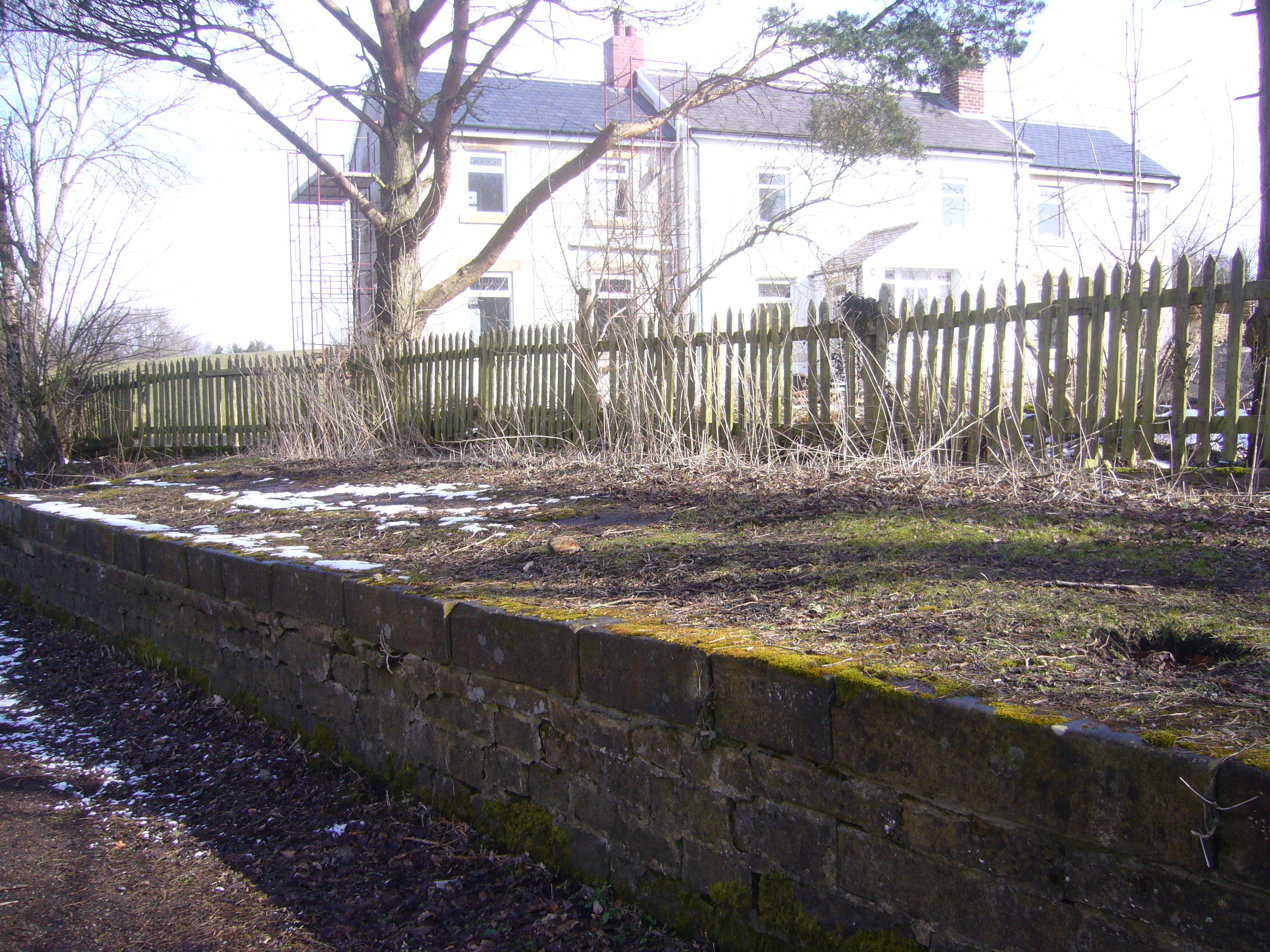
Platform at derelict old station March 2013

== Education ==
The Herdley Bank Church of England Aided First School provides primary school education. By a [Statutory Instrument] no. 3301 in 2005 the school was designated as a school having a religious character. Prior to 1928, when the Local Education Authority took over responsibility for the school, Herdley Bank was a Church of England School, with the Vicar of Lambley as its chairman. In 2016 Herdley Bank First School was closed and is now reopening as a school for people with varying different needs.

== Religious sites ==
Quaker Meetings were first held in 1659 after a licence was obtained by Cuthbert Wigham from the Quarter Sessions. This licence was for his home, Burn House, to be used for Quaker Meetings. Coanwood Friends Meeting House was built in 1760 by Cuthbert Wigham to hold the "silent" Quaker meetings. Coanwood Reading Society at the Quaker Meeting House was closed on 17 October 1909 after 59 years. The meeting house is now in the care of the Historic Chapels Trust.
