= Kirkhaugh =

Village in Northumberland, England

Coordinates: 54.843°N 2.473°W

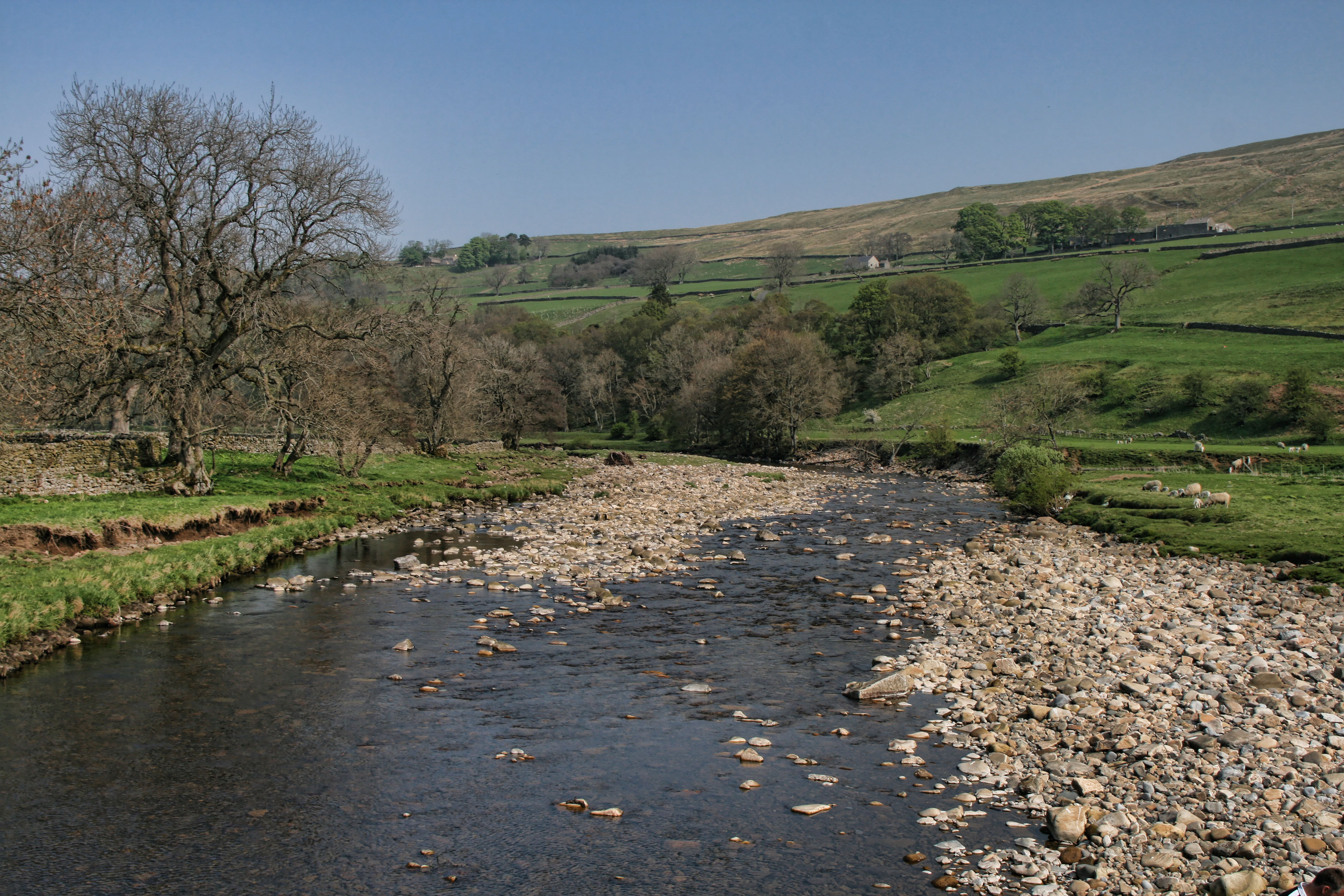
- River South Tyne from Kirkhaugh Bridge

- Location within Northumberland
- OS grid reference: NY696499
- Civil parish: Knaresdale with Kirkhaugh
- Unitary authority: Northumberland
- Ceremonial county: Northumberland
- Region: North East
- Country: England
- Sovereign state: United Kingdom
- Post town: ALSTON
- Postcode district: CA9
- Dialling code: 01434
- Police: Northumbria
- Fire: Northumberland
- Ambulance: North East
- UK Parliament: Hexham

Kirkhaugh is a very small village in the civil parish of Knaresdale with Kirkhaugh, adjacent to the River South Tyne in Northumberland, England. The village lies close to the A689 road north of Alston, Cumbria.

== Governance ==
Kirkhaugh is in the parliamentary constituency of Hexham. In 1951 the parish had a population of 79. On 1 April 1955 the parish was abolished to form Slaggyford which was renamed "Knaresdale with Kirkhaugh" in 1967.

== Railways ==
Although the Standard Gauge Alston Line from Haltwhistle to Alston passed through Kirkhaugh, there was no station here when normal British Rail passenger services operated. The line opened in 1852 and closed in 1976.

Since 1983 a narrow-gauge railway has opened on part of the original trackbed. The railway, known as the South Tynedale Railway, is a 2-foot (0.61 m) gauge line and runs 5 miles (8.0 km) from Alston to Slaggyford, through a station at Kirkhaugh, and includes a viaduct over the River South Tyne.

== Religious sites ==
The church, rebuilt in 1869, is thought to be the only English church dedicated to the Holy Paraclete (that is, the Holy Spirit).

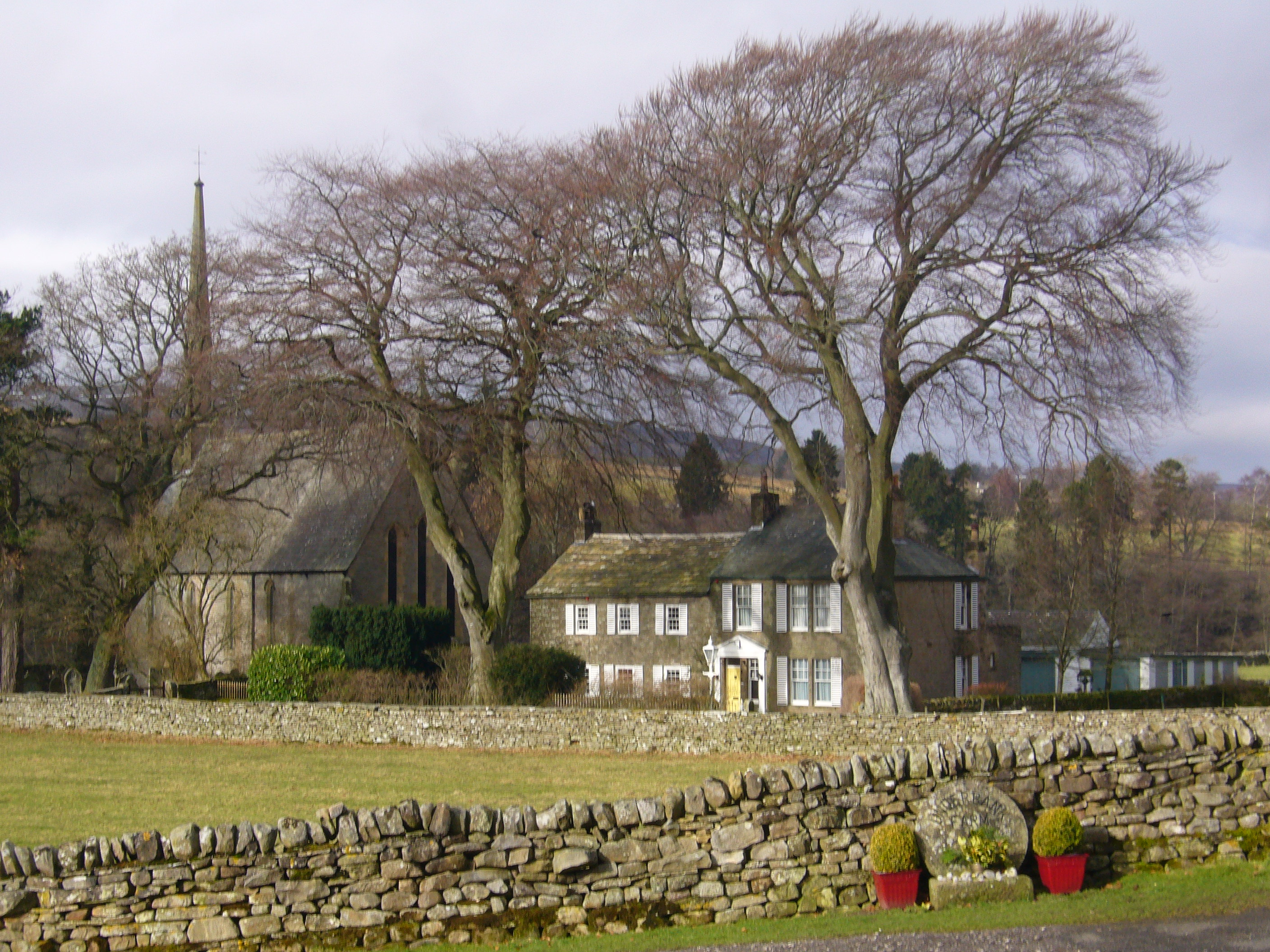
Church and old Rectory at Kirkhaugh, Northumberland February 2014

== See also ==
- Alston Line, the railway from Haltwhistle to Alston
- Kirkhaugh cairns, an archaeological site at Kirkhaugh
- South Tynedale Railway
