= Slaggyford =

Village in Northumberland, England

Coordinates: 54.866°N 2.508°W

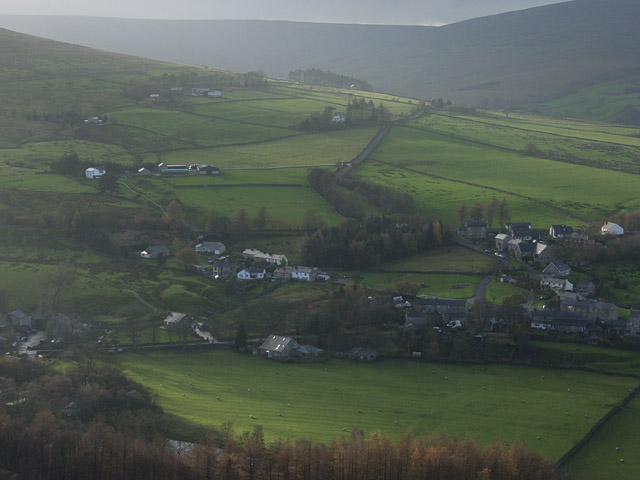

- Location within Northumberland
- OS grid reference: NY675525
- Civil parish: Knaresdale with Kirkhaugh
- Shire county: Northumberland
- Region: North East
- Country: England
- Sovereign state: United Kingdom
- Post town: BRAMPTON
- Postcode district: CA8
- Dialling code: 01434
- Police: Northumbria
- Fire: Northumberland
- Ambulance: North East
- UK Parliament: Hexham

Slaggyford is a village in the civil parish of Knaresdale with Kirkhaugh, in Northumberland, England about 5 miles (8 km) north of Alston, Cumbria.

It is set in the South Tyne valley (often called the Tyne Gap). Hadrian's Wall lies to the north of the Tyne Gap. The South Tyne Valley falls within the North Pennines Area of Outstanding Natural Beauty (AONB), the second largest of the 40 AONBs in England and Wales. Slaggyford takes its name from the Old English for ‘muddy, dirty ford’, which may originate from quickly moving river water stirring up the river bed at the bottom of a short steep hill, as the river drops from 1,000 feet (305 m) to 700 feet (213 m) from Alston to Slaggyford.

The Pennine Way runs through the village on its way northwards from Alston to Greenhead.

The Maiden Way Roman road passes through Slaggyford, with the A689 road following the line of the Roman road for a few hundred yards on the way south out of the village.

== Governance ==
Slaggyford is in the parliamentary constituency of Hexham. Joe Morris of the Labour Party is the Member of Parliament.

Up until Brexit, for the European Parliament its residents voted to elect MEP's for the North East England constituency.

For Local Government purposes it belongs to Northumberland County Council a unitary authority, with Slaggyford lying in the South Tynedale Division. Prior to the 2009 structural changes to local government in England it was part of Tynedale district. The village is within the civil parish of "Knaresdale with Kirkhaugh", from the parish's formation on 1 April 1955 to 3 August 1967 it was called "Slaggyford".

== Transport ==
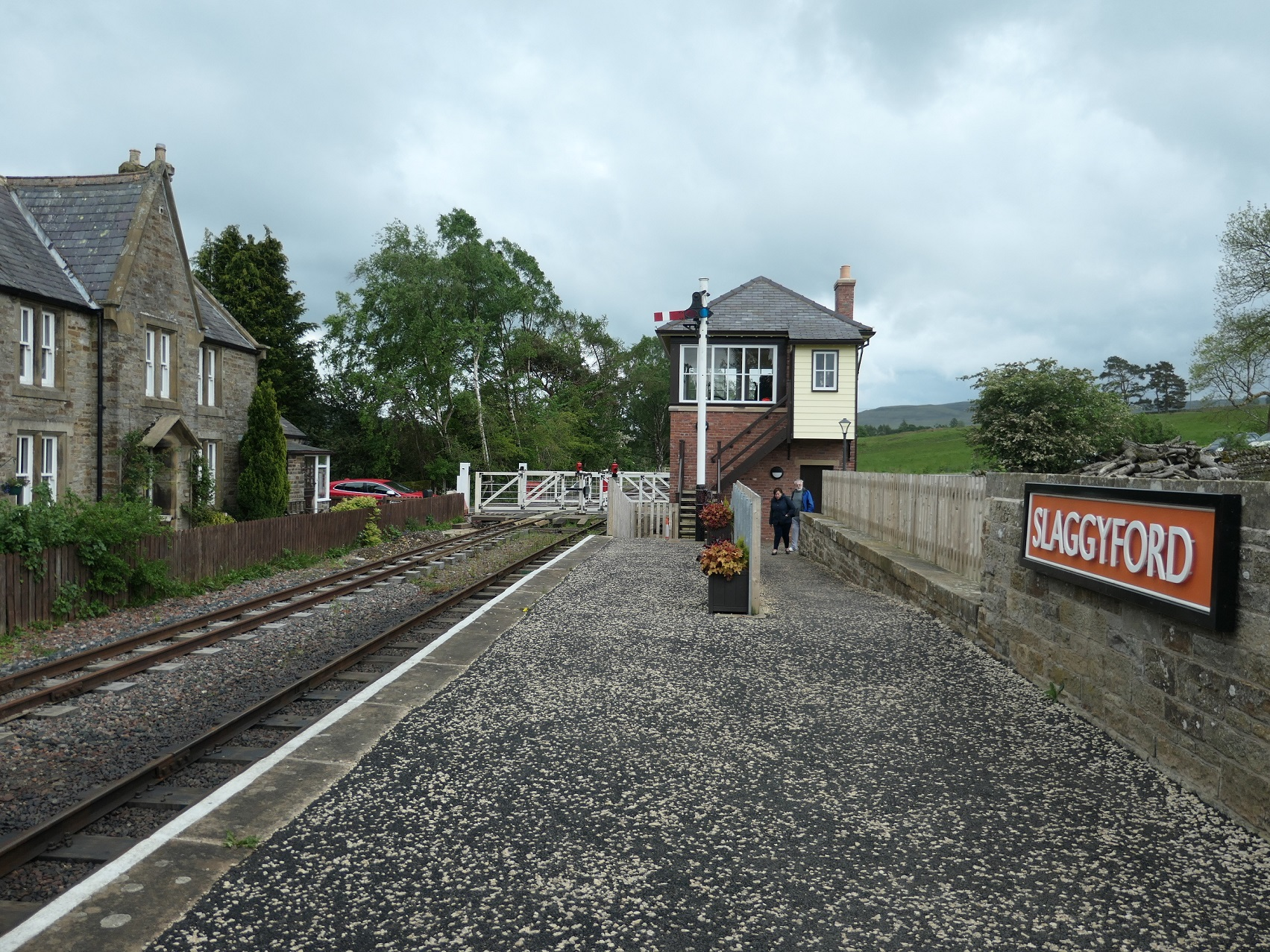
Slaggyford station in 2019

Slaggyford was served by a railway station on the Alston Line from Haltwhistle to Alston. The line opened in 1852 and closed in 1976.

Since 1983, a 2 foot (0.61 m) narrow gauge railway has been opened on part of the original track bed. It is called the South Tynedale Railway and currently runs for 5 miles (8 km) from Alston to the old station at Slaggyford and includes crossing three viaducts up the South Tyne Valley and over the River South Tyne.

Construction of the section of track from Lintley to Slaggyford was completed in July 2017, and as of June 2018 regular passenger trains had started to run from the station.

== See also ==
- Aules Hill Meadows, a Site of Special Scientific Interest 0.5 miles (0.80 km) west of the village
