= South Tynedale Railway =

Narrow-gauge railway in Northern England

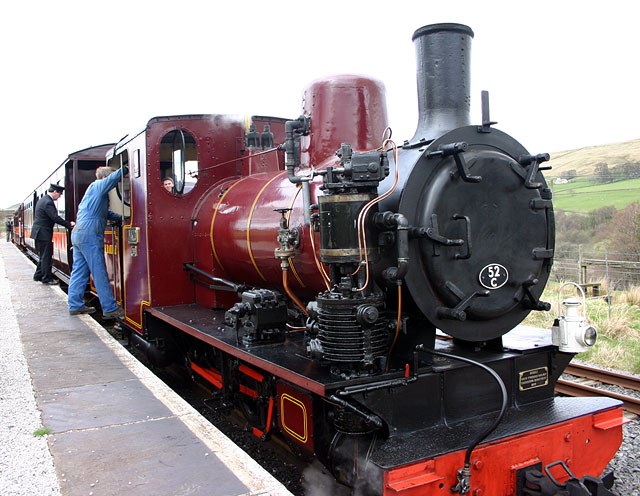
- Polish locomotive Nakło at Kirkhaugh Station
- Terminus: Slaggyford; Alston
- Coordinates: 54.840°N 2.474°W

Commercial operations
- Name: South Tynedale Railway
- Original gauge: 4 ft 8 1/2 in (1,435 mm) standard gauge

Preserved operations
- Stations: 4
- Length: 5 miles (8.0 km)
- Preserved gauge: 2 ft (610 mm)

Commercial history
- Closed: 3 May 1976

Preservation history
- 3 May 1976: Former branch line to Alston closed.
- 1977: STR Preservation Society turns attention to reconstruction of branch, to narrow gauge
- 30 July 1983: South Tynedale Railway opens to the Public, for the very first time.
- 1986: STR reaches Gilderdale
- 1996: Gilderdale-Kirkhaugh extension completed
- 4 September 1999: STR extends to Kirkhaugh, Gilderdale station closed after 13 years
- 2009: STR latest extension granted
- 1 April 2012: STR returns to Lintley Halt
- 11 June 2018: STR extends to Slaggyford

The South Tynedale Railway is a preserved, 2 ft (610 mm) narrow-gauge heritage railway in Northern England and at 875 feet (267 m) is England's second highest narrow-gauge railway after the Lynton and Barnstaple Railway in north Devon. The South Tynedale line runs from Alston in Cumbria, down the South Tyne Valley, via Gilderdale, Kirkhaugh and Lintley, then across the South Tyne, Gilderdale and Whitley Viaducts to Slaggyford in Northumberland.

== Former line ==
The narrow-gauge railway line is built on the track bed of the southern section of the former Alston Line, a standard gauge branch line between Haltwhistle and Alston which was closed by British Rail in May 1976.

== Operations ==
The railway is operated by a charity, The South Tynedale Railway Preservation Society, which was registered in 1983.

Passenger trains operate on the railway from Spring to Autumn and attract 40,000 people to the district every year. Information about exact dates are on the railway's web site. Special trains operate including Santa Special trains on certain days in December each year. Although no Santa trains ran in 2011 as volunteer efforts were put into completing the extension to Lintley in time for the 2012 season, they ran again in 2012 on two successive weekends, 15–16 and 22–23 December. In 2013 Santa trains ran on 14–15 and 21–22 December.

At Alston station there is a cafe and gift shop both operated by the railway company. Free car and coach parking is available adjacent to the station which is located about 1/4 mile (0.40 km) north of the town on Hexham road.

The line is currently 5 miles (8.0 km) in length, having been extended by a further 1 1/4 miles (2.0 km) to Slaggyford in July 2017. The STR is built on the southern section of the trackbed of the disused 4 ft 8 1/2 in (1,435 mm) standard gauge Haltwhistle to Alston Branch Line, which formerly connected with the Newcastle and Carlisle Railway at Haltwhistle.

The popular South Tyne Trail shares the trackbed with the railway, fenced off for safety. It is a walking and cycle trail that provides a cut-off for part of its length for the Pennine Way national trail.

The standard gauge branch line was closed by British Rail on 1 May 1976. The track bed is mostly intact, except at Lambley, where the station house and garden are in private ownership, and near Haltwhistle, where construction of the A69 Haltwhistle by-pass road severed the trackbed on the bypass itself and on an adjoining secondary road. The Society hope to eventually reopen the branch all the way to Haltwhistle.

== Signalling Infrastructure ==
The signal box at Alston was dismantled when British Rail closed the branch so a new box had to be sought and erected. The replacement signal box at Alston formerly stood at Ainderby, on the branch line to Redmire, prior to being acquired from British Rail and re-erected on a new brick base. The level crossing barriers and mechanism came from the now-closed How Mill Station on the Newcastle and Carlisle line.

The signal box houses a 21 lever frame, made by McKenzie and Holland. In addition there is a manually operated gate machine to control the level crossing barriers – this combination of manual gate wheel and lifting barriers (rather than gates) being somewhat rare in the UK. The frame has had a varied life as it was constructed for the Highland Railway by McK&H and first installed at Kingussie in Scotland. It was removed in 1926 when a replacement level crossing mechanism was installed in an emergency.

The frame had developed a crack and had to be sent to England to be repaired by Westinghouse, which had taken over McKenzie and Holland in 1920. The frame was then installed on the North Staffordshire Section of the LMS when a road at a level crossing was realigned to cross the railway. The old frame with the gate mechanism at this box was inadequate because of worn bearings so the repaired spare frame from Kingussie was installed by Westinghouse. It remained in service until the NS signal box closed. The frame was then sold to the South Tynedale railway and installed at its present location.

The signals are standard BR ones using a former LMS design, although the signal to the carriage sidings is an unusual semaphore ground signal mounted onto a conventional signal post.

== Developments ==
Confirmation was received in November 2009 that a grant of £100,000 had been awarded by the Groundwork UK Community Spaces programme which will be used to fund the restoration of three historic railway bridges on the former Haltwhistle to Alston line. Northumberland County Council's west area committee also granted consent for a completely new station at Lintley and the new extension to Lintley opened to traffic on 1 April 2012. Rails extend across Lintley viaduct for a distance of about 200 metres (650 ft) from the new station to form a headshunt for works trains.

The extended line from Kirkhaugh to Lintley Halt was officially opened in Saturday 12 May 2012 by Lord Inglewood, a long-time friend of the railway society.

On the same day Cumbria County Council handed over documents confirming a Community Asset Transfer of the Society's leased land in Cumbria. Work to gain a similar status in Northumberland is ongoing with Northumberland County Council.

In September 2012 the Heritage Lottery Fund made an award that allows development work on a full bid for the Slaggyford extension to proceed. The bid also included innovative 'green' initiatives to update the railway's buildings, equipment and infrastructure in and around Alston. The outcome of the bid is anticipated in January 2014.

In December 2012 a serious wash-out of a retaining wall about 50 metres (160 ft) north of Alston Station threatened to stop the popular Santa trains. Quick work by the railway's track gang to skew the main running line saved the day. The STR was left with a significant fund-raising issue to fully repair the 160-year-old wall, restore the lineside footpath and return the line to use. Temporary repairs were completed by mid-January 2013 whilst fundraising efforts continued to achieve a full repair. The main line was moved back to its proper alignment before the 2013 season began.

During January 2013 the railway society's ambitions that, one day, trains will again run all the way from Alston to Haltwhistle moved a couple of steps closer. British Railways Board (Residuary) Ltd. improved upon and changed an earlier offer that now transfers a 7-metre (23 ft) wide strip of land to the society. The land runs parallel to the Alston bay platform at Haltwhistle mainline station and provides sufficient space for proper station and run-round facilities for narrow-gauge trains. This important step allows the society to approach Network Rail for agreement to use its land alongside the platform and the platform itself. Additionally a small parcel of land that allows access to the station area from the Alston Arches Viaduct will be made available to the railway society.

In early February, the South Tynedale Railway joined the Heritage Skills Initiative and an engineering skills trainee will join the South Tynedale's mainly volunteer workforce in March. The one-year project is in partnership with the North of England Civic Trust backed by a bursary and supported by the Heritage Lottery Fund. The scheme is specifically aimed at overcoming skills shortages in traditional engineering crafts. The new trainee will work alongside the railway's skilled volunteer engineers looking after the railway's locomotives and rolling stock. The new member of the railway's team concentrated on developing a new works train to support the STR's specialist permanent way team as they prepared for work on the 1 1/4 miles (2.0 km) extension from Lintley Halt to Slaggyford. The opening of the new extension was delayed, and finally opened in June 2018.

At the Annual General Meeting in November 2013 the railway society's chairman signed agreements that handed responsibility for the viaducts at Lambley and Haltwhistle to the society. They were formerly owned by the now defunct North Pennine Heritage Trust. This important acquisition lays down further building blocks towards the society's aim to eventually reopen the full length of the branch line.

On 4 February 2014 the STR announced a £5.5 million development project that includes just over £4.2 million awarded by the Heritage Lottery Fund.(source HLF and STR press information releases).

=== 2020 closure and administration ===
The railway did not operate at all during 2020 due to the COVID-19 pandemic and in September 2020 the operating company, South Tynedale Railway Ltd, went into administration. The attraction was awarded emergency funding from the Government, and resumed operations in July 2021, initially at weekends only.

== Stations ==
Point	Coordinates (Links to map resources)	OS Grid Ref	Notes
Alston	54.815°N 2.442°W	NY7159846782	
Kirkhaugh	54.84033°N 2.47479°W	NY6951049614	
Lintley Halt	54.8536°N 2.4882°W	NY6866051097	
Slaggyford	54.8653°N 2.5065°W	NY6749452407	

== Locomotives ==
=== Steam ===
- Nakło – Polish built 0-6-0T+T No. 10 of 1957 – in ticket and operational, restoration completed 2025.
- Green Dragon – Hunslet 0-4-2T No. 16 of 1937 – in ticket and operational, restoration completed in 2018.
- Barber – Thomas Green & Son 0-6-2ST No. 441 of 1908 – awaiting overhaul

=== Diesel ===
- Naworth Hudswell Clarke 0-6-0DM No. 4 of 1952 – operational.
- Hunslet 0-4-0DM No. 9 of 1952 – operational.
- Cumbria Hunslet 4wDM No. 11 of 1967 – operational.
- Old Rusty Hudswell Clarke 0-6-0DM No. 18 of 1961 – operational.

=== Battery ===
- Carlisle Clayton 4wBE No 21 – operational.
- Newcastle Clayton 4wBE No 22 – operational.

=== Former locomotives ===
- Thomas Edmondson – Henschel 0-4-0T No. 6 of 1918 – (Returned to Germany)
- MLR Class ML 740 – Orenstein & Koppel 0-6-0T No. 2343 of 1907 – Moved to Darnell Locomotive and Railway Heritage Group.
- NG25 Baguley-Drewry 4wBE No. 3704 of 1973 – Not on railway website.

== Passenger rolling stock ==
Trains are made up daily depending on predicted passenger numbers. There are four all-steel open-ended gallery coaches built by a contractor in Alston, two wooden-bodied coaches and two brake vans constructed in the railway workshops. Additions to the fleet in 2011 were an all-steel buffet coach, originally built by Gloucester Carriage and Wagon for Sierra Leone Railways, and re-gauged from 750 mm (2 ft 5 1/2 in) to 610 mm (2 ft) for use at Alston, and a re-gauged former Romanian steel coach now converted to be fully accessible for disabled passengers.
