= Greenhead railway station =

Disused railway station in Northumberland on the Tyne Valley Line

Greenhead
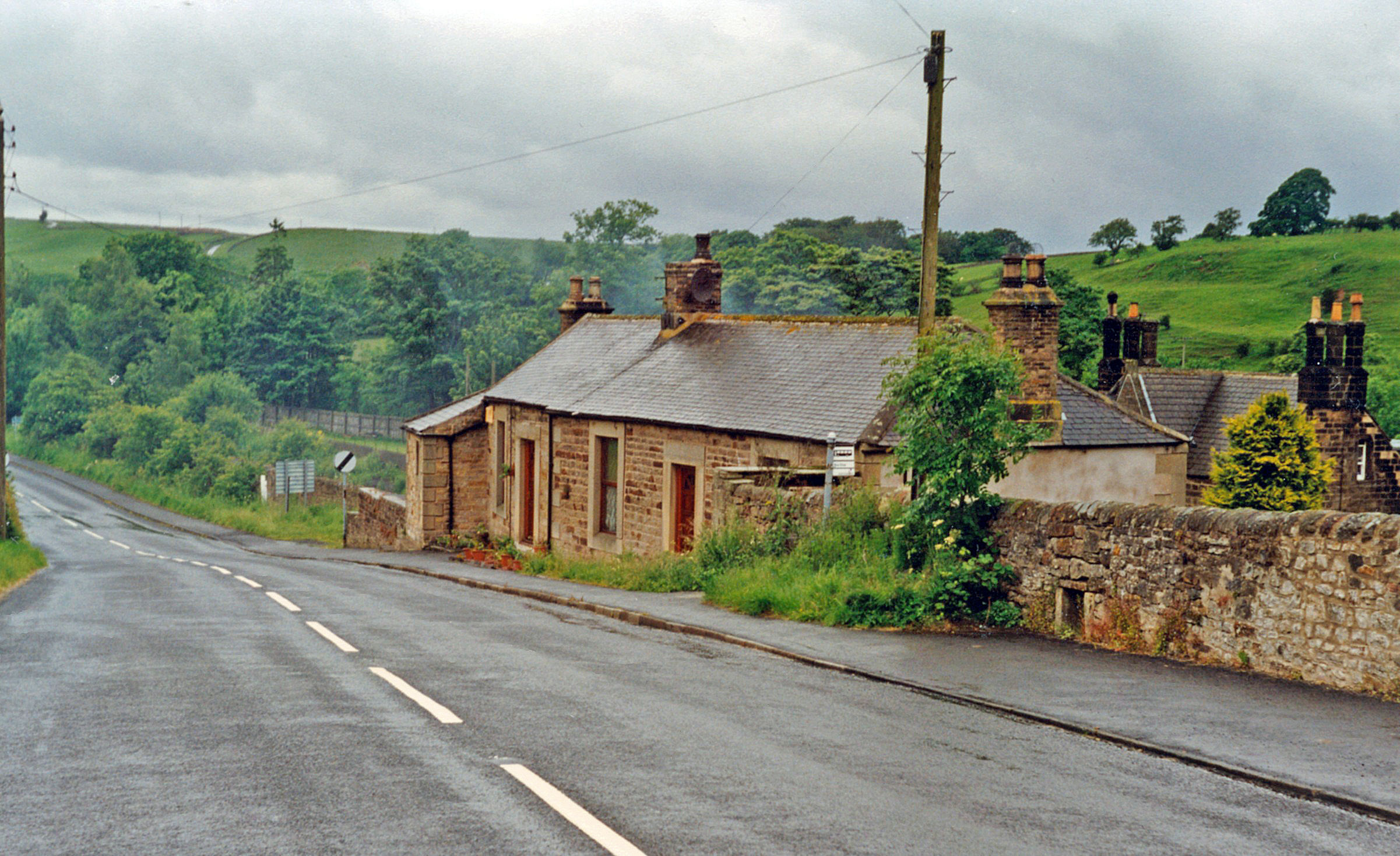

General information
- Location: Greenhead, Northumberland; England
- Coordinates: 54°58′58″N 2°32′03″W
- Grid reference: NY659654
- Platforms: 2
- Tracks: 2

Other information
- Status: Disused

History
- Original company: Newcastle and Carlisle Railway
- Pre-grouping: North Eastern Railway
- Post-grouping: London and North Eastern Railway; British Rail (Eastern Region)

Key dates
- 20 July 1836: Opened
- 2 January 1967: Closed
Location

Greenhead was a former railway station, which served the village of Greenhead, Northumberland in Northumberland between 1836 and 1967.

== History ==
The station opened on 20 July 1836 by the Newcastle and Carlisle Railway. On the east side was the goods yard and to the south was a locomotive shed and Blenkinsopp Colliery. The station closed on 2 January 1967. A coal station still survives in the goods yard.

Preceding station	Historical railways	Following station
Haltwhistle	North Eastern Railway; Newcastle and Carlisle Railway	Gilsland
