= Haltwhistle railway station =

Railway station in Northumberland, England

Haltwhistle
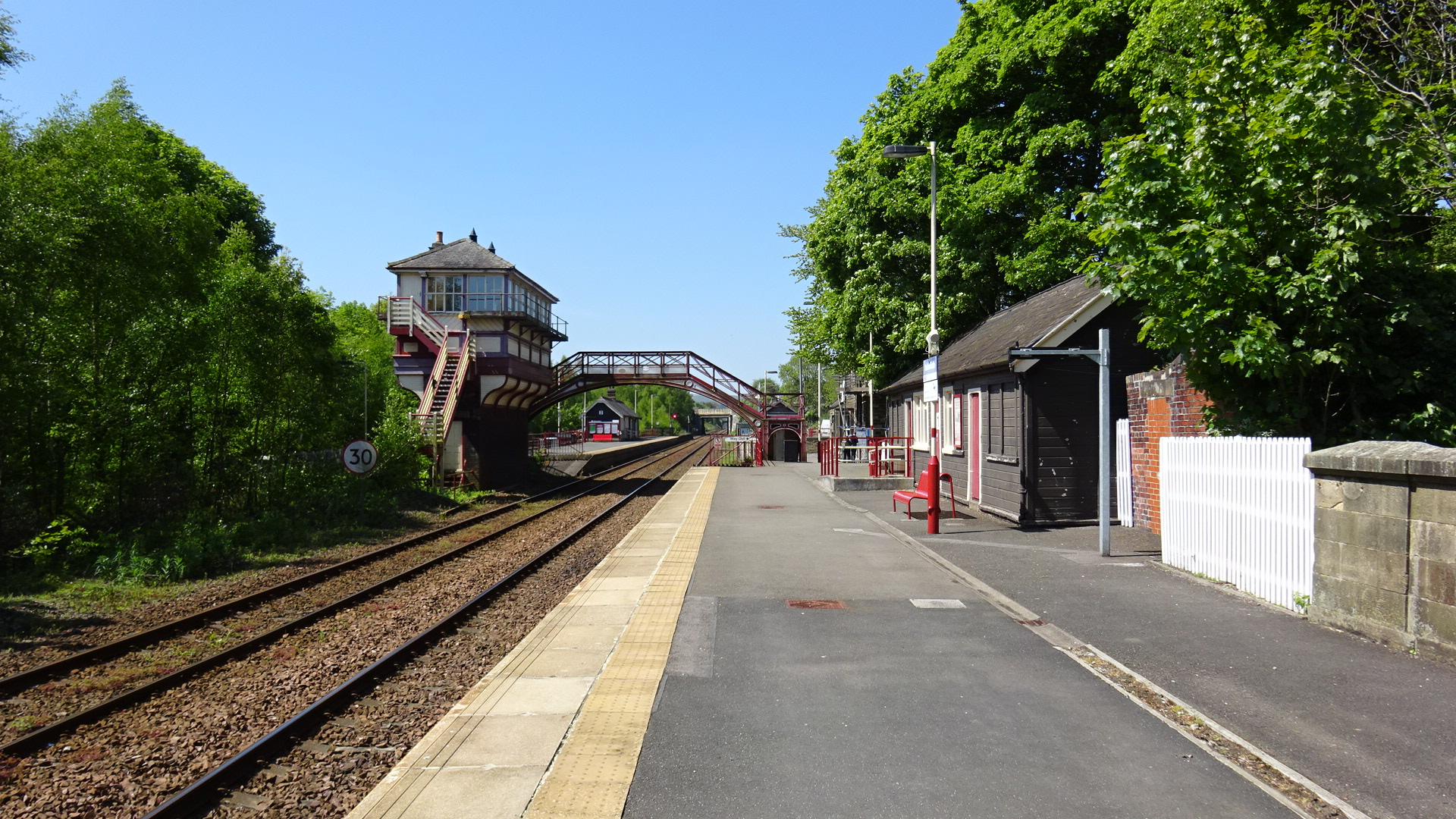

General information
- Location: Haltwhistle, Northumberland; England
- Coordinates: 54°58′05″N 2°27′46″W
- Grid reference: NY704638
- Owner: Network Rail
- Manager: Northern Trains
- Platforms: 2
- Tracks: 2

Other information
- Station code: HWH
- Classification: DfT category F1

History
- Original company: Newcastle and Carlisle Railway
- Pre-grouping: North Eastern Railway
- Post-grouping: London and North Eastern Railway; British Rail (North Eastern Region)

Key dates
- 18 June 1838: Opened

Passengers
- 2020/21: ▼21,922
- 2021/22: ▲68,360
- 2022/23: ▲77,010
- 2023/24: ▲82,462
- 2024/25: ▲96,252
Location
- Location within Northumberland
Notes
- Passenger statistics from the Office of Rail and Road

Haltwhistle is a railway station on the Tyne Valley Line, which runs between Newcastle and Carlisle via Hexham. The station, situated 22 miles 66 chains (22.8 mi; 36.7 km) east of Carlisle, serves the market town of Haltwhistle in Northumberland, England. It is owned by Network Rail and managed by Northern Trains.

== History ==
The Newcastle and Carlisle Railway was formed in 1829, and was opened in stages. The station was opened in June 1838, following the opening of the line between Greenhead and Haydon Bridge. The station is thought to be the work of the line's resident engineer, John Blackmore.

In 1852, the station became a junction, with the opening of the Newcastle and Carlisle Railway's branch line to Alston. Following the demise of the line and closure of the coal depot in the late 1970s, the track layout was simplified. The former bay platform remains, but without track.

Haltwhistle was reduced to an unstaffed halt in 1967, along with most of the other stations on the line that escaped the Beeching Axe. The station has retained its water tower, water crane, main buildings, signal box and original wooden shelters – several of which are Grade II listed.

The station's signal box, constructed in 1901 by the North Eastern Railway, was taken out of use in 1993, following re-signalling to colour lights. It was replaced by a smaller prefabricated signal box, which is located around 145 yards (133 m) to the west of the former.

As of October 2020, in a project led by the Tyne Valley Community Rail Partnership, work is underway to refurbish the station's former waiting room buildings – at a cost of £500,000. The project will see improved waiting areas for passengers, as well as new office and studio space.

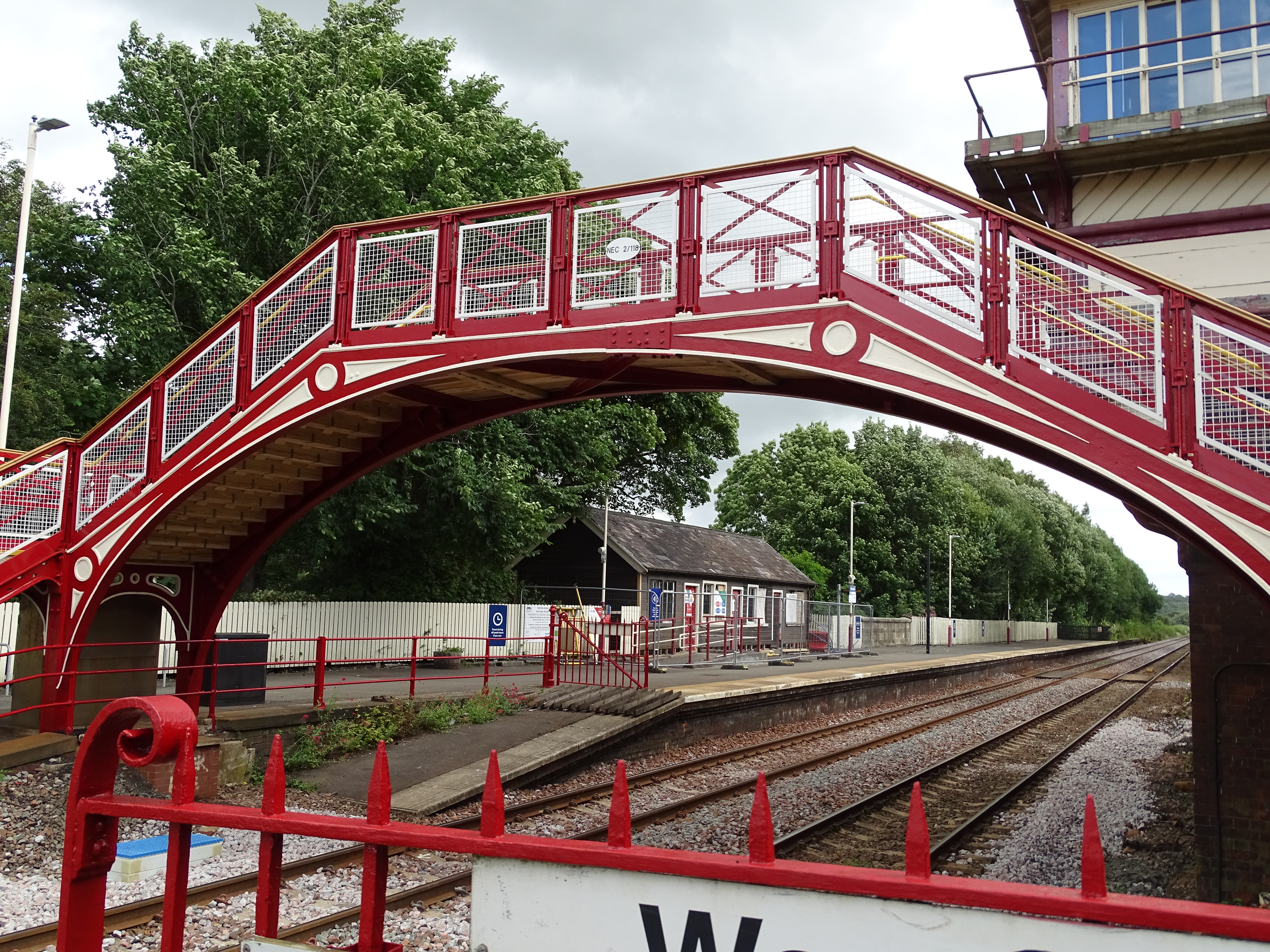
The refurbished footbridge in August 2021

During early 2021, the footbridge between the two platforms was refurbished.

== Facilities ==
The station has two platforms, both of which have a ticket machine (which accepts card or contactless payment only), seating, waiting shelter, next train audio and visual displays and an emergency help point. There is step-free access to both platforms by road underbridge, with both platforms also being linked by a footbridge. There is a small car park at the station.

Haltwhistle is part of the Northern Trains penalty fare network, meaning that a valid ticket or promise to pay notice is required prior to boarding the train.

== Services ==
As of the December 2025 timetable, there is a twice-hourly service (hourly on Sundays) between Newcastle and Carlisle via Hexham. Some trains extend to Middlesbrough via Hartlepool. All services are operated by Northern Trains.

Rolling stock used: Class 156 Super Sprinter and Class 158 Express Sprinter

Preceding station	National Rail	Following station
Bardon Mill towards Newcastle	Northern Trains; Tyne Valley Line	Brampton towards Carlisle
	Historical railways	
Bardon Mill	North Eastern Railway; Newcastle and Carlisle Railway	Greenhead
	Disused railways	
Terminus	North Eastern Railway; Alston branch line	Featherstone Park
Terminus	North Eastern Railway; Alston branch line	Plenmeller Halt

== Alston Line ==
The station was formerly the terminus of the Alston branch line, which ran for 13 miles (21 km) from Haltwhistle to the town of Alston in Cumbria. Originally built to access the mines around Alston, the line never fulfilled its economic potential. It was originally marked for closure in the 1960s, under the Beeching plan, however the lack of an all-weather road kept it open. Following improvements to the road network in the 1970s, the station, along with the line, was closed on 3 May 1976 by the British Railways Board.

The track was lifted the following year, after a preservation attempt by the South Tynedale Railway Preservation Society proved to be unsuccessful. The society did eventually succeed in buying part of the line, with the South Tynedale Railway narrow-gauge heritage railway opening on 30 July 1983.

The path of the branch line follows the Pennine Way for some of its route, and was mentioned by Alfred Wainwright in his Pennine Way Companion.
