= Alston line =

Partially operational railway line in Cumbria and Northumberland

Alston Line
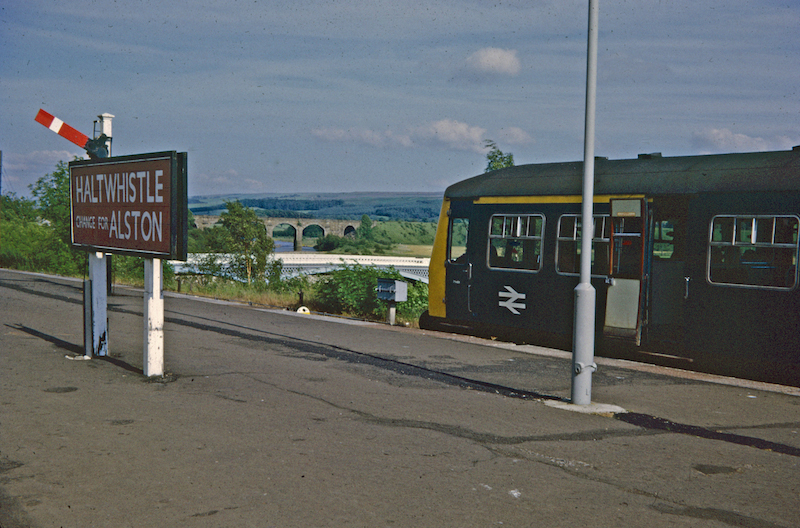

Overview
- Status: Operational between Alston and Slaggyford
- Locale: Cumbria; Northumberland
- Termini: Alston; Haltwhistle
- Former connections: Brampton Railway (1851–1953); Newcastle and Carlisle Railway (1851–1976)

Service
- Type: Heavy rail (1851–1976); Light rail (1983–)
- Operator(s): South Tynedale Railway

History
- Commenced: March 1851
- Completed: November 1852
- Closed: 3 May 1976
- Reopened: 30 July 1983 (as South Tynedale Railway)

Technical
- Line length: 13 miles (21 km)
- Number of tracks: Single track
- Track gauge: 4 ft 8 1/2 in (1,435 mm) standard gauge (1851–1976); 2 ft (610 mm) narrow gauge (1983–)

The Alston Line was a 13-mile (21 km) single-track branch line, which linked Haltwhistle in Northumberland with Alston in Cumbria.

The line was constructed in the early 1850s by the Newcastle and Carlisle Railway, opening in stages. Construction of the line was completed in November 1852, following the opening of Lambley Viaduct.

Since the line's closure, a 5-mile (8 km) section of the line has since reopened in stages between Slaggyford and Alston, with heritage services operated by the South Tynedale Railway.

== History ==
The Newcastle and Carlisle Railway was formed in 1829, opening to passengers in stages from March 1835. A branch line from Haltwhistle to Alston and Nenthead was first considered in 1841, with the line authorised by an Act of Parliament in August 1846. It was later decided that a line operating as far as Alston was sufficient, with the amended route approved by a further Act in July 1849.

In March 1851, the 4½-mile section from Haltwhistle to Shaft Hill (which was later renamed Coanwood) was opened to goods traffic, with passenger services commencing in July 1851. The 8¼-mile section of the line between Alston and Lambley opened to goods traffic in January 1852, along with a short branch to Lambley Fell, with passenger services commencing in May 1852.

Construction of the branch line was completed in November 1852, following the opening of the Lambley Viaduct (now Grade II* listed) over the River South Tyne.

== Route ==
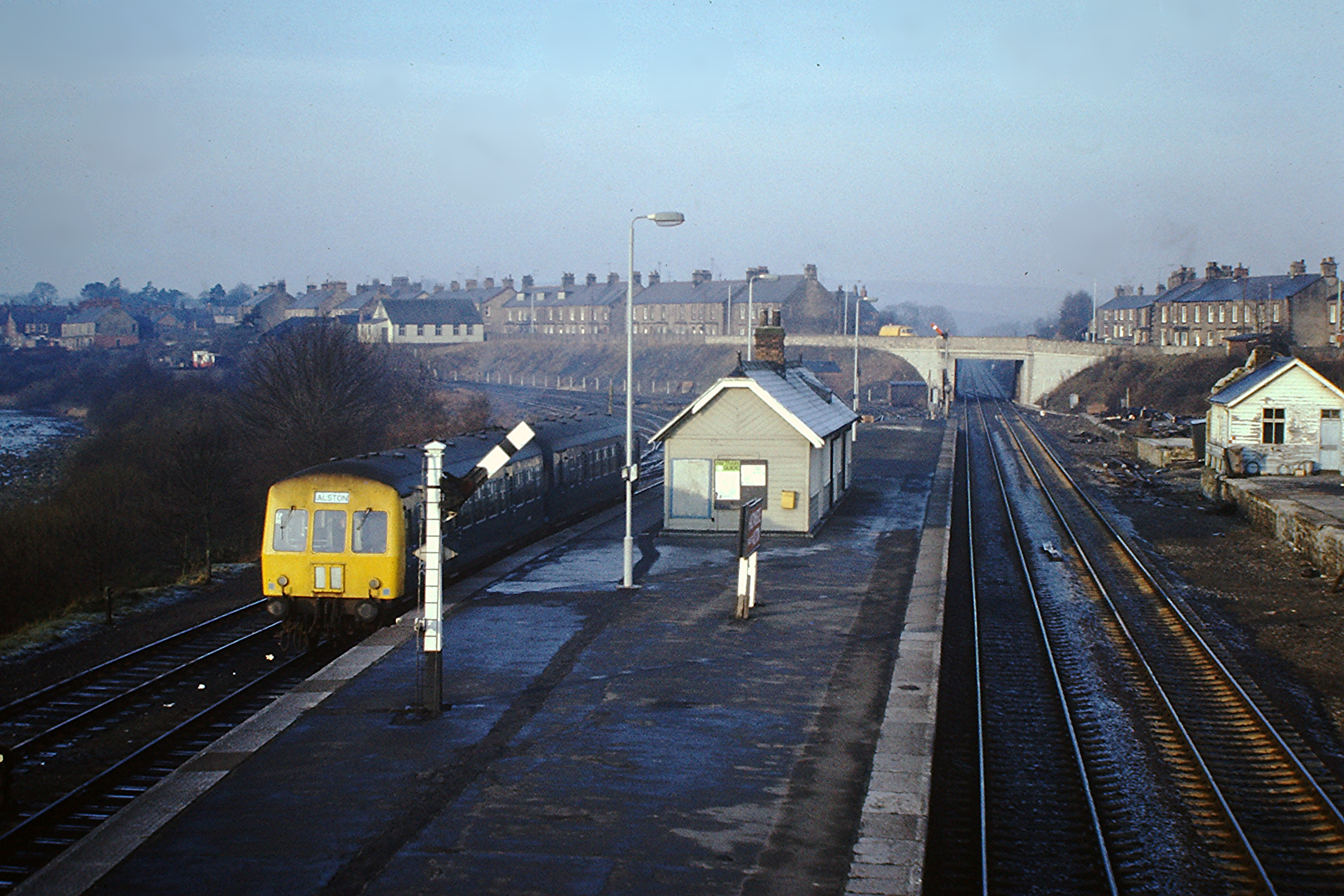
DMU at Haltwhistle station in March 1976

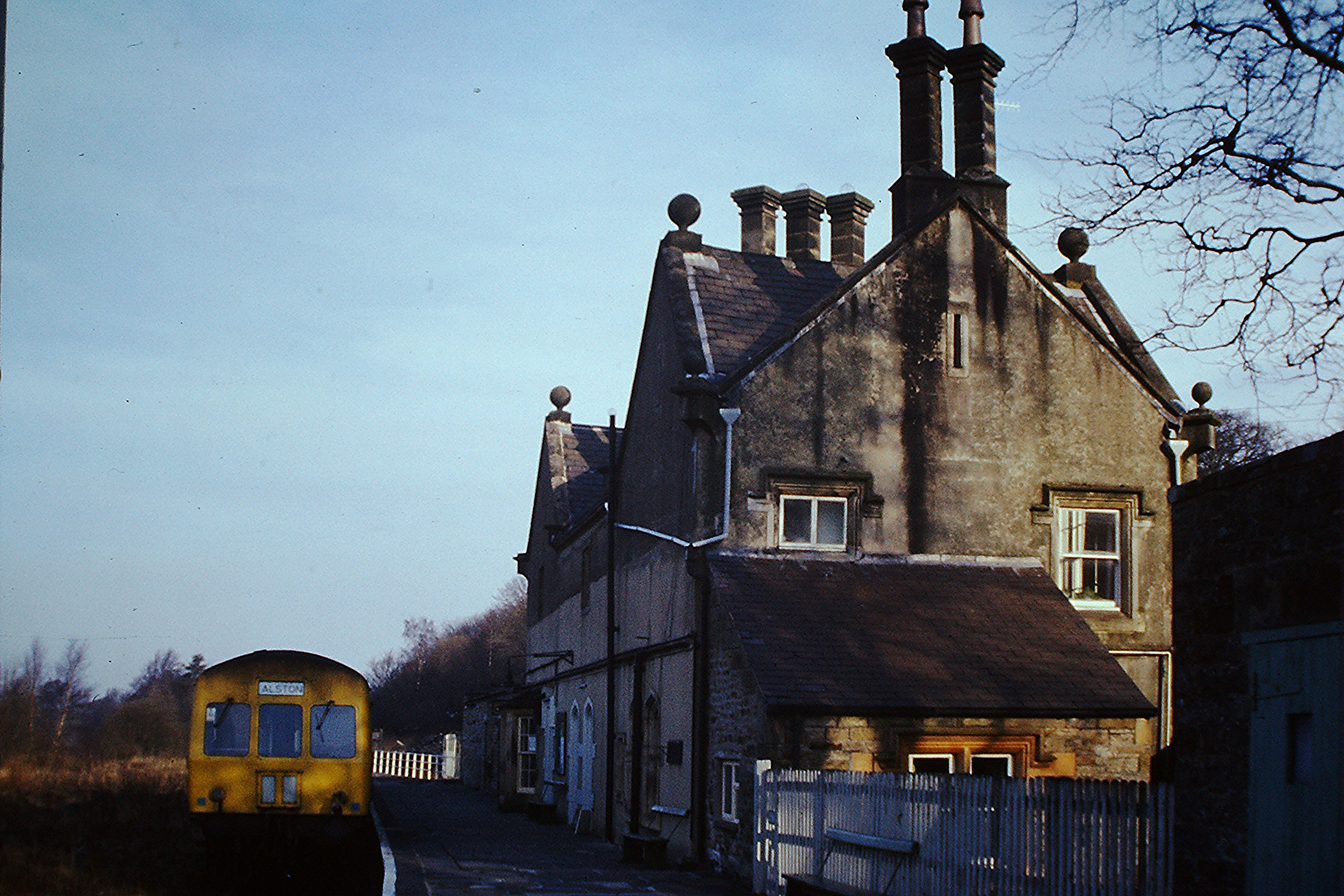
Alston station in March 1976

The line ran from a bay platform at Haltwhistle, where it met with the Newcastle and Carlisle Railway. From Haltwhistle, the line diverged south towards the Alston Arches Viaduct over the River South Tyne. The impressive stone structure, designed by Sir George Barclay Bruce, is now Grade II listed.

Between Haltwhistle and Featherstone Park, there were two unadvertised calling points, at Park Village and Plenmeller Halt. A platform was extant at Plenmeller Halt from the early 1920s until the late 1940s, however trains regularly stopped to allow passengers to board and alight long after the halt's official closure. No such facilities existed at Park Village.

From Plenmeller Halt, the line climbed at a gradient of 1 in 70 to Featherstone Park. At this point, the line passed close to the Grade I listed Featherstone Castle. At Coanwood, the line was 4 miles from the junction station at Haltwhistle.

Before serving Lambley, where the line met the Brampton Railway until 1953, the line crossed the imposing Lambley Viaduct. The Grade II* listed stone structure, which spans a length of 850 feet (260 m) over the River South Tyne, remains a prominent landmark. After Lambley, the line served a number of unadvertised calling points, including those at Burnstones, Softley and Whitwham. Trains regularly stopped to allow passengers to board and alight, despite no platform or facilities being situated at any of these locations.

At Slaggyford, the line is 8½ miles from Haltwhistle. Following the station's reopening in June 2018, Slaggyford now serves as a terminus of the South Tynedale Railway. From Slaggyford, the South Tynedale Railway serves two intermediate stations at Lintley Halt and Kirkhaugh, both of which were purpose-built for the narrow-gauge railway.

Crossing Gilderdale Burn Viaduct, the line leaves Northumberland and enters into Cumbria. Gilderdale served as another purpose-built intermediate station for the South Tynedale Railway from December 1986, closing when the line was extended to Kirkhaugh in September 1999. Alston Bridge serves as the final river crossing over the South Tyne, before reaching the terminus in the market town of Alston, having climbed continuously from Haltwhistle to an altitude of about 1,000 feet (300 m).

== Demise and closure ==
In the 1950s, freight services were withdrawn from Coanwood, with most stations on the line being downgraded to unstaffed halt status by the early 1960s. After the line's goods services were withdrawn in the early 1960s, the line ran as a siding – a simple railway with no signals other than those at the junction with the Newcastle and Carlisle Railway at Haltwhistle.

Rolling stock in the early 1960s consisted of a single Class 101 diesel multiple unit, which was based at Blaydon. A German-built Waggon und Maschinenbau railbus was unsuccessfully trialled on the line in 1965, which proved to be unreliable, as well as being unable to haul parcel vans.

Although mentioned in the ‘Reshaping of British Railways’, also known as the Beeching plan, the line was in fact already being considered for closure by the time this was published in 1963. The lack of an all-weather road, however, kept it open. Following improvements to the road network, including a temporary level crossing over the branch at Lambley, the line was closed on 3 May 1976 by the British Railways Board, with the last train working two days earlier. The line was replaced in part by a bus service, which was operated by Ribble Motor Services.

== Preservation ==
The track was lifted in the year following closure, after a preservation attempt by the South Tynedale Railway Preservation Society proved to be unsuccessful. The society did eventually succeed in buying part of the line, with a narrow-gauge railway opened on the former alignment of the line between Alston and Gilderdale in 1983.

The line has since been extended across the border into Northumberland, and now operates along a 5-mile (8 km) section of the former Alston Line from Alston to Slaggyford. The line was opened in stages, reaching Gilderdale in December 1986, Kirkhaugh in September 1999, Lintley Halt in April 2012, and Slaggyford in June 2018.

It is the eventual aim of the South Tynedale Railway for the narrow-gauge railway to serve the length of the former Alston Line, restoring the rail link between Haltwhistle and Alston. However, the track bed has been severed at two points near to the junction at Haltwhistle, by the A69 Haltwhistle Bypass and the removal of a former bridge on a minor road nearby.

The South Tynedale Railway regularly runs a steam service, using a pair of German-built Henschel engines, named Helen Kathryn and Thomas Edmondson. Owing to the COVID-19 pandemic, services did not run during the 2020 season.

== See also ==
- Brampton Railway
- Newcastle and Carlisle Railway
- South Tynedale Railway

== Sources ==
- Butt, R. V. J. (1995). The Directory of Railway Stations. Patrick Stephens Ltd. ISBN 1-85260-508-1
- Jenkins, S. C. (2001). The Alston Branch. Oakwood Press. ISBN 978-0-85361-574-3
