= Lambley Viaduct =

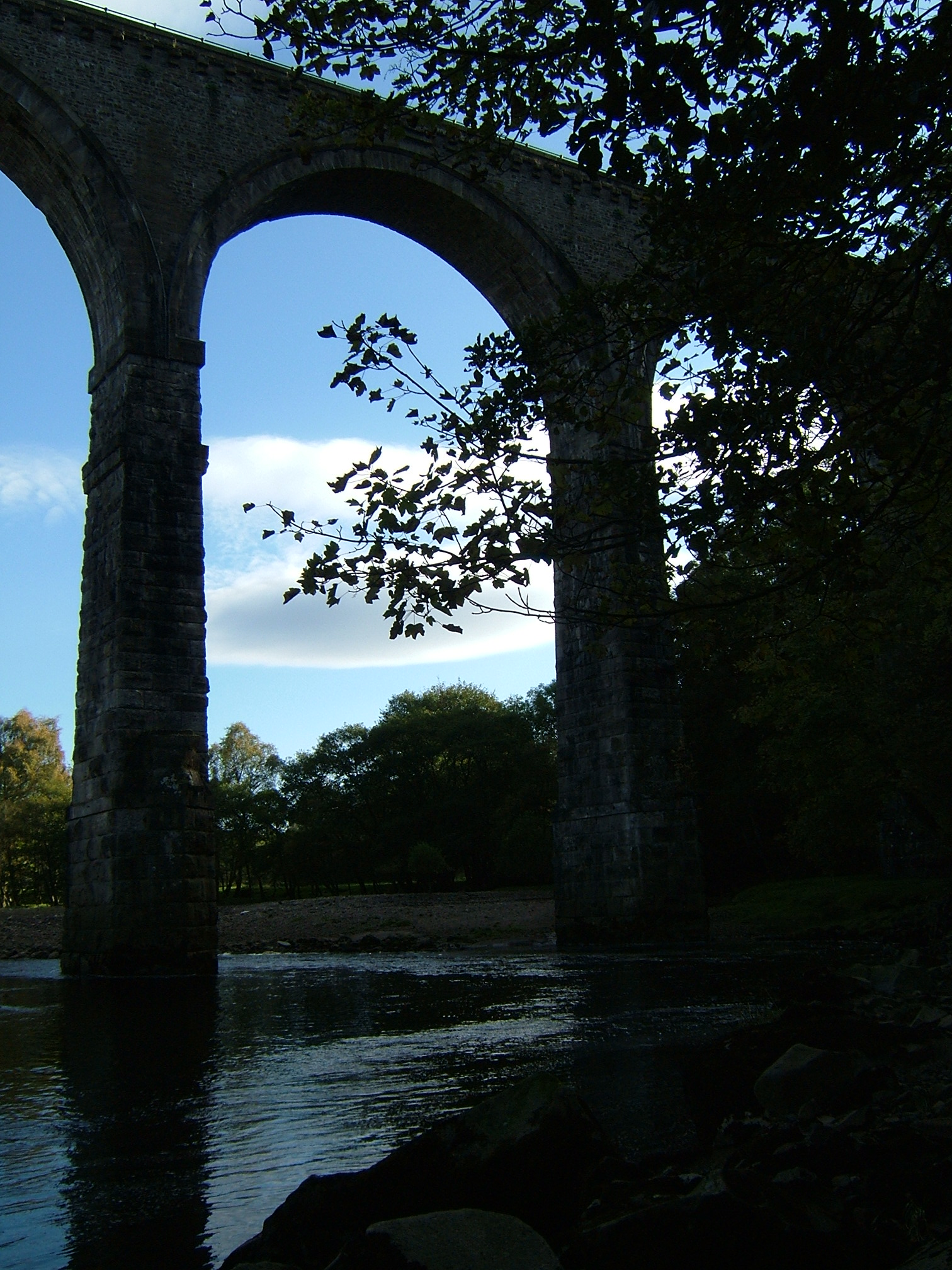
- Lambley Viaduct in October 2011
- Coordinates: 54.9190°N 2.5085°W
- OS grid reference: NY675584
- Carries: 68; Pedestrians; (Formerly, Alston line)
- Crosses: River South Tyne
- Locale: Northumberland
- Preceded by: Eals Footbridge
- Followed by: Lambley Footbridge

Characteristics
- Material: Stone
- Total length: 260 m (850 ft)
- Width: 3.5 m (11 ft)
- Height: At least 33 m (108 ft)
- No. of spans: 9
- Piers in water: 3

History
- Designer: Probably Sir George Barclay Bruce
- Construction end: 1852
- Opened: 17 November 1852
- Closed: 3 May 1976, as a railway

National Heritage List for England
- Type: Grade II listed building
- Designated: 23 August 1985
- Reference no.: 1042918

Location
- Interactive map of Lambley Viaduct

Lambley Viaduct is a stone bridge across the River South Tyne at Lambley in Northumberland. Formerly a railway bridge, it remains open to pedestrians but one end of the viaduct has been fenced off.

== History ==
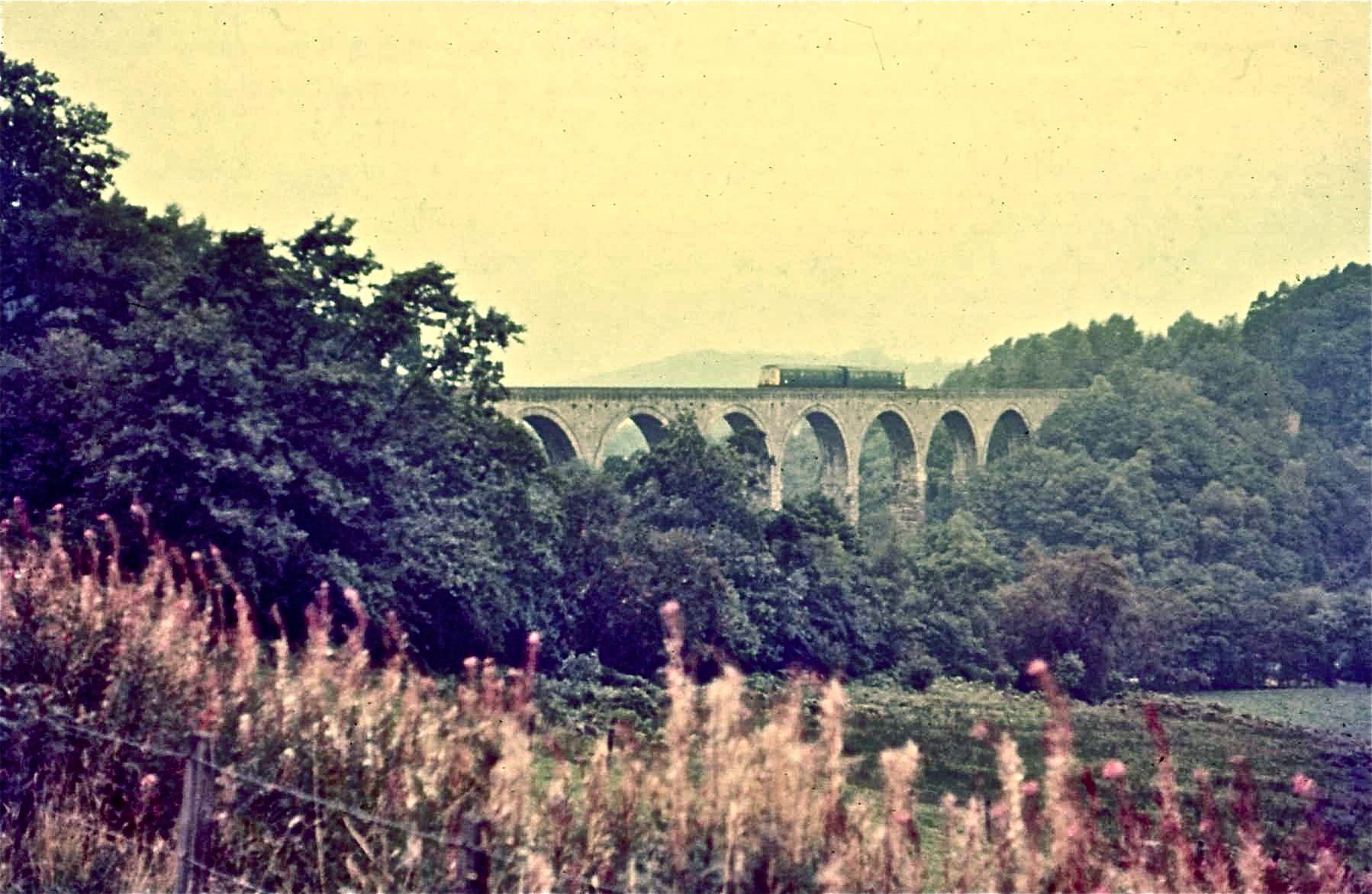
A train crossing the viaduct in September 1973

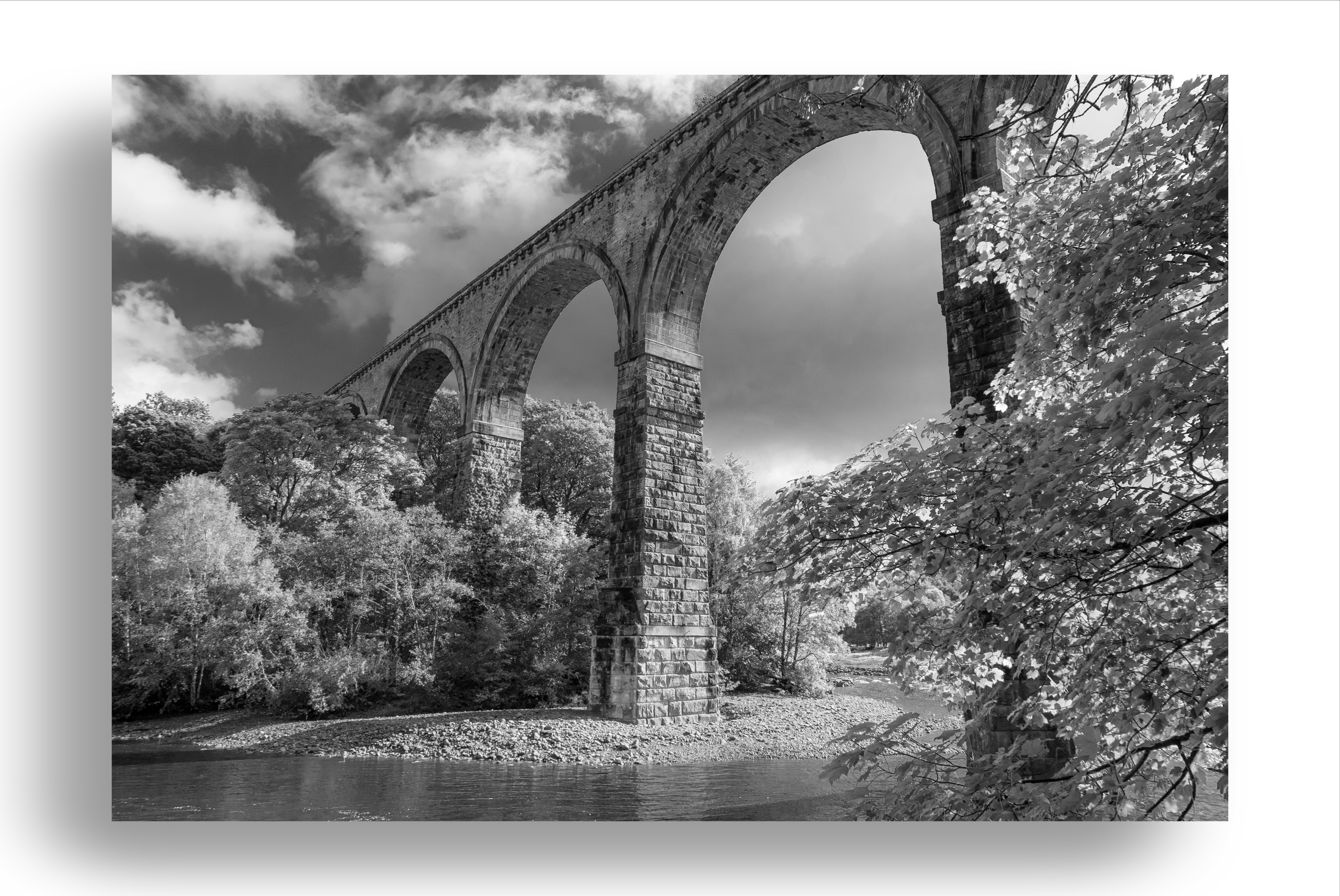
Lambley Viaduct 2024

Lambley viaduct crosses the River South Tyne as a series of elegant stone arches. More than 260 m (850 ft) long, it was one of nine viaducts on the former Haltwhistle to Alston railway. This was opened in 1852 to haul coal and lead from the Alston mines, closed in 1976, and the viaduct was allowed to decay. In 1991 the British Rail Property Board agreed to repair the viaduct and hand it over to the North Pennine Heritage Trust which would maintain it in the future; however the Trust went into administration in 2011.

The viaduct was probably designed by George Barclay Bruce, a Victorian engineer who was involved in the Alston line before leaving for India to pioneer railway construction there. It is a particularly elegant example of Victorian engineering: the river is crossed by nine 17-metre (56 ft) wide arches which support a deck at least 33 m (108 ft) above the river but, as it carried a single rail track, only 3.5 m (11 ft) wide. The piers to the arches are built of massive rough-faced stones each weighing up to 500 kilograms (1,100 lb), with similar-sized stones in ashlar to the main arch voussoirs. The spandrels and piers to the 6-metre (20 ft) wide approach arches are built of coursed rubble masonry.

One end of the viaduct has been fenced off, after the path was diverted in 2004 to pass further away from Lambley railway station, which is now a private house.

It is a Grade II* listed structure.

Next bridge upstream	River South Tyne	Next bridge downstream
Eals Footbridge; Footbridge	Lambley Viaduct; Grid reference NY675584	Lambley Footbridge; Footbridge
