= Rampghill mine =

Lead mine in Cumbria, England

Coordinates: 54°47′8″N 2°20′20″W

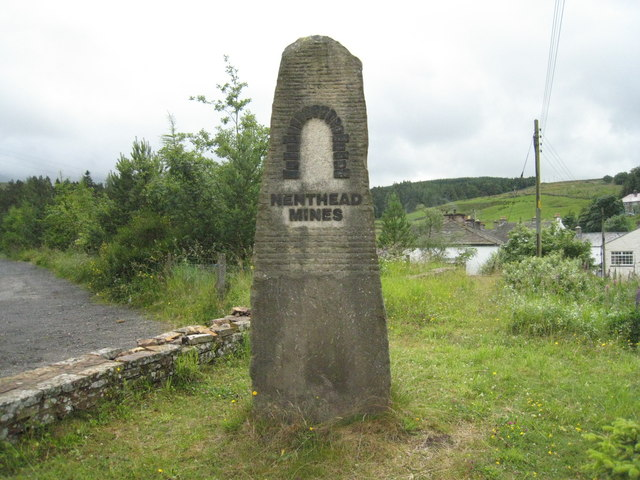
Stone signage for Nenthead mines

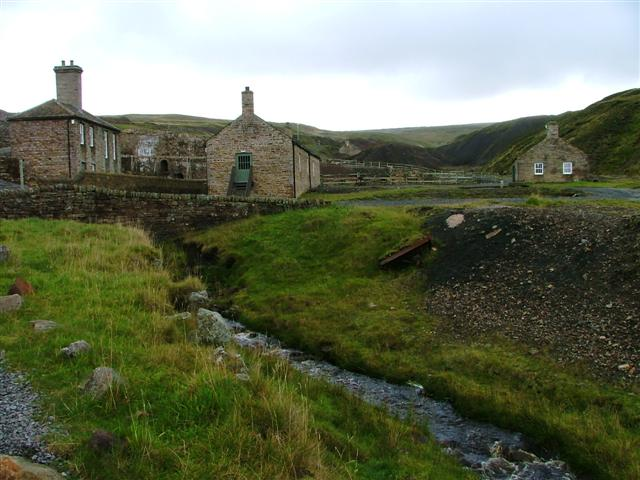
Nenthead mines heritage centre

Rampgill mine is a disused lead mine at Nenthead, Alston Moor, Cumbria, England UK Grid Reference: NY78184351

It was one of the most extensive and productive mines in Nenthead. It can be accessed via the portal of the horse level close to the Heritage Centre car park.

The mine was completely closed for many decades due to collapses in the horse level, but in 2006 some work was done and it became possible to access the Bounder End Cross Vein (also known as the Boundary Cross Vein).

In 2013 the Canadian mining company Minco (www.mincoplc.com) sunk boreholes to discover the extent of zinc deposits beneath Nenthead. Test drilling could go on for several years, but the company believes that the village may be sited on huge deposits. The zinc is 150 metres below the surface, which is too deep to reach by old mining techniques.

The workings of the original lead mine were mainly in the so-called Great Limestone, which was laid down in the Namurian and is generally 10 to 20 metres thick. The lead sulphide mineral galena PbS was mined as an ore of lead, and the sulphides pyrite FeS_{2} and sphalerite ZnS were also present. Many carbonates occur there, including ankerite Ca(Fe,Mg)(CO_{3})_{2}, barytocalcite BaCa(CO_{3})_{2}, calcite CaCO_{3}, siderite FeCO_{3}, smithsonite ZnCO_{3} and witherite BaCO_{3}, as well as the non-carbonate minerals fluorite CaF_{2} and baryte BaSO_{4}.

== Alterations ==
These minerals can react together to alter from one species to another, depending on the prevailing local environment, such as temperature, pressure and acidity. This is demonstrated by the prevalence of pseudomorphs and epimorphs in specimens from this mine. Epimorphs of quartz SiO_{2} after fluorite CaF_{2} are characteristic. These occur when quartz crystals grow on the surface of fluorite crystals, then the fluorite dissolves, leaving a cubic cast in the quartz. The cast could in theory be that of any isometric mineral but in 2005 a cube of fluorite was found re-growing in the corner of a cast. This crystal was in perfect alignment with the cast, indicating that both came from the same source, and the original mineral forming the cast was, indeed, fluorite.

== Baryte and witherite ==
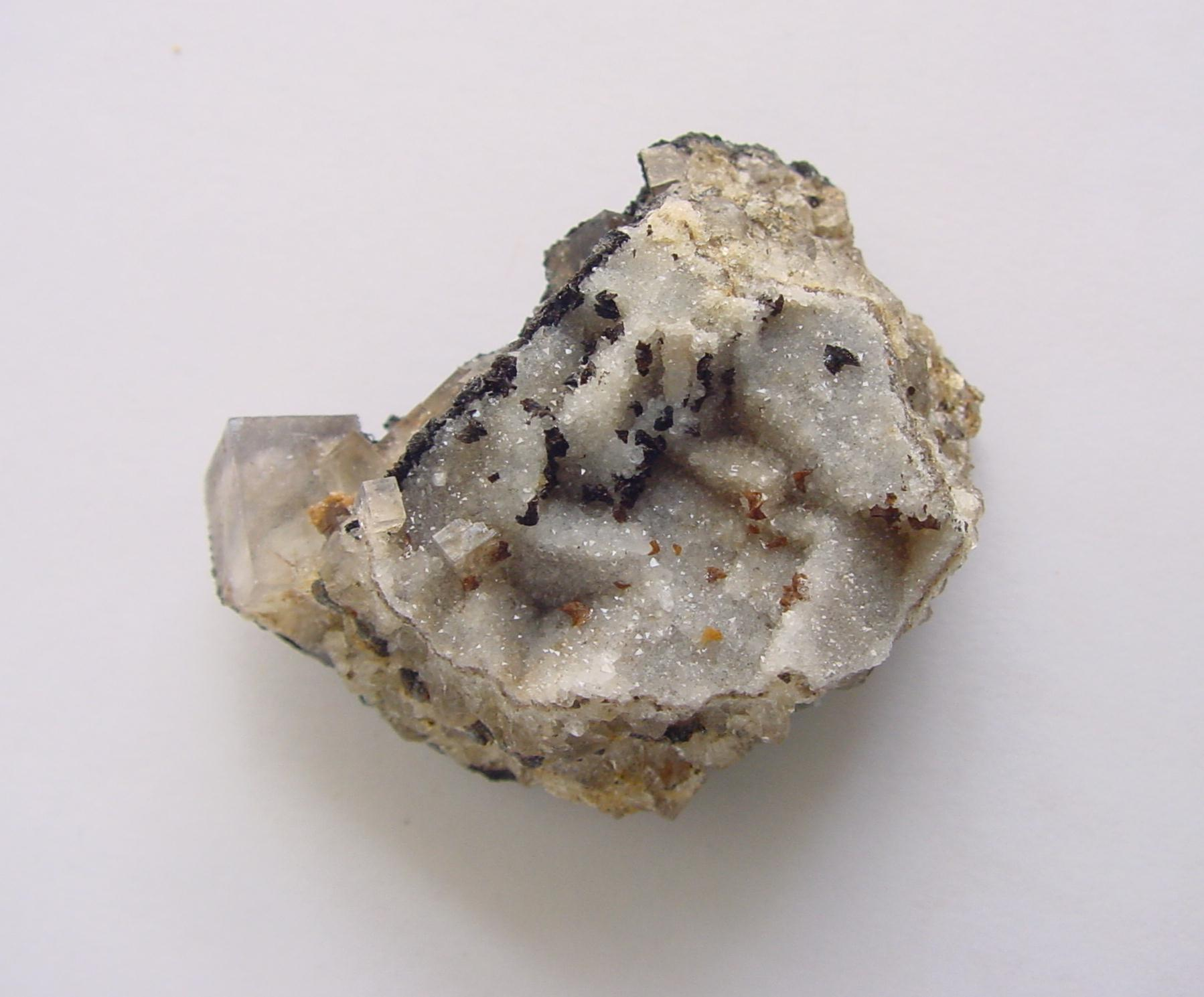
Fluorite together with quartz epimorphs after fluorite from the Rampgill Mine, specimen size 4 cm

Baryte, BaSO_{4}, is an extremely stable mineral. Under surface and near surface conditions it is far less soluble in aqueous solutions than are the barium carbonate minerals witherite BaCO_{3}, barytocalcite BaCa(CO_{3})_{2} and alstonite BaCa(CO_{3})_{2}, so baryte replaces the more soluble minerals. This is demonstrated by the numerous pseudomorphs and partial pseudomorphs of baryte after these carbonates. The sharp pointed crystals of baryte that occur, particularly where witherite is also present, are secondary in nature, forming from witherite. The change from witherite to baryte, however, can also go the other way, with barium carbonates, particularly witherite, replacing baryte. Replacement of baryte by both barytocalcite and witherite has occurred on a significant scale at Rampgill mine.

== Paragenesis ==
Initially cavities formed in the rocks, and some of these were then lined with quartz and sphalerite crystals followed by fluorite. Galena also formed at this time, and later on the barium and carbonate minerals formed. Baryte was the first barium mineral to form, as a primary mineral in slabs up to 10 cm across of irregularly layered crystalline material. Secondary baryte occurred later, typically as encrustations of minute diamond-shaped crystals on earlier minerals. Both barytocalcite and witherite have been found crystallised directly on fluorite and galena, showing that fluorite and galena preceded them in the sequence of deposition. In several fluorite specimens with a coating of barytocalcite, the barytocalcite alters to baryte, which in its turn alters to witherite.

== Minerals at Rampgill ==
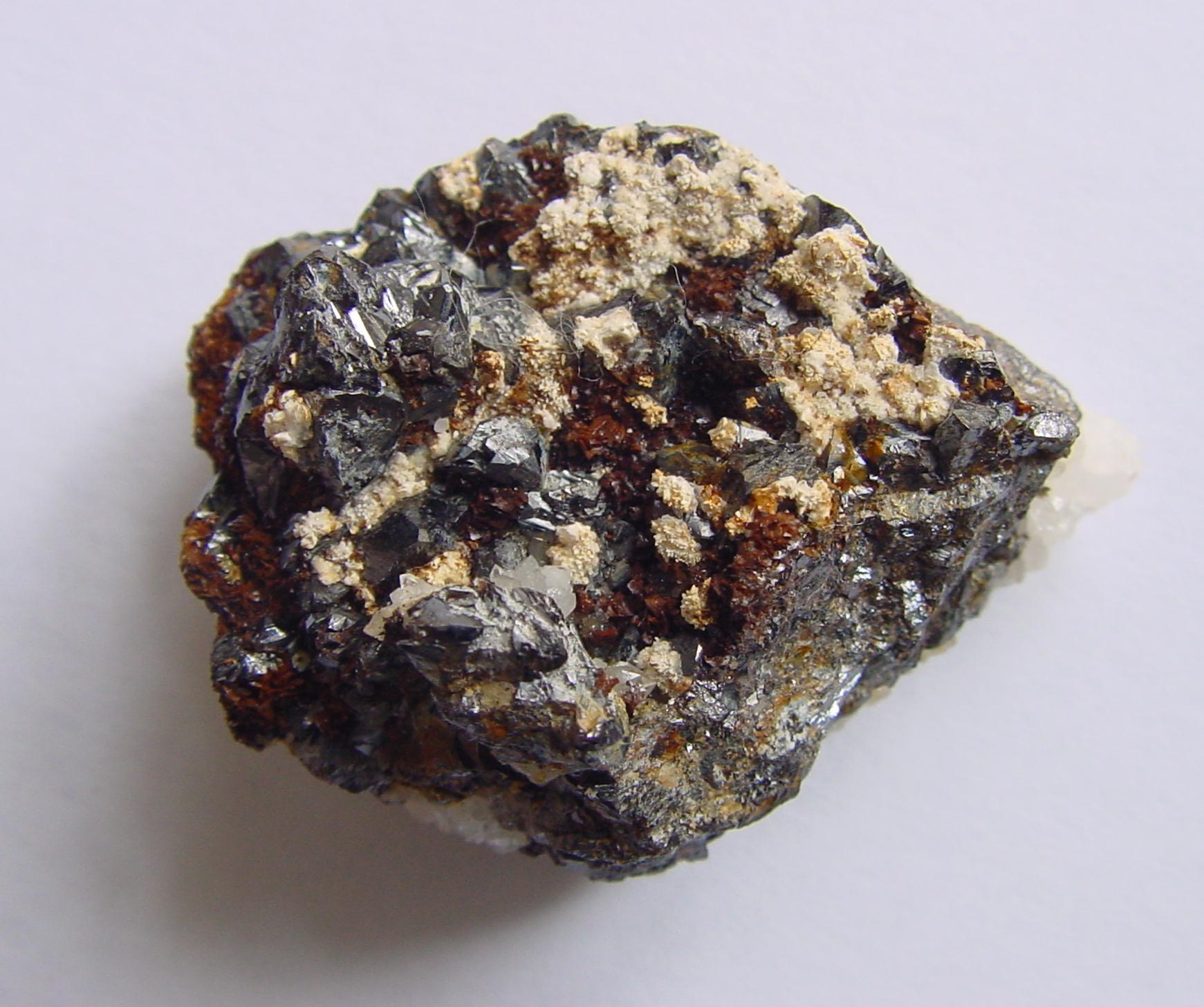
Sphalerite with selenite and ankerite from the Rampgill Mine, specimen size 3.8 cm

- Ankerite Ca(Fe,Mg)(CO_{3})_{2}: Ankerite occurs as brownish rhombohedral crystals on quartz.
- Aragonite CaCO_{3}: There is a photo of aragonite on Mindat, but it does not feature in the list of minerals from Rampgill.
- Baryte BaSO_{4}: Baryte occurs both as a primary and as a secondary mineral, and as pseudomorphs and epimorphs after witherite, barytocalcite and alstonite.
- Barytocalcite BaCa(CO_{3})_{2}: Barytocalcite occurs as masses of buff coloured granular crystalline material, with crusts of small euhedral to anhedral crystals in cavities.
- Calcite CaCO_{3}: Calcite is present as masses and granular crusts as well as skeletal frameworks epimorphous after baryte. Crusts of minute scalenohedral crystals often associated with minute baryte crystals are common on other minerals, and the outside of much of the witherite and some barytocalcite shows signs of corrosion and an encrustation of calcite crystals.
- Chalcopyrite CuFeS_{2}: Chalcopyrite is present as small irregular crystals occurring in all of the barium minerals found here.
- Fluorite CaF_{2}: Fluorite is apparent both as pale yellow cubes, sometimes covered with minute dark siderite crystals and as epimorphs of quartz after fluorite. Fluorite from Rampgill fluoresces purple under long wave UV light.
- Galena PbS: Galena occurs as dull grey cubes with sphalerite and fluorite.
- Gypsum variety Selenite CaSO_{4}·2H_{2}: Selenite occurs as white clusters associated with sphalerite and ankerite.
- Hydrozincite Zn_{5}(CO_{3})_{2}(OH)_{6}: Hydrozincite occurs with sphalerite.
- Pyrite FeS_{2}
- Quartz SiO_{2}: Epimorphs of quartz after fluorite are common, often with regrowths of fluorite, siderite and sphalerite.
- Siderite FeCO_{3}
- Smithsonite ZnCO_{3}
- Sphalerite ZnS: Sphalerite occurs as black crystals with quartz and ankerite.
- Native sulfur S
- Witherite BaCO_{3}: Witherite is an abundant barium mineral at Rampgill. Mostly massive and colourless to brown. Barrel-shaped masses up to 15 cm across of radiating witherite, often with a rudimentary hexagonal cross-section, have been found in cavities in the rock.
  Witherite from Rampgill fluoresces white and calcite fluoresces red under SW ultraviolet light. Both phosphoresce.
