= Boron group =

Related chemical elements of the periodic table

Boron group (group 13)
Hydrogen																															Helium
Lithium	Beryllium																									Boron	Carbon	Nitrogen	Oxygen	Fluorine	Neon
Sodium	Magnesium																									Aluminium	Silicon	Phosphorus	Sulfur	Chlorine	Argon
Potassium	Calcium															Scandium	Titanium	Vanadium	Chromium	Manganese	Iron	Cobalt	Nickel	Copper	Zinc	Gallium	Germanium	Arsenic	Selenium	Bromine	Krypton
Rubidium	Strontium															Yttrium	Zirconium	Niobium	Molybdenum	Technetium	Ruthenium	Rhodium	Palladium	Silver	Cadmium	Indium	Tin	Antimony	Tellurium	Iodine	Xenon
Caesium	Barium	Lanthanum	Cerium	Praseodymium	Neodymium	Promethium	Samarium	Europium	Gadolinium	Terbium	Dysprosium	Holmium	Erbium	Thulium	Ytterbium	Lutetium	Hafnium	Tantalum	Tungsten	Rhenium	Osmium	Iridium	Platinum	Gold	Mercury (element)	Thallium	Lead	Bismuth	Polonium	Astatine	Radon
Francium	Radium	Actinium	Thorium	Protactinium	Uranium	Neptunium	Plutonium	Americium	Curium	Berkelium	Californium	Einsteinium	Fermium	Mendelevium	Nobelium	Lawrencium	Rutherfordium	Dubnium	Seaborgium	Bohrium	Hassium	Meitnerium	Darmstadtium	Roentgenium	Copernicium	Nihonium	Flerovium	Moscovium	Livermorium	Tennessine	Oganesson
group 12 ← → carbon group
IUPAC group number	13
Name by element	boron group
Trivial name	triels
CAS group number (US, pattern A-B-A)	IIIA
old IUPAC number (Europe, pattern A-B)	IIIB

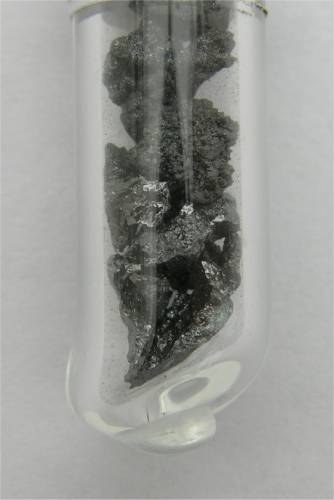
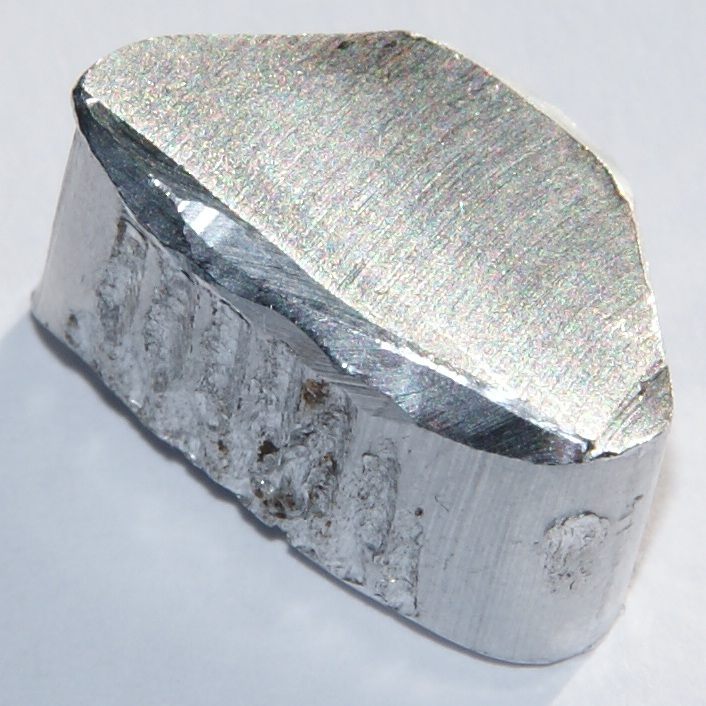
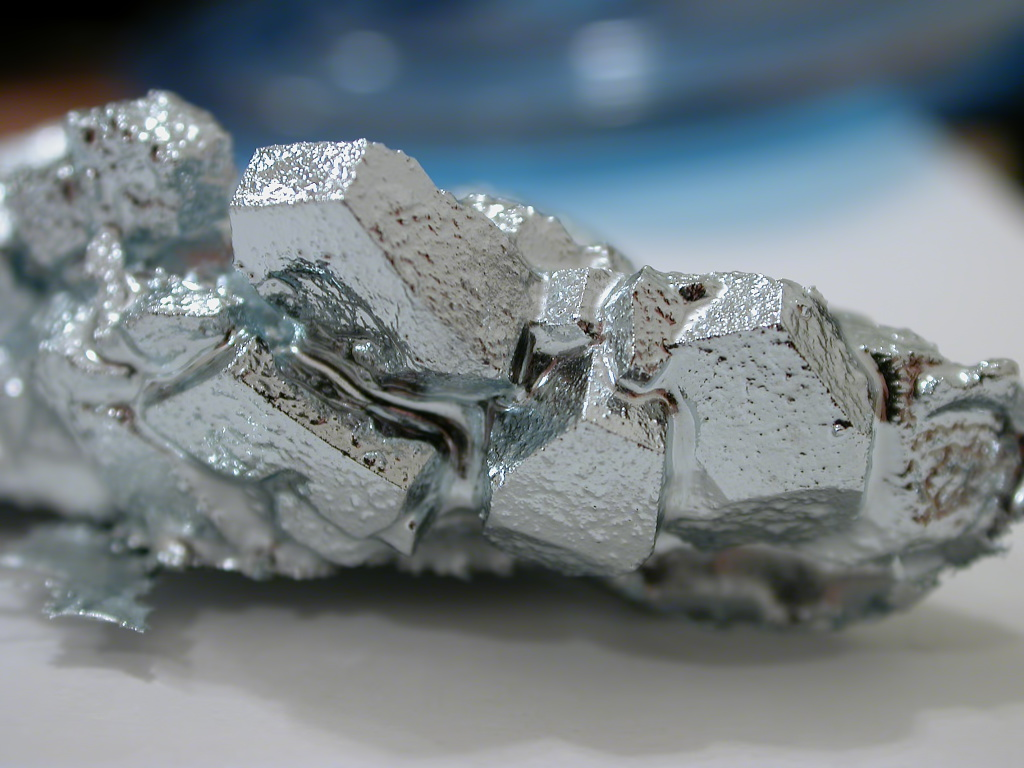
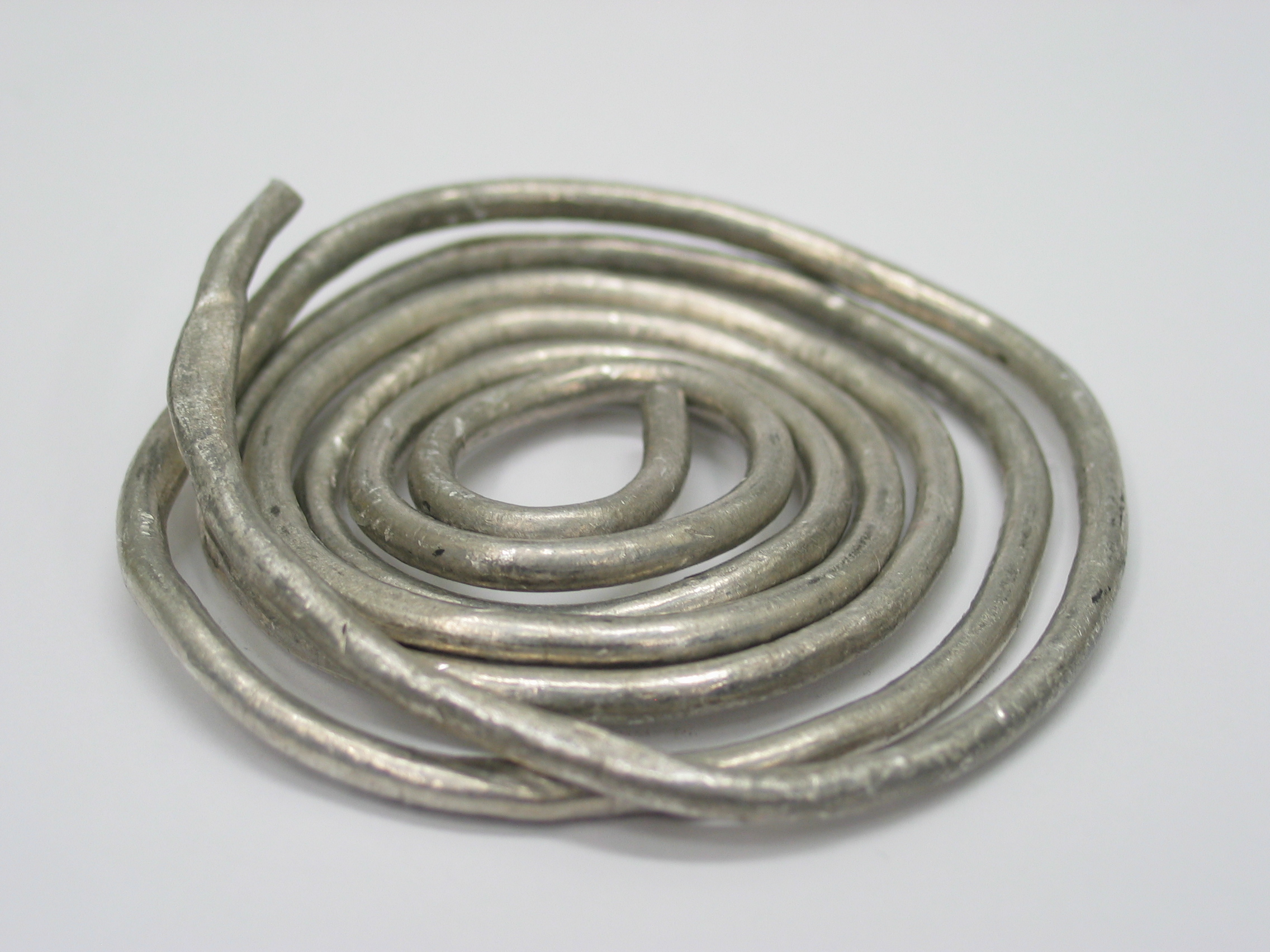
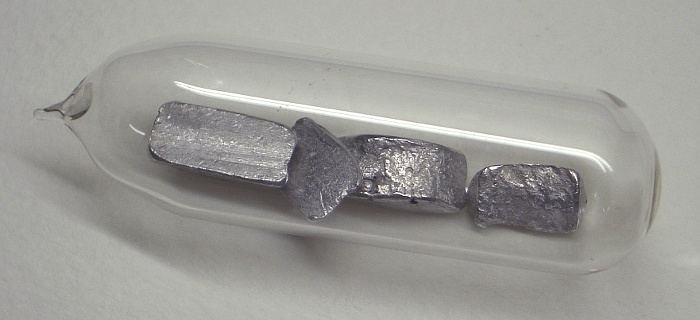
↓ Period
2	Boron (B); 5 Metalloid
3	Aluminium (Al); 13 Other metal
4	Gallium (Ga); 31 Other metal
5	Indium (In); 49 Other metal
6	Thallium (Tl); 81 Other metal
7	Nihonium (Nh); 113 other metal
Legend primordial element synthetic element

The boron group are the chemical elements in group 13 of the periodic table, consisting of boron (B), aluminium (Al), gallium (Ga), indium (In), thallium (Tl) and nihonium (Nh). This group lies in the p-block of the periodic table. The elements in the boron group are characterized by having three valence electrons. These elements have also been referred to as the triels. (Note: The name icosagens for group 13 has occasionally been used, in reference to the icosahedral structures characteristically formed by its elements.)

Several group 13 elements have biological roles in the ecosystem. Boron is a trace element in humans and is essential for some plants. Lack of boron can lead to stunted plant growth, while an excess can also cause harm by inhibiting growth. Aluminium has neither a biological role nor significant toxicity and is considered safe. Indium and gallium can stimulate metabolism; gallium is credited with the ability to bind itself to iron proteins. Thallium is highly toxic, interfering with the function of numerous vital enzymes, and has seen use as a pesticide.

== Characteristics ==
Like other groups, the members of this family show patterns in electron configuration, especially in the outermost shells, resulting in trends in chemical behavior:

Z	Element	Electrons per shell
5	boron	2, 3
13	aluminium	2, 8, 3
31	gallium	2, 8, 18, 3
49	indium	2, 8, 18, 18, 3
81	thallium	2, 8, 18, 32, 18, 3
113	nihonium	2, 8, 18, 32, 32, 18, 3 (predicted)

The boron group is notable for trends in the electron configuration, as shown above, and in some of its elements' characteristics. An example of a trend in reactivity is boron's tendency to form reactive compounds with hydrogen. However, boron differs from the other group members. It has the second highest hardness of all the elements, only exceeded by diamond. Boron is considered a semi-metal while the others in the group are metals. Boron's melting point at 2076 °C is much higher than the second highest in the group, aluminium, at 660 °C.

=== Chemical reactivity ===
==== Hydrides ====
Most of the elements in the boron group show increasing reactivity as the elements get heavier in atomic mass and higher in atomic number. Boron, the first element in the group, is generally unreactive with many elements except at high temperatures, although it is capable of forming many compounds with hydrogen, sometimes called boranes. The simplest borane is diborane, or B_{2}H_{6}. Another example is B_{10}H_{14}.

The next group-13 elements, aluminium and gallium, form fewer stable hydrides, although both AlH_{3} and GaH_{3} exist. Indium, the next element in the group, is not known to form many hydrides, except in complex compounds such as the phosphine complex H_{3}InP(Cy)_{3} (Cy=cyclohexyl). No stable compound of thallium and hydrogen has been synthesized in any laboratory.

Some common chemical compounds of the boron group
Element	Oxides	Hydrides	Fluorides	Chlorides	Sulfides
Boron	(β/g/α)B_{2}O_{3}	B_{2}H_{6}	BF_{3}	BCl_{3}	B_{2}S_{3}
Boron	B_{2}O	B_{10}H_{14}	BF^{−}_{4}		
Boron	B_{6}O	BH_{3}	B_{2}F_{4}		
Boron		B_{5}H_{9}	BF		
Boron		B_{6}H_{12}			
Boron		B_{4}H_{10}			
Boron		B_{6}H^{2−}_{6}			
Boron		B_{12}H^{2−}_{12}			
Boron		B_{20}H_{26}			
Aluminium	(γ/δ/η/θ/χ)Al_{2}O_{3}	(α/α`/β/δ/ε/θ/γ) AlH_{3}	AlF_{3}	AlCl_{3}	(α/β/γ) Al_{2}S_{3}
Aluminium	Al_{2}O	Al_{2}H_{6}			
Aluminium	AlO	AlH_{4}			
Aluminium		AlH^{−}_{4}			
Gallium	(α/β/δ/γ/ε) Ga_{2}O_{3}	Ga_{2}H_{6}	GaF_{3}	GaCl_{3}	GaS
Gallium		GaH_{4}		GaCl_{2}	
Gallium		GaH_{3}		Ga_{2}Cl_{4}	
Gallium				Ga_{2}Cl_{6}	
Gallium				GaCl^{−}_{4}	
Gallium				Ga_{2}Cl^{−}_{7}	
Indium	In_{2}O_{3}	InH_{3}	InF_{3}	InCl_{3}	(α/β/γ) In_{2}S_{3}
Indium	In_{2}O				
Thallium	Tl_{2}O_{3}	TlH_{3}	TlF	TlCl	
Thallium	Tl_{2}O	TlH	TlF_{3}	TlCl_{3}	
Thallium	TlO_{2}		TlF^{3−}_{4}	TlCl_{2}	
Thallium	Tl_{4}O_{3}		TlF^{2−}_{3}	Tl_{2}Cl_{3}	
Nihonium	(Nh_{2}O) (Note: To this date, no nihonium compounds have been synthesized (except possibly NhOH), and all other proposed compounds are entirely theoretical.)	(NhH)	(NhF)	(NhCl)	NhOH
Nihonium	(Nh_{2}O_{3})	(NhH_{3})	(NhF_{3})	(NhCl_{3})	
Nihonium			(NhF^{−}_{6})		

==== Oxides ====
All of the boron-group elements are known to form a trivalent oxide, with two atoms of the element bonded covalently with three atoms of oxygen. These elements show a trend of increasing pH (from acidic to basic). Boron oxide (B_{2}O_{3}) is slightly acidic, aluminium and gallium oxide (Al_{2}O_{3} and Ga_{2}O_{3} respectively) are amphoteric, indium(III) oxide (In_{2}O_{3}) is nearly amphoteric, and thallium(III) oxide (Tl_{2}O_{3}) is a Lewis base because it dissolves in acids to form salts. Each of these compounds are stable, but thallium oxide decomposes at temperatures higher than 875 °C.

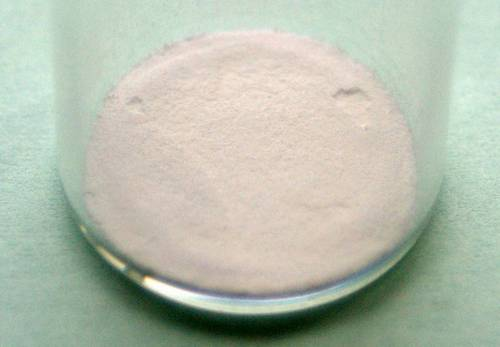
A powdered sample of boron trioxide (B_{2}O_{3}), one of the oxides of boron

==== Halides ====
The elements in group 13 are also capable of forming stable compounds with the halogens, usually with the formula MX_{3} (where M is a boron-group element and X is a halogen.) Fluorine, the first halogen, is able to form stable compounds with every element that has been tested (except neon and helium), and the boron group is no exception. It is even hypothesized that nihonium could form a compound with fluorine, NhF_{3}, before spontaneously decaying due to nihonium's radioactivity. Chlorine also forms stable compounds with all of the elements in the boron group, including thallium, and is hypothesized to react with nihonium. All of the elements will react with bromine under the right conditions, as with the other halogens but less vigorously than either chlorine or fluorine. Iodine will react with all natural elements in the periodic table except for the noble gases, and is notable for its explosive reaction with aluminium to form AlI_{3}. Astatine, the fifth halogen, has only formed a few compounds, due to its radioactivity and short half-life, and no reports of a compound with an At–Al, –Ga, –In, –Tl, or –Nh bond have been seen, although scientists think that it should form salts with metals. Tennessine, the sixth and final member of group 17, may also form compounds with the elements in the boron group; however, because Tennessine is purely synthetic and thus must be created artificially, its chemistry has not been investigated, and any compounds would likely decay nearly instantly after formation due to its extreme radioactivity.

=== Physical properties ===
It has been noticed that the elements in the boron group have similar physical properties, although most of boron's are exceptional. For example, all of the elements in the boron group, except for boron itself, are soft. Moreover, all of the other elements in group 13 are relatively reactive at moderate temperatures, while boron's reactivity only becomes comparable at very high temperatures. One characteristic that all do have in common is having three electrons in their valence shells. Boron, being a metalloid, is a thermal and electrical insulator at room temperature, but a good conductor of heat and electricity at high temperatures. Unlike boron, the metals in the group are good conductors under normal conditions. This is in accordance with the long-standing generalization that all metals conduct heat and electricity better than most non-metals.

=== Oxidation states ===
The inert s-pair effect is significant in the group-13 elements, especially the heavier ones like thallium. This results in a variety of oxidation states. In the lighter elements, the +3 state is the most stable, but the +1 state becomes more prevalent with increasing atomic number, and is the most stable for thallium. Boron is capable of forming compounds with lower oxidization states, of +1 or +2, and aluminium can do the same. Gallium can form compounds with the oxidation states +1, +2 and +3. Indium is like gallium, but its +1 compounds are more stable than those of the lighter elements. The strength of the inert-pair effect is maximal in thallium, which is generally only stable in the oxidation state of +1, although the +3 state is seen in some compounds. Stable and monomeric gallium, indium and thallium radicals with a formal oxidation state of +2 have since been reported. Nihonium may have +5 oxidation state.

=== Periodic trends ===
There are several trends that can be observed in the properties of the boron group members. The boiling points of these elements drop from period to period, while densities tend to rise.

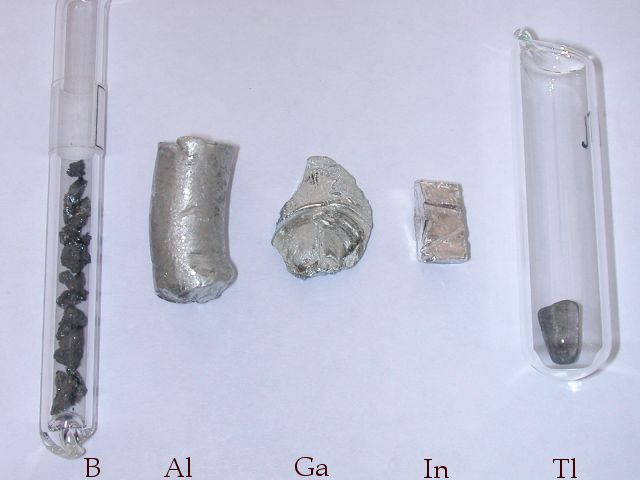
The 5 stable elements of the boron group

Element	Boiling point	Density (g/cm^{3})
Boron	3,927 °C	2.46
Aluminium	2,519 °C	2.7
Gallium	2,204 °C	5.904
Indium	2,072 °C	7.31
Thallium	1,473 °C	11.85

=== Nuclear ===
With the exception of the synthetic nihonium, all of the elements of the boron group have stable isotopes. Because all their atomic numbers are odd, boron, gallium and thallium have only two stable isotopes, while aluminium and indium are monoisotopic, having only one, although most indium found in nature is the weakly radioactive ^{115}In. ^{10}B and ^{11}B are both stable, as are ^{27}Al, ^{69}Ga and ^{71}Ga, ^{113}In, and ^{203}Tl and ^{205}Tl. All of these isotopes are readily found in macroscopic quantities in nature. In theory, though, all isotopes with an atomic number greater than 66 are supposed to be unstable to alpha decay. Conversely, all elements with atomic numbers are less than or equal to 66 (except Tc, Pm, Sm and Eu) have at least one isotope that is theoretically energetically stable to all forms of decay (with the exception of proton decay, which has never been observed, and spontaneous fission, which is theoretically possible for elements with atomic numbers greater than 40).

Like all other elements, the elements of the boron group have radioactive isotopes, either found in trace quantities in nature or produced synthetically. The longest-lived of these unstable isotopes is the indium isotope ^{115}In, with its extremely long half-life of 4.41 × 10^{14} y. This isotope makes up the vast majority of all naturally occurring indium despite its slight radioactivity. The shortest-lived is ^{7}B, with a half-life of a mere 350±50 × 10^{−24} s, being the boron isotope with the fewest neutrons and a half-life long enough to measure. Some radioisotopes have important roles in scientific research; a few are used in the production of goods for commercial use or, more rarely, as a component of finished products.

== History ==
The boron group has had many names over the years. According to former conventions it was Group IIIB in the European naming system and Group IIIA in the American. The group has also gained two collective names, "earth metals" and "triels". The latter name is derived from the Latin prefix tri- ("three") and refers to the three valence electrons that all of these elements, without exception, have in their valence shells. The name "triels" was first suggested by International Union of Pure and Applied Chemistry (IUPAC) in 1970.

Boron was known to the ancient Egyptians, but only in the mineral borax. The metalloid element was not known in its pure form until 1808, when Humphry Davy was able to extract it by the method of electrolysis. Davy devised an experiment in which he dissolved a boron-containing compound in water and sent an electric current through it, causing the elements of the compound to separate into their pure states. To produce larger quantities he shifted from electrolysis to reduction with sodium. Davy named the element boracium. At the same time two French chemists, Joseph Louis Gay-Lussac and Louis Jacques Thénard, used iron to reduce boric acid. The boron they produced was oxidized to boron oxide.

Aluminium, like boron, was first known in minerals before it was finally extracted from alum, a common mineral in some areas of the world. Antoine Lavoisier and Humphry Davy had each separately tried to extract it. Although neither succeeded, Davy had given the metal its current name. It was only in 1825 that the Danish scientist Hans Christian Ørsted successfully prepared a rather impure form of the element. Many improvements followed, a significant advance being made just two years later by Friedrich Wöhler, whose slightly modified procedure still yielded an impure product. The first pure sample of aluminium is credited to Henri Etienne Sainte-Claire Deville, who substituted sodium for potassium in the procedure. At that time aluminium was considered precious, and it was displayed next to such metals as gold and silver. The method used today, electrolysis of aluminium oxide dissolved in cryolite, was developed by Charles Martin Hall and Paul Héroult in the late 1880s.

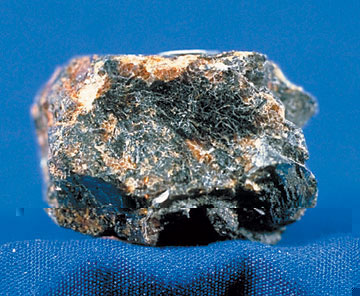
The mineral zinc blende, more commonly known as sphalerite, in which indium can occur.

Thallium, the heaviest stable element in the boron group, was discovered by William Crookes and Claude-Auguste Lamy in 1861. Unlike gallium and indium, thallium had not been predicted by Dmitri Mendeleev, having been discovered before Mendeleev invented the periodic table. As a result, no one was really looking for it until the 1850s when Crookes and Lamy were examining residues from sulfuric acid production. In the spectra they saw a completely new line, a streak of deep green, which Crookes named after the Greek word θαλλός (thallos), referring to a green shoot or twig. Lamy was able to produce larger amounts of the new metal and determined most of its chemical and physical properties.

Indium is the fourth element of the boron group but was discovered before the third, gallium, and after the fifth, thallium. In 1863 Ferdinand Reich and his assistant, Hieronymous Theodor Richter, were looking in a sample of the mineral zinc blende, also known as sphalerite (ZnS), for the spectroscopic lines of the newly discovered element thallium. Reich heated the ore in a coil of platinum metal and observed the lines that appeared in a spectroscope. Instead of the green thallium lines that he expected, he saw a new line of deep indigo-blue. Concluding that it must come from a new element, they named it after the characteristic indigo color it had produced.

Gallium minerals were not known before August 1875, when the element itself was discovered. It was one of the elements that the inventor of the periodic table, Dmitri Mendeleev, had predicted to exist six years earlier. While examining the spectroscopic lines in zinc blende the French chemist Paul Emile Lecoq de Boisbaudran found indications of a new element in the ore. In just three months he was able to produce a sample, which he purified by dissolving it in a potassium hydroxide (KOH) solution and sending an electric current through it. The next month he presented his findings to the French Academy of Sciences, naming the new element after the Greek name for Gaul, modern France.

The last confirmed element in the boron group, nihonium, was not discovered but rather created or synthesized. The element's synthesis was first reported by the Dubna Joint Institute for Nuclear Research team in Russia and the Lawrence Livermore National Laboratory in the United States, though it was the Dubna team who successfully conducted the experiment in August 2003. Nihonium was discovered in the decay chain of moscovium, which produced a few precious atoms of nihonium. The results were published in January of the following year. Since then around 13 atoms have been synthesized and various isotopes characterized. However, their results did not meet the stringent criteria for being counted as a discovery, and it was the later RIKEN experiments of 2004 aimed at directly synthesizing nihonium that were acknowledged by IUPAC as the discovery.

=== Etymology ===
The name "boron" comes from the Arabic word for the mineral borax, (بورق, boraq) which was known before boron was ever extracted. The "-on" suffix is thought to have been taken from "carbon". Aluminium was named by Humphry Davy in the early 1800s. It is derived from the Greek word alumen, meaning bitter salt, or the Latin alum, the mineral. Gallium is derived from the Latin Gallia, referring to France, the place of its discovery. Indium comes from the Latin word indicum, meaning indigo dye, and refers to the element's prominent indigo spectroscopic line. Thallium, like indium, is named after the Greek word for the color of its spectroscopic line: thallos, meaning a green twig or shoot. "Nihonium" is named after Japan (Nihon in Japanese), where it was discovered.

== Occurrence and abundance ==
=== Boron ===
Boron, with its atomic number of 5, is a very light element. Almost never found free in nature, it is very low in abundance, composing only 0.001% (10 ppm) of the Earth's crust. It is known to occur in over a hundred different minerals and ores, however: the main source is borax, but it is also found in colemanite, boracite, kernite, tusionite, berborite and fluoborite. Major world miners and extractors of boron include Turkey, the United States, Argentina, China, Bolivia and Peru. Turkey is by far the most prominent of these, accounting for around 70% of all boron extraction in the world. The United States is second, most of its yield coming from the state of California.

=== Aluminium ===
Aluminium, in contrast to boron, is the most abundant metal in the Earth's crust, and the third most abundant element. It composes about 8.2% (82,000 ppm) of the Earth's crust, surpassed only by oxygen and silicon. It is like boron, however, in that it is uncommon in nature as a free element. This is due to aluminium's tendency to attract oxygen atoms, forming several aluminium oxides. Aluminium is now known to occur in nearly as many minerals as boron, including garnets, turquoises and beryls, but the main source is the ore bauxite. The world's leading countries in the extraction of aluminium are Ghana, Suriname, Russia and Indonesia, followed by Australia, Guinea and Brazil.

=== Gallium ===
Gallium is a relatively rare element in the Earth's crust and is not found in as many minerals as its lighter homologues. Its abundance on the Earth is a mere 0.0018% (18 ppm). Its production is very low compared to other elements, but has increased greatly over the years as extraction methods have improved. Gallium can be found as a trace in a variety of ores, including bauxite and sphalerite, and in such minerals as diaspore and germanite. Trace amounts have been found in coal as well. The gallium content is greater in a few minerals, including gallite (CuGaS_{2}), but these are too rare to be counted as major sources and make negligible contributions to the world's supply.

=== Indium ===
Indium is another rare element in the boron group at only 0.000005% (0.05 ppm),. Very few indium-containing minerals are known, all of them scarce: an example is indite. Indium is found in several zinc ores, but only in minute quantities; likewise some copper and lead ores contain traces. As is the case for most other elements found in ores and minerals, the indium extraction process has become more efficient in recent years, ultimately leading to larger yields. Canada is the world's leader in indium reserves, but both the United States and China have comparable amounts.

=== Thallium ===
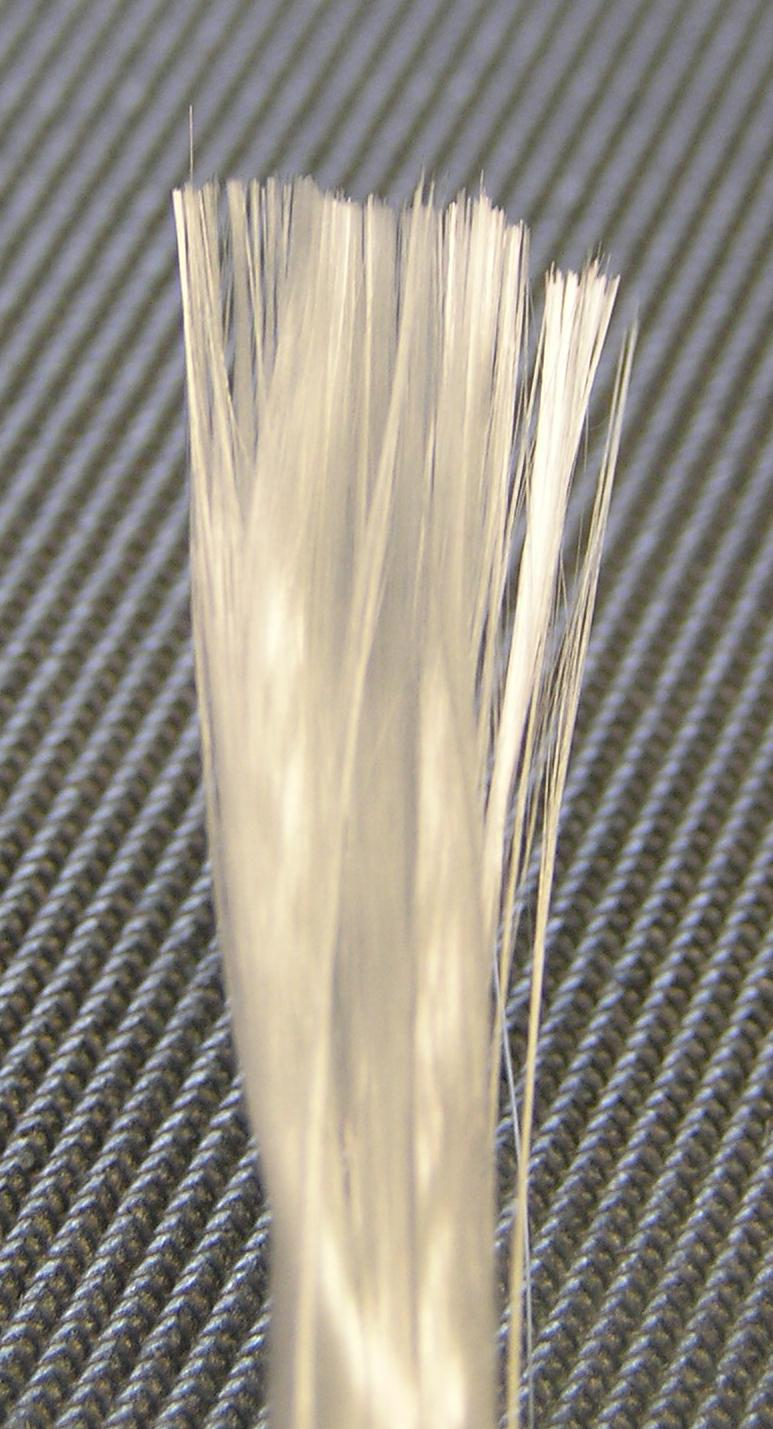
A small bundle of fiberglass

Thallium is of intermediate abundance in the Earth's crust, estimated to be 0.00006% (0.6 ppm). It is found on the ground in some rocks, in the soil and in clay. Many sulfide ores of iron, zinc and cobalt contain thallium. In minerals it is found in moderate quantities: some examples are crookesite (in which it was first discovered), lorandite, routhierite, bukovite, hutchinsonite and sabatierite. There are other minerals that contain small amounts of thallium, but they are very rare and do not serve as primary sources.

=== Nihonium ===
Nihonium is an element that is never found in nature but has been created in a laboratory. It is therefore classified as a synthetic element with no stable isotopes.

== Applications ==
With the exception of synthetic nihonium, all the elements in the boron group have numerous uses and applications in the production and content of many items.

=== Boron ===
Boron has found many industrial applications in recent decades, and new ones are still being found. A common application is in fiberglass. There has been rapid expansion in the market for borosilicate glass; most notable among its special qualities is a much greater resistance to thermal expansion than regular glass. Another commercially expanding use of boron and its derivatives is in ceramics. Several boron compounds, especially the oxides, have unique and valuable properties that have led to their substitution for other materials that are less useful. Boron may be found in pots, vases, plates, and ceramic pan-handles for its insulating properties.

The compound borax is used in bleaches, for both clothes and teeth. The hardness of boron and some of its compounds give it a wide array of additional uses. A small part (5%) of the boron produced finds use in agriculture.

=== Aluminium ===
Aluminium is a metal with numerous familiar uses in everyday life. It is most often encountered in construction materials, in electrical devices, especially as the conductor in cables, and in tools and vessels for cooking and preserving food. Aluminium's lack of reactivity with food products makes it particularly useful for canning. Its high affinity for oxygen makes it a powerful reducing agent. Finely powdered pure aluminium oxidizes rapidly in air, generating a huge amount of heat in the process (burning at about 5500 °F or 3037 °C), leading to applications in welding and elsewhere that a large amount of heat is needed. Aluminium is a component of alloys used for making lightweight bodies for aircraft. Cars also sometimes incorporate aluminium in their framework and body, and there are similar applications in military equipment. Less common uses include components of decorations and some guitars. The element is also sees use in a diverse range of electronics.

=== Gallium ===
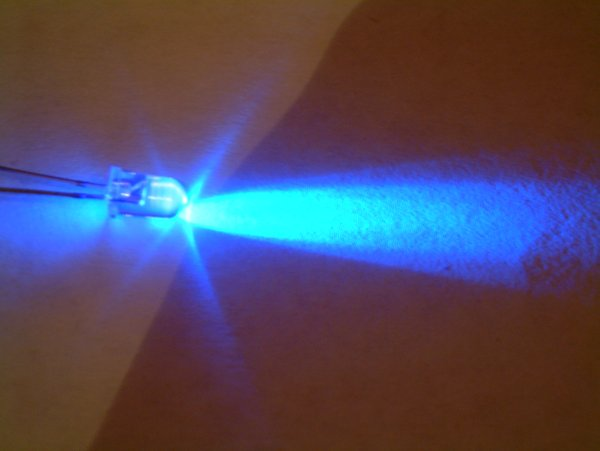
Gallium is one of the chief components of blue LEDs

Gallium and its derivatives have only found applications in recent decades. Gallium arsenide has been used in semiconductors, in amplifiers, in solar cells (for example in satellites) and in tunnel diodes for FM transmitter circuits. Gallium alloys are used mostly for dental purposes. Gallium ammonium chloride is used for the leads in transistors. A major application of gallium is in LED lighting. The pure element has been used as a dopant in semiconductors, and has additional uses in electronic devices with other elements. Gallium has the property of being able to 'wet' glass and porcelain, and thus can be used to make mirrors and other highly reflective objects. Gallium can be added to alloys of other metals to lower their melting points.

=== Indium ===
Indium's uses can be divided into four categories: the largest part (70%) of the production is used for coatings, usually combined as indium tin oxide (ITO); a smaller portion (12%) goes into alloys and solders; a similar amount is used in electrical components and in semiconductors; and the final 6% goes to minor applications. Among the items in which indium may be found are platings, bearings, display devices, heat reflectors, phosphors, and nuclear control rods. Indium tin oxide has found a wide range of applications, including glass coatings, solar panels, streetlights, electrophoretic displays (EPDs), electroluminescent displays (ELDs), plasma display panels (PDPs), electrochemic displays (ECs), field emission displays (FEDs), sodium lamps, windshield glass and cathode-ray tubes, making it the single most important indium compound.

=== Thallium ===
Thallium is used in its elemental form more often than the other boron-group elements. Uncompounded thallium is used in low-melting glasses, photoelectric cells, switches, mercury alloys for low-range glass thermometers, and thallium salts. It can be found in lamps and electronics, and is also used in myocardial imaging. The possibility of using thallium in semiconductors has been researched, and it is a known catalyst in organic synthesis. Thallium hydroxide (TlOH) is used mainly in the production of other thallium compounds. Thallium sulfate (Tl_{2}SO_{4}) is an outstanding vermin-killer, and it is a principal component in some rat and mouse poisons. However, the United States and some European countries have banned the substance because of its high toxicity to humans. In other countries, though, the market for the substance is growing. Tl_{2}SO_{4} is also used in optical systems.

== Biological role ==
None of the group-13 elements has a major biological role in complex animals, but some are at least associated with a living being. As in other groups, the lighter elements usually have more biological roles than the heavier. The heaviest ones are toxic, as are the other elements in the same periods. Boron is essential in most plants, whose cells use it for such purposes as strengthening cell walls. It is found in humans, certainly as an essential trace element, but there is ongoing debate over its significance in human nutrition. Boron's chemistry does allow it to form complexes with such important molecules as carbohydrates, so it is plausible that it could be of greater use in the human body than previously thought. Boron has also been shown to be able to replace iron in some of its functions, particularly in the healing of wounds. Aluminium has no known biological role in plants or animals, despite its widespread occurrence in nature. Gallium is not essential for the human body, but its relation to iron(III) allows it to become bound to proteins that transport and store iron. Gallium can also stimulate metabolism. Indium and its heavier homologues have no biological role, although indium salts in small doses, like gallium, can stimulate metabolism.

== Toxicity ==
Each element of the boron group has a unique toxicity profile to plants and animals.

As an example of boron toxicity, it has been observed to harm barley in concentrations exceeding 20 mM. The symptoms of boron toxicity are numerous in plants, complicating research: they include reduced cell division, decreased shoot and root growth, decreased production of leaf chlorophyll, inhibition of photosynthesis, lowering of stomata conductance, reduced proton extrusion from roots, and deposition of lignin and suberin.

Aluminium does not present a prominent toxicity hazard in small quantities, but very large doses are slightly toxic. Gallium is not considered toxic, although it may have some minor effects. Indium is not toxic and can be handled with nearly the same precautions as gallium, but some of its compounds are slightly to moderately toxic.

Thallium, unlike gallium and indium, is extremely toxic, and has caused many poisoning deaths. Its most noticeable effect, apparent even from tiny doses, is hair loss all over the body, but it causes a wide range of other symptoms, disrupting and eventually halting the functions of many organs. The nearly colorless, odorless and tasteless nature of thallium compounds has led to their use by murderers. The incidence of thallium poisoning, intentional and accidental, increased when thallium (with its similarly toxic compound, thallium sulfate) was introduced to control rats and other pests. The use of thallium pesticides has therefore been prohibited since 1975 in many countries, including the USA.

Nihonium is a highly unstable element and decays by emitting alpha particles. Due to its strong radioactivity, it would definitely be extremely toxic, although significant quantities of nihonium (larger than a few atoms) have not yet been assembled.
