= Barytocalcite =

Anhydrous barium calcium carbonate mineral

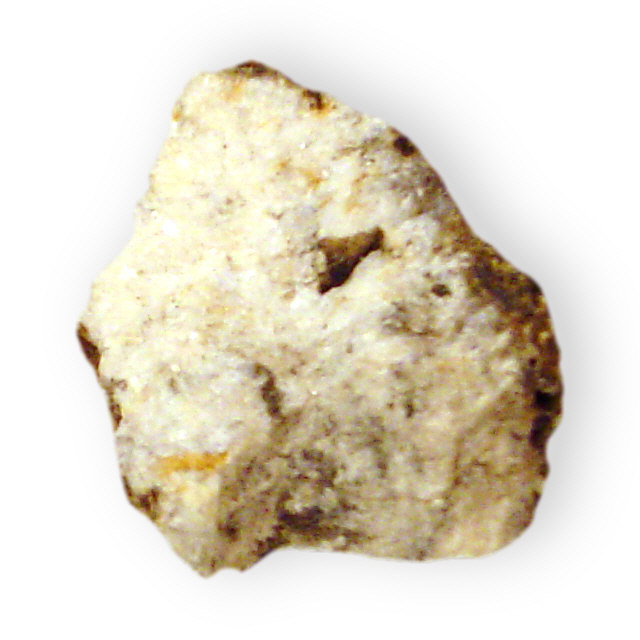
- Barytocalcite from England

General
- Category: Carbonate mineral
- Formula: BaCa(CO_{3})_{2}
- IMA symbol: Bcal
- Strunz classification: 5.AB.45
- Dana classification: 14.02.06.01
- Crystal system: Monoclinic
- Crystal class: Prismatic (2/m) (same H-M symbol)
- Space group: P2_{1}/m
- Unit cell: a = 8.1 Å, b = 5.2 Å, c = 6.5 Å, β = 106°; Z = 2

Identification
- Formula mass: 297.42 g/mol
- Colour: Colourless, white, greyish, greenish, yellowish
- Crystal habit: Prismatic, drusy, massive – granular
- Cleavage: Perfect in at least two directions
- Tenacity: Brittle
- Mohs scale hardness: 4
- Luster: Vitreous to resinous
- Streak: White
- Diaphaneity: Translucent to transparent
- Specific gravity: 3.64 to 3.71
- Optical properties: Biaxial (−)
- Refractive index: n_{α} = 1.525, n_{β} = 1.684, n_{γ} = 1.686
- Birefringence: δ = 0.161
- 2V angle: Measured: 15°, calculated: 10°
- Dispersion: Relatively weak, r>v
- Ultraviolet fluorescence: Fluorescent dull yellow under LW and SW UV
- Solubility: Soluble in dilute HCl

Barytocalcite is an anhydrous barium calcium carbonate mineral with the chemical formula BaCa(CO_{3})_{2}. It is trimorphous with alstonite and paralstonite, that is to say the three minerals have the same formula but different structures. Baryte and quartz pseudomorphs after barytocalcite have been observed.

Barytocalcite crystallizes in the monoclinic crystal system, typically as massive to druzy accumulations of transparent white to yellow to grey aggregates of slender prismatic crystals. It has a Mohs hardness of 4 and a specific gravity of 3.64 to 3.71.

It was first described in 1824 for an occurrence in the Blagill Mine in North Pennines, Cumbria (Cumberland), England, and named for its composition.

== Structure ==
The mineral crystallises in the monoclinic crystal system. Most sources put it in the prismatic class 2/m, with space group P2_{1}/m, but Webmin puts it in the sphenoidal class 2 with space group P2_{1}. The structure is similar to that of dolomite, but with two crystallographically different CO_{3} groups. The cation layers are stacked in an ABCABC... stacking pattern, repeating every 3 layers. The Ca ion is coordinated to 7 oxygens.

== Unit cell ==
All sources give unit cell parameters whose values rounded down are a = 8.1 Å, b = 5.2 Å, c = 6.5 Å and β = 106°, with two formula units per unit cell (Z = 2). The primary source has a = 8.092 Å, b = 5.2344 Å, c = 6.544 Å, β = 106.05° and Z=2.

== Appearance ==
Barytocalcite often forms oriented growths on baryte, and calcite, witherite and baryte can be epitaxial on barytocalcite. Crystals are normally short to long prismatic and striated. They are transparent to translucent, colourless, white, greyish, greenish or yellowish with a white streak and a vitreous to resinous lustre.

== Optical properties ==
Barytocalcite is a biaxial (-) mineral with refractive indices n_{α} = 1.525, n_{β} = 1.684 and n_{γ} = 1.686. The maximum birefringence (the difference in refractive index between light travelling through the crystal with different polarizations) is δ = 0.161. The optic angle 2V is the angle between the two optic axes in a biaxial crystal. The measured values of 2V for this mineral is 15°. It is also possible to calculate a theoretical value of 2V from the measured values of the refractive indices. The calculated value for barytocalcite is 10°. If the colour of the incident light is changed, then the refractive indices are modified, and the value of 2V changes. This is known as dispersion of the optic axes. For barytocalcite the effect is weak, with 2V larger for red light than for violet light (r>v).
The optical directions X, Y and Z are the directions of travel of light with refractive indices n_{α}, n_{β} and n_{γ} respectively. In general they are not the same as the directions a, b and c of the crystallographic axes. For barytocalcite Z is parallel to the b axis, X is at an angle of 64° to the c axis and Y is at an angle of 26° to the c axis.

Sources disagree about fluorescence. Webmin describes the mineral as non-fluorescent, Dana categorises it as weakly fluorescent and Mindat states that it is fluorescent dull yellow under both longwave and shortwave ultraviolet light.

== Physical properties ==
Barytocalcite has at least one perfect and one imperfect cleavage. It is a brittle mineral, and breaks with an uneven to conchoidal fracture. It is quite soft, with a hardness 4, the same as that of fluorite. Calcite CaCO_{3} and dolomite CaMg(CO_{3})_{2} are carbonates where calcium Ca and magnesium Mg replace the barium in the formula for barytocalcite, BaCa(CO_{3})_{2}. These two minerals are even softer than barytocalcite, and much less dense. Barytocalcite has specific gravity 3.7. This is higher than that of calcite (2.7) or dolomite (2.85) because the barium atom is very heavy, with atomic mass 137, which is much more than magnesium at 24 and calcium at 40. Barytocalcite is soluble in dilute hydrochloric acid HCl and it is not radioactive.

== Type locality ==
The type locality is the Blagill Mine, Nent Valley, Alston Moor District, North Pennines, North and Western Region, Cumbria, England. This mine is no longer operative, and it has been designated a site of Site of Special Scientific Interest so collecting is no longer allowed. In the past lustrous, transparent, prismatic crystals of barytocalcite have been found there in veins in limestone, associated with fluorite, calcite and baryte.

=== Other localities ===
- Canada: Brunswick No 12 Mine, near Bathurst, Gloucester County, New Brunswick. Associated with edingtonite
- England: Nentsberry Haggs Mine, Alston Moor, Cumbria. A 21 cm specimen with lustrous honey-coloured crystals of barytocalcite to 2 cm on crystalline witherite was collected here in 1972, and well formed crystals of barytocalcite were found in the 1990s
- England: Fallowfield Mine, near Hexham, Northumberland – minor amounts of barytocalcite have been found here
- Russia: Found in baryte ore of the Tolecheinsli deposit, Krasnoyarsk region, Siberia, Russia
- Sweden: Found with hedyphane and hausmannite at Langban, Varmland, Sweden
- US: Hutter Mine (Herter Magnetite Mine), James River-Roanoke River Mn-Fe-Ba District, Pittsylvania County, Virginia. Barytocalcite occurs here and is probably the source of barium for the formation of the rare mica kinoshitalite
- US: South Ouray, Uintah County, Utah. Barytocalcite occurs in the dolomitic oil shale of the Eocene Green River Formation of South Ouray
