= Benstonite =

Ba,Ca,Mg-mixed carbonate mineral

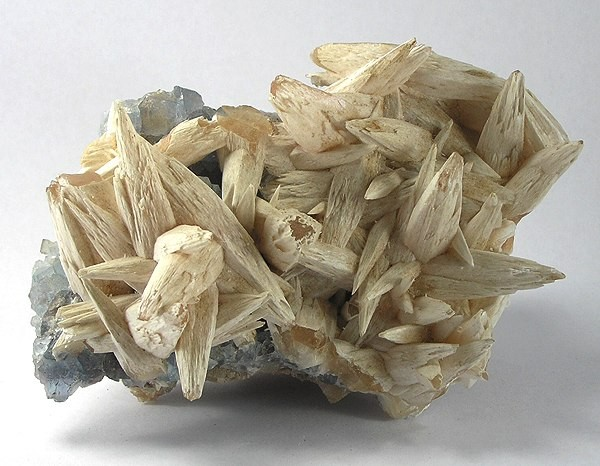
- Benstonite with calcite

General
- Category: Carbonate minerals
- Formula: Ba_{6}Ca_{6}Mg(CO_{3})_{13}
- IMA symbol: Ben
- Strunz classification: 5.AB.55
- Dana classification: 14.2.3.1
- Crystal system: Trigonal
- Crystal class: Rhombohedral (3̅); H-M group: (3̅)
- Space group: R3̅
- Unit cell: a = 18.280 Å, c = 8.652 Å; Z = 3

Identification
- Color: Snow-white, ivory, very pale yellow, pale yellowish brown
- Cleavage: Good on {314̅2}
- Mohs scale hardness: 3–4
- Luster: Vitreous
- Streak: White
- Diaphaneity: Translucent
- Optical properties: Uniaxial (−)
- Refractive index: n_{ω} = 1.690 n_{ε} = 1.527
- Birefringence: δ = 0.163
- Ultraviolet fluorescence: Red or yellow under UV and X-rays

Benstonite is a mineral with formula Ba_{6}Ca_{6}Mg(CO_{3})_{13}. Discovered in 1954, the mineral was described in 1961 and named after Orlando J. Benston (1901–1966).

== Description and occurrence ==
Benstonite is translucent and white, pale yellow, or pale yellow-brown in color. The mineral occurs as cleavable masses; cleavage fragments are nearly perfectly rhombohedral in shape. Cleavage faces are up to 1 cm (0.39 in) across and slightly curved. On large specimens, the faces exhibit a mosaic structure similar to that in some specimens of dolomite and siderite. Benstonite fluoresces red or yellow under x-rays and longwave and shortwave ultraviolet. The mineral also exhibits strong red phosphorescence.

Benstonite is known to occur in Canada, China, India, Italy, Namibia, Russia, Sweden, and the United States. It occurs in association with alstonite, barite, barytocalcite, calcite, daqingshanite, fluorite, huntite, monazite, phlogopite, pyrite, sphalerite, strontianite, and quartz.

== Synthesis ==
The mineral was first synthesized in 1973 during a study of the Ba-Mg-Ca-CO_{3} system in aqueous solution. At room temperature, a solution containing proportional quantities of magnesium chloride, barium chloride, and calcium chloride was prepared, to which sodium carbonate was added. The solution immediately precipitated, and after sitting for two weeks, the precipitate was identified as nearly pure benstonite.

== History ==
Orlando J. Benston of Malvern, Arkansas, visited a barite mine near the Magnet Cove igneous complex on New Year's Eve, 1954. He collected samples of a mineral that he guessed might be alstonite or barytocalcite on the basis of qualitative tests. Friedrich Lippmann identified it as a new mineral and described it in the journal Naturwissenschaften in 1961. He named it Benstonite in honor of Benston.

Type specimens are held at Victor Goldschmidt University in Germany and the National Museum of Natural History in the United States.
