= Alstonite =

Hydrothermal mineral

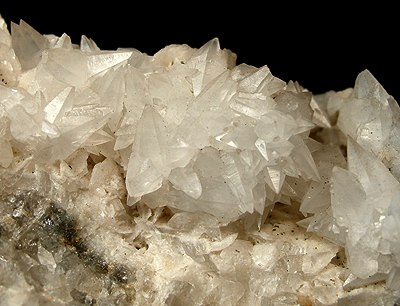

General
- Category: Carbonate mineral
- Formula: BaCa(CO_{3})_{2}
- IMA symbol: Asn
- Strunz classification: 5.AB.35
- Dana classification: 14.02.05.01
- Crystal system: Triclinic; Unknown space group
- Unit cell: a = 17.38, b = 14.40 c = 6.123 [Å]; α = 90.35° β = 90.12°, γ = 120.08°; Z = 24

Identification
- Formula mass: 297.42 g/mol
- Colour: Colourless to snow-white; also pale gray, pale cream, pink to pale rose-red
- Crystal habit: Steep pseudohexagonal dipyramids, pseudo-orthorhombic
- Twinning: Common on pseudo-orthorhombic {11̅0} and {310}
- Cleavage: Imperfect on pseudo-orthorhombic {110}
- Fracture: Uneven
- Mohs scale hardness: 4 to 4.5
- Lustre: Vitreous
- Streak: White
- Diaphaneity: Transparent to translucent
- Specific gravity: 3.70
- Optical properties: Biaxial (−)
- Refractive index: n_{α} = 1.526 n_{β} = 1.671 n_{γ} = 1.672
- Birefringence: δ = 0.146
- Pleochroism: None
- 2V angle: Measured 6°, calculated 8°
- Dispersion: Weak, r > v
- Ultraviolet fluorescence: Weak yellow under LW and SW
- Solubility: Soluble in dilute HCl
- Alters to: Colour may fade on exposure to light
- Other characteristics: Not radioactive

Alstonite, also known as bromlite, is a low temperature hydrothermal mineral that is a rare double carbonate of calcium and barium with the formula BaCa(CO_{3})_{2}, sometimes with some strontium. Barytocalcite and paralstonite have the same formula but different structures, so these three minerals are said to be trimorphous. Alstonite is triclinic but barytocalcite is monoclinic and paralstonite is trigonal. The species was named Bromlite by Thomas Thomson in 1837 after the Bromley-Hill mine, and alstonite by August Breithaupt of the Freiberg Mining Academy in 1841, after Alston, Cumbria, the base of operations of the mineral dealer from whom the first samples were obtained by Thomson in 1834. Both of these names have been in common use.

== Structure ==
Alstonite is triclinic, but appears pseudo-orthorhombic because of twinning. The space group is P1 or P1̅. Alstonite appears to have a superstructure based on paralstonite without long range order of the metal cations or the CO_{3} groups. The structure of paralstonite is similar to that of other double carbonates.

== Unit cell ==
The number of formula units, Z, in the triclinic unit cell is given as 10 or 12, and the unit cell parameters are a = 17.38 Å, b = 14.40 Å, c = 6.123 Å, α = 90.35°, β = 90.12°, γ = 120.08°. The Handbook of Mineralogy, however, describes the mineral in terms of a pseudo-orthorhombic unit cell, with space group C1 or C1̅, Z = 24, and unit cell parameters a = 30.14 Å, b = 17.40 Å, c = 6.12 Å, α = β = γ = 90°.

== Appearance ==
Simple crystals of alstonite are not known. The crystals are invariably complex twins formed by repeated twinning, and have the form of doubly terminated pseudo-hexagonal pyramids, like those of witherite but more acute. The faces are horizontally striated perpendicular to the pseudohexagonal c crystal axis and they are divided vertically by a medial, slightly reentrant twinning line parallel to the pseudohexagonal c axis.

Crystals are colourless to snow white, yellow-gray, pale gray, pale cream, pink, or pale rose-red, but the colour may fade on exposure to light. They are transparent to translucent with a white streak and vitreous lustre. The examination in polarized light of a transverse section shows that each compound crystal is built up of six differently oriented individuals arranged in twelve segments.

== Optical properties ==
Alstonite is a biaxial (−) mineral with refractive indices n_{α} =1.526, n_{β} = 1.671, n_{γ} = 1.672. The maximum birefringence (the difference in refractive index between light travelling through the crystal with different polarizations) is δ = 0.146.

The optic angle 2V is the angle between the two optic axes in a biaxial crystal. The measured values of 2V for this mineral is 6°. It is also possible to calculate a theoretical value of 2V from the measured values of the refractive indices. The calculated value for alstonite is 8°. If the colour of the incident light is changed, then the refractive indices are modified, and the value of 2V changes. This is known as dispersion of the optic axes. For alstonite the effect is weak, with 2V larger for red light than for violet light (r > v).

The optical directions X, Y, and Z are the directions of travel of light with refractive indices n_{α}, n_{β}, and n_{γ} respectively. In general they are not the same as the directions a, b, and c of the crystallographic axes. For alstonite X, Y, and Z are parallel to the c, a, and b crystal axes respectively.

Alstonite fluoresces weak yellow under shortwave and longwave ultraviolet light.

== Physical properties ==
Twinning in alstonite is ubiquitous, forming pseudohexagonal groups. The mineral has one imperfect cleavage and it breaks with an uneven fracture. It is not very hard, with a Mohs hardness of just 4 to 4 1/2, a little harder than fluorite, and its specific gravity is 3.70. It is soluble in dilute HCl and it is not radioactive. The trimorphs alstonite, paralstonite, and barytocalcite all have similar physical properties.

== Type locality ==
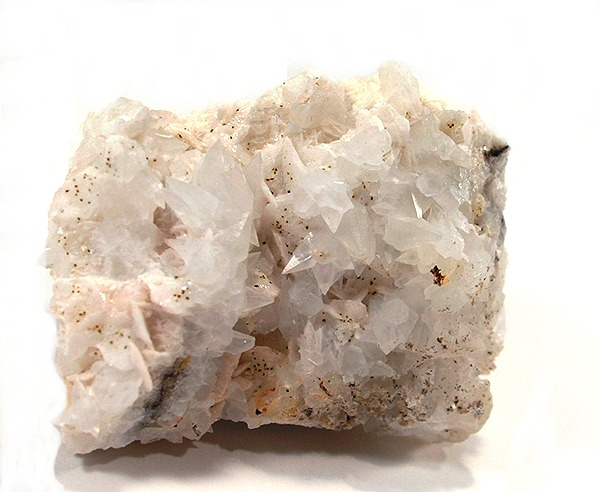
Alstonite crystal group from the type locality in Cumbria (size: 5.1 × 4.1 × 2.7 cm)

There are two type localities, both in the north of England. One is the Bromley Hill Mine (Bloomsberry Horse Level), Nenthead, Alston Moor District, North Pennines, Cumbria, and the other is the Fallowfield Mine, Acomb, Hexham, Tyne Valley, Northumberland. The type material is held at the Freiberg Mining Academy, Germany, 15818.

At the type locality at Brownley Hill, alstonite occurs in low-temperature lead–zinc hydrothermal deposits associated with witherite, calcite, and baryte. The crystals are white to colourless or faintly pink acute pseudohexagonal pyramids or dipyramids up to 6 mm long. In some specimens the alstonite is intergrown with very thin hexagonal platy crystals of nailhead calcite. Alstonite commonly encrusts compact crystalline white to pale pink baryte. Similar crystals have been found at Fallowfield. It occurs typically in low-temperature hydrothermal lead–zinc ore deposits, as is the case at the type localities, and it has also been reported as a rare phase in carbonatites. It occurs associated with calcite, baryte, ankerite, siderite, benstonite, galena, sphalerite, pyrite, and quartz.

== Other localities ==
- USA: Tiny sharp pseudohexagonal dipyramids of alstonite with benstonite and more commonly with witherite are found at the Minerva Mine, Cave-In-Rock, Illinois.
- England: Alstonite has been found in veins at New Brancepeth, near Durham.
- England: At Nentsberry Haggs Mine, which, like the Brownley Hill Mine, is on Alston Moor, Cumbria, baryte has been found as pseudomorphs after alstonite up to 2.5 cm long, associated with sphalerite, galena, and witherite.

== Bibliography ==
- Palache, P.; Berman H.; Frondel, C. (1960). "Dana's System of Mineralogy, Volume II: Halides, Nitrates, Borates, Carbonates, Sulfates, Phosphates, Arsenates, Tungstates, Molybdates, Etc. (Seventh Edition)" John Wiley and Sons, Inc., New York, pp. 218-219.
