= Routhierite =

Rare thallium sulfosalt mineral

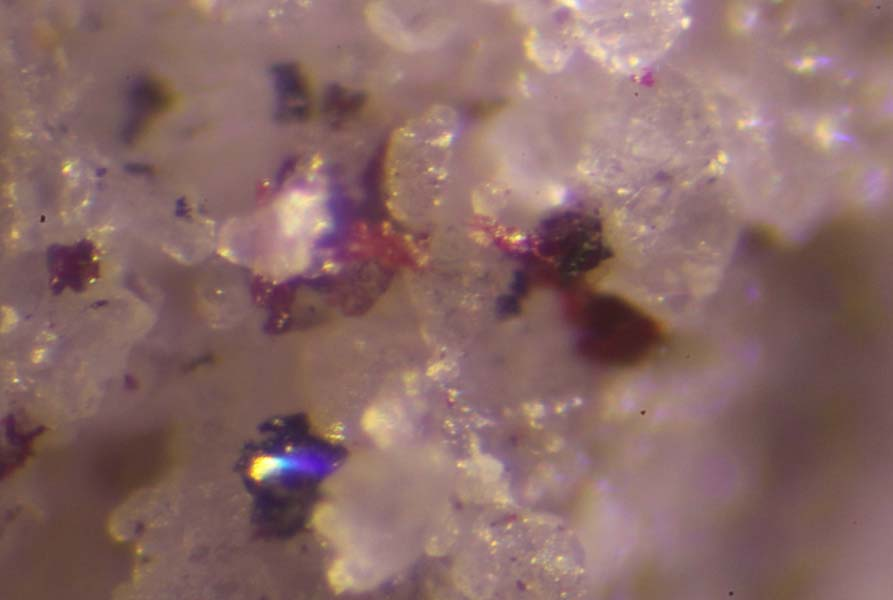
- Routhierite cristals (red).

General
- Category: Sulfosalt mineral
- Formula: Tl(Cu,Ag)(Hg,Zn)_{2}(As,Sb)_{2}S_{6}
- IMA symbol: Rtr
- Strunz classification: 2.GA.40
- Crystal system: Tetragonal
- Crystal class: Ditetragonal pyramidal (4mm); H-M symbol: (4mm)
- Space group: I4mm
- Unit cell: a = 9.9821(11), c = 11.3122(12) [Å]; Z = 4

Identification
- Color: Violet-red
- Crystal habit: Anhedral grains, xenomorphic grains and veinlets
- Twinning: Microscopic polysynthetic twin lamellae
- Cleavage: 2; two perpendicular
- Mohs scale hardness: 3.5
- Luster: Metallic
- Diaphaneity: Opaque
- Density: 5.83
- Pleochroism: Weak

Routhierite is a rare thallium sulfosalt mineral with formula Tl(Cu,Ag)(Hg,Zn)_{2}(As,Sb)_{2}S_{6}.

It was first described in 1974 for an occurrence in the Jas Roux deposit in the French Alps. It was named after French geologist Pierre Routhier (1916–2008). It is also reported from the Northern Ural Mountains, Russia and the Thunder Bay district of Ontario, Canada.
