= Euhedral and anhedral =

Well-formed crystal with easily recognizable sharp faces (and the opposite term)

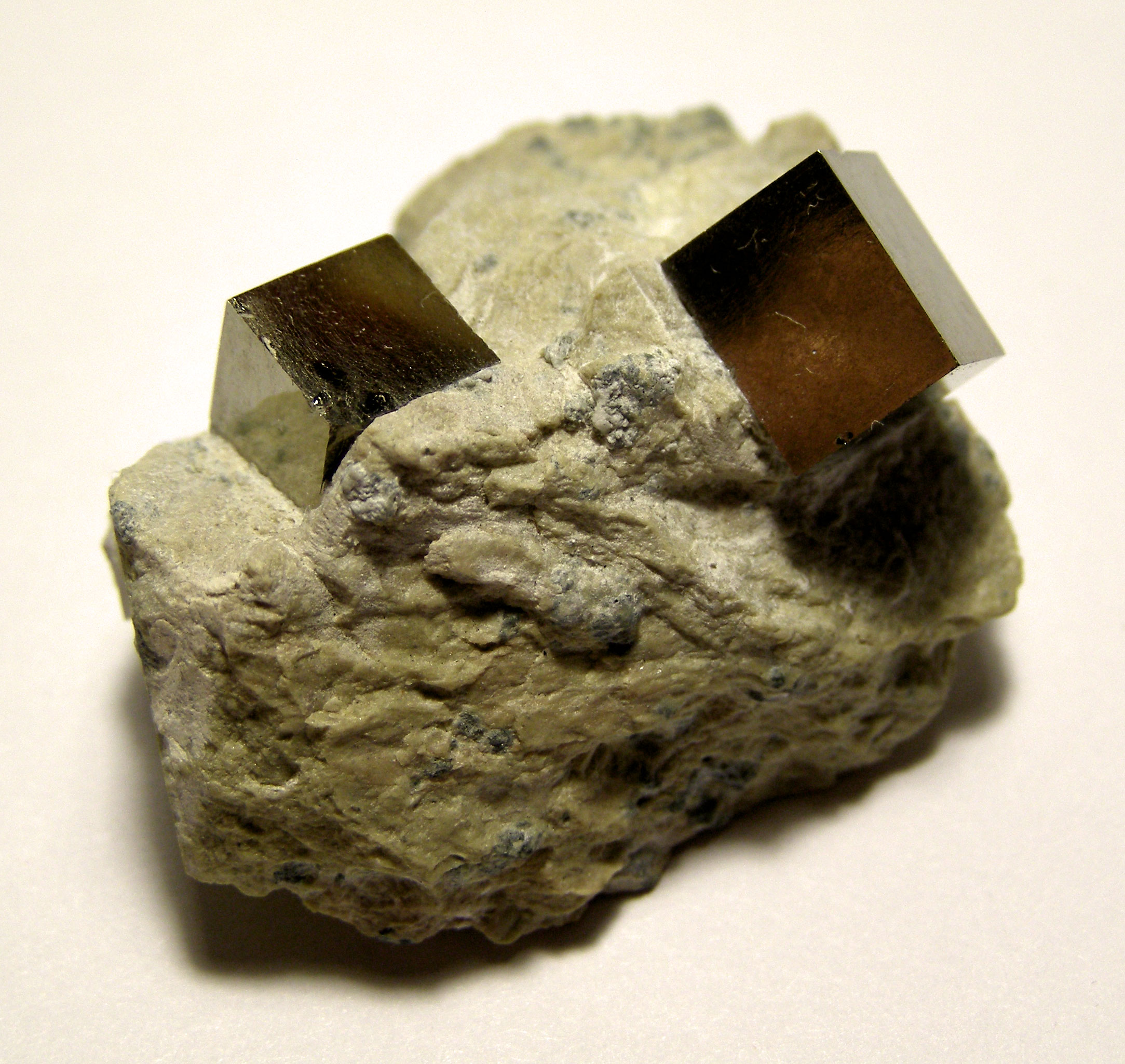
Euhedral pyrite crystals

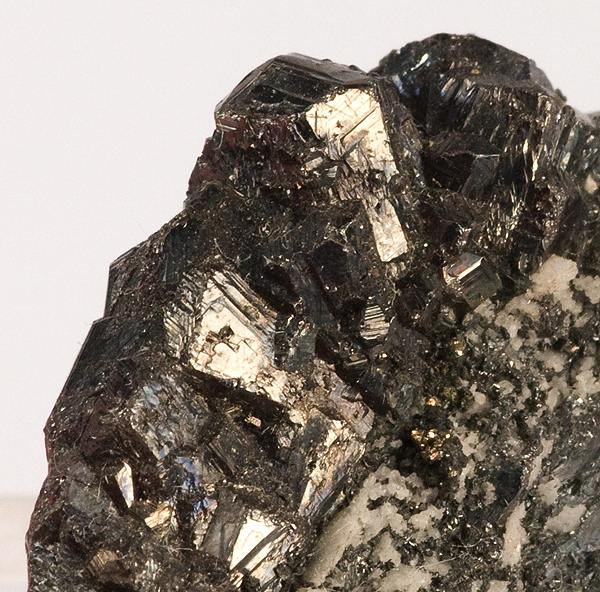
A subhedral sample showing sharp to anhedral pyrargyrite crystals.

Euhedral and anhedral are terms used to describe opposite properties in the formation of crystals. Euhedral (also known as idiomorphic or automorphic) crystals are those that are well-formed, with sharp, easily recognised faces. The opposite is anhedral (also known as xenomorphic or allotriomorphic), which describes rock with a microstructure composed of mineral grains that have no well-formed crystal faces or cross-section shape in thin section.

Anhedral crystal growth occurs in a competitive environment with no free space for the formation of crystal faces. An intermediate texture with some crystal face-formation is termed subhedral (also known as hypidiomorphic or hypautomorphic).

Crystals that grow from cooling liquid magma typically do not form smooth faces or sharp crystal outlines. As magma cools, the crystals grow and eventually touch each other, preventing crystal faces from forming properly or at all.

When snowflakes crystallize, they do not touch each other. Thus, snowflakes form euhedral, six-sided twinned crystals. In rocks, the presence of euhedral crystals may signify that they formed early in the crystallization of liquid magma or perhaps crystallized in a cavity or vug, without steric hindrance, or spatial restrictions, from other crystals.

== Etymology ==
"Euhedral" is derived from the Greek eu meaning "well, good" and hedron meaning a seat or a face of a solid. “Anhedral” derives from the Greek “an”, meaning “not” or “without”.

== Relation of face orientation to structure ==
As a halite crystal is growing, new atoms can very easily attach to the parts of the surface with rough atomic-scale structure and many dangling bonds. Therefore, these parts of the crystal grow out very quickly (yellow arrows). Eventually, the whole surface consists of smooth, stable faces, where new atoms cannot as easily attach themselves.

Euhedral crystals have flat faces with sharp angles. The flat faces (also called facets) are oriented in a specific way relative to the underlying atomic arrangement of the crystal: They are planes of relatively low Miller index. This occurs because some surface orientations are more stable than others (lower surface energy). As a crystal grows, new atoms attach easily to the rougher and less stable parts of the surface, but less easily to the flat, stable surfaces. Therefore, the flat surfaces tend to grow larger and smoother, until the whole crystal surface consists of these plane surfaces. (See diagram.)

== See also ==
- Xenomorph (geology)
- Crystal habit
- Rock microstructure
- List of rock textures
