= Druse (geology) =

Incrustation of small crystals on the surface of a rock or mineral

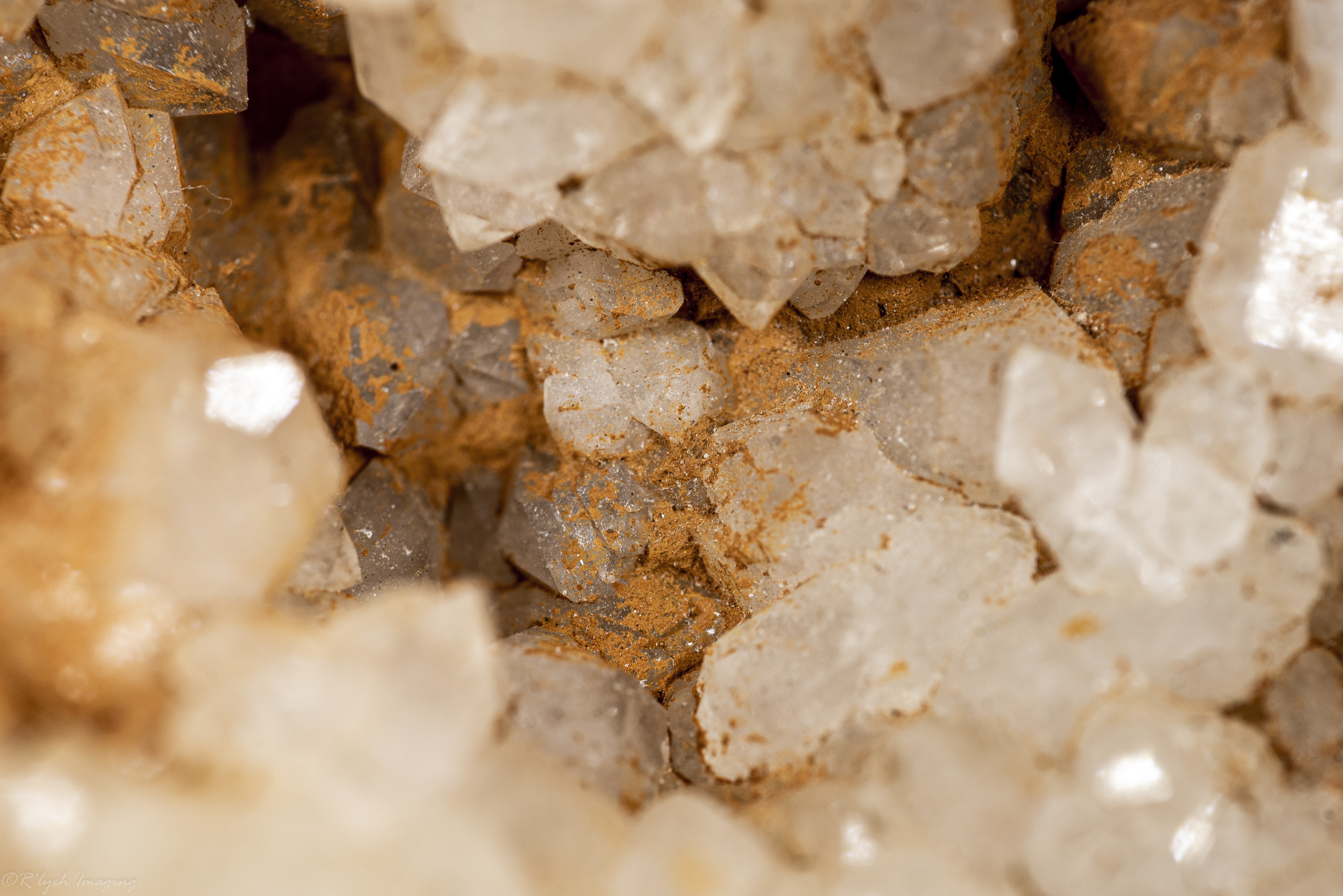
Druse quartz crystals

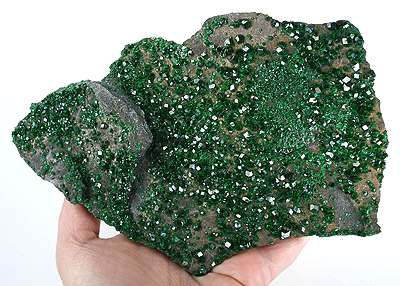
Druse of uvarovite from the Urals; size: 18.3 cm × 13.1 cm × 2.0 cm (7.2 in × 5.2 in × 0.8 in)

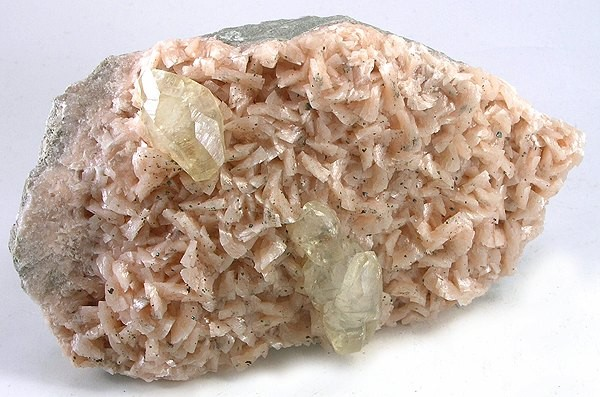
Pink dolomite druse with yellow calcite crystals, Ben Hogan Quarry, Lawrence County Zinc District, Arkansas; size: 14.9 cm × 8.5 cm × 3.7 cm (5.9 in × 3.3 in × 1.5 in)

In geology and mineralogy, druse is a crystal habit represented by the coating of fine crystals on a rock fracture surface, or vein or within a vug or geode.

== See also ==
- Miarolitic cavity
