= Sabatierite =

Selenide of copper and thallium

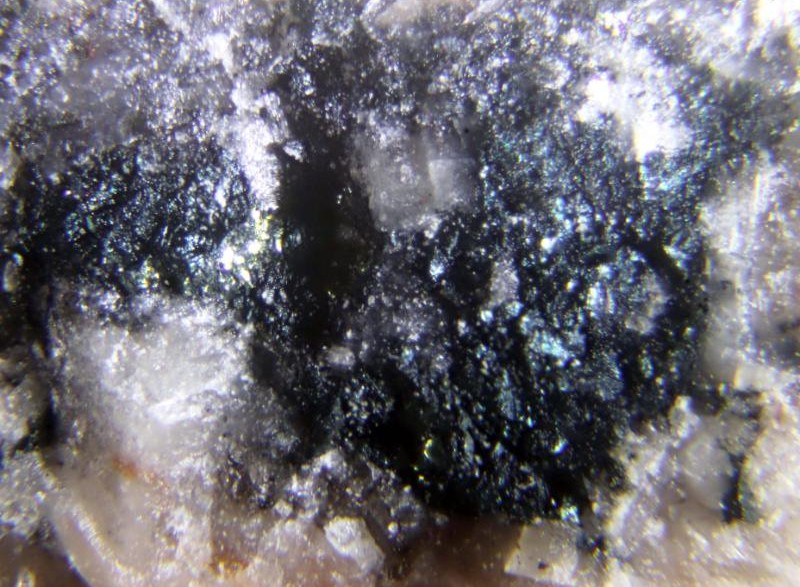
- Image of Sabatierite & Berzelianite

General
- Category: Selenide mineral
- Formula: Cu_{6}TlSe_{4}
- IMA symbol: Sab
- Strunz classification: 2.BD.45
- Dana classification: 02.04.12.02
- Crystal system: Orthorhombic
- Crystal class: Selenides

Identification
- Formula mass: 695.45 gm
- Colour: Bluish gray with cream tint
- Crystal habit: Aggregates, Microscopic crystals
- Mohs scale hardness: 2.5
- Luster: Metallic
- Diaphaneity: Opaque
- Pleochroism: Distinct, in light brown to light blue

Sabatierite (Cu_{6}TlSe_{4}) is a mineral found in the Czech Republic. The composition of the mineral is more likely (Cu_{4}TlSe_{3}) that has been chemically and crystalographically characterized having tetragonal symmetry. It is named for the French mineralogist Germain Sabatier (born 1923).

== See also ==
- Crookesite – Selenide of copper, thallium and silver
- List of minerals
- List of minerals named after people
