= Vug =

Small to medium-sized cavity inside rock

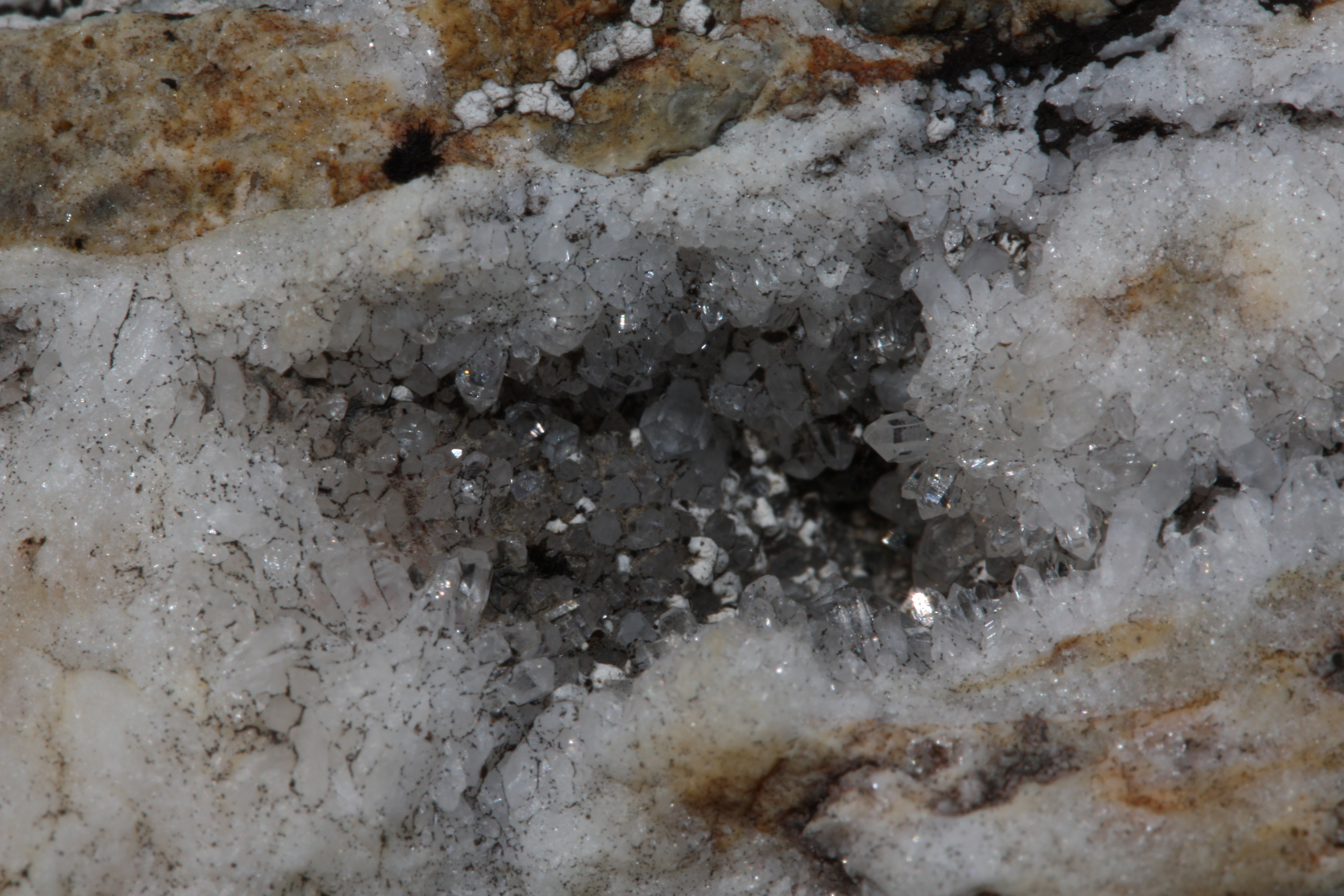
This vug in the Cascade Range is partially filled with quartz crystals.

A vug, vugh, or vugg (/ˈvʌɡ/) is a small- to medium-sized cavity inside rock. It may be formed through a variety of processes. Most commonly, cracks and fissures opened by tectonic activity (folding and faulting) are partially filled by quartz, calcite, and other secondary minerals. Open spaces within breccias formed by an ancient collapse are another important source of vugs.

Vugs may also form when mineral crystals or fossils inside a rock matrix are later removed through erosion or dissolution processes, leaving behind irregular voids. The inner surfaces of such vugs are often coated with a crystal druse. Fine crystals are often found in vugs where the open space allows the free development of external crystal form.

The term vug is not applied to veins and fissures that have become completely filled, but may be applied to any small cavities within such veins. Geodes are a vug-formed rock, although that term is usually reserved for more rounded crystal-lined cavities in sedimentary rocks and ancient lavas.

The word vug was introduced to the English language by Cornish miners, from the days when Cornwall was a major supplier of tin. The Cornish word was vooga, which meant "cave".

== Images ==
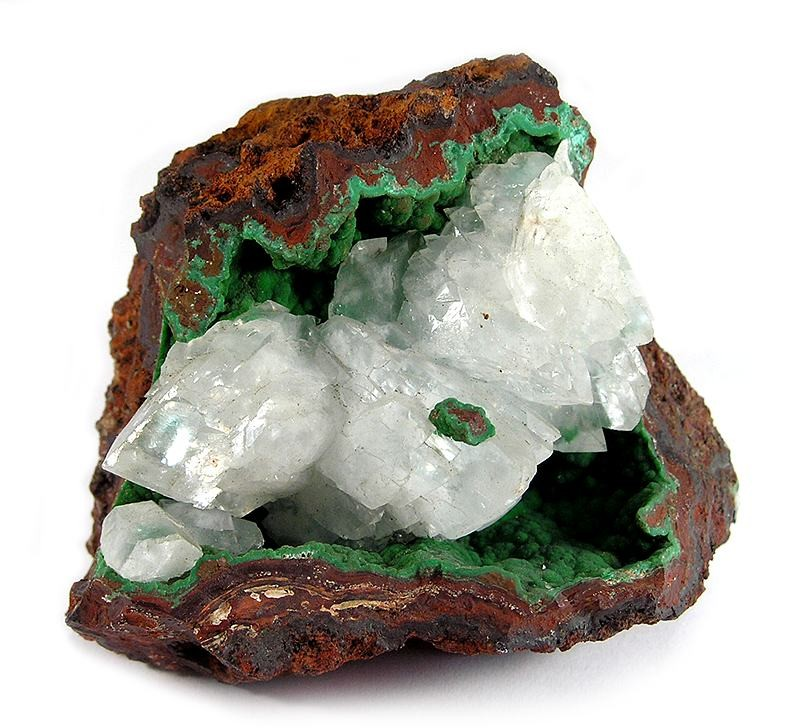
A vug in a limonite matrix is the host for a layer of green botryoids of conichalcite and colorless, translucent rhombs of calcite

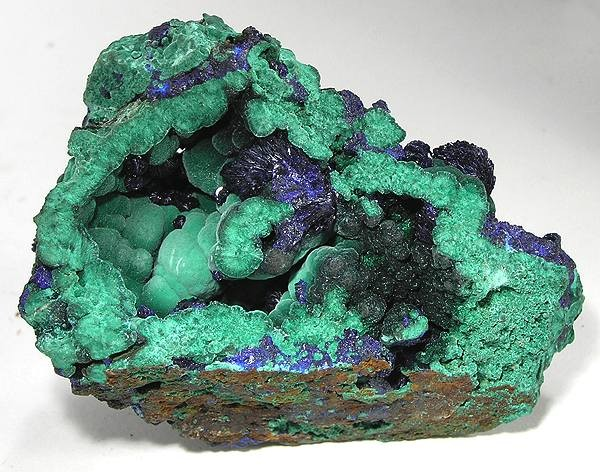
Vug with rosettes of deep blue azurite on a field of malachite

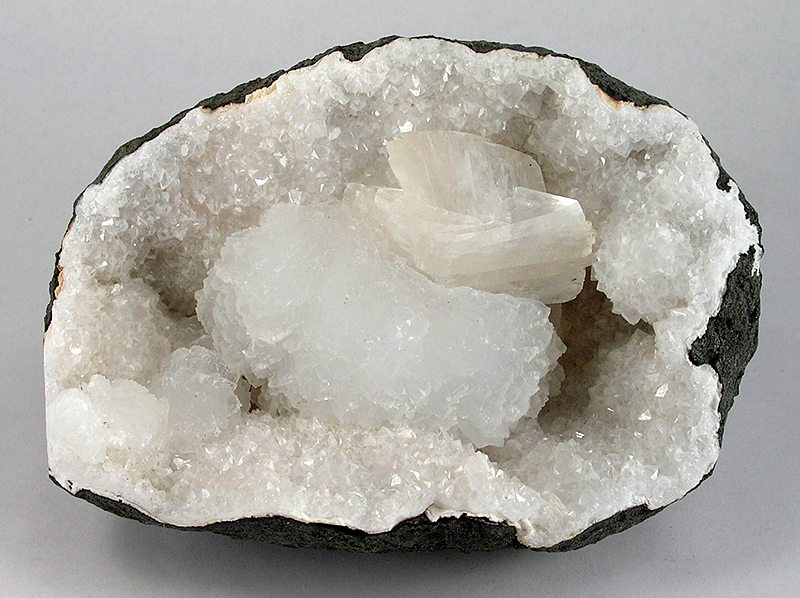
Goosecreekite with heulandite-Ca on quartz

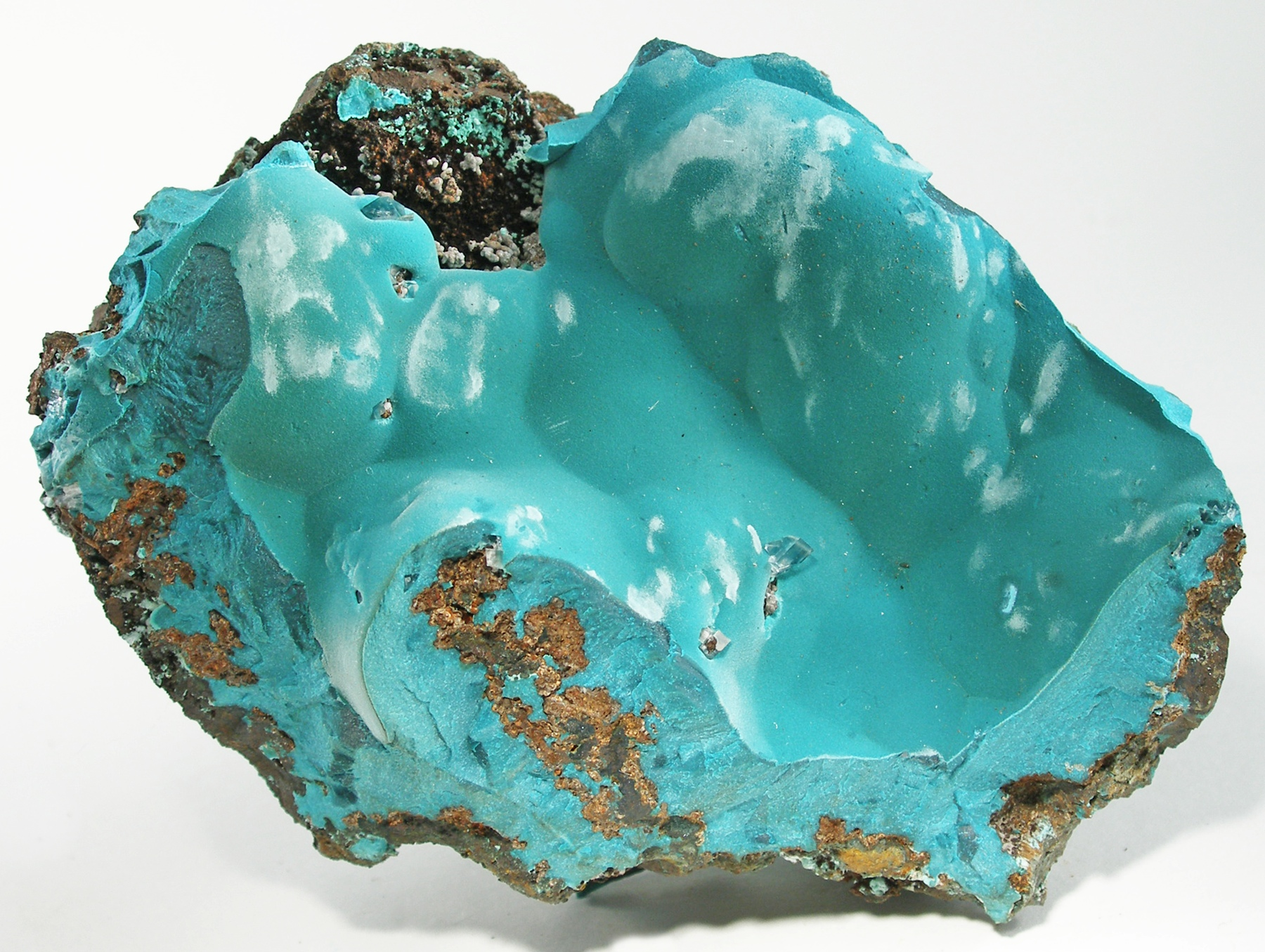
Intergrown botryoids of blue-green rosasite inside the curve of a limonite vug

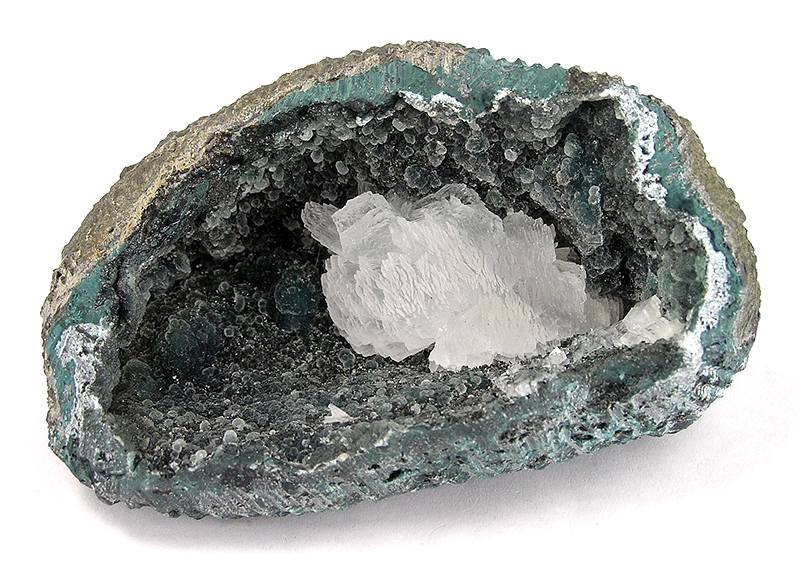
Example of open space in a vug allowing the formation of crystallized minerals

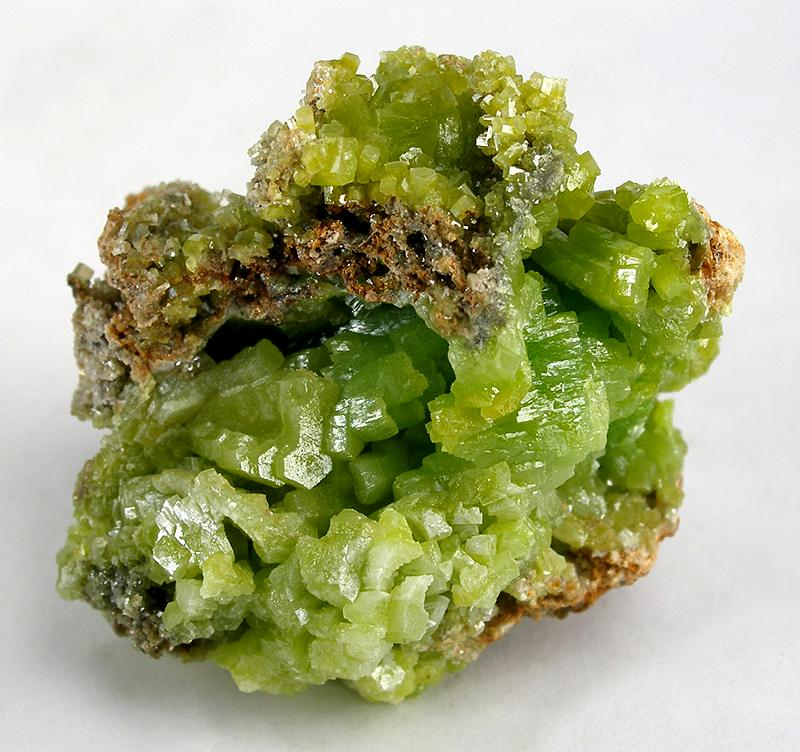
Apple green pyromorphite cluster on limonite matrix

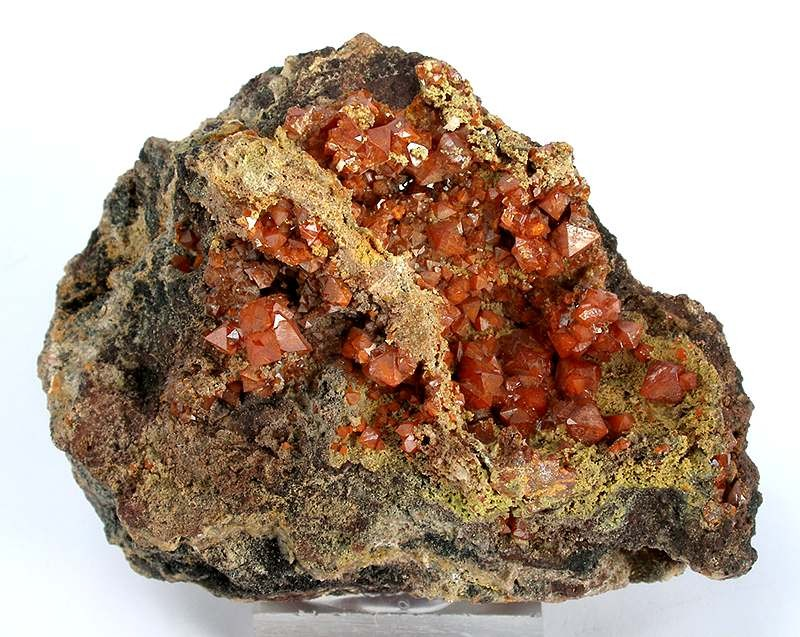
Vug in a limonitic matrix is the host for bi-pyramidal, brownish-red crystals of wulfenite

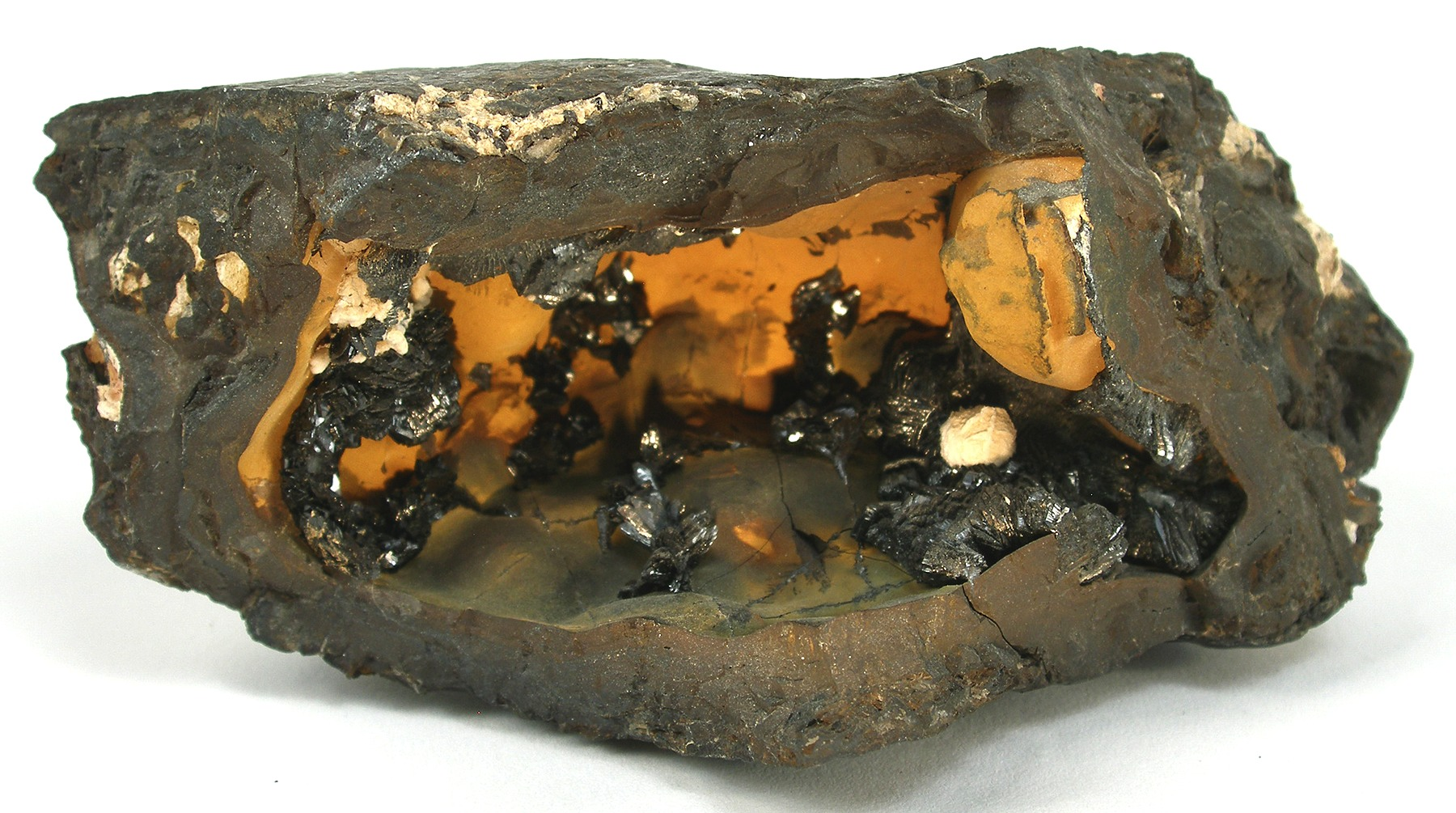
Crystallized groutite scattered about a hollow vug

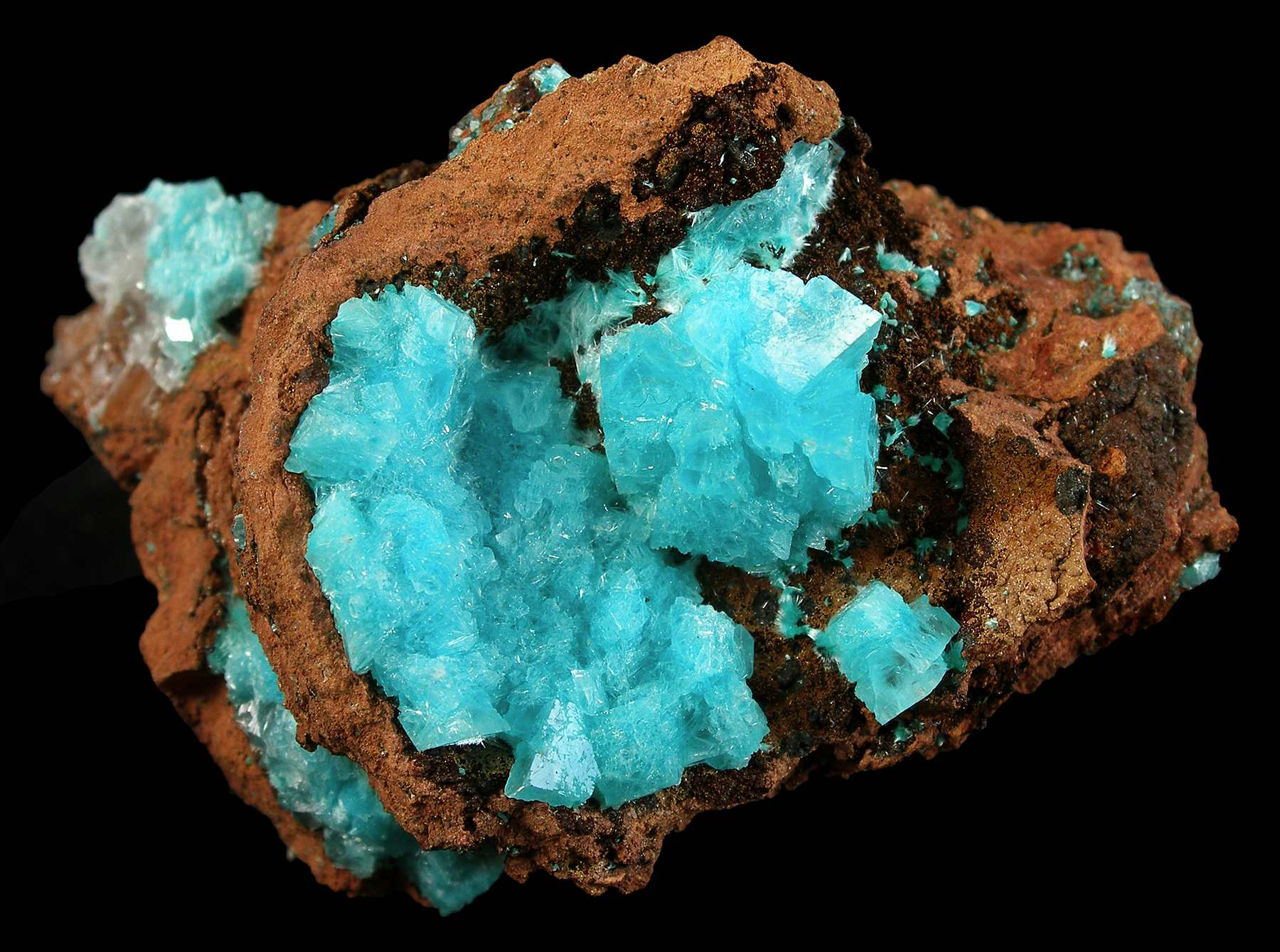
In a vug of limonite are intergrown clusters of rhombohedral calcite with inclusions of fibrous aurichalcite

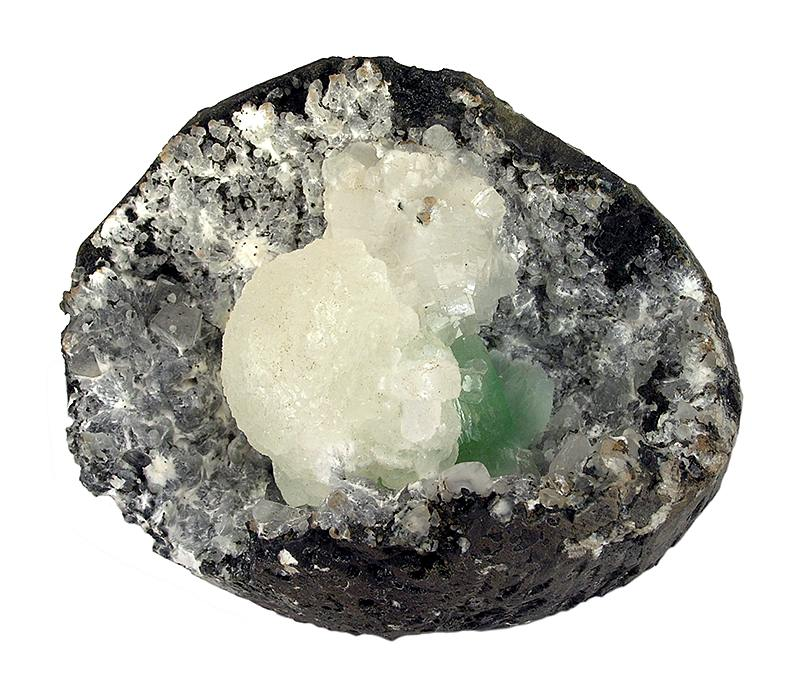
Stellerite, epistilbite, and eluorapophyllite in a basaltic vug

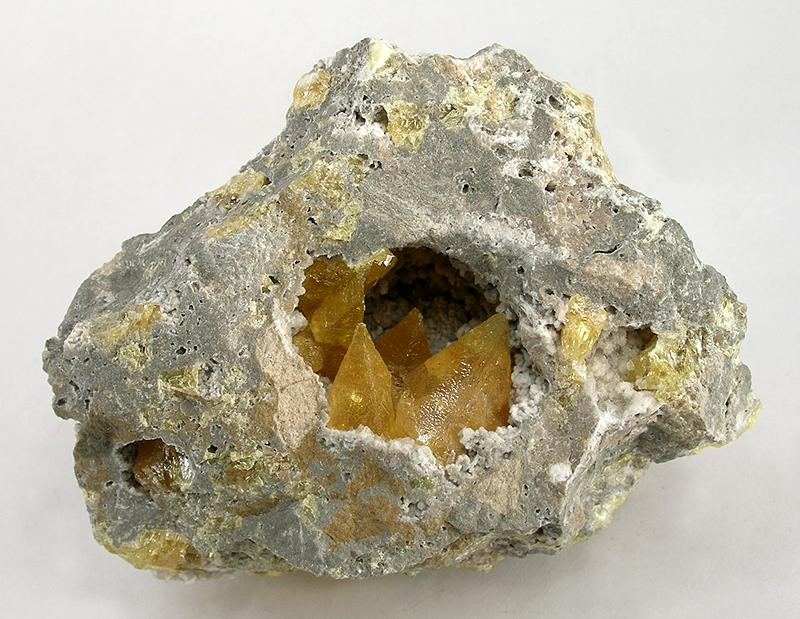
Nestled in its matrix vug are five golden-yellow crystals of sulfur

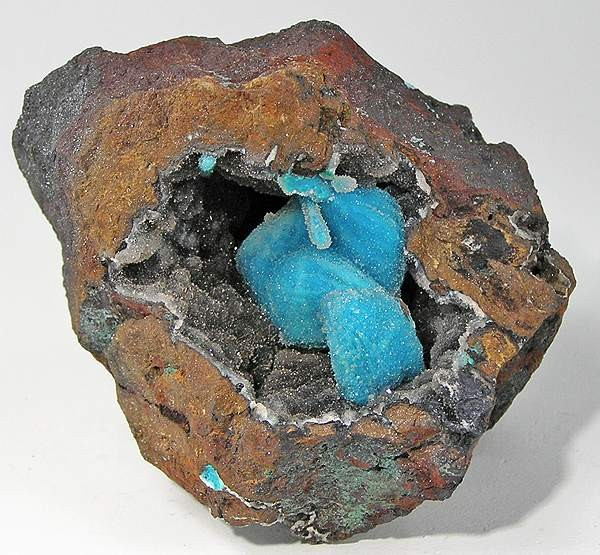
In an open pocket in a matrix of limonite there is a cluster of deep robin's-egg blue chrysocolla with a covering of drusy quartz

== See also ==
- Amygdule
- Rock microstructure
- Vesicular texture
