= Crookesite =

Selenide of copper, thallium and silver

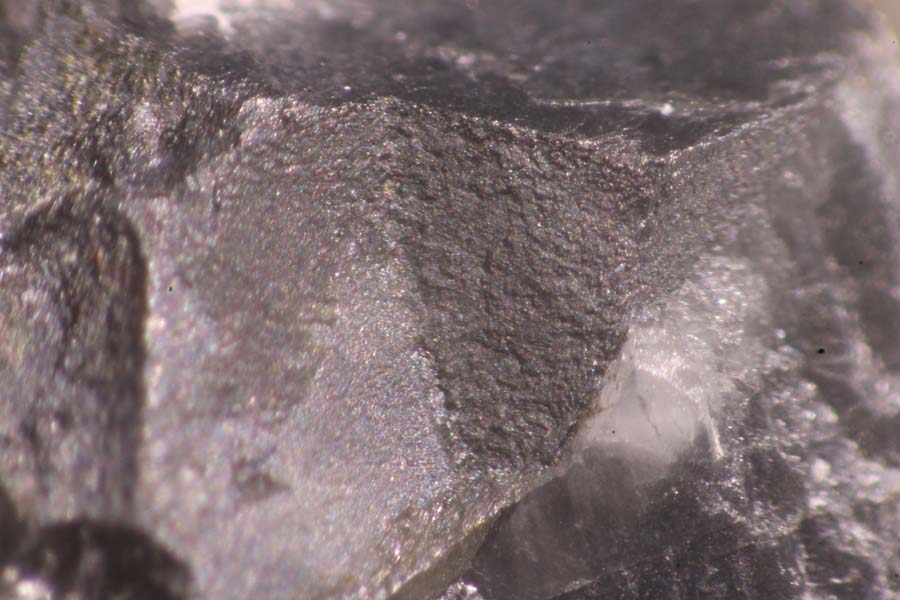

General
- Category: Selenide mineral
- Formula: Cu_{7}(Tl, Ag)Se_{4}
- IMA symbol: Crk
- Strunz classification: 2.BD.50
- Crystal system: Tetragonal
- Crystal class: Disphenoidal (4̅); H-M symbol: (4̅)
- Space group: I4̅

Identification
- Color: Lead-gray
- Crystal habit: As finely divided, disseminated specks, and as small veinlets.
- Cleavage: Good, two at right angles
- Fracture: Brittle
- Mohs scale hardness: 2.5–3
- Luster: Metallic
- Diaphaneity: Opaque
- Specific gravity: 6.90

Crookesite is a selenide mineral composed of copper and selenium with variable thallium and silver.

== Characteristics ==
Its chemical formula is reported either as Cu_{7}(Tl, Ag)Se_{4} or (Cu, Tl, Ag)_{2}Se. It is formed by precipitation from hydrothermal fluids, and contains by mass: 16.3% Tl, 47.3% Cu, 2.9% Ag, and 33.6% Se.

Crookesite is an opaque, bluish grey to pink toned brown metallic mineral crystallizing in the tetragonal system. It has a Mohs hardness of 2.5 to 3 and a specific gravity of 6.9.

== Name and discovery ==
It was discovered in 1866 in Skrikerum, Sweden and named for Sir William Crookes (1832–1919), the discoverer of the element thallium.

== See also ==
- List of minerals
- List of minerals named after people
- Sabatierite – Selenide of copper and thallium
