= Xenomorph (geology) =

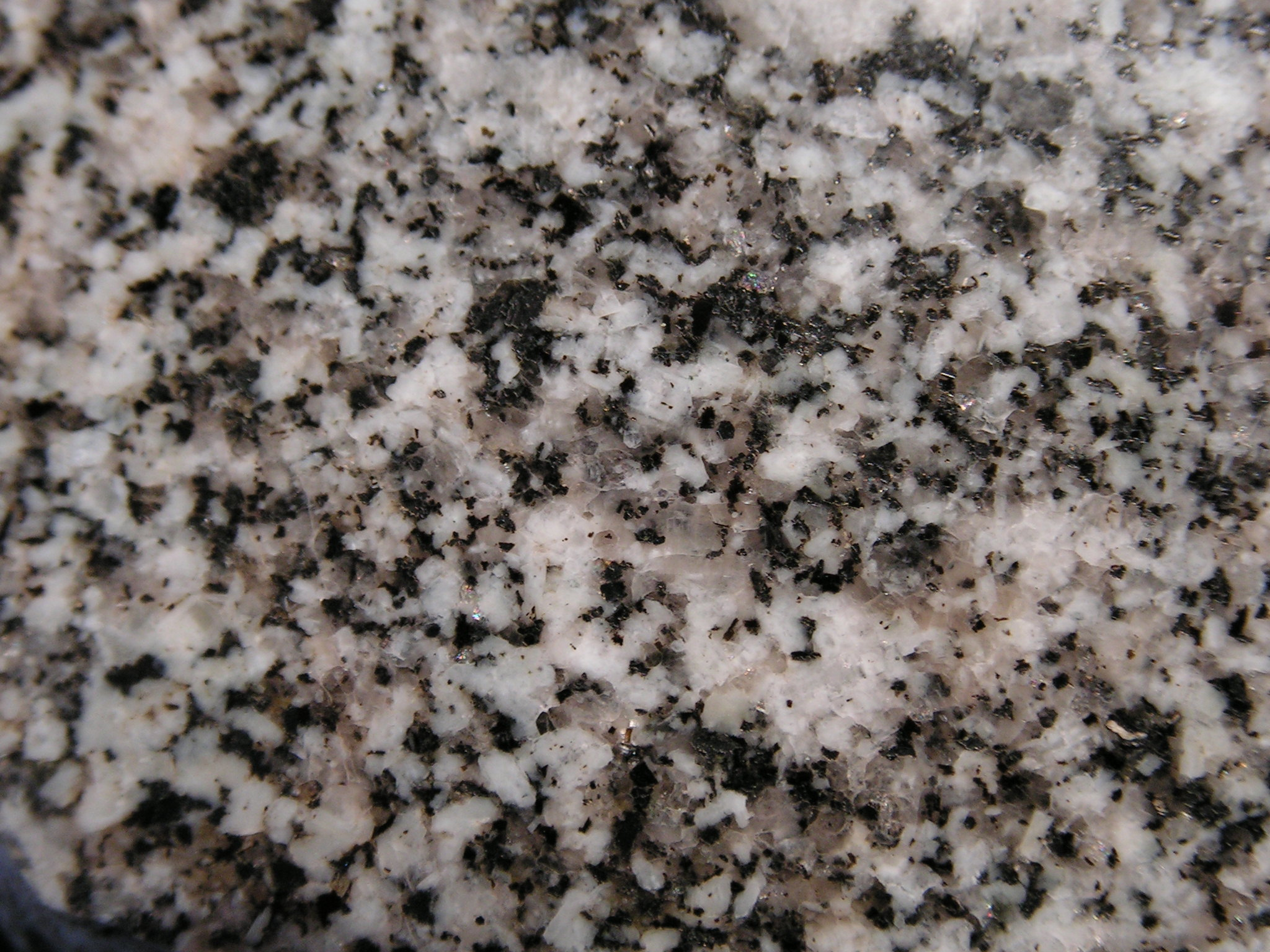
Xenomorph of quartz crystals (grey) in granite

In geology, a xenomorph or allotriomorph is a mineral that did not develop its otherwise typical external crystal form because of late crystallization between earlier formed crystals. Xenomorphs are typical of matrix minerals in rapidly crystallizing volcanic lavas and shallow igneous intrusions. It is also typical of the interstitial or cementing minerals formed during the diagenesis of sedimentary rocks. The opposite is an idiomorph in which the external form is controlled only by the internal crystal structure.
