= Optic axis of a crystal =

Direction of no double refraction

An optic axis of a crystal is a direction in which a ray of transmitted light suffers no birefringence (double refraction). An optic axis is a direction rather than a single line: all rays that are parallel to that direction exhibit the same lack of birefringence.

Crystals may have a single optic axis, in which case they are called uniaxial, or two optic axes, in which case they are biaxial. Non-crystalline (amorphous) materials generally exhibit no birefringence and thus have no optic axis. Uniaxial crystals belong to the tetragonal, hexagonal, or trigonal crystal systems (for example, calcite and quartz). In these crystals, the optic axis coincides with the crystallographic c-axis, and the refractive index is the same in all directions within the plane perpendicular to the optic axis, although the crystal as a whole remains optically anisotropic.

== Explanation ==
The internal structure of crystals (the specific structure of the crystal lattice, and the specific atoms or molecules of which it is composed) causes the speed of light in the material, and therefore the material's refractive index, to depend on both the light's direction of propagation and its polarization. The dependence on polarization causes birefringence, in which two perpendicular polarizations propagate at different speeds and refract at different angles in the crystal. This causes a ray of light to split into an ordinary ray and an extraordinary ray, with orthogonal polarizations. For light propagating along an optic axis, though, the speed does not depend on the polarization, so there is no birefringence although there can be optical activity (a rotation of the plane of polarization).

The refractive index of the ordinary ray is constant for any direction in the crystal. The refractive index of the extraordinary ray varies depending on its direction.

== Liquid crystal directors ==
The mobile axis of a liquid crystal is called a director. It is the space and time average of the orientation of the long molecular axis within a small volume element of material demonstrating a mesophase. Electrical manipulation of the director enables liquid-crystal displays.

== See also ==
- Crystal optics
- Index ellipsoid
