= Witherite =

Barium carbonate mineral

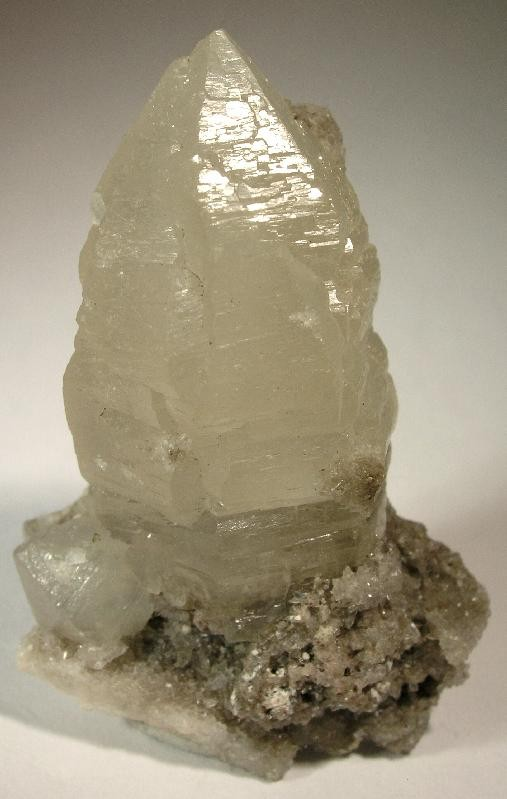
- Witherite from Alston Moor District, Cumbria, England

General
- Category: Carbonate mineral
- Formula: BaCO_{3}
- IMA symbol: Wth
- Strunz classification: 5.AB.15
- Crystal system: Orthorhombic
- Crystal class: Dipyramidal (mmm); H-M symbol: (2/m 2/m 2/m)
- Space group: Pmcn
- Unit cell: a = 5.31 Å, b = 8.9 Å c = 6.43 Å; Z = 4

Identification
- Color: Colorless, white, pale gray, with possible tints of pale-yellow, pale-brown, or pale-green
- Crystal habit: Striated short prismatic crystals, also botryoidal to spherical, columnar fibrous, granular, massive.
- Twinning: On {110}, universal
- Cleavage: Distinct on {010} poor on {110}, {012}
- Fracture: Subconchoidal
- Mohs scale hardness: 3.0–3.5
- Luster: Vitreous, resinous on fractures
- Streak: White
- Diaphaneity: Subtransparent to translucent
- Specific gravity: 4.3
- Optical properties: Biaxial (−)
- Refractive index: n_{α} = 1.529 n_{β} = 1.676 n_{γ} = 1.677
- Birefringence: δ = 0.148
- 2V angle: Measured: 16°, calculated: 8°
- Dispersion: Weak
- Ultraviolet fluorescence: Fluorescent and phosphorescent, short UV=bluish white, long UV=bluish white

Witherite is a barium carbonate mineral, BaCO_{3}, in the aragonite group. Witherite crystallizes in the orthorhombic system and virtually always is twinned. The mineral is colorless, milky-white, grey, pale-yellow, green, to pale-brown. The specific gravity is 4.3, which is high for a translucent mineral. It fluoresces light blue under both long- and short-wave UV light, and is phosphorescent under short-wave UV light.

Witherite forms in low-temperature hydrothermal environments. It is commonly associated with fluorite, celestine, galena, barite, calcite, and aragonite. Witherite occurrences include: Cave-in-Rock, Illinois, US; Pigeon Roost Mine, Glenwood, Arkansas, US; Settlingstones Mine Northumberland; Alston Moor, Cumbria; Anglezarke, Lancashire and Burnhope, County Durham, England; Thunder Bay area, Ontario, Canada, Germany, and Poland (Tarnowskie Góry and Tajno at Suwałki Region).

Witherite was named after William Withering (1741–1799) an English physician and naturalist who in 1784 published his research on the new mineral. He could show that barite and the new mineral were two different minerals.

== Discovery ==
In 1789 the German geologist Abraham Gottlob Werner named the mineral witherite in honour of William Withering. The Matthew Boulton mineral collection of Birmingham Museum and Art Gallery may contain one of the earliest known specimens of witherite. A label in Boulton's handwriting, records: "No.2 Terra Ponderosa Aerata, given me by Dr. Withering".

== Risk to human health ==
The 18th-century naturalist Dr. Leigh recorded its lethal effects after the death of a farmer's wife and child. James Watt Jnr. experimented with the mineral on animals and he recorded the same lethal properties. Until the 18th century farmers at Anglezarke used the mineral as rat poison.

== Industrial use ==
An experiment conducted by Josiah Wedgwood, led to it being used in his 'Jasper ware'; the mineral had previously been considered as worthless. Witherite has been used for hardening steel, and for making cement, glass, enamelware, soap, dye and explosives.

Witherite crystallizes in the orthorhombic system. The crystals are invariably twinned together in groups of three, giving rise to pseudo-hexagonal forms somewhat resembling bipyramidal crystals of quartz, the faces are usually rough and striated horizontally. It transforms into an hexagonal phase at 1084 K that changes into a cubic phase at 1254 K. The mineral is named after William Withering, who in 1784 recognized it to be chemically distinct from barytes. It occurs in veins of lead ore at Hexham in Northumberland, Alston in Cumbria, Anglezarke, near Chorley in Lancashire and a few other localities. Witherite is readily altered to barium sulfate by the action of water containing calcium sulfate in solution and crystals are therefore frequently encrusted with barytes. It is the chief source of barium salts and is mined in considerable amounts in Northumberland. It is used for the preparation of rat poison, in the manufacture of glass and porcelain, and formerly for refining sugar. It is also used for controlling the chromate to sulfate ratio in chromium electroplating baths.

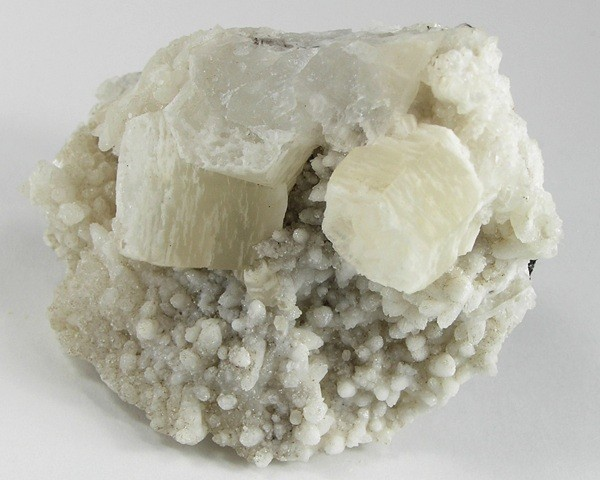
Two sharp pseudohexagonal crystals of witherite on calcite from Hardin County, Illinois (size: 6.4 × 5.4 × 3.4 cm)

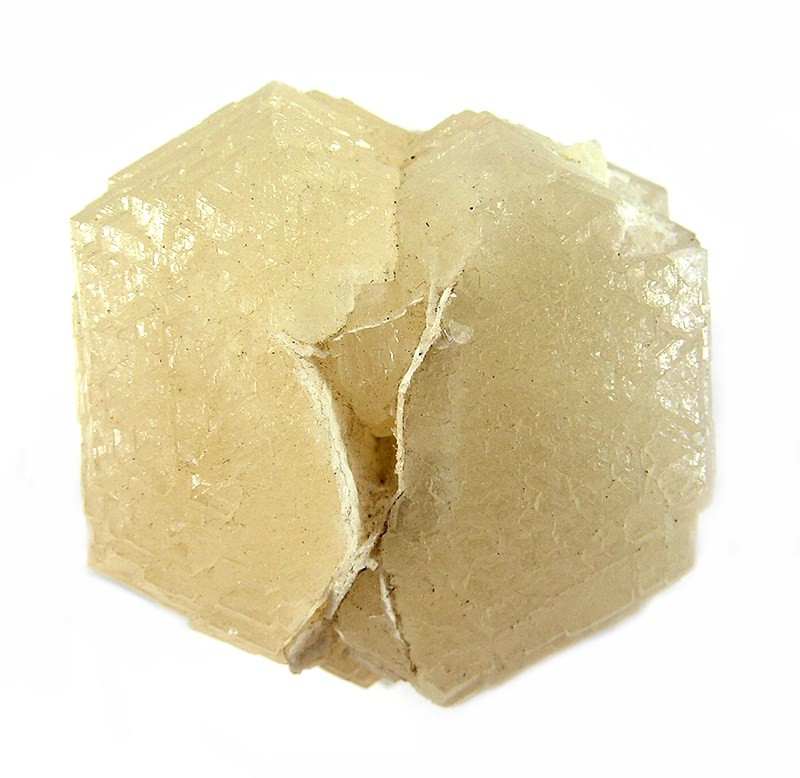
Witherite crystal from the Cave-in-Rock Sub-District, Illinois – Kentucky Fluorspar District, Hardin County, Illinois

== See also ==
- List of minerals
- List of minerals named after people
