= Hallbankgate =

Village in Cumbria, England

Coordinates: 54.9284°N 2.6491°W

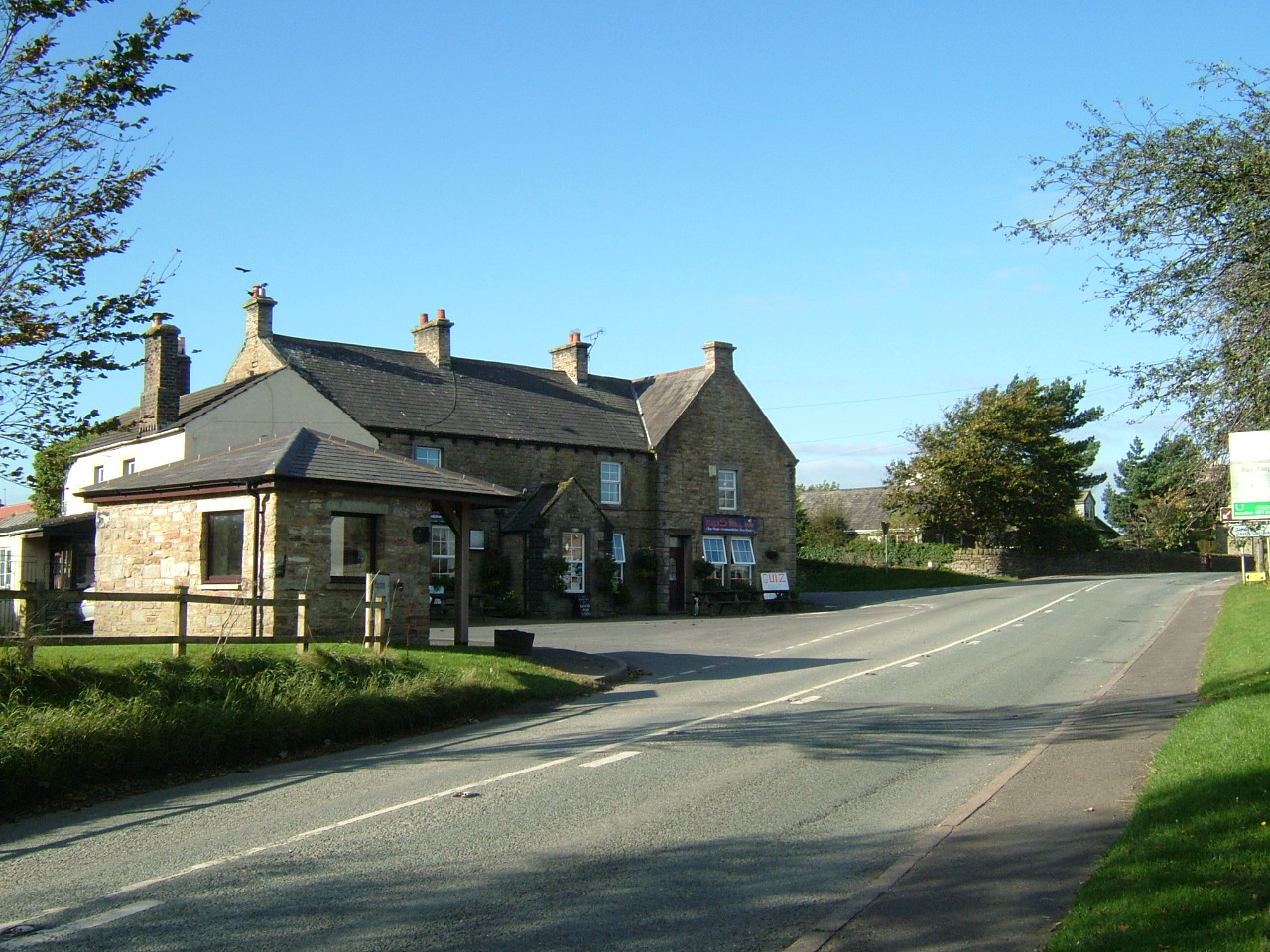
- The Belted Will Inn, at the village centre

- Location in the former Carlisle district, Cumbria Location within Cumbria
- Population: 60
- OS grid reference: NY585595
- Civil parish: Farlam
- Unitary authority: Cumberland
- Ceremonial county: Cumbria
- Region: North West
- Country: England
- Sovereign state: United Kingdom
- Post town: BRAMPTON
- Postcode district: CA8
- Dialling code: 016977
- Police: Cumbria
- Fire: Cumbria
- Ambulance: North West
- UK Parliament: Carlisle

Hallbankgate is a village in Cumbria, England, 13 miles (21 km) east of Carlisle. A former coal and lead mining village, it straddles the A689 Brampton to Alston road. Limestone is quarried here and it once had a gasworks and a forge. The village has a primary school, a village shop and tea room and a pub. There are three other hamlets in the civil parish, Farlam, Kirkhouse and Tindale.

== Mining and quarrying ==
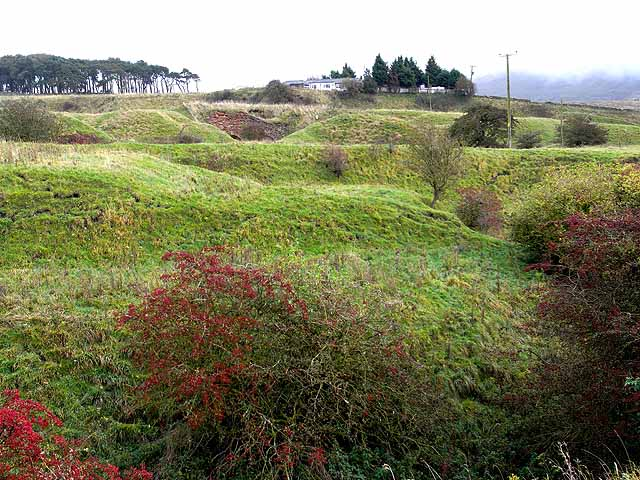
Limestone quarries to the south of Hallbankgate

There were many coal mines surrounding Hallbankgate, exploiting shallow lying seams on a steep incline. The closest was the Roachburn pit, at Coalfell where three men lost their lives in 1908. The subsequent accident report documents a very wet electrically driven pit with fractured seams butting up to a slab of clay- and this was typical of most pits in the area. After the accident the pit closed. It was worked by the Thompson family of Kirkhouse under a lease from Lord Carlisle, and passed under and was connected to their Byrom Pit. It had employed 300 men of which 200 were to lose their jobs and move out of the area. Thompson gave up the lease, which was taken up by the Naworth coal company which worked the other mines in the area. The Gairs mine NY 585 554 is often described as being in Hallbankgate though lies in parish of Castle Carrock. In 1925, it had 55 working underground and 28 above, though two years earlier it had employed 148 underground and 44 above. It output 70,000 tons of household and steam coal. It was a safe mine and worked two seams, known as the Little Limestone Coal and the Little Limestone seam. It was abandoned in 1936. It was operated by the Naworth Coal Company. There were other mines in the area notably the Tindale Drift Mine and the Black Syke Mine in Haltwhistle, and Bishops Hill Colliery at Brampton and the Naworth Colliery and drift mines at Midgeholme. Limestone was quarried at the Silvertop Quarry, and there was a spelter works at Tindale which would process zinc and lead.

== Lord Carlisle's railway ==
Hallbankgate stood at the top of a railway incline on the "Lord Carlisle's Railway" which linked Brampton Junction with the various mines and quarries in the vicinity of Hallbankgate. The Brampton Railway originated as a wooden wagonway on Tindale Fell. The mainline to Brampton Coal Staithe was built in 1798, and it was in operation in 1799. In 1808 the track was relaid using wrought iron rails, This was the first place where they were used commercially. The gauge was changed to 4 ft 8 1/2 in (1,435 mm) standard gauge, the gauge used by Stephenson. In 1836, the route below Hallbankgate was realigned to it could link with the Newcastle and Carlisle Railway at Brampton Junction station. The incline from Kirkhouse had at one point a 1 in 17 gradient, adhesion engines could only work slopes up to 1 in 100, so this section of the track was operated as a gravity driven inclined plane. The line was worked by steam, and until 1840 the engine used was The Rocket. There was a passenger service but the line was mainly used to get the coal from the neighbouring mines to Brampton. There was an engine shed built at Hallbankgate, and above the village lines were laid to each pit. The line continued to Halton Lea Gate, but was extended to Lambley and Lambley Junction in 1852. The line finally closed in 1953. Blacksyke junction is just to the east of the village and the site on a level crossing to the west.

== See also ==
- Listed buildings in Farlam
