= Tindale, Cumbria =

Hamlet in Cumbria, England

Coordinates: 54.927°N 2.598°W

Tindale
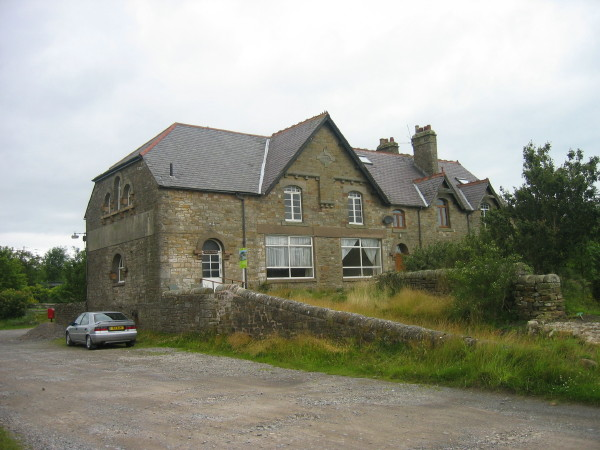
- The Emporium, Tindale

- Location in the former Carlisle district, Cumbria Location within Cumbria
- OS grid reference: NY616593
- Civil parish: Farlam
- Unitary authority: Cumberland
- Ceremonial county: Cumbria
- Region: North West
- Country: England
- Sovereign state: United Kingdom
- Post town: BRAMPTON
- Postcode district: CA8
- Dialling code: 016977
- Police: Cumbria
- Fire: Cumbria
- Ambulance: North West
- UK Parliament: Carlisle

Tindale or Tindale Fell is a hamlet in the parish of Farlam in the Cumberland district of the English county of Cumbria. It is to the south of the A689 Brampton to Alston road. It is a former mining village – both coal and lead were mined here. Limestone was quarried here.

Tindale is approximately 15 miles east of Carlisle.

It was here that Stephenson's Rocket resided before it was donated to the Science Museum in London.

== Mining and quarrying ==
Though often located in Brampton, the Gairs mine NY 585 554 is described as being in Hallbankgate in 1925. It had 55 working underground and 28 above, though two years earlier it had employed 148 underground and 44 above. It output 70,000 tons of household and steam coal. It was a safe mine and worked two seams, known as the Little Limestone Coal and the Little Limestone seam. It was abandoned in 1936. It was operated by the Naworth Coal Company. There were other mines in the area notably the Tindale Drift Mine and the Black Syke Mine in Haltwhistle, and Roachburn and Bishops Hill Colliery at Brampton and the Naworth Colliery and drift mines at Midgeholme.

Limestone was quarried at the Silvertop Quarry.

== Lord Carlisle's railway ==
Hallbankgate stood at the top of a railway incline on 'Lord Carlisle's Railway' which linked Brampton Junction with the various mines and quarries in the vicinity of Hallbankgate. The Brampton Railway originated as a wooden wagonway on Tindale Fell. The mainline to Brampton Coal Staithe was built in 1798, and it was in operation in 1799.

In 1808 the track was relaid using wrought iron rails, This was the first place where they were used commercially.

In 1836, the route below Hallbankgate was realigned to it could link with the Newcastle and Carlisle Railway at Brampton Junction station. The rails were re-spaced to Stephenson's 4' 8 1/2¨ gauge. The line was worked by steam, and the engine used was Stephenson's Rocket, bought for £300. There was a passenger service but the line was mainly used to get the coal from the neighbouring mines to Brampton. There was an engine shed built at Hallbankgate, and above the village lines were laid to each pit. The line continued to Halton Lea Gate, but was extended to Lambley and Lambley Junction in 1852. The line finally closed in 1953. Blacksyke junction is just to the east of the village and the site on a level crossing to the west.
