= Midgeholme Coalfield =

Coal mining region in England

Coordinates: 54.9237°N 2.5630°W

The Midgeholme Coalfield is a coalfield in Midgeholme, on the border of Cumbria with Northumberland in northern England. It is the largest of a series of small coalfields along the south side of the Tyne Valley and which are intermediate between the Northumberland and Durham Coalfields to the east and the Cumberland Coalfield to the west. Like the other small coalfields to its east, this small outlier of the Coal Measures at Midgeholme occurs on the Stublick-Ninety Fathom Fault System, a zone of faults defining the northern edge of the Alston Block otherwise known as the North Pennines. It is recorded that coal was being mined at Midgeholme in the early seventeenth century. In the 1830s, coal trains were being hauled from Midgeholme Colliery along the Brampton Railway by Stephenson's Rocket. The early workings have left a legacy of spoil heaps, bell pits, shafts and adits. There is no current coal production. However in January 2014, Northumberland County Council gave planning permission for the open-cast extraction of 37,000 tonnes of coal at Halton Lea Gate. This may open the way for other applications to mine the coalfield. In 1990 a proposal to mine reserves of 60,000 tonnes of good-quality coal at Lambley, Northumberland was rejected, but the prospect for a successful application has now changed, since the Planning Inspector allowed the development to proceed at Halton Lea Gate on appeal.

The following coal seams are recognised from the Pennine Lower Coal Measures within this coalfield. The list is organised stratigraphically, with the uppermost seam first:

- Bounder
- Craignook Upper
- Craignook Lower
- Little
- Threequarters Half
- Threequarters Quarter
- Wellsyke
- High Main
- Slag
- Low Main
- Ganister Clay (Kellah)
- Gubeon
