= Midgeholme =

Hamlet in Cumbria, England

Coordinates: 54°55′26″N 02°33′47″W

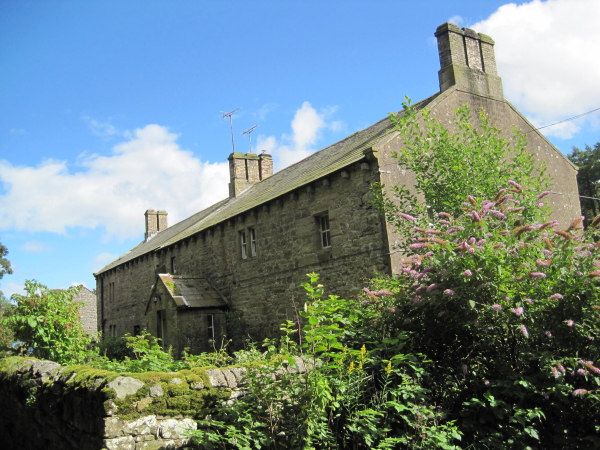
- The grade II* listed Tarn House in the parish

- Location within Cumbria
- Population: 67 (2001 census)
- Civil parish: Midgeholme
- Unitary authority: Cumberland
- Ceremonial county: Cumbria
- Region: North West
- Country: England
- Sovereign state: United Kingdom

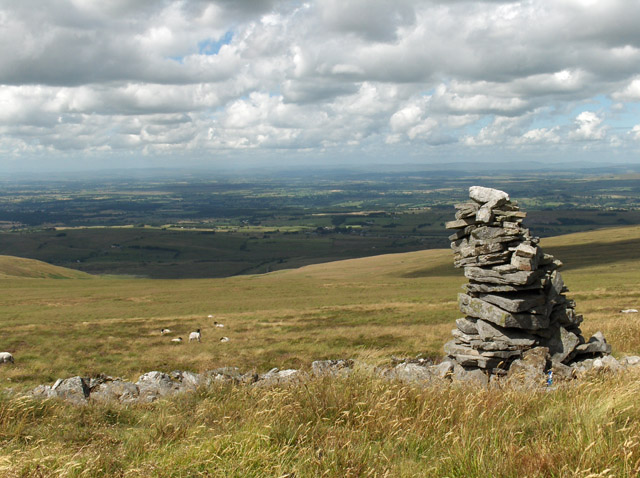
Cold Fell, on the parish's south west border

Midgeholme is a hamlet and civil parish in the Cumberland district, Cumbria, England. At the 2001 census the parish had a population of 67.

The parish is bordered to the north by Farlam; to the east by Hartleyburn and Knaresdale with Kirkhaugh, both in Northumberland; to the south by Geltsdale; and to the west by Hayton.

Cold Fell, at 621 metres (2,037 ft), is on the boundary of Midgeholme and Geltsdale parishes. The hamlet of Midgeholme and the disused Midgeholme Coalfield are in the north east of the parish, near the A689 road between Brampton and Lambley.

== Listed buildings ==
As of 2017 the only listed building in the parish is Tarn House, built in the late 15th century and extended and altered in 1843, at Grade II*. It overlooks Tindale Tarn, the north shore of which forms the boundary with Farlam parish.
