= Brampton Town railway station =

Disused railway station in Cumbria, England

Coordinates: 54.94241°N 2.72271°W

Brampton Town
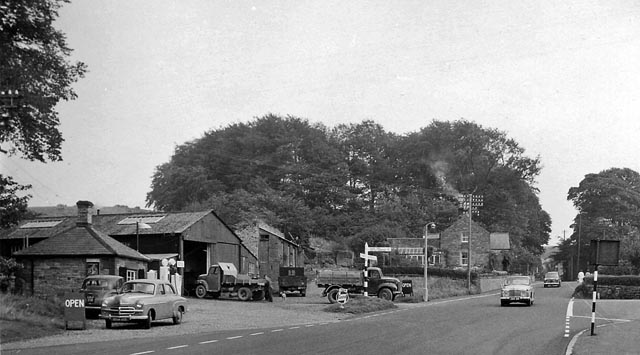
- Site of Brampton Town Station, 1962

General information
- Location: Brampton, Cumberland; England

Other information
- Status: Disused

History
- Original company: North Eastern Railway
- Post-grouping: London and North Eastern Railway

Key dates
- 13 July 1836: Station opens as Brampton
- 1 July 1881: renamed Brampton Town
- 1 May 1890: closed
- 1 August 1913: reopened
- 1 March 1917: closed
- 1 March 1920: reopened
- 29 October 1923: Station closed for passengers
- 31 December 1923: closed completely
Location

Brampton Town railway station was the terminus of the Brampton Town Branch, in the centre of Brampton, Cumbria, England. It was opened in 1775, to work on the Earl of Carlisle's Waggonway. By 1836, a horse-driven passenger service had been implemented when the track was realigned to meet up with the Newcastle and Carlisle Railway, providing a service to Milton station, now Brampton (Cumbria) station, about a mile out of town.

The passenger service ended in 1881, however in 1913 the railway was taken over by the North Eastern Railway (NER), the track was relaid and a steam hauled service to Brampton Junction was introduced. The NER did not run passenger services between 1917 and 1920. After being incorporated into the London and North Eastern Railway it was closed to passengers on 29 October 1923 and for goods on 31 December 1923. The track was lifted shortly afterwards but the course of the line can still be easily traced over most of its length as much of it now forms a public footpath.

Preceding station	Disused railways	Following station
Terminus	Earl of Carlisle's Waggonway; Brampton Town Branch	Brampton Junction
