= Castle Carrock Reservoir =

Reservoir in Cumbria, England

Coordinates: 54°53′04″N 2°42′45″W

Castle Carrock Reservoir is an artificial open reservoir in the civil parish of Castle Carrock, south of the village, in the Cumberland district, in the ceremonial county of Cumbria, England.

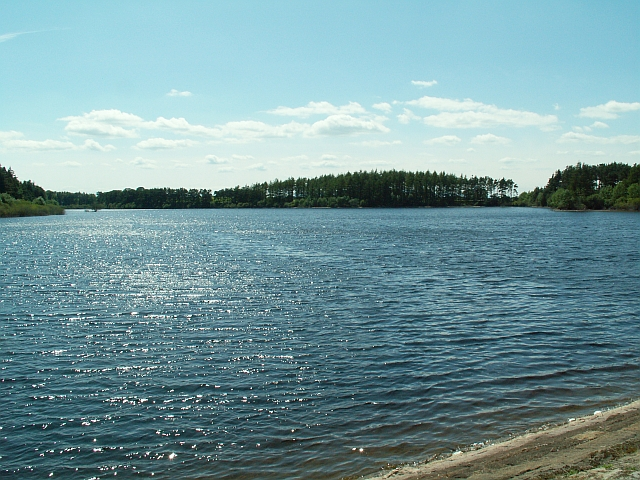
Castle Carrock Reservoir

The reservoir is quite unusual in that it holds water from a different catchment to which it is located. In fact, no water is taken from its own catchment area, that of Castle Carrock Beck, which is culverted around the side of the reservoir. The reservoir takes water, via a 20" pipe, from the rivers New Water and Old Water near their confluence to form the River Gelt. The Castle Carrock reservoir then supplies a reservoir at Cumwhinton via a 16" pipe, for onward supply to Carlisle and the surrounding area via a 21" pipe. Cumwhinton Water Treatment Works pumps water from the nearby River Eden as well as taking water, by gravity, from Castle Carrock Reservoir.

The reservoir contains a treatment works and is part of the wider Geltsdale Scheme, developed to provide water to Carlisle and its surrounding area.

The reservoir sits at 151 metres above sea level, has a surface area of 0.18 square kilometres, and a mean depth of 4.674 metres.

The reservoir is currently owned and operated by United Utilities.

== History ==
Carlisle Corporation was responsible for the supply of water in Carlisle from the late 19^{th} century. Carlisle's water supply at that time was primarily abstraction from the River Petterril at Stonyholme, where there was a pumping station and extensive filtration beds. With added responsibility for the supply of water in the surrounding areas to Carlisle, and the increased demand from within the city, the corporation looked at options for increasing the water supply. Three options were considered, the extension of the facilities at Stonyholme, a new pumped abstraction scheme on the River Eden near Wetheral or a gravitational supply from the River Gelt in the Pennines.

In 1897 the decision was taken to proceed with the Geltsdale scheme, and this was enabled through the Carlisle Corporation (Water) Act 1898 (61 & 62 Vict. c. ccxxv).

The reservoir was opened in 1909. Constructed by Carlisle Corporation Waterworks as part of the wider 'Geltsdale Scheme'. During construction a narrow gauge railway system was used, the Geltsdale Reservoir Railway.
