= Spelter =

Zinc-lead alloy

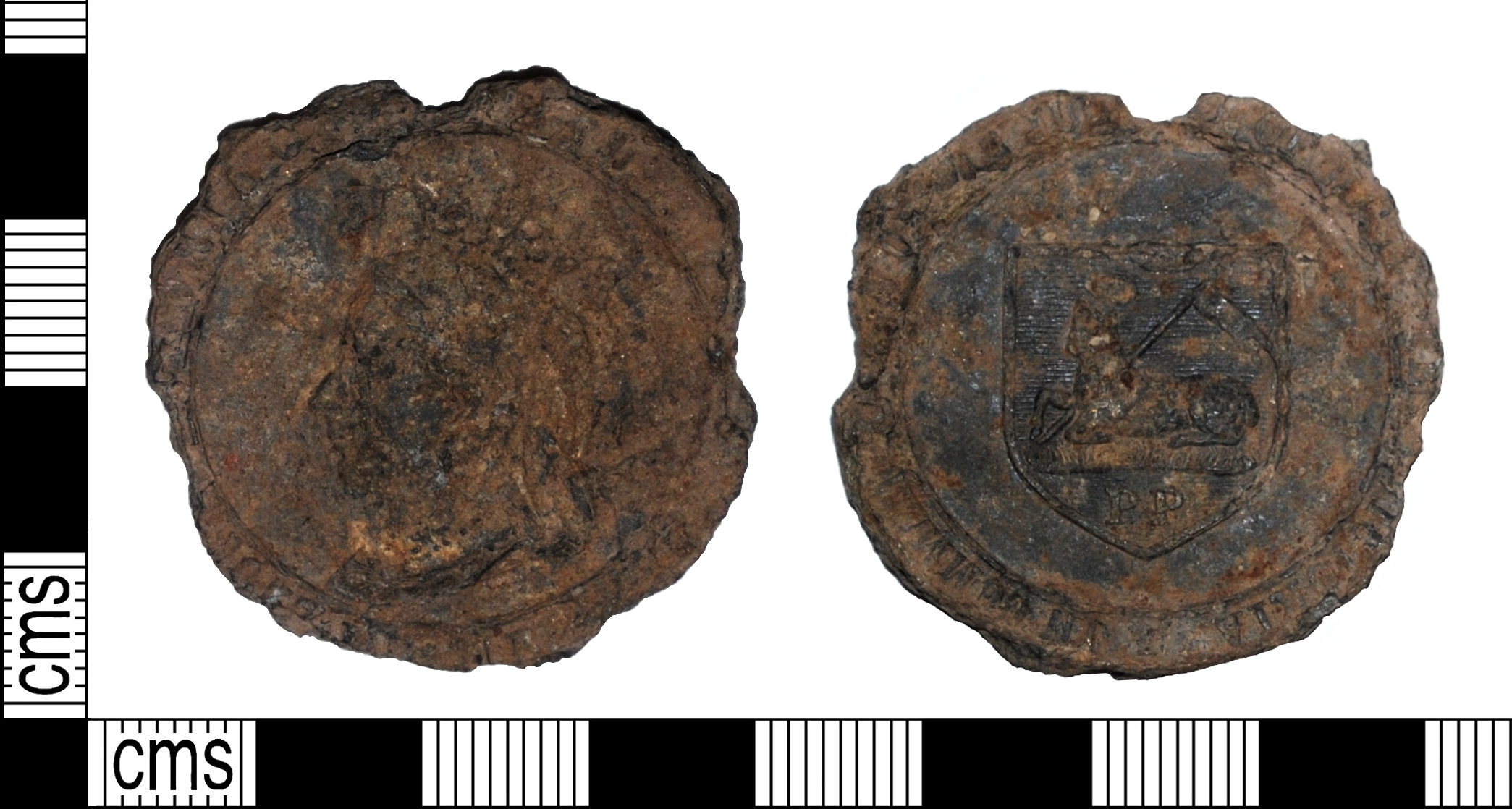
Spelter commemorative medal of Queen Victoria (1887)

Spelter, a zinc–lead alloy, ages to resemble bronze, but is softer and has a lower melting-point. The name can also refer to a copper–zinc alloy (a brass) used for brazing, or to pure zinc.

== Etymology ==
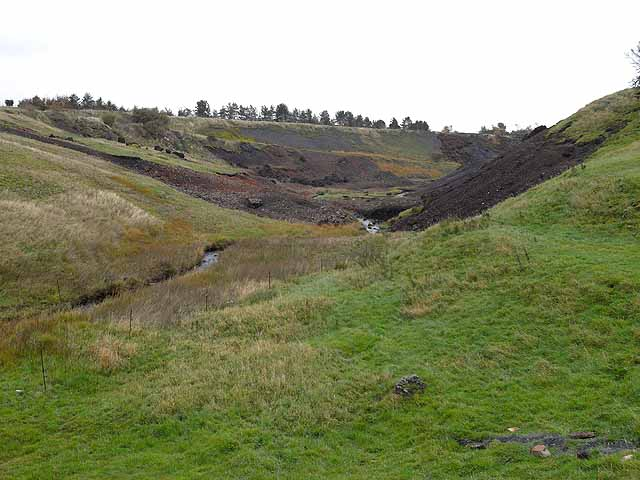
Spelter works at Tindale, Cumbria

In his etymology of the English language, 19th-century philologist Walter William Skeat speculated that the word pewter might have been derived from spelter.

== Zinc–lead spelter ==
An inexpensive alloy that is easily cast and worked, spelter was used from the 1860s in the manufacture of candlesticks, clock cases, tableware, and light fixtures. In the early 20th century, sculptors such as Jacques Limousin used spelter heavily in their manufacture of Art Nouveau and Art Deco figurines and other ornaments.

Spelter is relatively soft and brittle. It can be distinguished from bronze by scratching its patina: untarnished spelter is white, while bronze is yellow.

== The speltering process ==
Brass was made using a cementation process but this was replaced by speltering, the direct alloying of copper and zinc metal which was introduced to Europe in the 16th century.

== Other uses ==
Brasses containing zinc may be termed spelter, as may zinc ingots formed by smelting.

== See also ==
- French Bronze – Metal alloy with copper as its principal component
- Latten – Loose term for a variety of copper alloys used since the Middle Ages
- White metal – Type of decorative bright metal alloy
