= Geltsdale =

Hamlet in Cumbria, England

Coordinates: 54.876°N 2.671°W

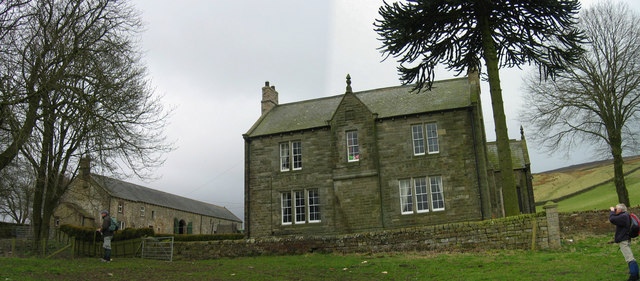
- Geltsdale House

- Location in the former Carlisle district, Cumbria Location within Cumbria
- Population: 6 (2001 census)
- OS grid reference: NY569536
- Civil parish: Castle Carrock
- Unitary authority: Cumberland
- Ceremonial county: Cumbria
- Region: North West
- Country: England
- Sovereign state: United Kingdom
- Post town: BRAMPTON
- Postcode district: CA8
- Dialling code: 01228
- Police: Cumbria
- Fire: Cumbria
- Ambulance: North West
- UK Parliament: Carlisle

Geltsdale is a hamlet and former civil parish, now in the parish of Castle Carrock, in the Cumberland district, in the ceremonial county of Cumbria, England, to the southeast of Castle Carrock village. In 2001 the parish had a population of 6. From 1858 Geltsdale was a civil parish in its own right. On 1 April 2003 the parish was abolished and merged with Castle Carrock.

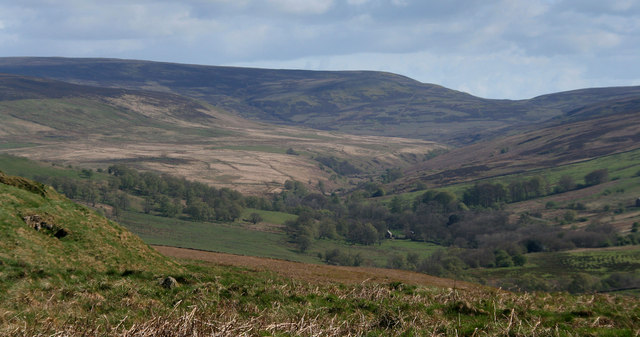
Scenery

The Geltsdale Reservoir railway ran in the vicinity.

The local landscapes are under several levels of protection. Two of the protected areas cover a large area:

- the North Pennines Area of Outstanding Natural Beauty
- the North Pennines Moors Special Protection Area (147,276 ha)

Geltsdale & Glendue Fells Site of Special Scientific Interest (SSSI) has an area of 8,059 ha, and is one of the SSSIs which underlie the SPA.

Geltsdale RSPB reserve is a 5,000 ha nature reserve within the SSSI. It mainly moorland and is managed by the Royal Society for Protection of Birds for upland birds such as black grouse and hen harrier. RSPB's acquisition of additional land in 2025 extended the site, making it their largest reserve in England.
