= Listed buildings in Farlam =

Farlam is a civil parish in the Cumberland district of Cumbria, England. It contains 13 listed buildings that are recorded in the National Heritage List for England. All the listed buildings are designated at Grade II, the lowest of the three grades, which is applied to "buildings of national importance and special interest". The parish contains the village of Farlam and the smaller settlements of Kirkhouse and Hallbankgate, and is otherwise rural. Some of the listed buildings are remnants of coal mining in the parish; these include offices later converted into houses, and a gasworks. The other listed buildings include houses, farmhouses, farm buildings, a church, memorials, and a guide post.

== Buildings ==
Name and location	Photograph	Date	Notes
Farlam Hall Cottage; 54.93289°N 2.67232°W	—	Late 16th century (probable)	Originally a bastle house, later divided into two houses, the building has thick walls in calciferous sandstone and a Welsh slate roof. There are two storeys, and each house has two bays. The left house has a two-bay lean-to extension at the front containing a door with a wooden surround, and to the right is a casement window. The right house has a doorway with a rusticated surround, sash windows in the ground floor, and gabled dormers above. In the right end wall is a blocked entrance with a chamfered surround.
New Garth; 54.93682°N 2.65692°W	—	Late 16th century	A house with thick walls and numerous later alterations. It is rendered, and has a Welsh slate roof with coped gables. There are two storeys and two bays, with a single-storey two-bay extension to the right, and a 19th-century extension at the rear. The entrance and the windows date from the 20th century.
Farlam House Farmhouse and barns 54.92141°N 2.69532°W	—	1748	A farmhouse with a row of adjoining barns, the barns dated respectively 1748, 1751 and 1820, and the farmhouse is dated 1818. The farmhouse is stuccoed, the barns are in sandstone, all have two storeys, and the roofs are slated. The house has three bays, and a doorway and sash windows with plain surrounds. Features in the barns include a large round-arched entrance, a projecting cart entrance, and doorways with dated lintels, including a re-used lintel dated 1703. (Note: Street View in November 2010 shows that the barns have been converted for residential use.)
Farlam Hall; 54.93385°N 2.67259°W	—	Mid 18th century	Originally a row of cottages, it was extended in about 1824, and further altered and extended in about 1860, becoming a country house and later a hotel. The building is stuccoed on a plinth, and has quoins and a slate roof. There are two storeys, the original building has three bays, with a three-bay extension to the right, and a five-bay extension to the rear on the left. The porch is in calciferous sandstone, with a doorway that has a pilastered surround and a moulded cornice. The windows are sashes in moulded architraves, and there are two canted bay windows.
Kirkhouse Farmhouse; 54.93132°N 2.67669°W	—	Late 18th century	The farmhouse is rendered on a chamfered plinth, with quoins and a Welsh slate roof. There are two storeys and three bays, and flanking single-storey single-bay wings with hipped roofs. The doorway has an alternate block surround and a keyed entablature. It is flanked by canted bay windows, and the windows are sash windows with plain surrounds. At the rear is a round-headed staircase window, and in the east wall is a Victorian letter box.
Low Town House; 54.92235°N 2.69466°W	—	Early 19th century	A stuccoed house on a chamfered plinth, with quoins and a Welsh slate roof. There are two storeys and three bays, and a two-bay extension to the right in sandstone. The doorway has a radial fanlight and a quoined surround, and the windows are sashes with plain surrounds.
Office Cottage; 54.93155°N 2.67656°W	—	c. 1836	Originally an office for a colliery, later a house, it is in calciferous sandstone with dressings and quoins in red sandstone, and with a hipped Welsh slate roof. The house is in a single storey with two bays, and there is a similar parallel extension at the rear. The doorway and the sash windows have rusticated surrounds and hood moulds.
Plane Head; 54.93055°N 2.66016°W	—	1836–38	Originally a colliery office, later a private house, in calciferous sandstone with rusticated quoins and a hipped Welsh slate roof. It has a single storey and two bays, with a single bay extension to the right. There is an entrance porch, and casement windows, some of which are triple, with rusticated surrounds.
Church of St Thomas a Becket; 54.93174°N 2.67475°W		1859–60	The church, designed by Anthony Salvin, is in calciferous sandstone on a chamfered plinth, with quoins and a green slate roof with coped gables. It consists of a nave with north and south porches, a north aisle, and a chancel with a south vestry. On the west gable is a double bellcote, and the windows are lancets, with a three-light east window.
Former Gasworks; 54.93278°N 2.68153°W	—	1883	A gasworks for a colliery, now disused, it is in calciferous sandstone with rusticated quoins and dressings, and a roof of Welsh slate and corrugated asbestos. It is in a single storey and has a short square tapering chimney. Adjoining is a single-storey two-bay extension and a two-storey tower with a pyramidal roof. Above the entrance is a date stone and a shaped gable.
Drinking trough memorial 54.93318°N 2.63479°W	—	1908	The drinking fountain commemorates three men who were killed in a mining accident. It is in calciferous sandstone, and consists of an open arch on a square plinth with a triangular pediment. There is a shaped bowl for horses at the base, and drinking bowl above; the fitments have been removed. There is an inscribed bronze plaque on the rear.
Guide Post; 54.92209°N 2.69511°W		1910	The guide post is in cast iron and consists of a circular column decorated with ribbing and fluting. There are two direction arms with shaped ends containing in cast letters the distances in miles to nearby villages. Also on the guide post is a trade plate containing the date.
War memorial 54.93184°N 2.67499°W	—	1920	The war memorial is in the churchyard of the Church of St Thomas a Becket. It is in granite, and consists of a Latin cross with a wreath carved in relief in the centre, on a roughly hewn plinth. This stands on another plinth with a moulded cornice with a two-tiered base. On front of the plinth is a carved scroll with an inscription and the names of those lost in the two World Wars and in the Korean War. The memorial is surrounded by a low stone kerb.

== Notes and references ==
=== Sources ===
- Historic England, "Farlam Hall Cottage, Farlam (1335566)", National Heritage List for England
- Historic England, "New Garth, Farlam (1342745)", National Heritage List for England
- Historic England, "Farlam House Farmhouse and adjoining barns, Farlam (1335603)", National Heritage List for England
- Historic England, "Farlam Hall Country House Hotel, Farlam (1077003)", National Heritage List for England
- Historic England, "Kirkhouse Farmhouse, Farlam (1087585)", National Heritage List for England
- Historic England, "Low Town House, Farlam (1087584)", National Heritage List for England
- Historic England, "Office Cottage, Farlam (1356586)", National Heritage List for England
- Historic England, "Plane Head, Farlam (1067760)", National Heritage List for England
- Historic England, "Church of St Thomas a Becket, Farlam (1335604)", National Heritage List for England
- Historic England, "Former Gasworks, Farlam (1087586)", National Heritage List for England
- Historic England, "Drinking trough memorial east of Coalfell Farm Cottage, Farlam (1087583)", National Heritage List for England
- Historic England, "Guide Post north of Farlam Farm at NGR NY 55545 58822, Farlam (1067784)", National Heritage List for England
- Historic England, "Farlam War Memorial, Farlam (1463544)", National Heritage List for England
- Historic England, Listed Buildings
- Hyde, Matthew; Pevsner, Nikolaus (2010) [1967], Cumbria, The Buildings of England, New Haven and London: Yale University Press, ISBN 978-0-300-12663-1
