= Geltsdale RSPB reserve =

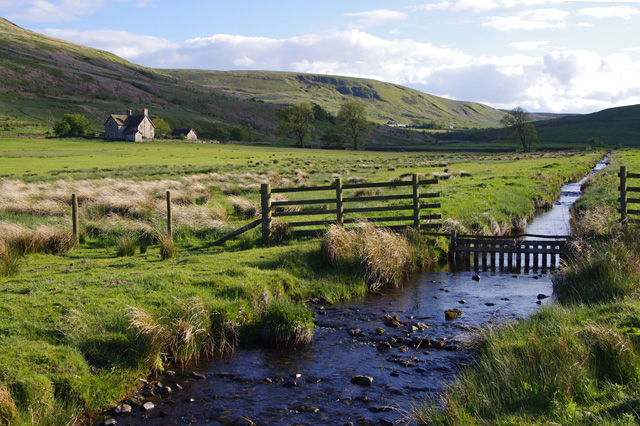
- Howgill Beck and Stagsike Cottages (visitor information point for the RSPB reserve) in 2015. Photo by Ian Taylor.
- Interactive map of Geltsdale RSPB reserve
- Location: Cumbria, England
- Coordinates: 54.91929°N 2.61621°W
- Operator: Royal Society for the Protection of Birds
- Website: https://www.rspb.org.uk/days-out/reserves/geltsdale

Geltsdale RSPB reserve is a nature reserve in Geltsdale, Cumbria, England. The Royal Society for the Protection of Birds has managed land at Geltsdale since the 1970s, protecting upland birds such as the hen harrier and black grouse. In 2025 the RSPB announced a major expansion of the reserve.

The reserve is within a Site of Special Scientific Interest (SSSI) called Geltsdale & Glendue Fells. Along with other SSSIs in the North Pennines, it is designated a Special Protection Area under the Birds Directive. The reserve is managed within the context of a commercial hill farm.

== Birdlife and habitats ==
The hen harrier is a bird of open habitats such as heather moorland, a type of vegetation which is typical of the reserve. Although such habitats are common in the uplands of England, the bird is scarce, being illegally persecuted as a predator of red grouse. In 2013, hen harriers failed to breed successfully in England for the first time in almost half a century.

The black grouse requires a more varied habitat than the hen harrier and the RSPB has planted many trees at Geltsdale. The amount of fencing has been reduced because the birds tend to collide with fences.

In 2016 a hen harrier chick fledged at the reserve. Named Bonny, he was one of only seven such chicks to fledge that year in England. Bonny was satellite tagged as part of a project funded by the European Union's LIFE Programme, "Conserving the hen harrier (Circus cyaneus) in northern England and southern and eastern Scotland" (LIFE13 NAT/UK/000258). Information was no longer transmitted from the tag after 14 December 2016 and he was assumed to have died.

In 2021 four chicks fledged from a nest at Geltsdale. The adults had been supported by a feeding programme designed to reduce the distances they had to travel from the nest. 2024 was the most successful breeding season for hen harriers at Geltsdale since the 1990s, with two pairs fledging a total of eight chicks.

Another bird of interest is the curlew, which since 2020 has been supported in this part of northern England by a project funded by the European Union's LIFE programme. Howgill Beck, a stream which runs through the reserve, has "rewiggled" to attract wildlife such as waders.

== Facilities ==
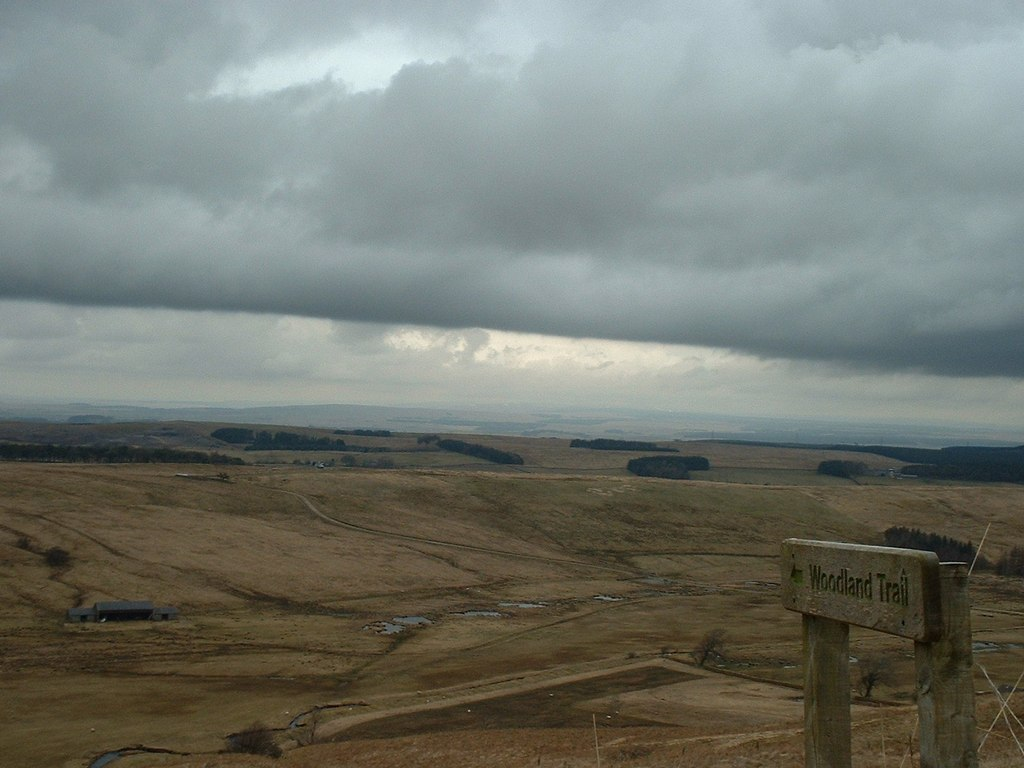
Woodland Trail in the growing

There is free entry to the reserve. There is a visitor information point.

There are waymarked trails leading from the car park at Howgill:

- The Bruthwaite trail is 1.8 miles. There is a viewpoint at an altitude of 1,500 feet at Bruthwaite.
- the Stagsike Trail covers 2.8 miles

== Notes ==
1. North Pennines AONB
2. Geltsdale & Glendue Fells
