= Geltsdale Reservoir railway =

UK railway company

Coordinates: 54°52′43″N 2°42′50″W

Overview
- Headquarters: Carlisle
- Locale: England
- Dates of operation: 1904–1909

Technical
- Track gauge: 3 ft (914 mm)

The Geltsdale Reservoir railway was a 3 ft (914 mm) narrow gauge industrial railway used during the construction of Castle Carrock Reservoir near Carlisle in Cumbria.

== Locomotives ==
Name	Builder	Type	Date	Works number	Notes
Kuroki	Hudswell Clarke	0-4-0ST	1904	718	Supplied new to William Kennedy Ltd. the first contractors on the reservoir project. Left in 1906
Swansea	Peckett and Sons	0-4-0ST	1902	959	ex-Swansea Corporation; owned by Harold, Arnold & Son, contractors.
	W.G. Bagnall	0-4-0ST	1902	1704(?)	May be ex-Swansea Corporation; owned by Harold, Arnold & Son, contractors.

== See also ==
- British industrial narrow gauge railways
