= Geltsdale & Glendue Fells =

Site of Special Scientific Interest in England

Coordinates: 54°53′N 2°36′W

- Site of Special Scientific Interest
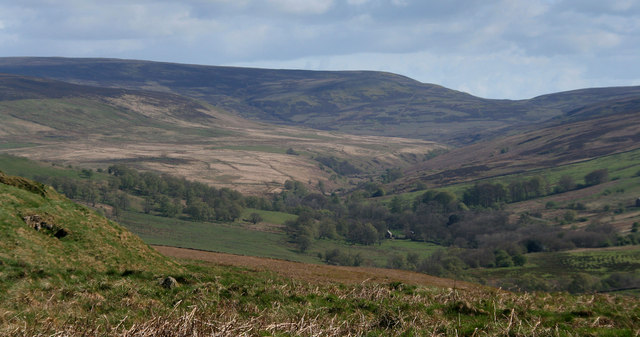
- Looking up Geltsdale
- Location of Geltsdale & Glendue Fells.
- Interest: Biological
- Notification date: 1984

Geltsdale & Glendue Fells is a Site of Special Scientific Interest in the North Pennines, England. The site has an area of 8,059 hectares (19,910 acres), partly in Cumbria and partly in Northumberland.

== Etymology ==
Eilert Ekwall judged that the name Glendue comes from the now dead Cumbric language, comprising the words found in modern Welsh as glyn 'valley' and du 'black', with Victor Watts adding that 'Glendue is one of the narrowest and darkest valleys in S Tyndale'. Although it has been noted that name could come from the equivalent Scottish Gaelic words, scholars view the Cumbric etymology as more likely.

== Birdlife ==
It is noted for its ornithological interest and the greater part of the area is managed as a RSPB reserve for upland birds. It is one of a group of SSSIs underlying the North Pennines Moors Special Protection Area, which was designated in 2001 under the Birds Directive.

== See also ==
- Geltsdale RSPB reserve
