= Brampton railway station (Cumbria) =

Railway station in Cumbria, England

Brampton Brampton (Cumbria)
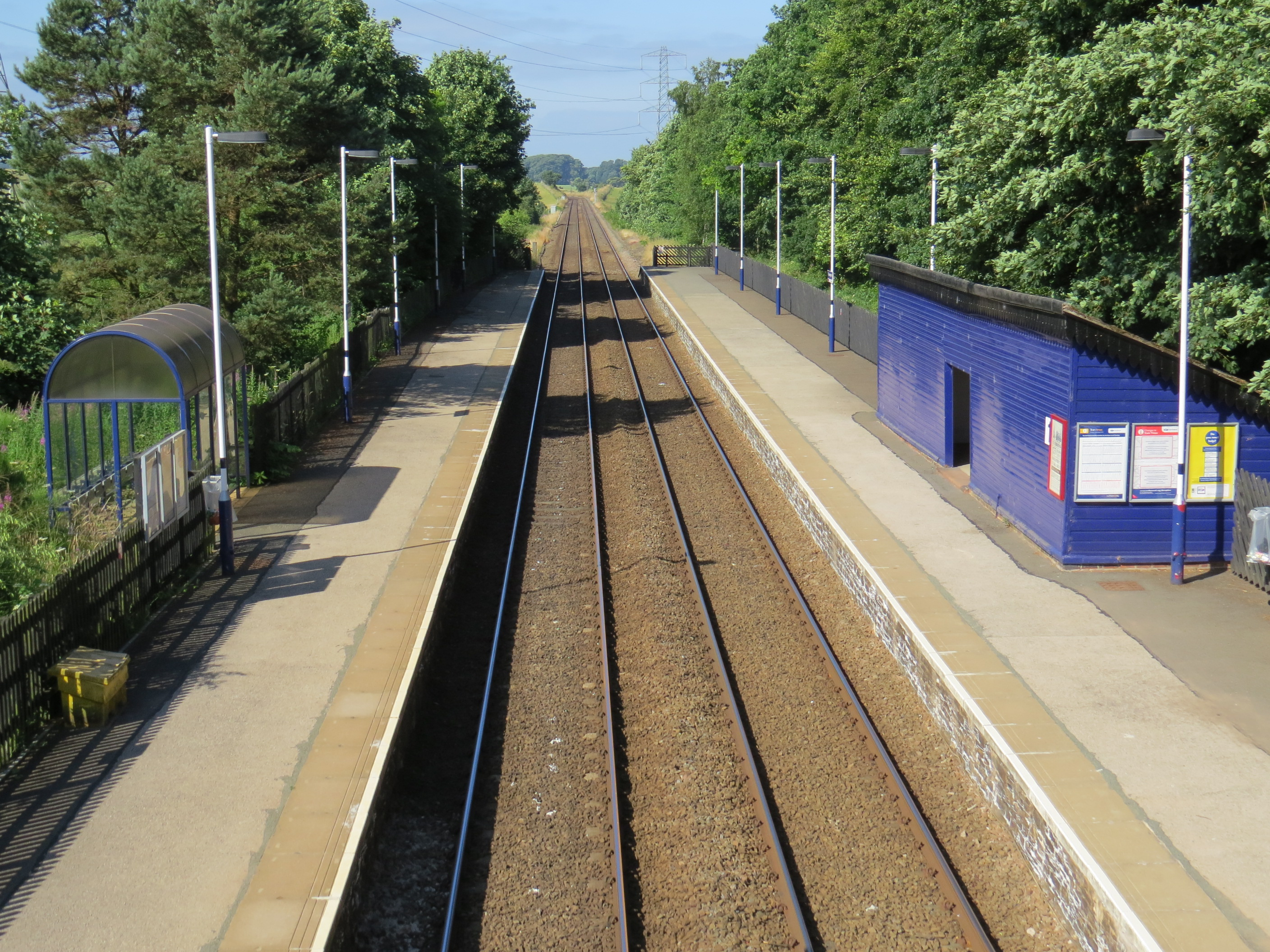

General information
- Location: Brampton, Cumberland; England
- Coordinates: 54°55′56″N 2°42′14″W
- Grid reference: NY550599
- Owner: Network Rail
- Manager: Northern Trains
- Platforms: 2
- Tracks: 2

Other information
- Station code: BMP
- Classification: DfT category F2

History
- Original company: Newcastle and Carlisle Railway
- Pre-grouping: North Eastern Railway
- Post-grouping: London and North Eastern Railway; British Rail (North Eastern Region)

Key dates
- 20 July 1836: Opened as Milton for Brampton
- 1 September 1870: Renamed Brampton
- 1 May 1885: Renamed Brampton Junction
- 1 November 1891: Renamed Brampton
- 1 August 1913: Renamed Brampton Junction
- 18 March 1971: Renamed Brampton (Cumberland)
- 14 May 1984: Renamed Brampton (Cumbria)

Passengers
- 2021/22: ▲11,956
- 2022/23: ▼9,960
- 2023/24: ▲13,710
- 2024/25: ▲15,976
- 2025/26: ▲25,780
Location
- Location within Cumbria
Notes
- Passenger statistics from the Office of Rail and Road

Brampton (Cumbria) is a railway station on the Tyne Valley Line, which runs between Newcastle and Carlisle via Hexham. The station, situated 10 miles 62 chains (10.8 mi; 17.3 km) east of Carlisle, serves the hamlet of Milton and the town of Brampton, Cumberland in Cumbria, England. It is owned by Network Rail and managed by Northern Trains.

== History ==
The Newcastle and Carlisle Railway was formed in 1829, and was opened in stages. The station was opened in July 1836, following the opening of the Newcastle and Carlisle Railway between Greenhead and Carlisle London Road.

Upon opening, the station was called Milton, or possibly, Milton for Brampton. According to Quick (2022), the station has since been renamed several times. Nowadays, the station is commonly suffixed as Brampton (Cumbria), in order to distinguish it from the station of the same name in Suffolk.

Brampton operated as a junction station from opening in 1836, linking with a short branch line, the Brampton Railway, known locally as The Dandy. The line, which was initially horse-drawn, ran into the town, terminating at Brampton Town. This short branch line was taken over by the North Eastern Railway in 1912, with the track relaid and locomotive operated services resuming from August 1913, with a break from 1917 to 1920. The line was closed in 1923, with most of the former route now serving as a public footpath.

The station was also the junction of another railway serving the local collieries owned by the Earl of Carlisle. Known as Lord Carlisle's Railway, this ran to a junction with the Alston Line at Lambley. This mineral railway closed in March 1953.

The first Station Master at Brampton was Thomas Edmondson, who introduced cardboard tickets and later developed the ticket dating machine.

The station was host to a camping coach from 1935 to 1939 – one of 119 vehicles converted by the London and North Eastern Railway between 1933 and 1938.

Brampton was reduced to an unstaffed halt in 1967, along with most of the other stations on the line that escaped the Beeching Axe. The former station buildings were subsequently demolished in stages during the 1970s and 1980s.

== Facilities ==
The station has two platforms, both of which have a ticket machine (which accepts card or contactless payment only), seating, waiting shelter, next train audio and visual displays and an emergency help point. There is step-free access to both platforms, however the Carlisle-bound platform is not fully accessible from the station's car park. Both platforms are also linked by a pre-grouping metal footbridge, similar to those at Haltwhistle and Wetheral. There is a small car park at the station.

Brampton (Cumbria) is part of the Northern Trains penalty fare network, meaning that a valid ticket or promise to pay notice is required prior to boarding the train.

== Services ==
As of the December 2025 timetable change, an hourly service operates all week (including Sundays) to Carlisle and Newcastle. All services are operated by Northern Trains.

Rolling stock used: Class 156 Super Sprinter and Class 158 Express Sprinter

Preceding station	National Rail	Following station
Haltwhistle towards Newcastle	Northern Trains; Tyne Valley Line	Wetheral towards Carlisle
	Historical railways	
Naworth	North Eastern Railway; Newcastle and Carlisle Railway	How Mill
	Disused railways	
Brampton Town	Brampton Railway; Brampton Town branch line	Terminus

== Sources ==
- Farr, Michael G.D. (1997). "Edmondson, Thomas". In Simmons, Jack; Biddle, Gordon (eds.). The Oxford Companion to British Railway History From 1603 to the 1990s (1st ed.). Oxford: Oxford University Press. p. 141. ISBN 0-19-211697-5.
- Hoole, K. (1986). The North East. A Regional History of the Railways of Great Britain. Vol. 4 (3rd ed.). Newton Abbott: David St John Thomas. ISBN 0946537313.
- McRae, Andrew (1997). British Railway Camping Coach Holidays: The 1930s & British Railways (London Midland Region). Vol. Scenes from the Past: 30 (Part One). Foxline. ISBN 1-870119-48-7.
- Quick, Michael (2022) [2001]. Railway passenger stations in Great Britain: a chronology (PDF). version 5.04. Railway & Canal Historical Society. Archived from the original (PDF) on 25 November 2022.
