= Cumberland Coalfield =

Coalfield in Cumbria, England

Coordinates: 54.6387°N 3.4760°W

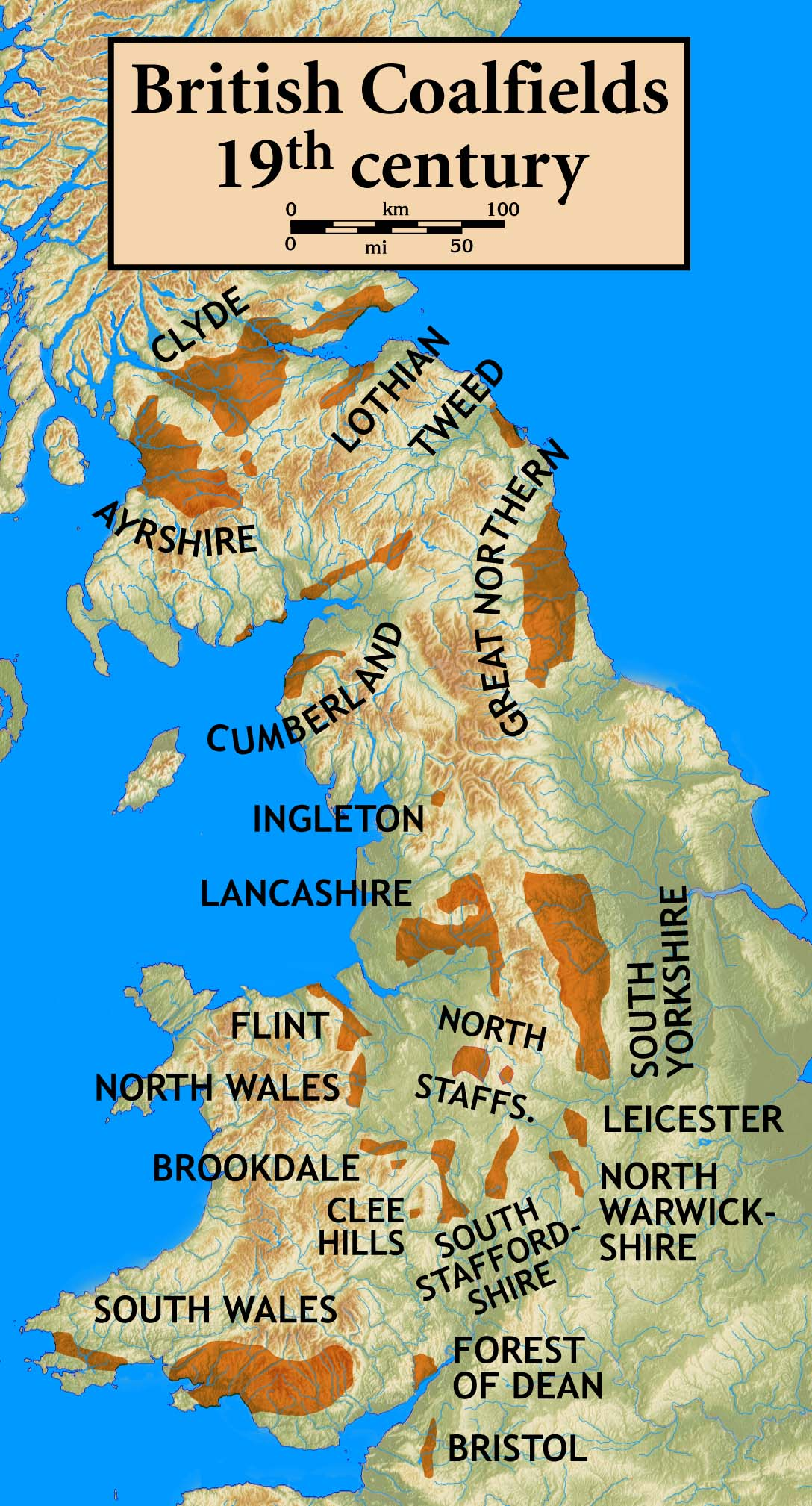

The Cumberland Coalfield is a coalfield in Cumbria, north-west England. It extends from Whitehaven in the south to Maryport and Aspatria in the north.

== Geology ==
The following coal seams occur within the Coal Measures Group in this coalfield. Not all seams are present in any one part of the coalfield:

Middle Coal Measures Formation

- (series of unnamed coals)
- Brassy
- Black Metal
- Fireclay
- White Metal
- Little
- Slaty
- Tenquarters
- Rattler
- Bannock Band
- Main Band
- Lower Metal
- Yard Cannel Band
- Yard
- Lower Yard

There is also a Crow seam between the Metal and Bannock seams.

Lower Coal Measures Formation

- Half Yard
- Two Foot
- Little Main
- Eighteen Inch
- Lickbank
- Sixquarters
- Parrot
- Upper Threequarters Rider
- Upper Threequarters
- Lower Threequarters
- Upper Albrighton
- Middle Albrighton
- Lower Albrighton
- Harrington Four Foot

Towards the top of the underlying Stainmore Formation (or Hensingham Formation), which is of Namurian age, are the:

- Udale Coal
- Bedlam Gill Coal
- (unnamed coals)

== See also ==
- Cumberland Miners' Association
