= Farlam =

Village and civil parish in Cumbria, England

Coordinates: 54.922°N 2.695°W

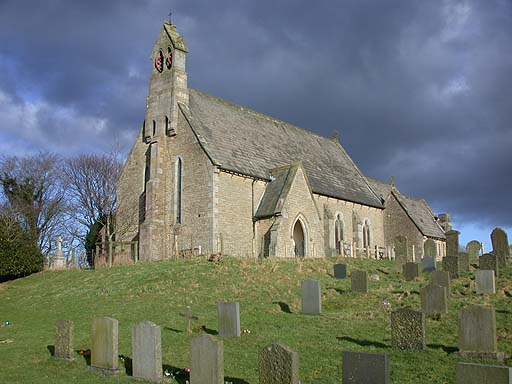
- Church of St Thomas a Becket, Farlam

- Location within Cumbria
- Population: 659 (2021)
- OS grid reference: NY5620258218
  - London: 259 Miles
- Civil parish: Farlam
- Unitary authority: Cumberland
- Ceremonial county: Cumbria
- Region: North West
- Country: England
- Sovereign state: United Kingdom
- Post town: Brampton
- Postcode district: CA8
- Dialling code: 016977
- Police: Cumbria
- Fire: Cumbria
- Ambulance: North West
- UK Parliament: Carlisle

Farlam is a village and civil parish in the Cumberland district, in the English county of Cumbria. The village is about 2 1/4 miles (3.6 km) southeast of the small town of Brampton and 9 1/2 miles (15 km) east of the city of Carlisle. While the population has fluctuated over time, in the 2001 UK Census, the population stood at 590. The 2011 Census showed a population of 669, decreasing to 659 in 2021.

== Toponymy ==
The name Farlam is thought to originate from the Old English fearn and hām, the latter meaning village or village community, translating to a 'Ferny-clearing homestead/village' or perhaps, 'hemmed-in land by a ferny clearing'.

The parish also once contained a settlement called Clesketts, first attested around 1254 as Claschet, noted for being one of a fairly small number of English place-names deriving from Common Brittonic. In this case the name comes from the words that survive in modern Welsh as clas ("settlement, monastery") and coed ("wood").

== History ==
=== Origins ===
Farlam was originally divided into two townships, East Farlam and West Farlam, with a combined population in 1811 of 672 inhabitants and 115 houses. Hallbankgate and Kirkhouse were two hamlets located within the township of East Farlam, the former four miles south east of Brampton, and the latter, where the church stands, half-a-mile east of the village. Milton was a small village in West Farlam and is now in Brampton parish. The whole parish has a high elevation and topographically is quite hilly with an area in 1847 of 5,680 acres.

=== Population ===
The UK national census recorded that in 1881, the total population for the parish peaked at 1585, which (with the exception of 1821 where it decreased from 672 to 663) had been growing steadily year on year, since records began in 1801. After 1881 there was a large drop in population which is shown in the 1961 census, where the population had decreased from 1581 to 670.

Population growth in Farlam since 1801

Year	Pop.	±%
1801	592	—
1811	672	+13.5%
1821	663	−1.3%
1831	816	+23.1%

Year	Pop.	±%
1841	1,035	+26.8%
1851	1,146	+10.7%
1881	1,585	+38.3%
1891	1,502	−5.2%

Year	Pop.	±%
1901	1,365	−9.1%
1911	1,022	−25.1%
1921	1,034	+1.2%
1931	961	−7.1%

Year	Pop.	±%
1951	791	−17.7%
1961	670	−15.3%

=== Occupation ===
Both coal and limestone where found within Farlam and as such limestone was quarried and in 1552 coal was bored for in Greenside Rigg within the parish.. The 1881 census shows that the majority of men within the village were involved in the mining and quarrying of both the coal and limestone with 257 men being listed as workers in various mineral substances. However the picture of the women occupations is less clear with the majority (232) being listed as persons without specific occupations. Due to Farlam being a mining village jobs may have been very limited to mining, an occupation not performed by the women and as such simply had no occupation through lack of job availability.

Occupation Data from 1881 Census
Occupation Group	Male	Female
Professionals	12	5
Domestic Service or Offices	6	59
Commercial Occupations	6	1
Transport & Communications	20	–
Agriculture	56	4
Animals	3	–
Workers in Machines & Implements	10	–
Workers in House, Furniture & Decorations	15	–
Workers in Carriages & Harnesses	4	–
Workers in Chemicals & Compounds	1	–
Workers in Food & Lodging	14	–
Workers in Textiles Fabrics	5	–
Workers in Dress	14	21
Workers in Various Vegetable Substances	4	–
Workers in Various Mineral Substances	257	1
Workers in General or Unspecified Commodities	39	–
Persons without Specified Occupations	9	232
Unknown Occupation	4	105

=== Housing ===
Over time, the total number of houses in Farlam has fluctuated. Between 1831 and 1901, the total number of houses increased steadily from 134 to 294. However, in 1921 the total number of houses decreased to 230 and rose again to 247 in 1931 before falling to 230 in 1961. The most recent data from the 2001 UK Census showed that there were 265 houses.

Year of census	Total Houses
1831	134
1841	189
1851	210
1881	279
1891	286
1901	294
1921	230
1931	247
1951	244
1961	230

== Church ==
Farlam has boasted a church as early as 1169, but the current church was erected in 1860. The old church was given by Robert de Vallibus to Lanercost priory but after the dissolution along with all of the possessions of the priory, was granted to Sir Thomas Dacre, and is now in the patronage and impropriation of the Earl of Carlisle.

The current church is dedicated to St. Thomas a Becket and is a plain stone building in the early English style and was constructed for a cost of £2,000 back in 1860 which in today's money would have cost £86,320. The building consists of a nave, chancel and only one aisle with for accommodation for 400 worshippers. It occupies a site near the old church adjoining the hamlet of Kirkhouse. The land on which it stands was contributed by the Hon. Charles Howard as well as £500 towards its construction, Mrs Maria Thompson also contributed £200, a new organ for the church and erected the pictorial east window. The Ecclesiastical Commissioners granted £200, and the parishioners also contributed a large unknown sum of money towards the cost of erection.

=== Parish records ===
The parish registers of St Thomas à Becket, Farlam begin in 1663, recording baptisms, marriages, and burials. Bishop’s Transcripts survive from 1665, providing additional coverage where the original volumes have gaps. From 1754, separate registers were maintained for marriages and banns in line with Hardwicke’s Marriage Act. The records document the local community through centuries of agricultural and later industrial development, with many families appearing across multiple generations. Original registers are deposited at Cumbria Archives, Carlisle, with images and indexes available via FamilySearch and other genealogical services.

== See also ==
- Listed buildings in Farlam
