= Halton Lea Gate =

- Village
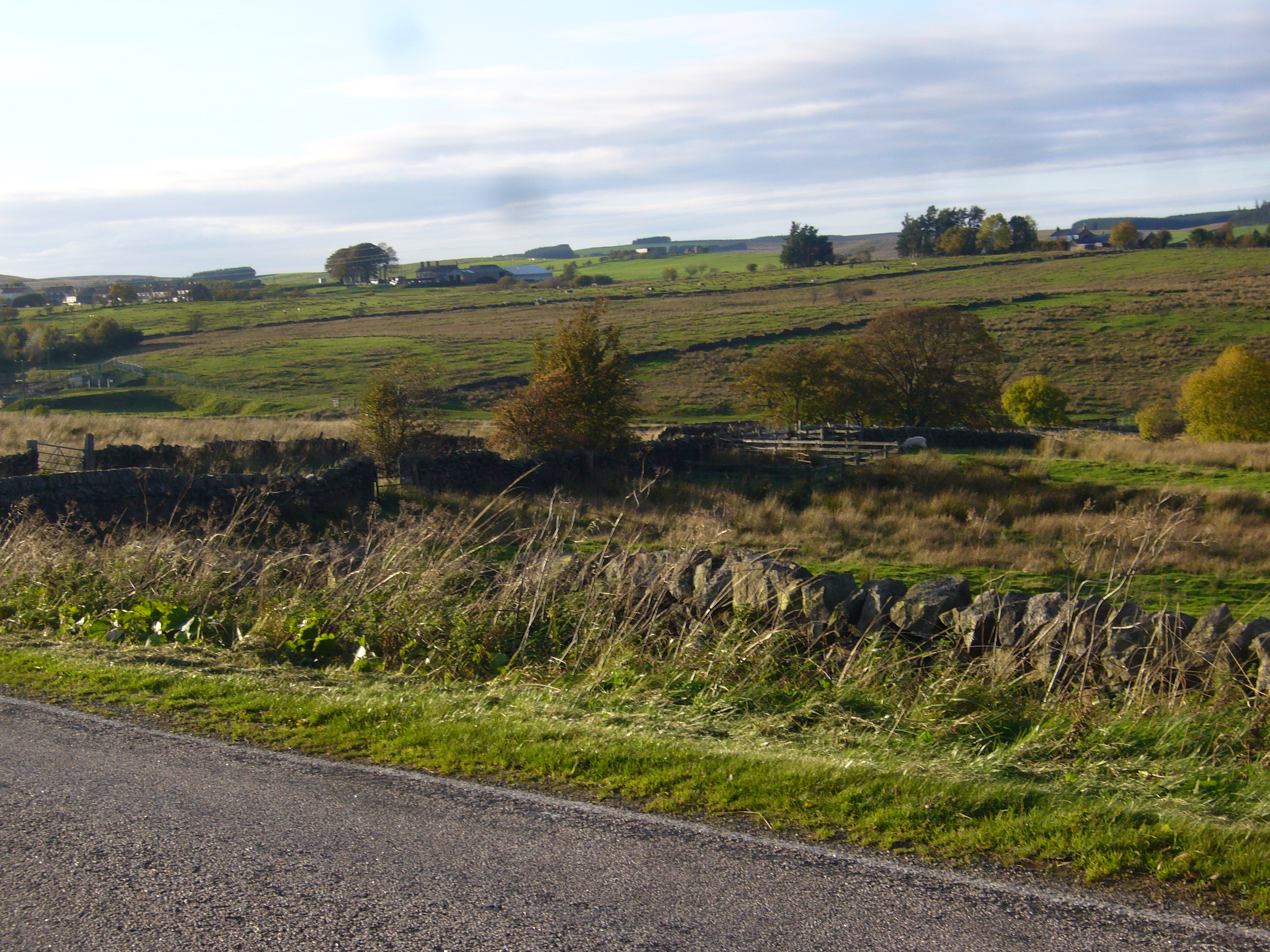
- Part of Halton Lea Gate as viewed from the A689 road in October 2013.
- Interactive map of Halton Lea Gate
- Coordinates: 54.921°N 2.544°W
- Country: United Kingdom
- County: Northumberland
- Parish: Hartleyburn

Population (1901)
  - Total: 310

Halton Lea Gate is a small village in Northumberland, England, on the A689 road close to the boundary of the counties of Northumberland and Cumbria. The village is part of the parish council area called Hartleyburn, and borders the North Pennines Area of Outstanding Natural Beauty (AONB). Halton Lea Farm has a Grade II listed farmhouse, the eastern end of which probably represents a large bastle. The Pennine Way long-distance footpath runs just to the east of the village.

The population of Halton Lea Gate was 310 in 1901. The area was subject to extensive coal mining activity in the nineteenth century, with a later phase of mining being undertaken from the 1930s to 1958.

== Coal mining controversy ==
The area has featured in the national news on account of plans to develop open cast coal mining adjacent to the village. A plan submitted in 2008 led to speculation in the local media that property values would drop by 40% as a result. The plan submitted by HM Project Developments Ltd in November 2010 was to extract approximately 140,000 tonnes of coal; with the nearest housing to the mining extraction being just under 60 metres away. In May 2012 the UK government Planning Inspector, Clive Sproule, held an inquiry into this proposal, after the County Council had rejected applications to develop the site. The inquiry sat for nine days between 15–31 May. On 7 August the Planning Inspector published his decision. The appeal by HM Project Developments Ltd against the decision of the Northumberland County Council was allowed provided a schedule of conditions could be met. A notable person absent from the inquiry was Dr Dick van Steenis, a retired GP, whose presence at other inquiries to give evidence of the link between open cast mining and reduced life expectation and other health problems, had previously led to the blocking of many open-cast mines. Hartleyburn Parish Council then sought a judicial review of the Planning Inspector's decision. Hartleyburn Parish Council's challenge to the Inspector's decision was dismissed by Judge Brehens sitting in the High Court in Leeds. Following the Planning Inspector's decision, an amended application was submitted by HM Project Developments Ltd to Northumberland County Council. This application was recommended for acceptance by the County Council Planning Case Officer and was approved by the Planning and Environment Committee of the County Council on 7 January 2014. Extraction of coal commenced in 2016.

The success of the application to open cast coal mine at Halton Lea Gate has opened up the possibility of further mining applications in places like Lambley and Coanwood, where applications have previously been refused. The current National Planning Policy Framework allows national interest to overrule local decisions in respect of mineral resources.
