= Brampton Railway =

Railway line in northern England

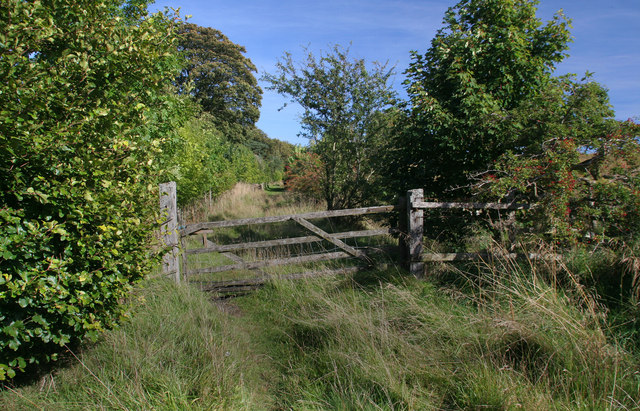
Trackbed of the old Brampton Railway near Tindale

The Brampton Railway was a mineral railway built in 1798 to bring coal from workings on Tindale Fell to staiths at Brampton. It was a development of short sections of earlier wooden railways.

When the Newcastle and Carlisle Railway was opened in 1836, the Brampton Railway was diverted to make a junction with that line. The section from the junction to Brampton was later transferred to the North Eastern Railway, carrying passengers and goods, but it closed in 1923.

The remainder became dedicated to serving collieries and other mineral workings, and was successively extended in the remote hills south of Brampton. It flourished when the collieries did well, but after nationalisation of the pits in 1947 steep decline set in and the line closed in 1953.

The line has been known by a number of names during its existence, including the Tindale Fell Railway, the Midgeholme Railway, the Hartleyburn & Brampton Railway, and simply the Brampton Railway.

== Earliest times ==
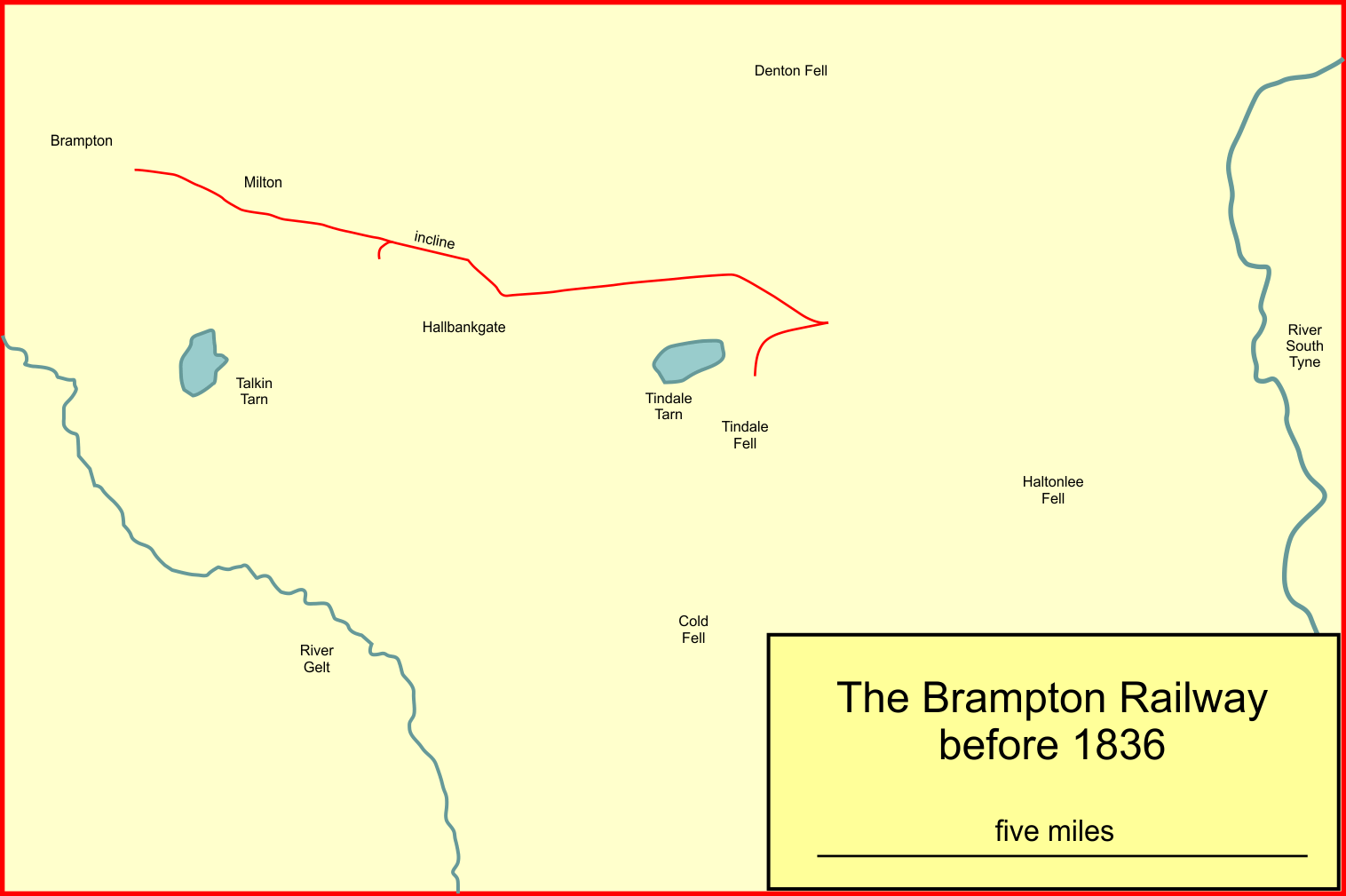
The first line of the Brampton railway

The East Cumberland coalfield was one of the earliest in Britain to be worked, probably from Roman times. In the seventeenth century and subsequently the Earls of Carlisle developed the workings, and it appears that by 1775 wooden railways were in use on Tindale Fell for short-distance movement of small wagons.

Dendy Marshall (1971) explains:

A railway of 5½ miles in length was made in 1775, from the Earl of Carlisle's colliery at Tindale Fell to Brampton. It was the scene of an early experiment with wrought iron rails, in about the year 1808. It was originally laid with cast iron fish-bellied rails. Moore says that boring for coal on Tindale Fell... was in progress in 1628. In 1769 the Earl of Carlisle was carrying on Tarnhouse or Tindale Fell colliery, beside the Talkin and Midgeholme collieries. The railway along which the coals were conveyed by horses in chaldron waggons, did not take the same route exactly, nor was it so long as the existing [i.e. later] railway, which begins at Brampton, and terminates at Lambley station on the Alston branch of the NER.

Lee disagrees with this account:

Mr. Dendy Marshall ... quotes no authority for the assertion, and the present writer’s researches tend strongly to indicate that the line through to Brampton was built more than two decades later. There were probably wooden wagonways at Tindale Fell colliery as early as 1775, but it seems clear that the through line to Brampton was built by the Earl of Carlisle about 1798.

A through line to Brampton was constructed in 1798, reaching the staithes there, and the first wagon of coal was brought down from Tindale Fell colliery in April 1799. The waggonway, five and a half miles in length, was constructed in timber, and the wagons were hauled singly by horses.

Thompson wrote (in 1900): "I doubt if anyone now living can say accurately when this tram road was made; it is marked on old maps as far back I believe as 1774, and was probably in existence long before that.

The timber track was soon replaced by cast iron fish-bellied rails on stone block sleepers, and in 1808 the track was again relaid, about two-thirds of the extent with rolled wrought iron rails and the remainder with cast iron. The line was famous for its early introduction of the new material. "[Wrought iron in edge rails] was first used by itself, without a wooden rail below it, in a humble way at Tindale Fell near Brampton in 1808 and at Walbottle about the same time."

The earliest wrought iron rails had been prone to lamination, but an exchange of newspaper correspondence on the subject produced a robust statement from John Birkinshaw, of the Bedlington Iron Works. Quoting a letter from James Thompson ("the Colliery Agent of the Earl of Carlisle") he says that "apprehensions of lamination and exfoliation are entirely groundless. Thompson's letter of 7 December 1824 is reproduced, saying:

... having under my care a Rail-way, whereon several Miles both of Cast and Wrought Iron Rails are used, I have sent you herewith a Piece of the latter, which has been laid sixteen Years, and certainly has no Appearance of Lamination... The whole of the Wrought Iron, which has been used from 12 to 16 years, appears to be very little worse. The Cast Iron is certainly much worse, and subject to considerable Breakage, although the Rails are about double the Weight of the Malleable Iron Rails.

In 1808, James Thompson, then fourteen years of age, was employed assisting William Lawson, the agent of the Earl of Carlisle and in 1819 he succeeded Lawson as agent. He sank a new colliery at Blacksyke about 1820 and in 1824 another pit, at Midgeholme. The railway was extended east from Tindale Fell to the Midgeholme pithead, and a branch of three miles was laid to Blacksyke, with a spur to serve a limestone quarry. Considerable earthworks were required to build the new line to a satisfactory gradient.

== Connecting to the Newcastle and Carlisle Railway ==
For decades there had been consideration of linking Newcastle and Carlisle, representing the North Sea and the Solway Firth, by some improved means of transport. A canal had been the preferred solution for some time, and after 1823 a branch canal to Kirkhouse was proposed, to connect with the waggonways.

It was a railway that was authorised by Parliament on 22 May 1829, when the Newcastle and Carlisle Railway Act was passed. The route to be taken by the line had been controversial, and the Earl of Carlisle had insisted on alterations to the route to protect his interests, including his near-monopoly of coal extraction in the area.

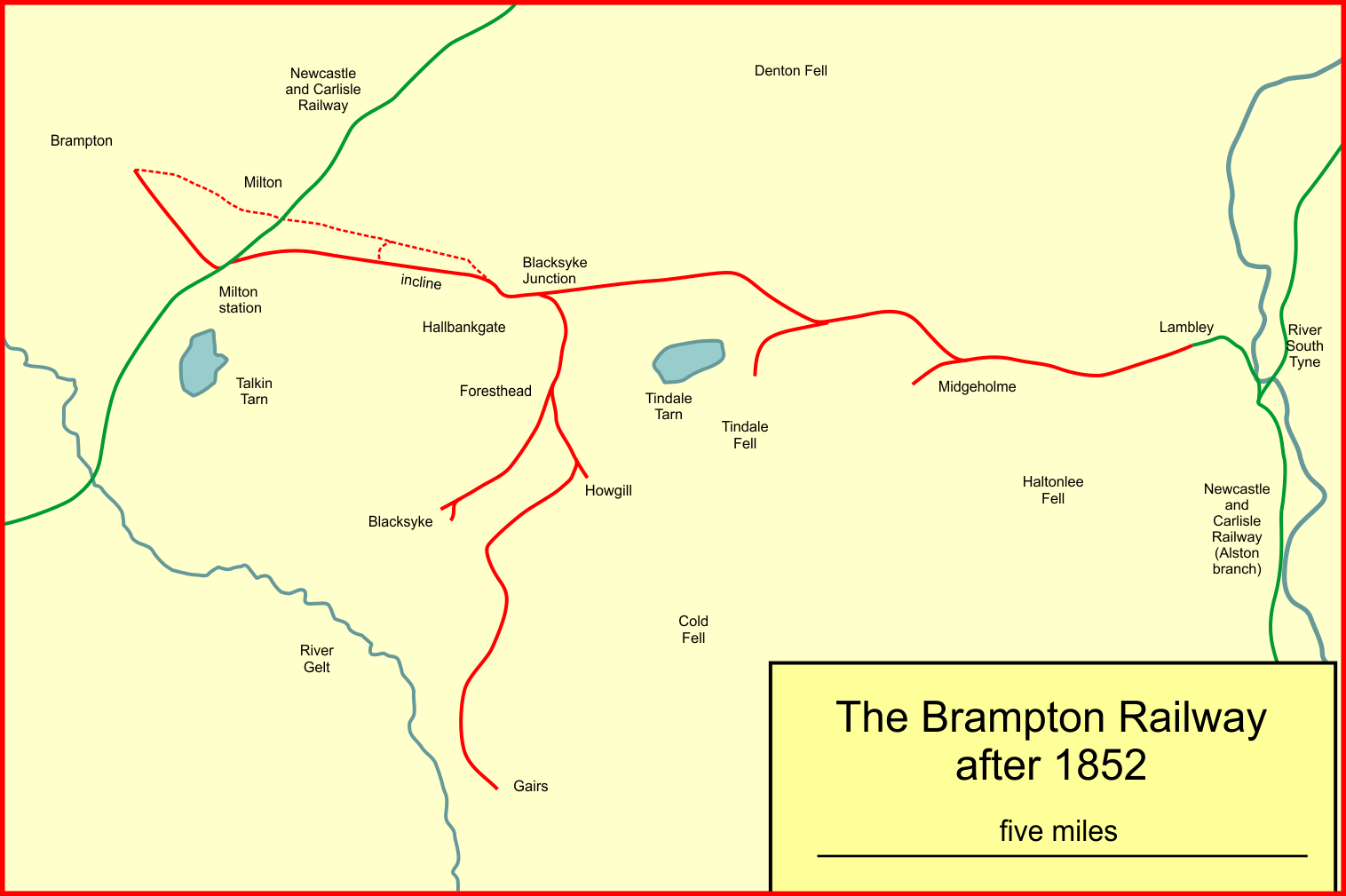
The Brampton Railway after 1852

The new railway was to intersect his waggonway at an inconvenient location, and it was agreed that the waggonway would be diverted, crossing the Newcastle and Carlisle line at Milton on the level. (Priestley reported that "At thirteen miles from Carlisle the line crosses a private colliery railway belonging to the Earl of Carlisle." The opportunity was taken to modernise the technology of the waggonway as well. The Newcastle and Carlisle Railway opened on 19 July 1836, although the Earl of Carlisle's mineral traffic had already been running for a short time (since 13 July), from Milton to Carlisle. In those few days his traffic had used gravitation from Milton down to Carlisle, the horses riding in dandy carts, and hauling the empty wagons back.

In fact the inclined plane was nearly a mile long with gradients varying from 1 in 22 to 1 in 17½. A wire rope ran the length of the plane supported on rollers, and passed round a drum at the top; it operated on the balanced principle so that full wagons attached at the top drew up empties from the lower level.

The 13 July opening of the Earl of Carlisle's line was a celebratory occasion, and the Earl of Carlisle's two locomotives Gilsland and Atlas worked trains from Kirkhouse to Brampton and back. A regular passenger service was then operated from Milton station to Brampton by horse traction. A steep downward gradient on a portion of the line allowed the horse to ride at the rear of the passenger vehicle. (Note: The train from Kirkhouse was a gala event but did not represent the beginning of a regular passenger service, and Kirkhouse was never a passenger station in the ordinary sense. Joy says "Thompson [operated] the Lake Counties' first steam-hauled passenger service between Kirkhouse and Brampton" but this does not imply a regular service, but simply one out and back excursion.)

The horse-drawn passenger coach was referred to as the Dandy. It met all the trains on the main line at Milton between 8 am and 7 pm on weekdays giving a connection to Brampton.

W. B. Thompson described the working:

The present line falls with a very severe gradient towards the town of Brampton, and the practice used to be to allow the wagons full of coal to run down by gravity, and then, when the load had been discharged, to draw them back empty by horses. There was not a sufficient number of horses employed to deal with the whole of the traffic, so that a gradual accumulation of wagons at the Brampton terminus took place, and when the sidings were full a locomotive was sent down to clear the empties all away.

It is perhaps worth adding that in spite of the absence of signals, continuous brakes, interlocking, and all other precautions dear to the Board of Trade, the passenger traffic was carried on all those years practically without an accident of any kind, the only case in which I can recall a passenger having received injury being one in which the injury was entirely attributable to his own negligence.

== Leased to Thompson ==
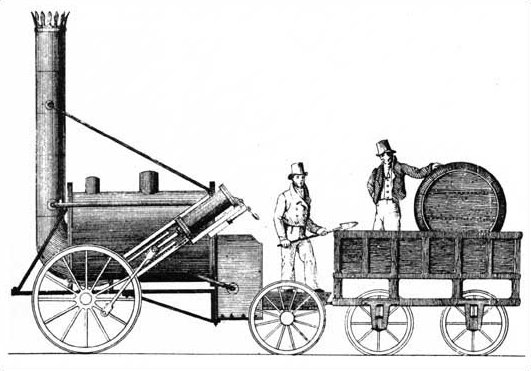
Stephenson's Rocket

Early in 1837 James Thompson leased the collieries, limeworks and waggonway from the Earl of Carlisle, and the latter took no further managerial interest in them; Thompson formed the firm of Thompson and Sons of Kirkhouse. In April 1837 Thompson acquired the Rocket, the famous locomotive of the Rainhill Trials that had been designed by Robert Stephenson. He paid the Liverpool and Manchester Railway £300 for it. Rocket was acquired to operate mineral trains, but was too light for the purpose and was laid aside in 1840. (Note: The driving wheels had wooden spokes. A photograph in Charters shows the locomotive with wooden infill between the spokes, suggesting that in heavy haul conditions the spokes were inadequate to transmit the traction forces.)

Thompson's firm built locomotives from 1839 at Kirkhouse; the first was Belted Will; later Mosstrooper was built there, but this machine had inside cylinders which fouled the rollers on the inclined plane, which was located above Forest Head. Locomotives were required to traverse the incline to reach the upper level, and this unforeseen limitation was serious; a special carriage had to be built to convey the locomotive over the incline.

Thompson improved and extended the existing mine workings, driving drifts and a drainage tunnel over several years, considerably expanding and improving the collieries. However he died in 1851. His widow Maria Thompson took over the firm.

== Alston branch ==
In 1851, the Newcastle and Carlisle Railway was completing its Alston branch, running from Haltwhistle; the primary purpose of the line was to serve the lead mines in the hills between Alston and Nenthead. The line passed near Lambley and had a short branch to the colliery there, a little west of the new line. The colliery was not operated by Thompson and Sons, but the firm decided to extend their line from Midgeholme to Lambley, and join the N&CR there. As well as serving the colliery output, the connection with the N&CR was valuable. The Thompson and Sons extension and the N&CR branch opened on 5 January 1852. Rails recovered from the by-passed waggonway at Milton were used for this construction.

== Development ==
Over the succeeding twenty years, the firm progressively upgraded the track and the wagons, both of which were primitive at first.

Tindale Fell colliery ceased operation by about 1870 and Blacksyke followed in 1872; the branches ceased operation concurrently with the pits. A new colliery called Howard opened near Greenside. The business was expanding and in 1872 an additional engine was acquired, named Tichborne (in reference to the Tichborne case which was preoccupying the newspapers at the time). However, Tichborne proved to be too heavy for the permanent way and was converted to a tender engine, transferring the weight of the water from the tank in 1879. Another tender engine, No 5, was purchased in 1878.

== Brampton town ==
Brampton was an important township, with a population of about 3,500 at this time and as a market town it received a considerable volume of goods and visitors. The horse-drawn dandy coach connection from Milton station on the main line (Note: The North Eastern Railway had absorbed the Newcastle and Carlisle Railway and now operated the main line services.) was increasingly criticised and goods had to be carted from Milton station, renamed Brampton in 1870.

Local people petitioned the North Eastern Railway to construct a branch line to Brampton, independently of the Thompson's line, but this was refused.

A public meeting in Brampton in 1889 recorded that period and agreed that the situation was unsatisfactory:

It was a positive fact that in Carlisle they could have goods delivered from London in less time than they could get them delivered from Carlisle in Brampton... In 1875, a deputation [had] waited upon the directors [of the North Eastern Railway] and endeavoured to induce them to make a branch line into Brampton... In October however, a letter was received stating that the directors were not able to come to the conclusion that it was desirable for the company to undertake the construction of a branch line... Overtures were then made to the late Colonel Thompson, who agreed to improve the "Dandy" accommodation.

The Thompson firm decided to respond for an agricultural fair on 13 November 1879 by hiring in a North Eastern Railway steam locomotive and carriages. (They appear to have done so for the September show annually since 1869, (Note: Charters is contradictory on these dates, on page 13.) hauled by the locomotive Garibaldi. Next they erected a small platform at the Sands (Note: The area where the Swartle and the Newcastle Road converge.) at Brampton (close to the staiths) and relaid the track with steel rails, and acquired a steam locomotive, Dandie Dinmont, and started a steam passenger operation from 4 July 1881.

In 1889, the meeting referred to above complained about the branch service, adding that "The fare which people had to pay from Brampton Junction to Brampton and back, sixpence, was, considering the short distance, a very severe tax, and undoubtedly tended to keep people away from the market." In 1890 the Thompson and Sons lease of the collieries and railways from the Earl of Carlisle was to be renewed, but the Earl of Carlisle required that the branch line from Brampton Junction to Brampton should be inspected. The Board of Trade inspector duly visited and required certain improvements; there was a 1 in 30 gradient on the branch, and there was no signalling or any normal railway safety system. Thompson and Sons decided not to make the required improvements and gave notice to discontinue the passenger operation on 30 April 1890. This left the town without a passenger train service for the time being.

== Colliery developments ==
In 1893 the Midgeholme colliery ceased operation, although a new pit at Roachburn opened soon after. It was located a mile west of Tindale Fell. The Brampton Railway was buoyant, carrying most of the coal output of its area, and also stone and limestone, to Brampton Junction for onward conveyance by the North Eastern Railway.

In the final years of the nineteenth century the mineral output of the area declined steeply, eventually only Roachburn colliery continuing in operation. Against this trend Thompson and Sons acquired a new six-coupled locomotive, Sheriff, in 1900.

In 1908, there was an inundation at Roachburn killing three men; the tragedy affected the health of the surviving owner of Thompson and Sons, and he decided to close the business down.

== Naworth Coal Company ==
For a time it looked as if the local industry was at an end, but a new company quickly took up the work: the Naworth Coal Company Ltd was formed. It took over the mineral workings and the railway formerly operated by Thompson and Sons, but the passenger operation to Brampton Town remained closed.

The Naworth Company opened a new pit at Gairs; the work lasted from 1909 to 1911. It was located at an extremely remote position and a new branch line two miles long was necessary, built in 1909 - 1910. Steep gradients existed on the line, the steepest being 1 in 18. Roachburn pit closed down in February 1912, but the washery facilities at Midgeholme continued in use.

The Naworth company opened new coal workings at Midgeholme and the railway from Tindale to Midgeholme once again became well used.

== Brampton Town branch separated from the network ==
Talks about the resumption of passenger operation on the Brampton Town branch continued at this time, with the North Eastern Railway being the obvious choice of operator now. However the Earl of Carlisle demanded a high rental for the line, and the North Eastern Railway, seeing that they would have to pay a considerable sum for modernising the line and that income would be limited, did not conclude a deal. The Earl of Carlisle died in 1912, and shortly after his death a 50-year lease on satisfactory terms was concluded with the Dowager Countess. Track upgrading, a bridge reconstruction, and new goods shed facilities were completed and an opening ceremony for the upgraded line took place on 31 July 1913; the public passenger service started the following day, 1 August 1913. A Fletcher 0-4-4 tank engine, no. 1089, was allocated to the service, operating between two coaches (Note: Charters contradicts himself on this, on page 21.) as a push-and-pull train. The Westinghouse brake system was used. The line from Brampton Junction to Brampton was now in separate hands from the colliery part of the network, and coal from the pits to Brampton was exchanged at the junction.

War work in Brampton was considerable during World War I and for a while passenger traffic increased on the branch. Nonetheless, due to manpower shortages the North Eastern Railway suspended the service from 1 March 1917; it reopened on 1 March 1920. In 1923 the North Eastern Railway became a constituent of the new London and North Eastern Railway (LNER), as a result of the Railways Act 1921. The LNER soon reviewed the commercial position of the Brampton branch, and finding it unsustainable, it terminated the passenger service from 29 October 1923; the goods service was discontinued from 31 December 1923, and the branch was shut.

== Naworth Collieries takes over ==
From 1921, the Naworth Coal Company tried several new or revived workings, but these proved less than satisfactory, and soon the company was struggling financially. In 1924 it went into liquidation, and the railway and the Gairs and Midgeholme activities ceased. At first it seemed that the end had come for mining and for the Brampton Railway. However Charles Roberts quickly founded Naworth Collieries and assumed all the properties of the Naworth Coal Company, and after six months activity resumed. Gairs Colliery reopened, and with it almost the entire colliery railway network.

Having taken over a loss-making mining company, it was not surprising that survival was difficult for the new owner, and geological setbacks soon proved challenging. Then in December 1925 the Tindale Granite Company obtained a lease of quarries at Tindale; the product was whinstone, used chiefly for road construction, and during 1926 production was well under way; a narrow gauge railway two miles long on an incline brought the product to the main railway, which conveyed it to Brampton Junction. In 1926 the Midgeholme colliery resumed limited output as well. The suddenly increased traffic and the poor condition of the earlier Thompson and Sons locomotives motivated the Naworth company to acquire a new six-coupled saddle tank locomotive; it was named Tindale. A second, similar, new engine, to be named Stephenson was acquired in 1927.

== More industry ==
In 1927, the Kirkhouse Brick and Tile Works started production; the operation required shale for the firing and this was brought in from Forest Head, providing more business for the railway. In 1931 Naworth Limeworks started output from Bishop Hill quarry near the bottom of Tindale Fell. This necessitated an extension of the railway. At this time the Prior and Minthill drifts were producing coal, as was Gairs, but the Tindale Granite Company was the most useful customer of the railway.

The mineral line to Gairs and to Foresthead Quarries used the old Tindale wagonway course from Clowsgill to Howgill and the Foresthead line was laid on the first half mile of the old branch line to Blacksyke. The coalpits at Gairs were at a much higher altitude and there is evidence at Howgill of the old embankment there having been raised several feet higher than the original in the regrading of this line.

The fortunes of coal and other mineral extraction in the area varied considerably in the following years. There were positive moves at Denton Fell and New Venture, and the company drove several new drifts at Midgeholme, which brought revitalised traffic to that end of the line from 1935; at the same time the Gairs was becoming worked out. From this time transport by lorry instead of by rail started to gain the ascendency for some traffics.

== Nationalisation ==
The collieries of Great Britain were nationalised following the Coal Industry Nationalisation Act 1946, which took effect in 1947; the National Coal Board took over the management of the collieries in the area. As owner of the railway it set rates for the conveyance of shale for the Kirkhouse brickworks, and it decided to increase these substantially; this led to the immediate transfer of the traffic to road, and the portion of the Blacksyke branch accordingly became moribund.

Many of the pits in the area declined, water inundation being a particular problem, and the National Coal Board increasingly used road transport to other railheads. The Brampton Railway lease was given up in March 1953, the last train running on 28 March 1953, except for some residual clearance tasks on 30 March.
