= List of crossings of the River Tyne =

This article lists the crossings of the River Tyne, heading upstream from the North Sea.

== Tyne ==
Crossing	Carries	Location	Built	Coordinates	Image
Shields Ferry		North Tyneside, South Tyneside	1377		
Second Tyne vehicle tunnel	A19 road	Tyne and Wear	25 Feb 2011		
First Tyne vehicle tunnel	A19 road	Tyne and Wear	19 Oct 1967		
Tyne pedestrian and cyclist tunnel	Walkway, bike lane	South Tyneside, North Tyneside	24 Jul 1951		
Gateshead Millennium Bridge	Walkway	Tyneside	2000		
Tyne Bridge	A167 road (from 1990)	Tyneside	10 Oct 1928		
Swing Bridge	Unclassified road	Tyneside	15 Jun 1876		
High Level Bridge	Durham Coast Line, East Coast Main Line, B1307 road	Tyneside	27 Sep 1849		
Queen Elizabeth II Metro Bridge	Tyne and Wear Metro	Newcastle upon Tyne, Gateshead	1981		
King Edward VII Bridge	East Coast Main Line	Newcastle upon Tyne, Gateshead	10 Jul 1906		
Redheugh Bridge	A189 road	Newcastle upon Tyne, Gateshead	18 May 1983		
Scotswood Bridge	A695 road	Scotswood	1964		
Scotswood Railway Bridge	Tyne Valley Line (from 1871, until Oct 1982), piping	Scotswood	1871		
Blaydon Bridge	A1 road	Tyneside	3 Dec 1990		
Newburn Bridge	Unclassified road	Tyneside	1893		
Wylam Bridge	Unclassified road	Northumberland	1836		
Wylam Railway Bridge	Scotswood, Newburn and Wylam Railway, National Cycle Route 72	Northumberland	6 Oct 1876		
Ovingham footbridge	Walkway, National Cycle Route 72	Ovingham, Prudhoe	1974		
Ovingham road bridge	Unclassified road	Ovingham	20 Dec 1883		
Bywell Bridge	B6309 road	Stocksfield, Bywell	1838		
Styford Bridge	A68 road	Northumberland	1979		
Corbridge Bridge	B6321 road (from 1979)	Corbridge	1674		
Hexham Bridge	A6079 road, National Cycle Route 72	Northumberland	1793		
Hexham Old Bridge	Road		1770		
Border Counties Bridge	Border Counties Railway	Northumberland	1856		
Constantius Bridge	A69 road	Northumberland	1976		

== North Tyne ==
Crossing	Carries	Location	Built	Coordinates	Image
Chesters Bridge	Military Way	Humshaugh, Wall	122		
Chollerford Bridge	Military Road	Northumberland	1785		
Wark Bridge	Unclassified road	Northumberland	1878		
Bellingham Bridge	B6320 road	Northumberland	1834		
Tarset Bridge	Unclassified road	Tarset	1974		
Greystead Bridge	Footpath	Greystead	1862		
Falstone Bridge	Unclassified road	Falstone	1843		
Kielder Viaduct	Border Counties Railway (until Sep 1958), Lakeside Way	Northumberland	1862		
Butteryhaugh Bridge	Unclassified road		1962		
Kerseycleugh Bridge	Unclassified road	Northumberland	1853		

== South Tyne ==
Crossing	Carries	Location	Built	Coordinates	Image
Warden Railway Bridge	Tyne Valley Line	Northumberland	1904		
Warden Bridge	Unclassified road	Warden	Nov 1903		
New Haydon Bridge	A686 road	Northumberland	1970		
Old Haydon Bridge	Footpath	Northumberland	1776		
Haydon Bridge Viaduct	A69 road	Northumberland	25 Mar 2009		
Lipwood Railway Bridge	Tyne Valley Line	Northumberland	1866		
Ridley Bridge	Unclassified road	Northumberland	1792		
Ridley Railway Bridge	Tyne Valley Line	Northumberland	1907		
Millhouse Bridge	Footpath	Northumberland	1883		
Haltwhistle A69 Bridge (East)	A69 road	Northumberland	1994		
Alston Arches Viaduct	Alston line (until May 1976), footpath (from Jul 2006)	Northumberland	17 Nov 1852		
Blue Bridge	Pennine Cycleway, footpath	Northumberland	1875		
Bellister Bridge	Footpath	Northumberland	1967		
Haltwhistle A69 Bridge (West)	A69 road	Northumberland	1997		
Featherstone Bridge	Unclassified road	Northumberland	1775		
Featherstone Castle Footbridge	Footpath	Northumberland	1990		
Diamond Oak Bridge	Unclassified road	Northumberland	1975		
Lambley Footbridge	Footpath	Northumberland	1992		
Lambley Viaduct	Alston line (until May 1976), footpath	Northumberland	1852		
Eals footbridge	Footpath	Northumberland	1961		
Eals Bridge	Unclassified road	Northumberland	1733		
Parson Shields bridge	Farm road		1972		
Williamston Bridge	Unclassified road	Slaggyford			
Kirkhaugh footbridge	Footpath	Kirkhaugh			
Alston railway bridge	Alston line (until May 1976), South Tyne Trail, South Tynedale Railway (from Jul 1983)	Alston Moor	1852		
Alston bridge	A686 road	Alston	1836		
Garrigill Bridge	Unclassified road	Garrigill			

== See also ==
- Lemington Bridge
