= Haydon Bridge (disambiguation) =

Haydon Bridge is a village in Northumberland, England

It can also refer to:

- Old Haydon Bridge, a bridge in that village
- New Haydon Bridge, a bridge in that village
- Haydon Bridge Viaduct, a bridge in that village

== See also ==
- Hayden Bridge (disambiguation)
