= Bearsbridge =

Village in Northumberland, in England

Coordinates: 54.912°N 2.337°W

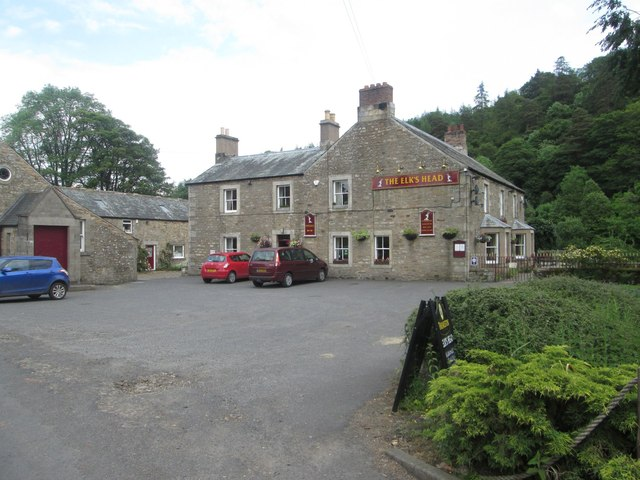
- The Elk's Head Inn

- Location within Northumberland
- OS grid reference: NY785575
- Unitary authority: Northumberland
- Ceremonial county: Northumberland
- Region: North East
- Country: England
- Sovereign state: United Kingdom
- Post town: HEXHAM
- Postcode district: NE47
- Police: Northumbria
- Fire: Northumberland
- Ambulance: North East
- UK Parliament: Hexham

Bearsbridge is a village in Northumberland, in England. It is situated to the west of Hexham, on the A686.

== Governance ==
Bearsbridge is in the parliamentary constituency of Hexham.
