= Border Counties Bridge =

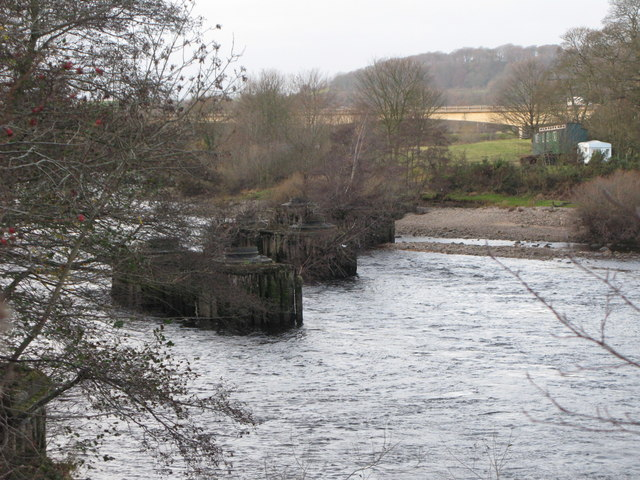
- Border Counties Bridge
- Coordinates: 54.9821°N 2.1207°W
- OS grid reference: NY923652
- Carries: Formerly, Border Counties Railway
- Crosses: River Tyne
- Locale: Northumberland
- Owner: British Railways at the time of demolition in 1959
- Preceded by: Hexham Bridge
- Followed by: Constantius Bridge

Characteristics
- Design: Beam bridge
- Material: Wrought Iron
- Pier construction: Cast Iron and Masonry/Concrete
- No. of spans: 5
- Piers in water: 4

Rail characteristics
- No. of tracks: Formerly, 1
- Track gauge: 1,435 mm (4 ft 8 1/2 in)

History
- Construction end: 1856
- Opened: 1856
- Closed: 1 September 1958

Location
- Interactive map of Border Counties Bridge

Border Counties Railway

Overview
- Status: Closed
- Locale: Roxburghshire, Scotland; Northumberland, England

Service
- Type: Heavy rail

History
- Commenced: 11 December 1855
- Opened: 2 April 1858
- Completed: 24 June 1862
- Merged into: North British Railway - 1860
- Merged into: London North Eastern Railway - 1923
- Merged into: British Railways - 1948
- Closed: 1 September 1958; (except Reedsmouth–Bellingham, closed 11 November 1963)

Technical
- Track gauge: 4 ft 8 1/2 in (1,435 mm)

Border Counties Bridge was a 19th-century railway bridge across the River Tyne just west of Hexham, Northumberland, England. The bridge used to carry the Border Counties Railway over the River Tyne at Border Counties Junction with the Newcastle and Carlisle Railway.

== History ==
The Border Counties Railway was authorised by Parliament in 1854. The bridge was part of that railway and linked the Newcastle and Carlisle Railway, near Hexham, with the Border Union Railway at Riccarton Junction. The first section of the route was opened between Hexham and Chollerford in 1858, the remainder opening in 1862.

The bridge was beset with problems from its construction when the temporary wooden structure erected initially to allow a crane access, was swept away by floods. The abutments at the south end had to be moved eastwards to avoid scouring of the river at its original site. Both weight and speed restrictions have always been a feature of the bridge. The bridge was reportedly damaged by floods in August 1948 and was given temporary repairs sufficient to keep the line open for a time.

The condition of the bridge was a major factor in the eventual closure of the line, the cost of repairs being considered prohibitive. Regular passenger trains ceased on 13 October 1956 although the line (and the bridge) remained open for goods traffic until 1 September 1958.

The bridge was demolished in 1959. Today, the remains of the piers can still be seen in the river.

Next bridge upstream	River Tyne	Next bridge downstream
Constantius Bridge; A69 road	Border Counties Bridge; Grid reference NY923652	Hexham Old Bridge
Next railway bridge upstream	River Tyne	Next railway bridge downstream
Warden Railway Bridge; Tyne Valley line	Border Counties Bridge; Grid reference NY923652	Wylam Railway Bridge; Formerly North Wylam loop, now National Cycle Route 72
Next road bridge upstream	River Tyne	Next road bridge downstream
Constantius Bridge; A69 road	Border Counties Bridge; Grid reference NY923652	Hexham Bridge; A6079 road
