= Ridley Railway Bridge =

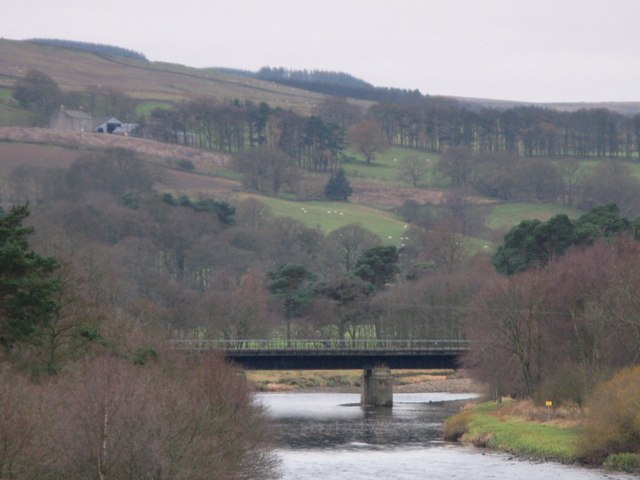
- Ridley Railway Bridge
- Coordinates: 54.9737°N 2.3255°W
- OS grid reference: NY814641
- Carries: Tyne Valley line
- Crosses: River South Tyne
- Locale: Northumberland
- Owner: Network Rail
- Maintained by: Network Rail
- Network Rail Bridge ID: NEC2-96
- Preceded by: Millhouse Bridge
- Followed by: Ridley Bridge

Characteristics
- Design: Girder bridge
- Material: Cast iron
- Pier construction: Sandstone

Rail characteristics
- No. of tracks: 2
- Track gauge: 1,435 mm (4 ft 8 1/2 in)

History
- Constructed by: Sir William Arrol & Co.
- Opened: 1907

Ridley Railway Bridge is a railway bridge carrying the Tyne Valley line between Newcastle upon Tyne and Carlisle across the River South Tyne near Ridley Hall in Northumberland.

== History ==
The first bridge near Ridley Hall for the railway between Newcastle upon Tyne and Carlisle was designed by the railway company's engineer, John Blackmore, and originally built of timber; it was completed in 1838 but as the condition of the wood deteriorated it was replaced by the current iron-girder structure constructed by Sir William Arrol & Co. in 1907. It was one of three bridges across the River Tyne and River Allen completed in 1838.

Such was the influence of the owner of Ridley Hall, Sir Matthew White Ridley, 4th Baronet, that a small station was built nearby for the benefit of the local community travelling on the Newcastle and Carlisle Railway. Cast iron railings from the original bridge, built in 1838, were recovered and retained by the Science Museum in London. The current bridge is approximately 137 metres (449 ft) long.

Next bridge upstream	River South Tyne	Next bridge downstream
Millhouse Bridge; Footbridge	Ridley Railway Bridge; Grid reference NY814641	Ridley Bridge
Next railway bridge upstream	River South Tyne	Next railway bridge downstream
Alston Arches Viaduct; Formerly Alston line, now footbridge	Ridley Railway Bridge; Grid reference NY814641	Warden Railway Bridge; Tyne Valley line
