= Constantius Bridge =

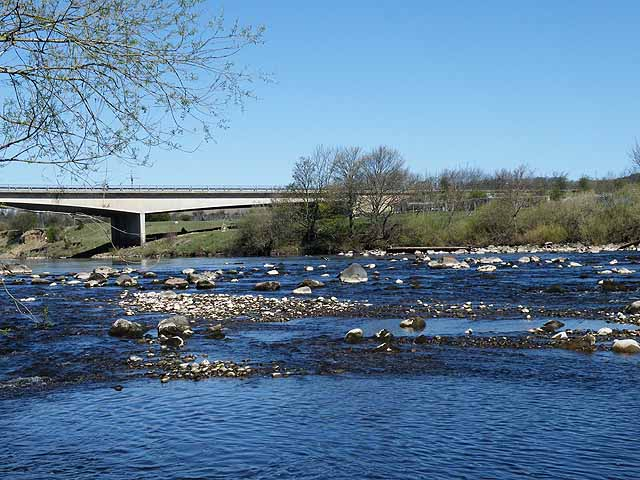
- Constantius Bridge
- Coordinates: 54.9841°N 2.1245°W
- OS grid reference: NY921654
- Carries: A69
- Crosses: River Tyne
- Locale: Northumberland
- Other name(s): Hexham A69 Bridge
- Named for: Constantius I
- Owner: Department for Transport
- Maintained by: National Highways
- Preceded by: River North Tyne; Chollerford Bridge; River South Tyne; Warden Railway Bridge
- Followed by: Hexham Bridge

Characteristics
- Design: Beam bridge
- Material: Concrete
- No. of spans: 3
- Piers in water: 2
- No. of lanes: 4

History
- Construction end: 1976
- Opened: 1976

Constantius Bridge is a modern concrete bridge across the River Tyne about 1 mile (2 km) north west of Hexham, Northumberland, England. The bridge carries the A69 road over the River Tyne and forms part of the Hexham bypass. It is the last crossing of the River Tyne before it splits into the North Tyne and South Tyne.

== History ==
In 1976 a new road was built to replace the old A69 through Hexham, and Hexham was by-passed on the north side of the river, necessitating a bridge crossing near Warden just west of Hexham. The bridge crosses the River Tyne just downstream from the "Meeting of the Waters" – the point where the North and South Tyne rivers join to form the main River Tyne, then crosses the railway to continue towards Haydon Bridge.

On 30 August 1975, during construction, there was a flood, and the scaffolding and shuttering for the westernmost span collapsed. The completed bridge has already required strengthening due to flood damage, showing that the Tyne has lost none of its capability for attacking bridge structures.

Next bridge upstream	River Tyne	Next bridge downstream
Chesters Bridge; Ruined Roman bridge, formerly Roman Military Way (River North Tyne); Warden Railway Bridge; Tyne Valley line (River South Tyne)	Constantius Bridge; Grid reference NY921654	Border Counties Bridge; Ruined, formerly Border Counties Railway
Next road bridge upstream	River Tyne	Next road bridge downstream
Chollerford Bridge; B6318 (River North Tyne); Warden Bridge; Road and 72 (River South Tyne)	Constantius Bridge; Grid reference NY921654	Hexham Bridge; A6079 and 72
