= Haydon Bridge Viaduct =

- Coordinates: 54.9710°N 2.2630°W
- OS grid reference: NY830642
- Carries: A69
- Crosses: River South Tyne; Tyne Valley line
- Locale: Northumberland
- Owner: Department for Transport
- Maintained by: National Highways
- Preceded by: Lipwood Railway Bridge
- Followed by: Old Haydon Bridge

Characteristics
- Design: Beam bridge
- Material: Concrete
- No. of spans: 4
- Piers in water: 2
- No. of lanes: 2

History
- Designer: Capita Symonds
- Constructed by: CVC Highway Solutions
- Fabrication by: Watson Steel
- Construction start: January 2007
- Opened: 25 March 2009
- Replaces: New Haydon Bridge; as route of A69

Location
- Interactive map of Haydon Bridge Viaduct

Haydon Bridge Viaduct carries the A69 Haydon Bridge bypass across both the Newcastle upon Tyne to Carlisle railway and the River South Tyne, about 1/2 mile (0.8 km) west of Haydon Bridge.

== History ==
Construction, which was undertaken by CVC Highway Solutions (a joint venture between Volker Stevin and Hanson Contracting and their design partner Capita Symonds), started in January 2007 and the bridge opened on 25 March 2009.

Next bridge upstream	River South Tyne	Next bridge downstream
Lipwood Railway Bridge; Tyne Valley line	Haydon Bridge Viaduct; Grid reference NY830642	Old Haydon Bridge; Footbridge
Next road bridge upstream	River South Tyne	Next road bridge downstream
Ridley Bridge	Haydon Bridge Viaduct; Grid reference NY830642	New Haydon Bridge; A686
