= Bright Tribe Trust =

Multi-Academy Trust

The Bright Tribe Trust was a multi-academy trust, active in October 2015, that took on failing schools.

A new Interim Eecutive Board (IEB) would be brought onto the school, along with a new headteacher. Bright Tribe would cite a school's continued financial deficit, and declining pupil numbers as reasons for subsequently the pulling out of sponsorship.

Bright Tribe sponsored 10 academies in Suffolk, Essex, Greater Manchester and the North of England.

== List of Schools ==
- Haydon Bridge High School, Hexham
- Fyndoune Community College (now closed), Durham
- Durham Community Business College (now Durham Academy), Durham
- Colchester Academy, Colchester
- Alde Valley Academy, Leiston
- The Whitehaven Academy, Whitehaven
- Castle Hill Junior School, Ipswich
- Castle Hill Infant School, Ipswich
- Cliff Lane Primary School, Ipswich
- Werneth Primary School, Oldham
- Haltwhistle Community Campus Upper, Northumberland
- Haltwhistle Community Campus Lower School, Northumberland
- Grindon Hall (now Christ's College, Sunderland).
