= Hexham Bridge =

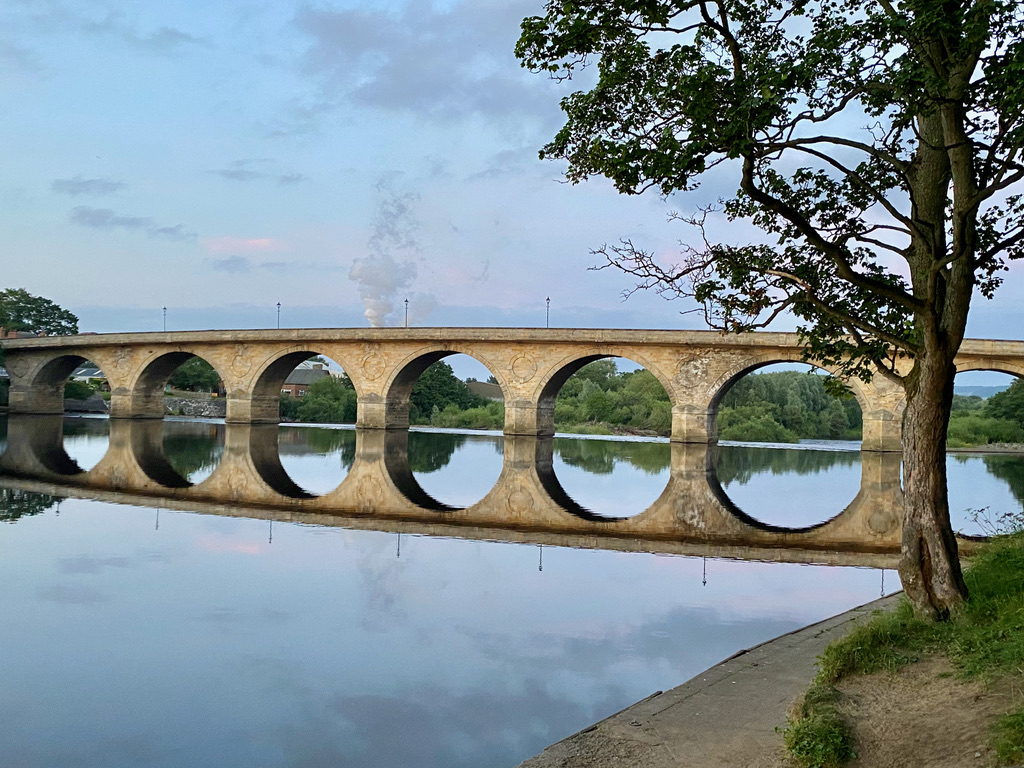
- Hexham Bridge
- Coordinates: 54.9767°N 2.0942°W
- OS grid reference: NY940646
- Carries: A6079; 72
- Crosses: River Tyne
- Locale: Northumberland
- Heritage status: Grade II* listed
- Preceded by: Constantius Bridge
- Followed by: Corbridge Bridge

Characteristics
- Design: Arch bridge
- Material: Stone
- No. of lanes: 2

History
- Designer: Robert Mylne
- Construction end: 1793
- Replaces: Hexham Old Bridge

Hexham Bridge is a road bridge in Northumberland, England linking Hexham with the North Tyne valley. It lies north of the town of Hexham and is the main access to the A69 bypass.

== History ==
The Tyne was crossed by two ferries called the east and the west boats (Warden Bridge). As a result of persistent agitation, a bridge was started in 1767 and completed in 1770. It was built by Mr Galt and consisted of seven arches. Less than a year later it was swept away in the great Tyne flood of 1771. In that flood, eight bridges shared the fate of Hexham. In 1774 a new attempt was made 50 yards (46 m) to the west by Mr Wooler, an engineer who had been working on the new Newcastle bridge. Piles were sunk to carry the piers but work was abandoned on discovering that the "soil beneath the gravel was a quicksand with no more resistance than chaff". This first bridge, Hexham Old Bridge, was about 1 mile (2 km) upstream of the present bridge.

The authorities next approached John Smeaton, whose name as an engineer was famous. Henry Errington of Sandhoe was given the contract for the sum of £4,700, and work started in 1777. Although the half-completed piers were washed away the following year, work continued and the new bridge was opened to traffic in 1780. The Newcastle Chronicle, Saturday 8th July 1780 had "Saturday last, the passage along the New Bridge over Tyne at Hexham wa« opened, the Most Noble Errington was the first that passed it, who made a handsome present to the workmen." However, on 10 March 1782, there was a heavy fall of snow followed by a violent hurricane. The valleys of the north and south Tyne were inundated and the nine arches were completely overturned. They are still visible and act as a sort of weir. Robert Mylne, a famous architect and engineer, was called in to report on the feasibility of rebuilding Smeaton's bridge. He was eventually given the contract to build a fourth bridge, and the work was completed in 1793.

It is listed as a Grade II* building by Historic England.

Next bridge upstream	River Tyne	Next bridge downstream
Border Counties Bridge; Ruined, formerly Border Counties Railway	Hexham Bridge; Grid reference NY940646	Corbridge Bridge; B6321
Next road bridge upstream	River Tyne	Next road bridge downstream
Constantius Bridge; A69	Hexham Bridge; Grid reference NY940646	Corbridge Bridge; B6321
