= Hexham Old Bridge =

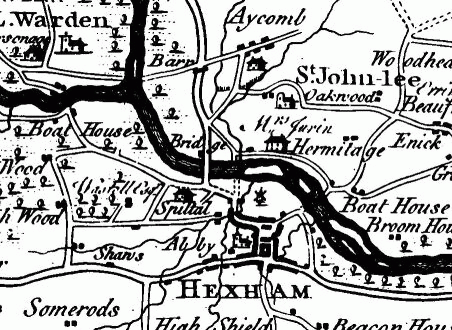
- Map of 1769
- Coordinates: 54.982°N 2.112°W
- Carries: Road
- Crosses: River Tyne
- Locale: Northumberland, England

Characteristics
- Design: arch
- Material: Stone
- No. of spans: seven

History
- Construction start: 1767
- Construction end: 1770
- Closed: 1771

Hexham Old Bridge was an 18th-century stone bridge across the River Tyne at Hexham, Northumberland, England. It was located about 1 mile (2 km) upstream of the present Hexham Bridge.

== History ==
The Tyne was crossed by two ferries called the east (at the location of the present bridge) and the west boats (Warden Bridge). As a result of persistent agitation a bridge was started in 1767 and completed in 1770. A map of 1769 by W. Armstrong shows the bridge to the west of Hexham close by the present Old Bridge End farm. It was built by a Mr. Gait and consisted of seven arches. Less than a year later it was swept away in the great Tyne flood of 1771. In that flood eight bridges shared the fate of Hexham. In 1774 a new attempt was made fifty yards to the west by Mr. Wooler, an engineer who had been working on the new Newcastle bridge. Piles were sunk to carry the piers but work was abandoned on discovering that the "soil beneath the gravel was a quicksand with no more resistance than chaff".

Nothing remains today of Hexham Old Bridge but the name continues as the name of the adjacent farm: Old Bridge End (grid reference NY929653).

== Notes ==
Next bridge upstream	River Tyne	Next bridge downstream
Border Counties Bridge (ruined railway bridge)	Hexham Old Bridge; Grid reference NY929653	Hexham Bridge (A6079 road)
Next road crossing upstream	River Tyne	Next road crossing downstream
Constantius Bridge (A69 road)	Hexham Old Bridge; Grid reference NY929653	Hexham Bridge (A6079 road)
