= Warden Railway Bridge =

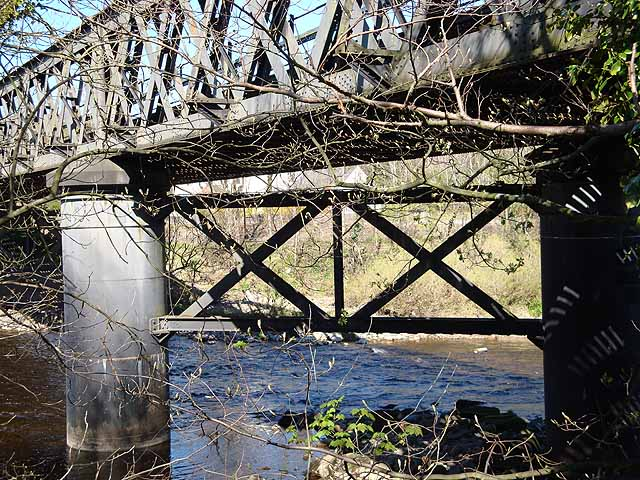
- Warden Railway Bridge
- Coordinates: 54.9880°N 2.1377°W
- OS grid reference: NY912659
- Carries: Tyne Valley line
- Crosses: River South Tyne
- Locale: Northumberland
- Owner: Network Rail
- Maintained by: Network Rail
- Network Rail Bridge ID: NEC2-83
- Preceded by: Warden Bridge
- Followed by: Constantius Bridge

Characteristics
- Design: Beam bridge
- Material: Cast iron
- No. of spans: 4
- Piers in water: 3

Rail characteristics
- No. of tracks: 2
- Track gauge: 1,435 mm (4 ft 8 1/2 in)

History
- Opened: 1904

Location
- Interactive map of Warden Railway Bridge

Warden Railway Bridge is a railway bridge carrying the Tyne Valley line between Newcastle upon Tyne and Carlisle across the River South Tyne near Warden, Northumberland.

== History ==
The first bridge at Warden for the railway between Newcastle upon Tyne and Carlisle was designed by John Blackmore and originally built of timber; it burnt down in 1848 and cast-iron arches were placed on the original piers. A second bridge on a different alignment was completed in 1904 and remains in use as part of the Tyne Valley line.

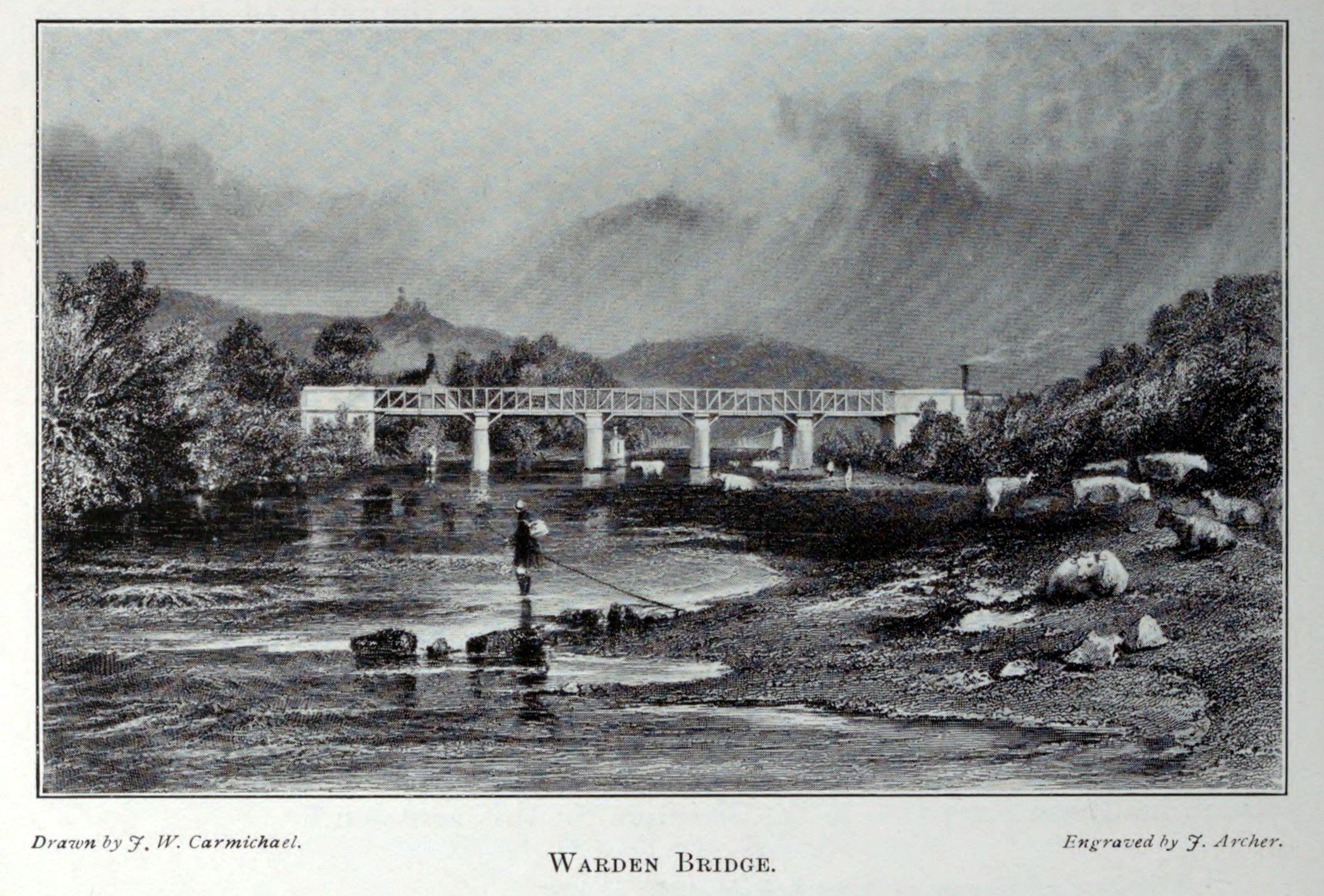
The old Warden Railway Bridge

Next bridge upstream	River South Tyne	Next bridge downstream
Warden Bridge; Road and National Cycle Route 72	Warden Railway Bridge; Grid reference NY912659	Constantius Bridge; A69 road (River Tyne)
Next railway bridge upstream	River South Tyne	Next railway bridge downstream
Lipwood Railway Bridge; Tyne Valley line	Warden Railway Bridge; Grid reference NY912659	Border Counties Bridge; Ruined, formerly Border Counties Railway (River Tyne)
