= New Haydon Bridge =

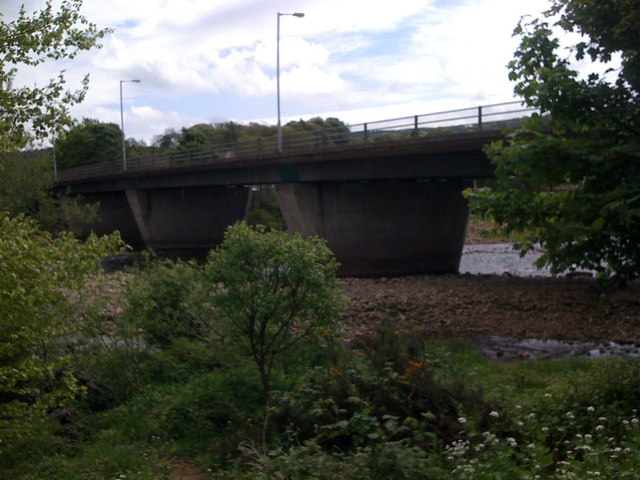
- New Haydon Bridge
- Coordinates: 54.9735°N 2.2457°W
- OS grid reference: NY843643
- Carries: A686
- Crosses: River South Tyne
- Locale: Northumberland
- Preceded by: Old Haydon Bridge
- Followed by: Warden Bridge

Characteristics
- Design: Beam bridge
- Material: Concrete
- No. of spans: 5
- Piers in water: 4
- No. of lanes: 2

History
- Designer: Northumberland County Council
- Constructed by: Kier Group
- Construction start: 1967
- Construction cost: £200,000
- Opened: 1970
- Replaces: Old Haydon Bridge
- Replaced by: Haydon Bridge Viaduct; as route of A69

The New Haydon Bridge is a bridge across the River South Tyne providing access to and from the village of Haydon Bridge.

== History ==
The bridge, which was built by Kier Group to carry the A69 road across the River South Tyne, was completed in 1970.

Next bridge upstream	River South Tyne	Next bridge downstream
Old Haydon Bridge; Footbridge	New Haydon Bridge; Grid reference NY843643	Warden Bridge; Road and 72
