= Lemington Bridge =

Bridge in Tyne and Wear, England

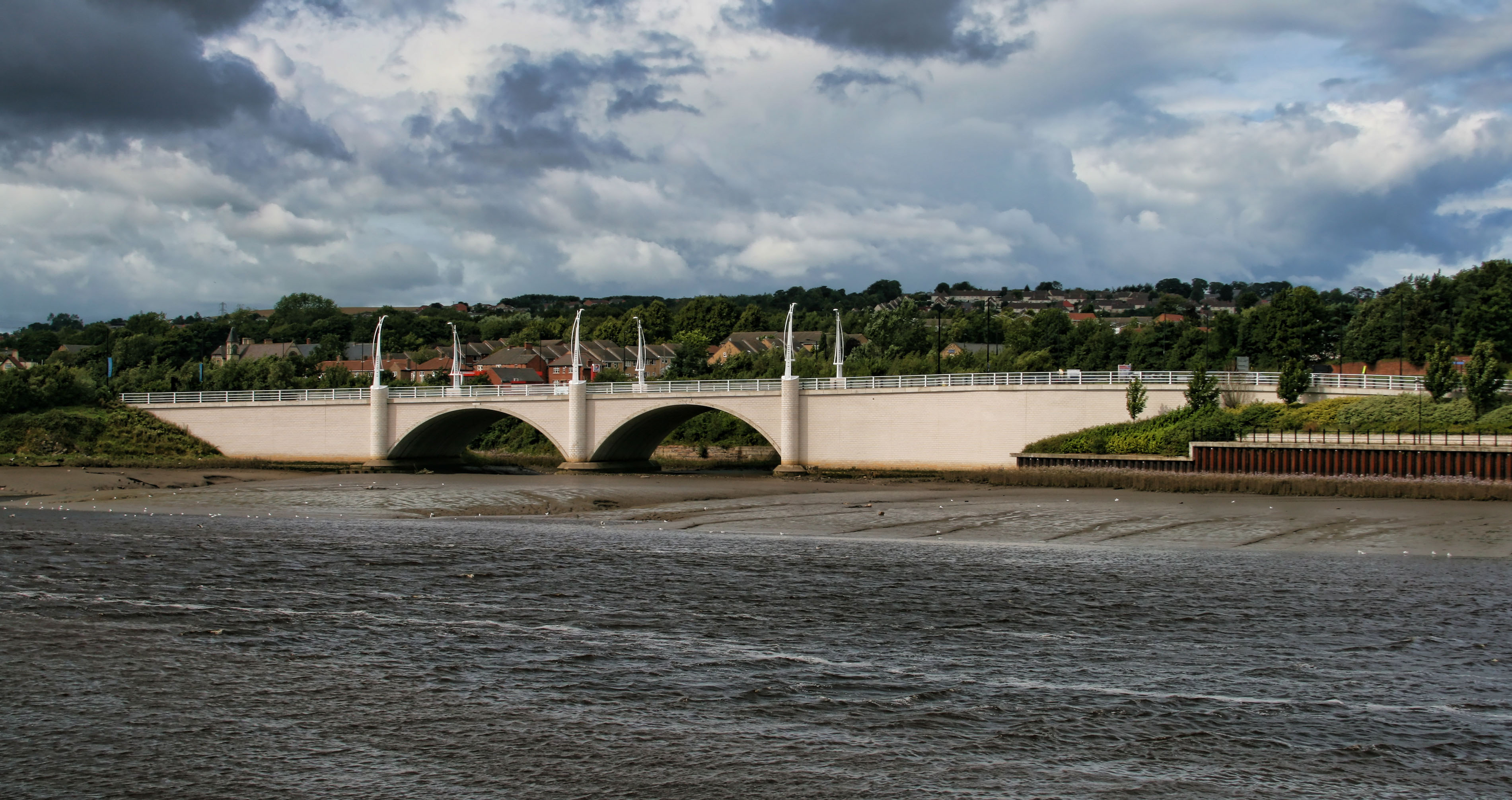
- Lemington Bridge in 2010.
- Coordinates: 54.97235°N 1.7022°W
- OS grid reference: NZ191642

Characteristics
- Design: Two-arch bridge
- Material: Concrete
- Piers in water: 3

History
- Built: 2001

Location
- Interactive map of Lemington Bridge

Lemington Bridge is a two-arch concrete bridge in Lemington, Tyne and Wear, England. The bridge goes over Lemington Gut, a remnant of the former course of the River Tyne, before it was rerouted.

The bridge was constructed in 2001. It allowed pedestrian and road access to Newburn Riverside Industrial Estate.

== See also ==
- List of crossings of the River Tyne
