= Hayden Bridge =

Hayden Bridge may refer to:

- Hayden Bridge (Alsea, Oregon)
- Hayden Bridge (Springfield, Oregon)

== See also ==
- Haydon Bridge (disambiguation)
