= Colchester Academy =

Location
- Hawthorn Avenue; Colchester, Essex, CO4 3JL; United Kingdom; 51.8906°N 0.946°E

Information
- Type: Academy
- Local authority: Essex
- Trust: Penrose Learning Trust UID:16707
- Specialist: English and Health Sciences.
- Department for Education URN: 136195 Tables
- Ofsted: Reports
- Principal: Jenny Betts
- Gender: Coeducational
- Age: 11 to 16
- Enrolment: 758 As of March 2020
- Capacity: 1200
- Website: www.colchesteracademy.org.uk

Colchester Academy, formerly Sir Charles Lucas Arts College, is a secondary school in Colchester, Essex specialising in English and Health Sciences. It opened on 6 September 2010.

== Description ==
Colchester Academy opened in September 2010 in the existing buildings of its predecessor school and moved into new, purpose-built academy buildings in February 2014. The academy is sponsored by Colchester Institute and the University of Essex. Colchester Academy is smaller than the average-sized secondary school, with a capacity for 1200 but as of March 2020 only having 758.

The school received a good ofsted report in 2017 where the inspectors said that the trust was giving the school leaders good support, and through the efforts of the head and senior staff structures were in place. There were good relationships between adults and students. The behaviour of the pupils had improved and consequently their results had improved too.

== Academics ==
There is a two-year Key Stage 3, where subjects are taught that comply with the National Curriculum. The language taught is Spanish. At the end of year, students select the options. They are advised to follow one of three pathways: a totally academic one, suitable for students who are aiming for a Russell Group university, a four by four one- with four academic GCSE courses and four vocational BTEC courses and a mainly vocational pathway. Within these pathways there are six or seven combinations of subjects. Each student studies four optional subjects and a core of 4 subjects, with a few statutory non-exam activities.

== Controversy ==
A BBC Panorama investigation broadcast in September 2018 suggested that some work, funded from public money, was not completed in the academy's Sports Centre. The Conservative government, which had approved the academy initiative, had been warned about problems in 2015, but no action had been taken. Michael Dwan, who set up Bright Tribe, said "I am not in control of the trusts and never have been."

== See also ==
- List of secondary schools in Essex
