= Ridley Bridge =

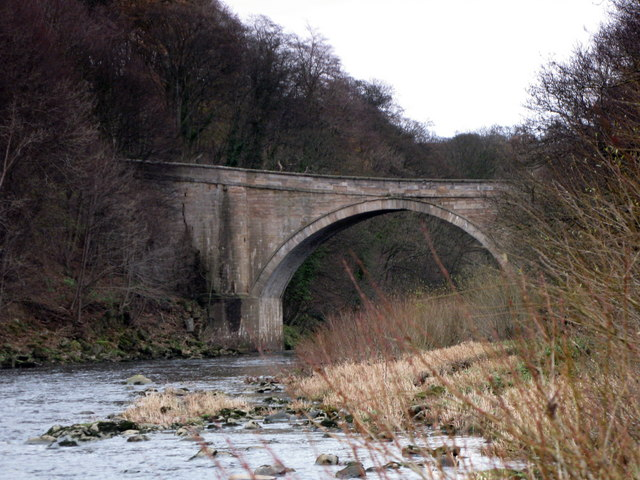
- Ridley Bridge
- Coordinates: 54.9767°N 2.3186°W
- OS grid reference: NY797647
- Carries: Motor vehicles; Cycles; Pedestrians
- Crosses: River South Tyne
- Locale: Northumberland
- Heritage status: Grade II* listed

Characteristics
- Design: Arch bridge
- Material: Stone
- No. of lanes: Single-track road

History
- Designer: Robert Mylne
- Construction start: 1788
- Construction end: 1791
- Opened: 1792

Ridley Bridge is a stone arch road bridge over the River South Tyne near Ridley Hall in Northumberland.

== History ==
This stone arch bridge was designed by Robert Mylne and constructed in 1792. It has been listed Grade II* by Historic England.

Next bridge upstream	River South Tyne	Next bridge downstream
Ridley Railway Bridge; Tyne Valley line	Ridley Bridge; Grid reference NY797647	Lipwood Railway Bridge; Tyne Valley line
Next road bridge upstream	River South Tyne	Next road bridge downstream
Haltwhistle A69 Bridge, East; A69	Ridley Bridge; Grid reference NY797647	New Haydon Bridge; A69
