= Lipwood Railway Bridge =

- Coordinates: 54.9710°N 2.2926°W
- OS grid reference: NY813640
- Carries: Tyne Valley line
- Crosses: River South Tyne
- Locale: Northumberland
- Owner: Network Rail
- Maintained by: Network Rail
- Network Rail Bridge ID: NEC2-93
- Preceded by: Ridley Bridge
- Followed by: Haydon Bridge Viaduct

Characteristics
- Design: Girder bridge
- Material: Wrought iron
- Pier construction: Stone

Rail characteristics
- No. of tracks: 2
- Track gauge: 1,435 mm (4 ft 8 1/2 in)

History
- Construction start: 1865
- Construction end: 1866
- Construction cost: £3,126
- Opened: 1866

Location
- Interactive map of Lipwood Railway Bridge

Lipwood Railway Bridge is a railway bridge carrying the Tyne Valley line between Newcastle upon Tyne and Carlisle across the River South Tyne near Lipwood in Northumberland.

== History ==
The first bridge at Lipwood for the railway between Newcastle upon Tyne and Carlisle was designed by John Blackmore and originally built of timber; it was completed in 1838 but as the condition of the wood deteriorated it was replaced by the current iron-girder structure in 1866.

Next bridge upstream	River South Tyne	Next bridge downstream
Ridley Bridge	Lipwood Railway Bridge; Grid reference NY813640	Haydon Bridge Viaduct; A69
Next railway bridge upstream	River South Tyne	Next railway bridge downstream
Ridley Railway Bridge; Tyne Valley line	Lipwood Railway Bridge; Grid reference NY813640	Warden Railway Bridge; Tyne Valley line
