= Warden Bridge =

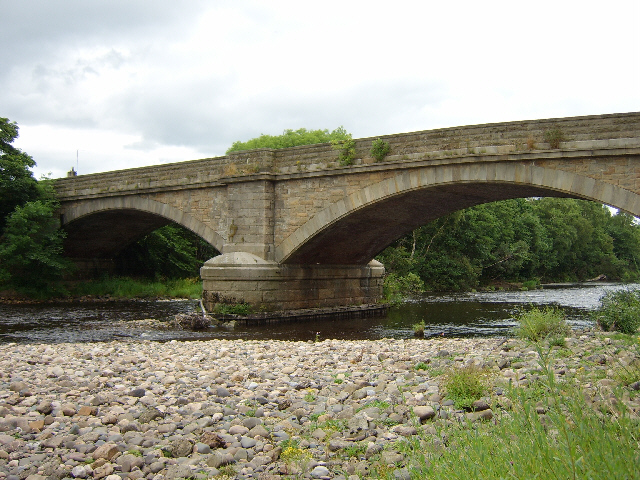
- Warden Bridge
- Coordinates: 54.9883°N 2.1418°W
- OS grid reference: NY910660
- Carries: Road; National Cycle Route 72; National Byway
- Crosses: River South Tyne
- Locale: Northumberland
- Owner: Northumberland County Council
- Preceded by: New Haydon Bridge
- Followed by: Warden Railway Bridge

Characteristics
- Design: Arch bridge
- Material: Stone
- No. of spans: 2
- Piers in water: 1
- No. of lanes: 2

History
- Opened: 1903
- Inaugurated: November 1903
- Replaces: Warden Suspension Bridge

Warden Bridge is a road bridge across the River South Tyne near Warden.

== History ==
The first road bridge at Warden was a suspension bridge built in 1826. It was replaced by a stone arch bridge in 1903.

Next bridge upstream	River South Tyne	Next bridge downstream
New Haydon Bridge; A686 road	Warden Bridge; Grid reference NY910660	Warden Railway Bridge; Tyne Valley line
