= Kerseycleugh Bridge =

Stone bridge across the River North Tyne at Kerseycleugh in Northumberland

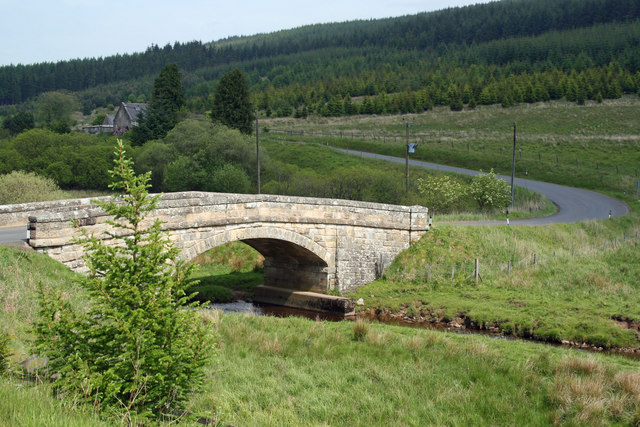
- Coordinates: 55.2476°N 2.6020°W
- OS grid reference: NY723872
- Carries: Minor road traffic
- Crosses: River North Tyne
- Locale: Northumberland

Characteristics
- Design: Arch bridge
- Material: Stone
- No. of spans: 1
- No. of lanes: Single-track road

History
- Construction end: 1853
- Opened: 1853

Kerseycleugh Bridge is a small stone bridge across the River North Tyne at Kerseycleugh in Northumberland.

== History ==
The bridge, which has one stone arch, was completed in 1853. The structure, which has a reinforced concrete base, is the first significant road bridge across the river after its source.
