= Featherstone Castle Footbridge =

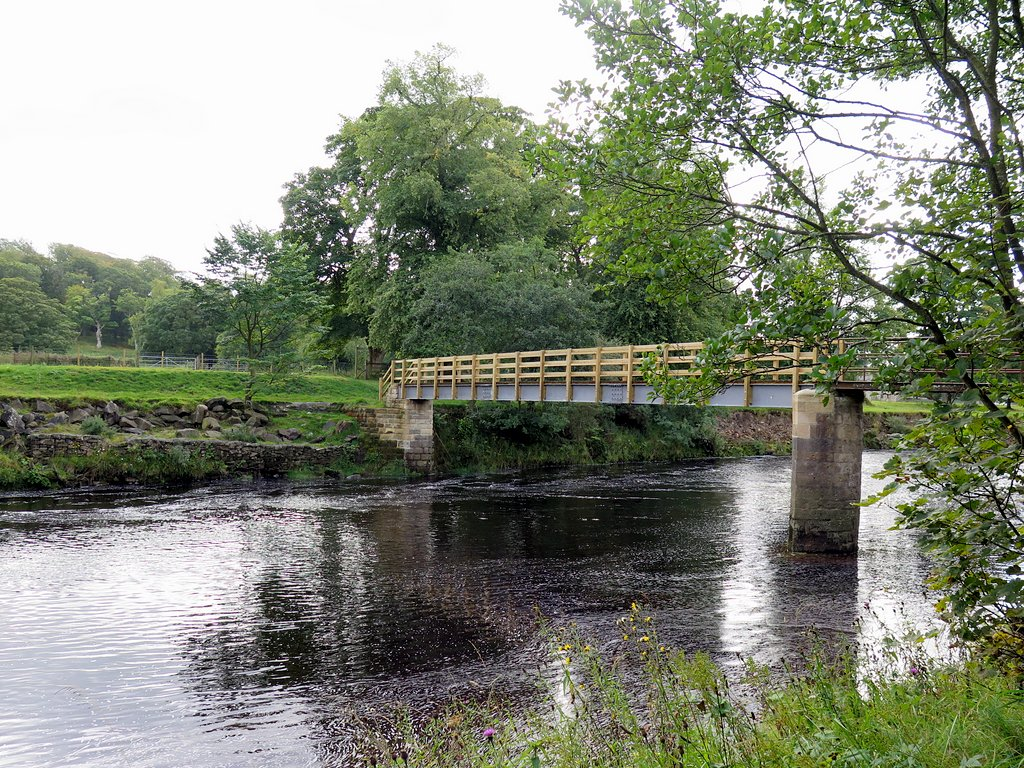
- Featherstone Castle Footbridge, in September 2015
- Coordinates: 54.9506°N 2.5079°W
- OS grid reference: NY672613
- Carried: Pedestrians
- Crossed: River South Tyne
- Locale: Northumberland
- Preceded by: Diamond Oak Bridge
- Followed by: Featherstone Bridge

Characteristics
- Design: Beam bridge
- Material: Steel girder with wooden deck
- Pier construction: Stone
- No. of spans: 2
- Piers in water: 1

History
- Construction end: 1990
- Opened: 1990
- Collapsed: 2014 (Repaired 2015)

Featherstone Castle Footbridge is a wooden-decked girder bridge across the River South Tyne at Featherstone Castle in Northumberland.

== History ==
The present wooden structure, which has stone steps at either end, was erected in 1990 and then extensively repaired following flood damage in 1995. Following further severe flooding in the area, it collapsed again but was repaired in autumn 2015.

Next bridge upstream	River South Tyne	Next bridge downstream
Diamond Oak Bridge; Road and National Cycle Route 68	Featherstone Castle Footbridge; Grid reference NY672613	Featherstone Bridge
