= Millhouse Bridge =

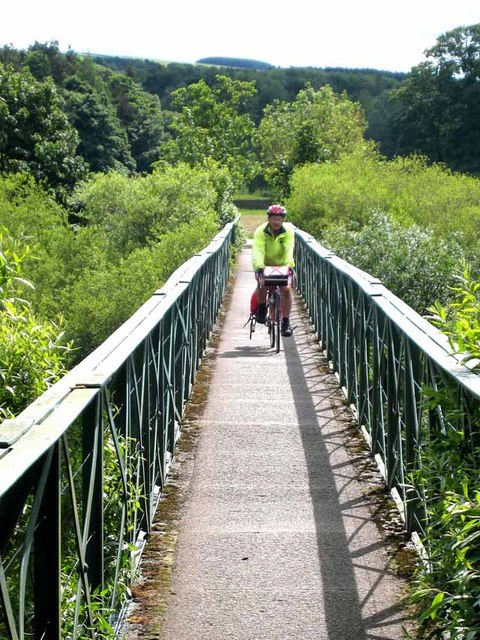
- Millhouse Bridge
- Coordinates: 54.9731°N 2.3429°W
- OS grid reference: NY781643
- Carries: Cycles; Pedestrians
- Crosses: River South Tyne
- Locale: Northumberland
- Other name(s): Bardon Mill Footbridge
- Preceded by: Haltwhistle A69 Bridge, East
- Followed by: Ridley Railway Bridge

Characteristics
- Design: Lattice girder
- Material: Cast iron
- No. of spans: 3
- Piers in water: 2

History
- Opened: 1883

Millhouse Bridge is a footbridge across the River South Tyne at Millhouse, a hamlet just to the south of Bardon Mill in Northumberland.

== History ==
The bridge is of lattice girder design and was constructed in 1883.

Next bridge upstream	River South Tyne	Next bridge downstream
Haltwhistle A69 Bridge, East; A69	Millhouse Bridge; Grid reference NY782644	Ridley Railway Bridge; Tyne Valley line
