= Eals Bridge =

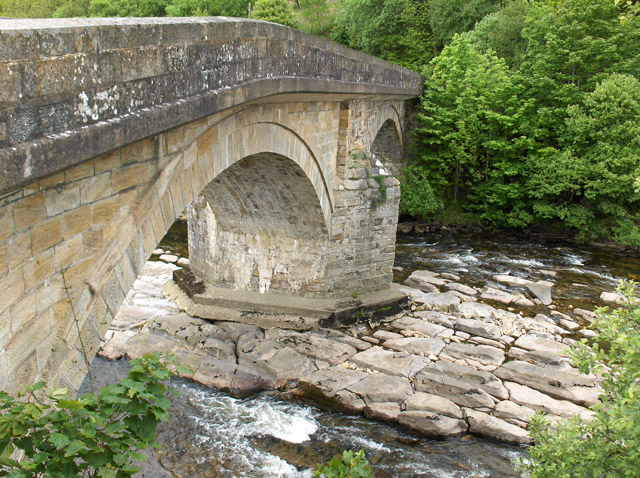
- Eals Bridge
- Coordinates: 54.8917°N 2.4981°W
- OS grid reference: NY682553
- Carries: Motor vehicles
- Crosses: River South Tyne
- Locale: Northumberland
- Heritage status: Grade II listed
- Preceded by: Parson Shields Farm Bridge
- Followed by: Eals Footbridge

Characteristics
- Material: Stone
- No. of spans: 2
- Piers in water: 1
- No. of lanes: Single-track road

History
- Construction end: 1733
- Opened: 1733

Eals Bridge is a stone bridge across the River South Tyne near Knarsdale in Northumberland.

== History ==
This structure has two stone arches and was completed in 1733 but seriously damaged by flooding in 1829. Widened in 1973, it carries road traffic and is a Grade II listed structure.

Next bridge upstream	River South Tyne	Next bridge downstream
Parson Shields bridge	Eals Bridge; Grid reference NY682553	Eals footbridge Footbridge
Next road bridge upstream	River South Tyne	Next road bridge downstream
Parson Shields bridge	Eals Bridge; Grid reference NY682553	Diamond Oak Bridge; Road and National Cycle Route 68
