= Old Haydon Bridge =

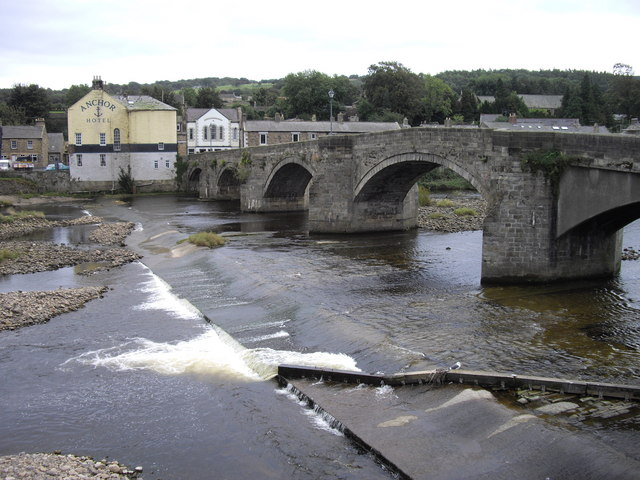
- Old Haydon Bridge
- Coordinates: 54.9730°N 2.2463°W
- OS grid reference: NY843643
- Carries: Cycles and Pedestrians
- Crosses: River South Tyne
- Locale: Northumberland
- Heritage status: Grade II listed
- Preceded by: Haydon Bridge Viaduct
- Followed by: New Haydon Bridge

Characteristics
- Design: Arch bridge
- Material: Stone
- No. of spans: 6

History
- Opened: 1776
- Closed: 1970 to motor vehicles
- Replaced by: New Haydon Bridge

Old Haydon Bridge is a footbridge across the River South Tyne providing access between the Northern and Southern sides of the village of Haydon Bridge, Northumberland, England.

== History ==
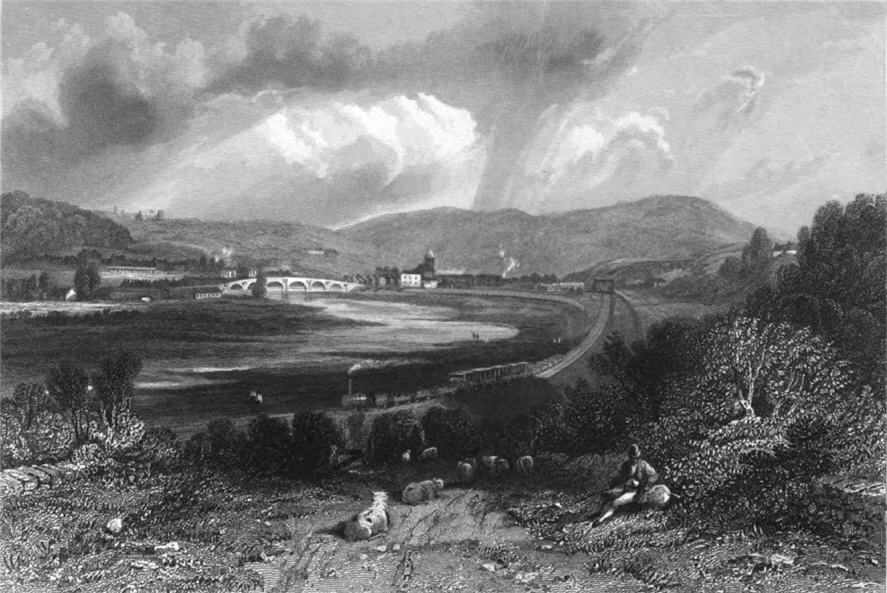
Old Haydon Bridge in January 1837, by James Wilson Carmichael.

The first bridge at Haydon Bridge was built in around 1309, but following the flood of 1771, it had to be rebuilt in 1776. Following structural surveys it ceased to be used by cars and converted to footbridge use only in 1970.

It is listed as a Grade II building by Historic England.

Next bridge upstream	River South Tyne	Next bridge downstream
Haydon Bridge Viaduct; A69 and Tyne Valley line	Old Haydon Bridge; Grid reference NY843643	New Haydon Bridge; A686
