= Featherstone Bridge =

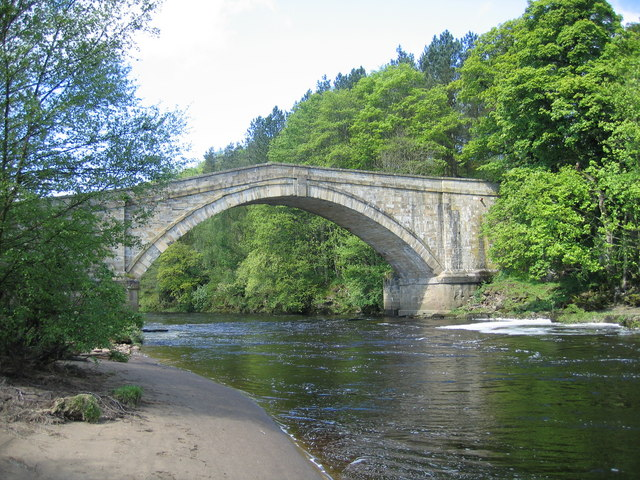
- Coordinates: 54.9506°N 2.5079°W
- OS grid reference: NY675619
- Carries: Motor vehicles
- Crosses: River South Tyne
- Locale: Northumberland
- Preceded by: Featherstone Castle Footbridge
- Followed by: Haltwhistle A69 Bridge, West

Characteristics
- Design: Arch bridge
- Material: Stone
- Width: 4.3 m (14 ft)
- Longest span: 27 m (89 ft)
- No. of spans: 1
- No. of lanes: Single-track road

History
- Construction end: 1775
- Opened: 1775

National Heritage List for England
- Type: Grade II* listed building
- Designated: 10 June 1952
- Reference no.: 1045293

Featherstone Bridge is a stone arch bridge across the River South Tyne at Featherstone in Northumberland.

== History ==
This structure is a stone arch bridge completed in 1775. It is a Grade II* listed structure. There is a plaque above the keystone on inner face of the west parapet displaying the name of the bridge.

Next bridge upstream	River South Tyne	Next bridge downstream
Featherstone Castle Footbridge; Footbridge	Featherstone Bridge; Grid reference NY675619	Haltwhistle A69 Bridge, West; A69
Next road bridge upstream	River South Tyne	Next road bridge downstream
Diamond Oak Bridge; Road and 68	Featherstone Bridge; Grid reference NY675619	Haltwhistle A69 Bridge, West; A69
