= Haydon Bridge High School =

Location
- North Bank; Haydon Bridge; Northumberland, NE47 6LR; England
- Coordinates: 54.97533°N 2.25281°W

Information
- Type: Foundation school
- Local authority: Northumberland
- Department for Education URN: 122328 Tables
- Ofsted: Reports
- Head teacher: Kath Pigdon
- Gender: Mixed
- Age: 11 to 18
- Enrolment: 355 as of October 2019
- Capacity: 904
- Website: www.haydonbridgehigh.co.uk

Haydon Bridge High School is a mixed secondary day school located in Haydon Bridge in the English county of Northumberland. The current headteacher is David Nisbet, who took over in September 2023.

It is a foundation school administered by Northumberland County Council, It is claimed to have the largest catchment area of any school in England, reputedly covering an area larger than that encompassed by the M25, the orbital motorway around London. In April 2016, Ofsted judged the school standards as "below par".

Haydon Bridge High School offers GCSEs and BTECs as programmes of study for pupils, while students in the sixth form have the option to study from a range of A-levels and further BTECs.

== Governance ==
In a report published on 10 December 2014, Ofsted described Haydon Bridge High School as "inadequate", and placed the school into special measures. Reports that followed remained inadequate in reports that were published in 2015 to 2017. In this time, in an attempt to get out of special measures, the school was to be acquired by the Bright Tribe Trust, a multi academy trust, in October 2015. Following this, a new Interim Executive Board (IEB) set up. Despite monitoring reports from Ofsted following the acquisition citing improvements were being made, in November 2017, Bright Tribe pulled out of their sponsorship of the school, as revealed in a blog post via Bright Tribe's official website.

Bright Tribe cited the school's continued financial deficit, and declining pupil numbers as reasons for the pull out, saying that it would impose financial risks on the trust and other schools under Bright Tribe's ownership.

The school remains under local authority control, with a new IEB appointed by the DfE from April 2018.

== Catchment area ==
As of 2016 its catchment area is about 800 square miles (2,100 km^{2}). Greater London is smaller than this catchment area. According to the school, of all of the secondary schools in England, this school has the largest such catchment area. The school, as of 2020, has seven school buses to transport students over longer distances.

== Description ==
Though the school has a capacity for 900 pupils- in 2020 it had 355. The school has been upgraded by Northumberland County Council, Gradon Architecture, Faithful and Gould and Robertson.

== Academics ==
=== The Curriculum ===
The five-year curriculum model requires pupils to engage with a wide range of subjects in Year 7 and 8 and then provides a more bespoke approach through an options programme in Years 9 to 11. ‌

==== Year 7 - 9 ====
In Years 7, 8 and 9, the schemes of work cover the requirements of the national curriculum and build on prior learning. the Year 7 and 8 curriculum is much more than a means of preparing pupils for Years 9 to 11, they offer challenge, enjoyment and success. Alongside Mathematics, English, Science, Religious Studies, PSHE and Physical Education, Year 7 and 8 students study a broad range of non-core subjects. Art, Business and Enterprise, Computing, Drama, French, Geography, History, Music and Technology.

==== Year 10 - 11 ====
The option process, delivers the statutory national requirements and allows pupils choice and flexibility. They follow examination courses that maximise the opportunity for personal success by providing pathways to post 16 education or employment.

All students follow a compulsory core of examination courses in English Language, English Literature, Maths, Biology, Chemistry and Physics. In addition they do non-examined courses in Religious Education, Physical Education and Personal, Social, Health and Economic Education. Together these courses occupy 60% (or 36 out of 60 lessons each fortnight) of the curriculum.

The Optional Subjects are: Art and Design (Fine Art or Photography), Business Studies, Computer Science, Child Development, Engineering, Food Preparation and Nutrition, Geography, Health and Social Care, History, ICT, Music, Performing Arts, Physical Education and Religious Studies. An additional lunchtime and after-school enrichment programme includes a range of sporting activities, art, music and drama.

=== Year 12-13 ===
In the small school 6th Form pupils are offered both academic A Levels and Vocational qualifications at Level 3. The Advanced Level subjects offered, (some taught in joint year 12 &13 groups), are: Art and Design (Fine Art, Photography or Textile Design), Biology, Business Studies, Chemistry, Drama and Theatre Studies, English Literature, French, Geography, History, Mathematics, Music, Physical Education, Physics, Religious Studies, Sociology.

The Applied and Tech Level courses are: Business, Children’s Play, Learning and Development, Health and Social Care, Information Technology, Applied General Science.

== Notable former pupils ==
- Paul Boertien, former footballer
- John Murray, sports broadcaster
- Brad Potts, footballer
