= Haltwhistle A69 Bridge, East =

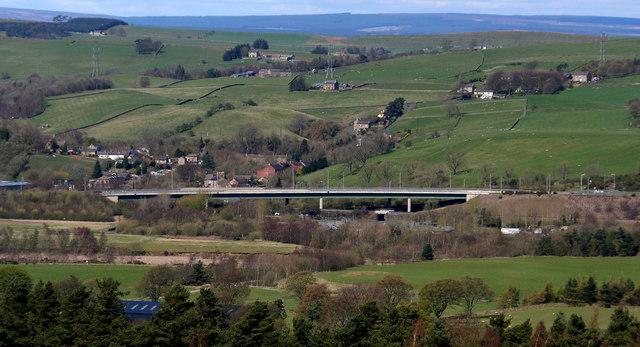
- Haltwhistle A69 Bridge, East
- Coordinates: 54.9658°N 2.4519°W
- OS grid reference: NY711635
- Carries: A69 Haltwhistle bypass
- Crosses: River South Tyne
- Locale: Northumberland
- Owner: Department for Transport
- Maintained by: National Highways
- Preceded by: Alston Arches Viaduct
- Followed by: Millhouse Bridge

Characteristics
- Design: Beam bridge
- Material: Concrete
- No. of spans: 3
- Piers in water: 2
- No. of lanes: 2

History
- Construction end: 1994
- Opened: 1994

Haltwhistle A69 Bridge, East is a concrete bridge across the River South Tyne at Haltwhistle in Northumberland, England.

== History ==
The bridge is a concrete beam bridge that forms part of the Haltwhistle bypass and was completed in 1994. The creation of the bypass allowed the road through Haltwhistle to be de-trunked shortly thereafter.

Next bridge upstream	River South Tyne	Next bridge downstream
Alston Arches Viaduct; Formerly Alston line, now footbridge	Haltwhistle A69 Bridge, East; Grid reference NY711635	Millhouse Bridge; Footbridge
Next road bridge upstream	River South Tyne	Next road bridge downstream
Haltwhistle A69 Bridge, West; A69	Haltwhistle A69 Bridge, East; Grid reference NY711635	Ridley Bridge
