= Haltwhistle A69 Bridge, West =

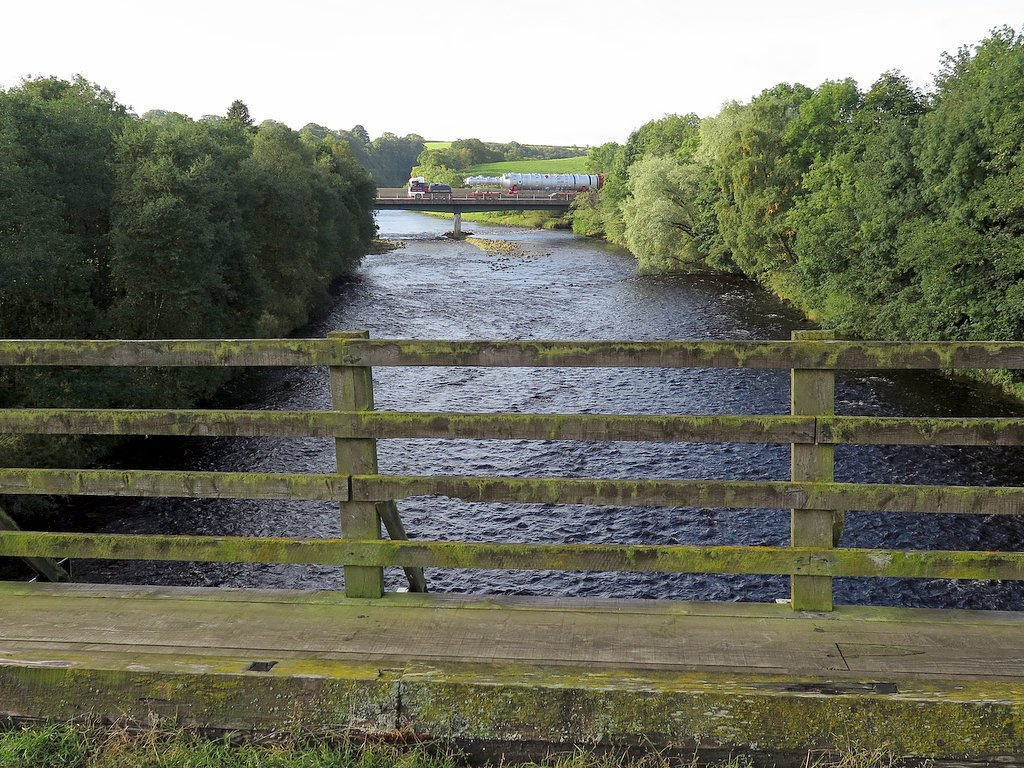
- Haltwhistle A69 Bridge, West (in the distance)
- Coordinates: 54.9627°N 2.4718°W
- OS grid reference: NY698632
- Carries: A69 Haltwhistle bypass
- Crosses: River South Tyne
- Locale: Northumberland
- Owner: Department for Transport
- Maintained by: National Highways

Characteristics
- Design: Arch bridge
- Material: Concrete
- No. of spans: 3
- No. of lanes: 3

History
- Construction end: 1997
- Opened: 1997

Haltwhistle A69 Bridge, West is a concrete bridge across the River South Tyne at Haltwhistle in Northumberland, England.

== History ==
The bridge is a concrete arch bridge, which forms part of the Haltwhistle A69 bypass and was completed in 1997. The creation of the bypass allowed the road through Haltwhistle to be detrunked shortly thereafter.

As well as carrying the A69 road, the bridge has an additional third lane (separated by a concrete safety barrier) to link adjoining minor roads and carry a footpath.

Next bridge upstream	River South Tyne	Next bridge downstream
Featherstone Bridge	Haltwhistle A69 Bridge, West; Grid reference NY698632	Bellister Bridge; Footbridge
Next road bridge upstream	River South Tyne	Next road bridge downstream
Featherstone Bridge	Haltwhistle A69 Bridge, West; Grid reference NY698632	Haltwhistle A69 Bridge, East; A69
