= Philip Llewellin =

Philip "Phil" Llewellin (23 October 1940 – 1 July 2005) was a British journalist and writer. Born in Oswestry, Shropshire, he was educated at Oswestry School and Wycliffe College, Gloucestershire.

== Career ==
After a brief career in insurance, he started in journalism on the Oswestry and Border Counties Advertizer, and later moved to the Shrewsbury Chronicle.

In 1969 he became a freelance writer and one of his first commissions was an article on the musician and actor Tommy Steele for The Observer magazine. His work was eclectic and in the 1970s he contributed to a series of travel guidebooks which built upon his wide-ranging knowledge of the UK and made good use of his love of Wales.

But in time his work focussed increasingly on his passion for cars and motoring. From the late 1960s until his death he worked for a large number of publications in the UK and abroad, including The Observer, Car Magazine, the Daily Telegraph, Truck magazine, The Independent, Car & Driver, and Automobile Magazine.

Although, superficially, most of his writing was about cars it often also touched on aspects of military history, travel and engineering (he was an admirer of Isambard Kingdom Brunel and Thomas Telford). His writing was also noted for its humour.

A collection of his writing, The Road to Muckle Flugga, was published in 2004. In his foreword, Jeremy Clarkson, the journalist and former presenter of BBC Television's Top Gear, wrote "Phil realized that cars were dull. It was what you did with them that mattered."

He was a long-standing member of the Guild of Motoring Writers which has set up an annual Student of the Year award in his memory. Phil was also a member of the Midland Group of Motoring Writers, which has established an annual award in his memory. It asks young writers, aged between 10 and 16, to imagine a journey and the car they would make it in. The prize is £1,000 worth of travel vouchers, a visit to the Aston Martin factory at Gaydon (and passenger ride in one of the cars) and a week's loan of a new Audi to the winner's parents.

He died of a heart attack in 2005 whilst on holiday in Croatia. In a reader's obituary published in The Guardian, Frank Page (motoring journalist), described Phil Llewellin as "one of the best motoring writers, if not the best, of the past four decades."
