= Diamond Oak Bridge =

Bridge in Northumberland, England

- Coordinates: 54.9311°N 2.5076°W
- OS grid reference: NY675598
- Carries: Motor vehicles; 68
- Crosses: River South Tyne
- Locale: Northumberland
- Preceded by: Lambley Footbridge
- Followed by: Featherstone Castle Footbridge

Characteristics
- Design: Beam bridge
- Material: Concrete
- No. of spans: 3
- Piers in water: 2

History
- Construction end: 1975
- Opened: 1975

Diamond Oak Bridge is a concrete bridge across the River South Tyne near Coanwood in Northumberland.

== History ==
The bridge links Coanwood on the east of the River Tyne and Lambley on the west and was completed in 1975. Although designed to remain open in all weathers, it is often impassible under snow conditions.

Next bridge upstream	River South Tyne	Next bridge downstream
Lambley Footbridge; Footbridge	Diamond Oak Bridge; Grid reference NY675598	Featherstone Castle Footbridge; Footbridge
Next road bridge upstream	River South Tyne	Next road bridge downstream
Eals Bridge	Diamond Oak Bridge; Grid reference NY675598	Featherstone Bridge
