= Ridley Hall, Northumberland =

Ridley Hall
- Location in Northumberland

General information
- Location: Northumberland, England
- Coordinates: 54.970883°N 2.321679°W
- OS grid: NY794640

Ridley Hall is an 18th-century country house, now a residential and conference centre, at Bardon Mill, Northumberland. It is a Grade II listed building.

== History ==
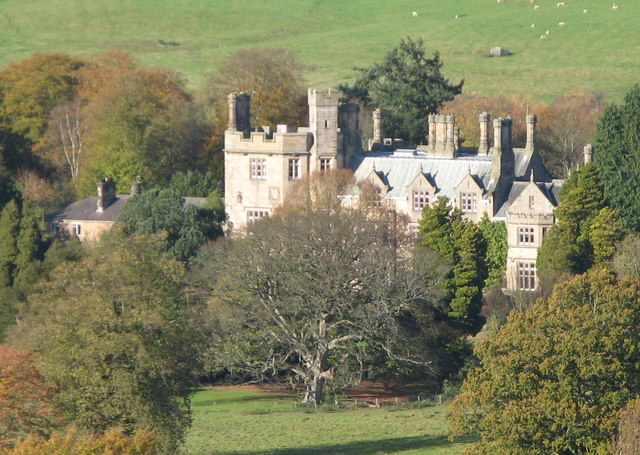
Ridley Hall

A 16th-century house on the site was owned by the Ridley family of Willimoteswick. It was acquired by the Lowes family in the late 17th century and was replaced in 1743 with a new Georgian mansion.

The death in 1795 of John Lowes (High Sheriff of Northumberland in 1790) was followed by that of his son William Cornforth Lowes in 1810 and of his brother in 1812, and in 1818 the house was sold to Thomas Bates of Halton Castle, Northumberland.

In 1830 John Davidson (High Sheriff in 1839), a cousin and beneficiary of the will of William Cornforth Lowes, purchased the house and made substantial improvements to the property. He married Susan Jessup, a daughter of the 9th Earl of Strathmore and Kinghorne, who on her death bequeathed the estate to the art collector John Bowes, a son of her brother John Bowes, 10th Earl of Strathmore and Kinghorne.

The house was rebuilt with a new main block in a neo-Tudor style in 1891 by architect Horatio Adamson for Frances Bowes-Lyon. The 18th-century west wing became the domestic service wing.

The Bowes-Lyon family were not often resident, and in the 20th century the house was sold to the Rev E A Evans and was converted to St Nicolas's preparatory school. In 1961 it joined forces with Hillbrow Preparatory School from nearby Haltwhistle and the Rev E A Evans retired. It was renamed Hillbrow-St Nicolas's for a short while. In 1967 lack of numbers forced the closure of the school. The building was then leased by Northern Counties College of Long Benton, Newcastle upon Tyne and converted into a teacher training college for first year students.

== Present ==
The house is now the boarding wing of Haydon Bridge High School, one of a few state boarding schools. Students who live in or beyond Otterburn stay at Ridley Hall during term-time, with most returning home at weekends. During weekends and school holidays, the hall is open for weddings and conferences, but it is not open to the general public.

Ridley Hall is set on a thirty-three acre estate comprising woodland, playing fields and lawned gardens. The estate borders the Allen Banks, a Victorian garden in a gorge of the River Allen owned by the National Trust. In January 2017 it was advertised for sale with 24 acres for £1.65m.
