= Alston Arches Viaduct =

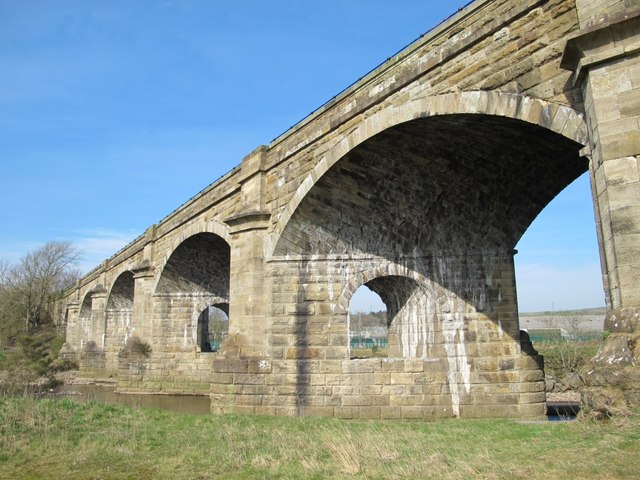
- Alston Arches Viaduct in October 2007
- Coordinates: 54.9664°N 2.4554°W
- OS grid reference: NY709636
- Carries: Cycles; Pedestrians; (Formerly, Alston line)
- Crosses: River South Tyne
- Locale: Northumberland
- Other name(s): Haltwhistle Railway Viaduct
- Preceded by: Blue Bridge, Haltwhistle
- Followed by: Haltwhistle A69 Bridge, East

Characteristics
- Design: Arch bridge
- Material: Stone
- No. of spans: 6

History
- Designer: Sir George Barclay Bruce
- Construction end: 1851
- Opened: May 1851
- Closed: 3 May 1976, as a railway. Reopened as a footbridge in July 2006.

Listed Building – Grade II
- Designated: 27 July 1987
- Reference no.: 1156068

Alston Arches Viaduct, also known as Haltwhistle Viaduct, is a former railway bridge across the River South Tyne at Haltwhistle in Northumberland, north-east England. It was designed by Sir George Barclay Bruce for the Newcastle and Carlisle Railway's Alston branch and opened in 1852. It closed in 1976 and was re-opened for walkers and cyclists in 2006. It is a Grade II listed building.

== History ==
The bridge was built for the Newcastle and Carlisle Railway (NCR) Company to carry its Alston line, a branch line which linked Haltwhistle in Northumberland and Alston in Cumbria. The branch diverged from the Tyne Valley line (the NCR's main line) at Haltwhistle railway station and the Alston Arches was the first significant engineering work on the line. The viaduct was designed by Sir George Barclay Bruce. The line opened in 1851 and began full operation on 17 November 1852 when the viaduct was completed. It closed in 1976. The viaduct was the last major work of the NCR Company before the company was amalgamated into the North Eastern Railway in 1862.

The viaduct is now owned by the North Pennine Heritage Trust, a conservation organisation. It underwent conservation work in the early 21st century and in July 2006 it re-opened as part of a walking and cycling trail. It was officially reopened by the Duke of Gloucester.

== Description ==
The viaduct crosses the River South Tyne just east of Haltwhistle. It consists of six arches (four over the river flanked by two land arches) in rusticated, rock-faced sandstone quarried at Fourstones, further east along the South Tyne. It is on a gradient of 1:100 (climbing from the Haltwhistle direction) and is approached on an embankment. The river spans are skewed, segmental arches, each with a span of 53 feet (16 metres). The land arches are narrower and straight. The piers in the water and on the riverbanks have large, angled buttresses on the outside, which terminate in moulded caps below the parapet level. They rest on high semi-circular cutwaters. The parapet is low and marked with a string course at track level. Round-headed relieving arches are cut into all the piers. There has been some suggestion that these were intended to take a footpath but no such path was ever built and there is no opening on the right bank of the river.

The approach embankment was pierced by the A69 road in 1996 when it was built to bypass Haltwhistle. The viaduct is a Grade II listed building, first designated in 1987, which affords it legal protection. It, along with the nearby Lambley Viaduct, is a National Transport Trust Red Wheel site.

Next bridge upstream	River South Tyne	Next bridge downstream
Blue Bridge, Haltwhistle; 68 and pedestrians	Alston Arches Viaduct; Grid reference NY709636	Haltwhistle A69 Bridge, East; A69
