= Warden, Northumberland =

Village in Northumberland, England

Coordinates: 54.993°N 2.134°W

Warden
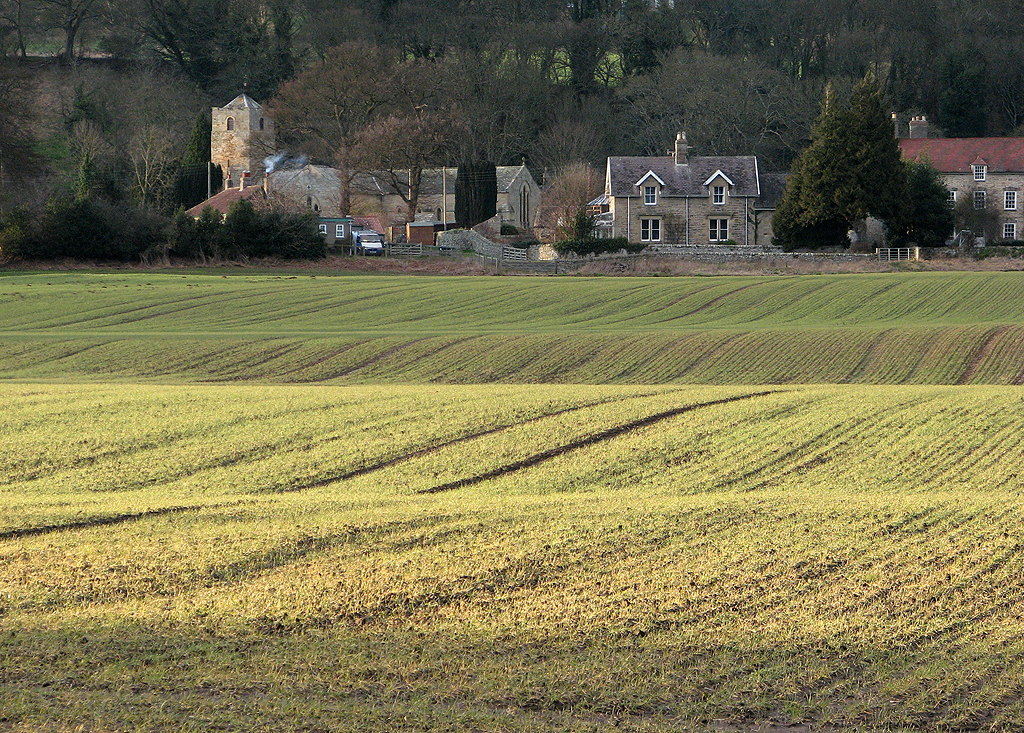

- Location within Northumberland
- Population: 603 (2011)
- OS grid reference: NY915665
- Unitary authority: Northumberland
- Ceremonial county: Northumberland
- Region: North East
- Country: England
- Sovereign state: United Kingdom
- Post town: HEXHAM
- Postcode district: NE46
- Police: Northumbria
- Fire: Northumberland
- Ambulance: North East
- UK Parliament: Hexham

Warden is a village in Northumberland, England about 2 miles (3 km) west of Hexham.

The North and South Tyne meet near the village of Warden. There is a pleasant walk from the Boat Inn along the bank of the South Tyne to the meeting of the waters. The Boat Inn was formerly the site of a ferry until the toll bridge was built across the river. The toll house still stands, but the old bridge was replaced in 1904 by a County structure. The Newcastle and Carlisle Railway crosses the river by a strongly built iron bridge. Warden is dominated by the old motte, now tree covered, and higher still are the earthworks of a prehistoric fort. The church boasts one of the slender Anglo-Danish towers which are a feature of the Tyne valley. The churchyard appears oval in shape, which reinforces the notion of the great age of these Tyne parish centres. A carved stone stands close to the tower, but nothing more is claimed for it than being a "market cross". As, however, there is no record of a market here, inherently unlikely because of the proximity of Hexham market, a better case for its origin may be as one of the boundary crosses marking the sanctuary limits or "frith" of St Wilfrid's church at Hexham. The socket of one such cross survived near the road at Acomb.

From Warden one can see eastwards among the trees which rise on the northern slope of the valley the spire of the Church of St John Lee on high ground at Acomb. It commemorates the hermitage of St John of Beverley, sometime bishop of Hexham (689–705). The present church is no older than 1818–85.

From High Warden, on the hillside, a path leads to a large fortified British camp crowning the hill, which gives a fine outlook over the surrounding country.

== Governance ==
Warden is in the parliamentary constituency of Hexham.

== Economy ==
Warden is situated on a triangle of land between the two Tynes. It had a water mill on the North Tyne and a paper mill on the South Tyne, which started in 1763 and still exists. A century ago a visitor described how the rags were converted into beautiful white paper. The mill employed 63 hands.

== Religious sites ==
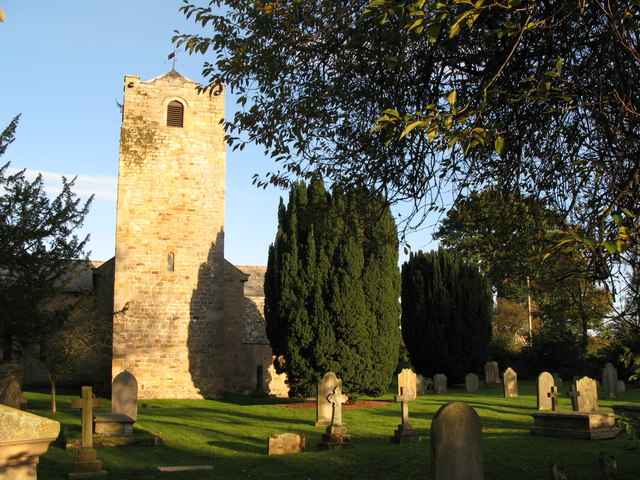
St Michael's Church

The church at Warden is dedicated to St Michael, and has an Anglo-Saxon tower dating back to the eleventh century, and built of Roman stone. Indications are that there was a church earlier than the tower, and in the post Conquest period, another church was added to the tower. The tower arch is built of Roman material, probably from Chesters Roman Fort. Transepts were added in the thirteenth century making the church cruciform in shape. There were alterations in the eighteenth century, and the chancel was rebuilt in 1889. In the chancel is a Norman grave-cover that is the best of its kind in the county. Its shape and tile decoration symbolise a house of the dead. There are a number of incised grave covers in the porch, and a Roman altar that has been carved with Saxon knot-work. It has been split and reversed, possibly "to empty out the devils". An 18th century horsing-stool stands at the church-gate. Three of the bells in the church were cast in 1878 by the Newcastle firm of Cox and Sons.

There is also a Methodist church built in 1851. In appearance it resembles a barn rather than an ecclesiastical edifice.
