= A686 road =

Road in England

A686

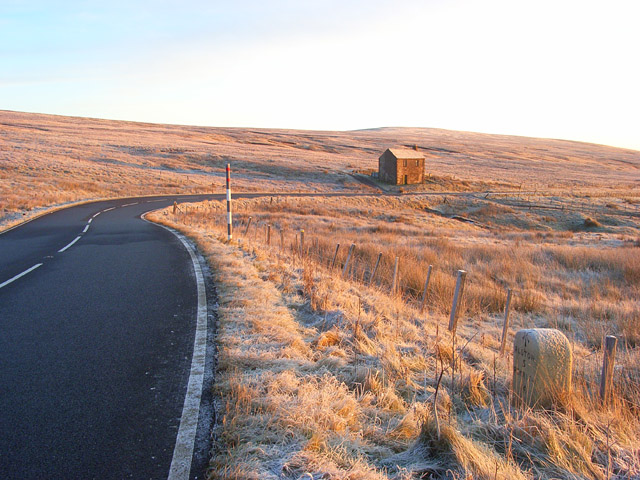
- The A686 looking east below Hartside

Route information
- Maintained by: Westmorland and Furness Council; Northumberland County Council
- Length: 36.5 mi (58.7 km)

Major junctions
- South end: Penrith; 54.6554°N 2.7423°W
- A66; A6 A689; A69
- North end: Haydon Bridge; 54.9730°N 2.2361°W

Location
- Country: United Kingdom
- Constituent country: England
- Towns: Alston
- Villages: Langwathby; Melmerby; Whitfield

Road network
- Roads in the United Kingdom; Motorways; A and B road zones

The A686 is a road in Northern England. It runs from Penrith in Cumbria to Haydon Bridge in Northumberland. AA Magazine named the A686 as one of their "Ten Great Drives" owing to the dramatic scenery of the North Pennines hills encountered along its route. Travel journalist Phil Llewellin said:

England’s great wilderness sprawls across the northern Pennines, where the mountains have fascinating names such as Fiend’s Fell and Wildboar Fell. Penrith merits a visit after leaving the M6, and memories of the motorway fade as the A686 crosses the River Eden valley. The mood changes dramatically in Melmerby, where the road starts its long climb to the cafe at Hartside, 1,900 feet (580 m) above sea level, with stunning views across the Solway Firth and Scotland. The road leads to Alston, which claims to be England’s highest market town, a charming little place with cobbled streets and quaint buildings. The A686 beyond Alston crosses another breathtaking expanse of windswept upland before running down to the River Allen's beautiful wooded gorge.

— Phil Llewellin, via Visit Cumbria

== Route ==
The A686 begins at a roundabout with the A66 road and A6 road on the edge of Penrith, Cumbria, though it originally started in nearby Carleton at a crossroads with the former route of the A66. The road heads in a north-easterly direction crossing the River Eden before going through the village of Langwathby. It continues through Melmerby and across the Pennines before reaching the isolated market town of Alston.

It meets the A689 road (to Brampton and Bishop Auckland) and then crosses the border into Northumberland. It continues past the villages of Ninebanks, Bearsbridge and Whitfield. It meets the B6305 road to Hexham, and 3.1 miles (5.0 km) later terminates at its junction with the A69 road just east of Haydon Bridge.

== Hartside Cafe ==
Unfortunately, England's highest Cafe experienced a severe fire back in 2018 and has since been entirely demolished. There is widespread demand for a re-construction project to take place at this iconic motoring viewpoint, yet plans are yet to get off the ground. Overlooking Cumbria's Eden Valley, with a 20-mile view NW to the Solway Firth on a clear day, this Cafe was once an iconic stopping off point for those travelling across the North Pennines. The view is still spectacular, and motorists still often take a break at the car park.

== Winter ==
During the deep winter, heavy snow and black ice often makes the high points of the A686 treacherous. After heavy snow, the road may be closed.
