= Haydon Bridge =

Village in Northumberland, England

Coordinates: 54.973°N 2.247°W

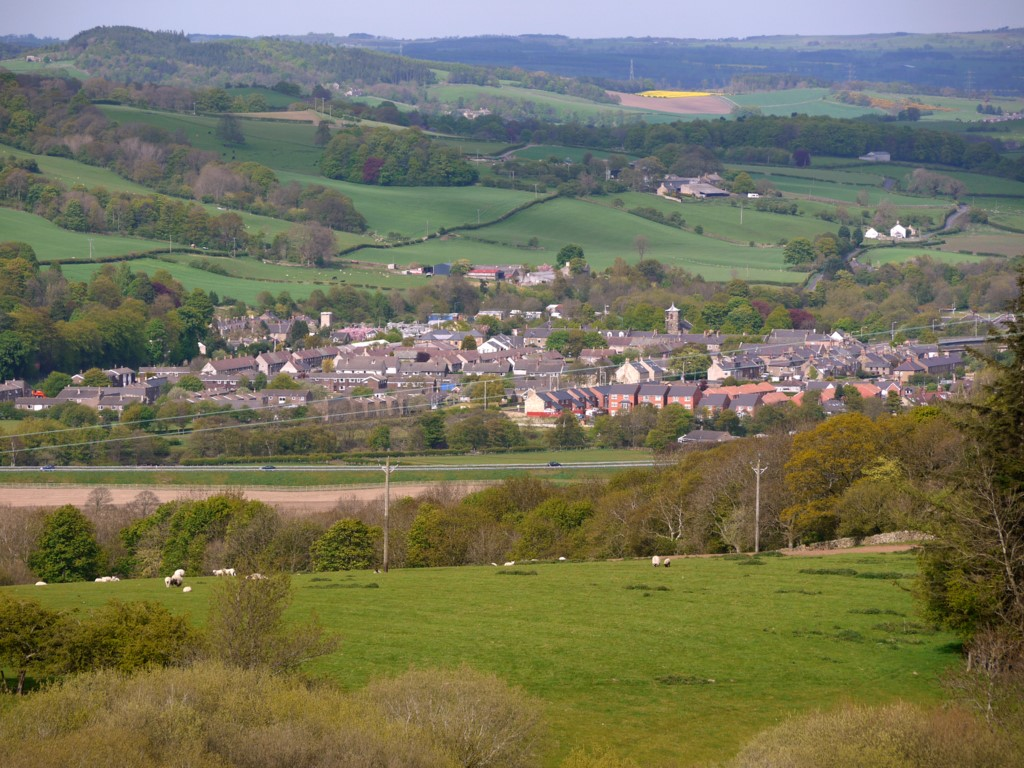
- Haydon Bridge

- Location within Northumberland
- Population: 2,184 (2011)
- OS grid reference: NY842643
- Civil parish: Haydon
- Unitary authority: Northumberland
- Ceremonial county: Northumberland
- Region: North East
- Country: England
- Sovereign state: United Kingdom
- Post town: HEXHAM
- Postcode district: NE47
- Dialling code: 01434
- Police: Northumbria
- Fire: Northumberland
- Ambulance: North East
- UK Parliament: Hexham

Haydon Bridge is a village in Northumberland, England, which had a population of 2,184 in the 2011 census. Its most distinctive features are the two bridges crossing the River South Tyne: the picturesque original bridge after which the village was named (now restricted to pedestrian use) and a modern bridge which used to carry the A69 road. A bypass was completed in 2009 and the A69 now bypasses the village to the south.

The modern village is divided in two by the River South Tyne, whereas the old village (Haydon) was to the north, on the hill overlooking the river; all that remains is a Norman church now reduced in size from the original, which used stone taken from nearby Roman Hadrian's Wall. The A686 road joins the A69 just to the south east of the village, linking Haydon Bridge with Alston and Penrith.

== History ==
In 1323 a Charter was granted for a market and fair to be held in the village, but as these gatherings so often ended in brawls between various families they did not add to the peace of the district. In October 1587, a raid into Tynedale by 400 Scottish attackers led by Kinmont Willie Armstrong, led to the partial destruction of Haydon Bridge

== Governance ==
Haydon Bridge is in the parliamentary constituency of Hexham. Joe Morris of the Labour Party is the Member of Parliament.

For local government purposes it belongs to Northumberland County Council a unitary authority.

== Economy ==
The village has four pubs and two hotels.

A few years ago the 'old foundry' as locals called it (based on its earlier use as an ironworks established in 1843) was demolished to make way for new accommodation specifically for past and present Haydon Bridge residents. The new flats are modern buildings designed to fit in with the rest of the architecture of the village.

== Schools ==
There are two schools: Wise Shaftoe Trust Academy and Haydon Bridge High School.

== Ecology ==
The Haydon Bridge area plays host to a variety of different species, most notably the elusive red squirrel. However grey squirrels are moving through the area and the group Haydon Bridge Red Squirrels was set up to combat this and preserve the threatened red squirrel.

== Transport ==
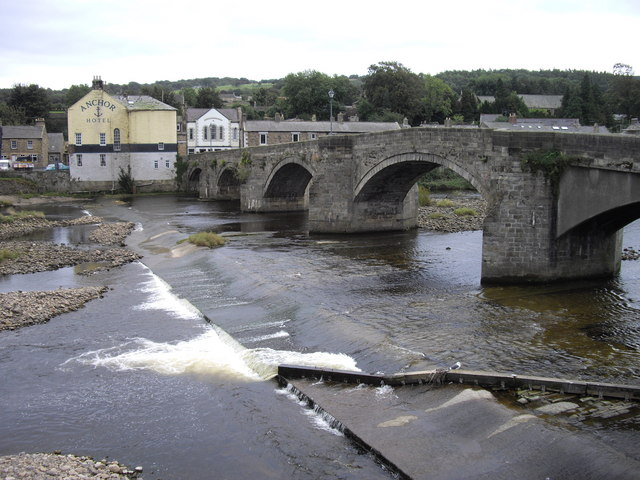
Old Haydon Bridge

=== Road ===
Old Haydon Bridge across the River South Tyne within the village itself was originally built around 1309 but had to be rebuilt in 1776 following a flood. Listed as a Grade II structure it is now available only to pedestrians.

The new Haydon Bridge Bypass, opened in 2009, now carries the A69 across the river and railway some half a mile to the west of the village.

=== Railway ===
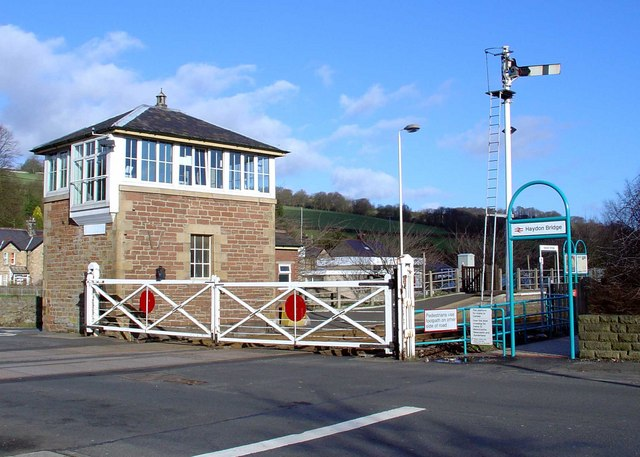
Haydon Bridge railway station

The village is served by Haydon Bridge railway station on the Tyne Valley line. The line was opened in 1838 by the Newcastle & Carlisle Railway linking Newcastle with Carlisle. The line follows the course of the River Tyne through Northumberland. Passenger services on the Tyne Valley line are operated by Northern.

=== Bus services ===
Stagecoach operate bus service 685 daily between Carlisle and Newcastle although not all journeys operate the full route. This service was previously a joint service with Arriva.

Wright Bros Coaches currently provides a limited service to destinations such as Hexham, Newcastle, Alston, and Nenthead.

=== Air ===
Newcastle Airport is situated about 27 miles (43 km) from Haydon Bridge and provides daily internal flights to many UK and International destinations.

== Religious sites ==
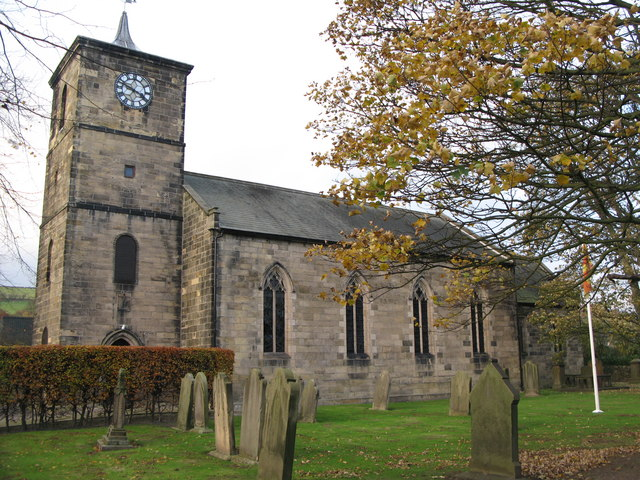
St Cuthbert's, Haydon Bridge

The village where the "new" church is and on which the old church at Haydon looks down, was built in 1796. Dedicated to St. Cuthbert, it is said to have been one of the many resting places of the bones of the saint, which the monks carried throughout the northern counties for hundreds of years. Occasionally services are held in the old church in which, oddly enough, the font is made from a Roman altar. There is a great deal of doubt as to when this little church was originally built; if the bones of St. Cuthbert rested there, it must have been in existence before the saint found his last resting place in Durham Cathedral in 995.

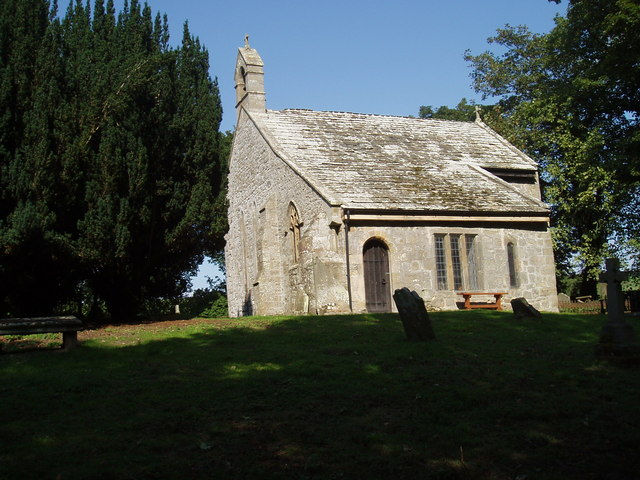
Haydon Old Church

There is a gruesome legend connected with the old church, given in detail in William Lee's Haydon Bridge and District. It is the old story of the girl who longed for finery which she could not afford. Watching the local tailor making a coat for her master at Altonside Farm, the girl pestered the tailor so much that at length he made a bargain with her. If she would go to the old church at Haydon at midnight and bring back the communion book from the altar, he would make her a coat which would enhance her charms in the eyes of her lover. Accordingly, the girl carried out her share of the bargain, but, as she was leaving the church, she heard voices, and hiding behind the door she saw two men dragging what appeared to be a woman's body into the church and burying it under the flagstones. Running out of the church towards her home, the girl tripped and fell, and on recovering herself she saw by the light of the moon that she had tripped over what is described in the story as a "bowarrow", which she recognized as that of her lover! The next night when he came to visit her she showed him the incriminating evidence, at which he trembled like "an aspen leaf" and dramatically said "I bid you farewell, a long farewell". So the girl gained a new coat but lost her lover.

== Arts ==
Every year Haydon Bridge now has a Summer Exhibition held in the community centre. This displays work of artists and photographers local to the village such as Elaine Westall and wildlife photographer Will Nicholls. This event is usually held in June or July.

There is also an Arts and Crafts fair later in the year, in the same venue, where photographers, wood craftsmen, jewelers and more will sell their products to anyone who visits.

== Notable people ==
- John Martin, painter of biblical destruction, was born in Haydon Bridge at East Land Ends. His dramatic The Destruction of Sodom and Gomorrah can be seen in the Laing Art Gallery in Newcastle upon Tyne.
- Ned Coulson was another celebrity of Haydon Bridge, noted for his wonderful swiftness of foot. On one occasion he won a race against a rider on horseback. Coulson was of Kenyan descent.
- Philip Larkin would spend holidays with Monica Jones at 1A Ratcliffe Road: the cottage she once owned. One of his better-known later poems, Show Saturday, is dedicated to the 1973 Bellingham Show, which they attended. They also went to the tar barrel ceremony in Allendale, and dined at Blanchland. It was a record of Tommy Armstrong's Trimdon Grange Explosion that Larkin heard at the cottage that prompted him to write his own late poem The Explosion.

== Sources ==
- Grundy, John (2022). History of Northumberland. Newcastle upon Tyne: Tyne Bridge Publishing. ISBN 9781838280970.
