= Hexham =

Town and civil parish in Northumberland, England

- Town
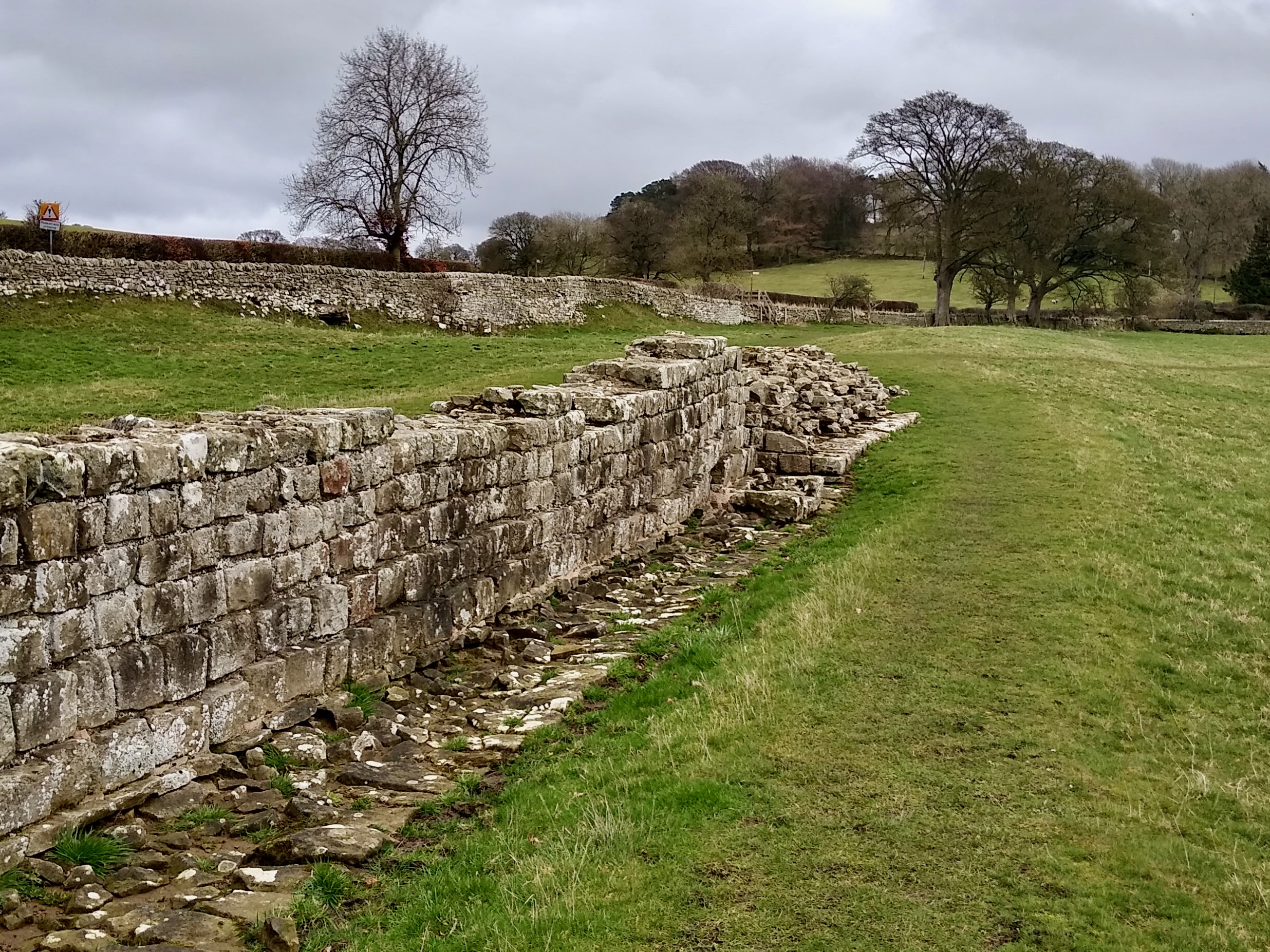
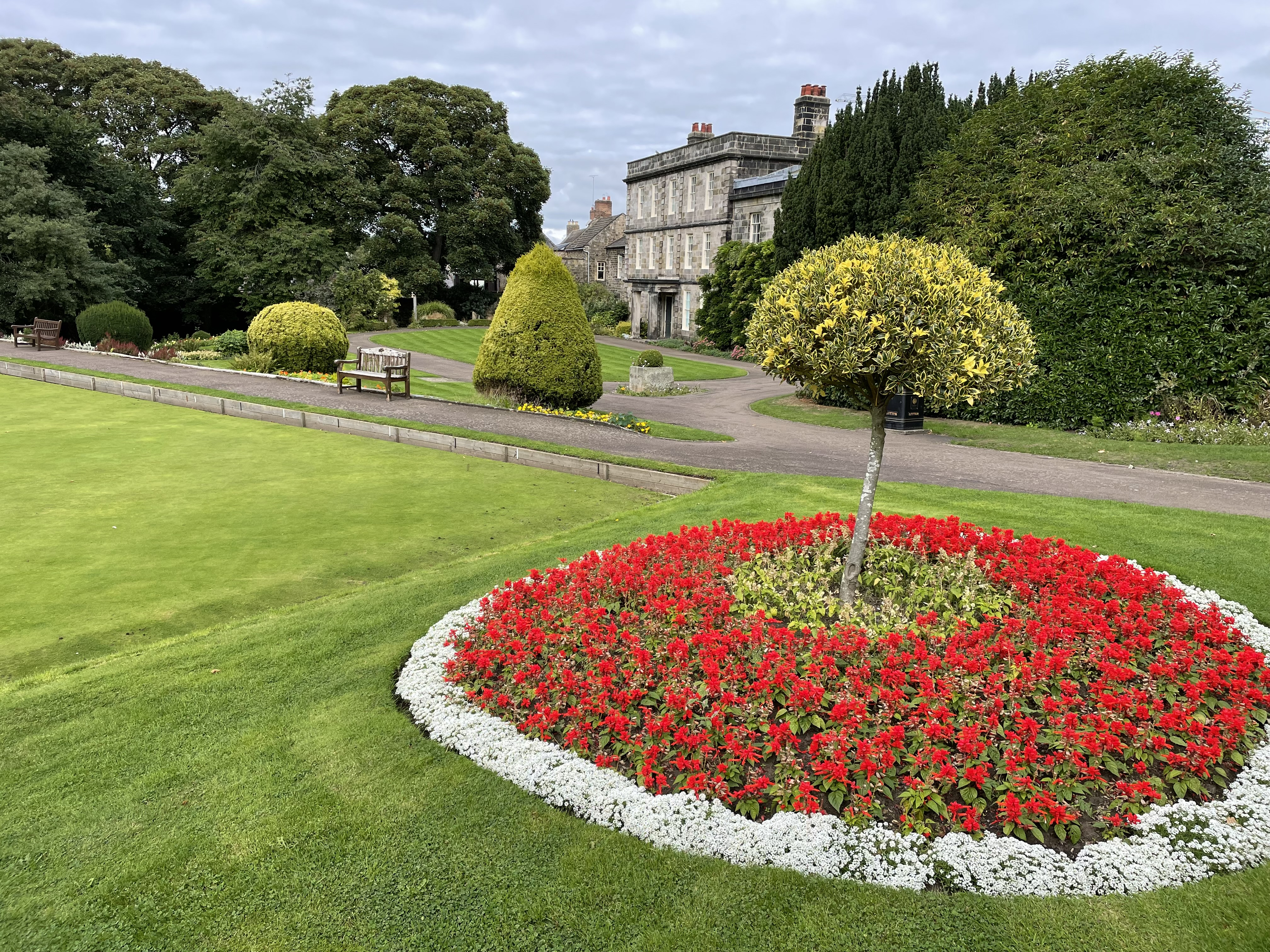
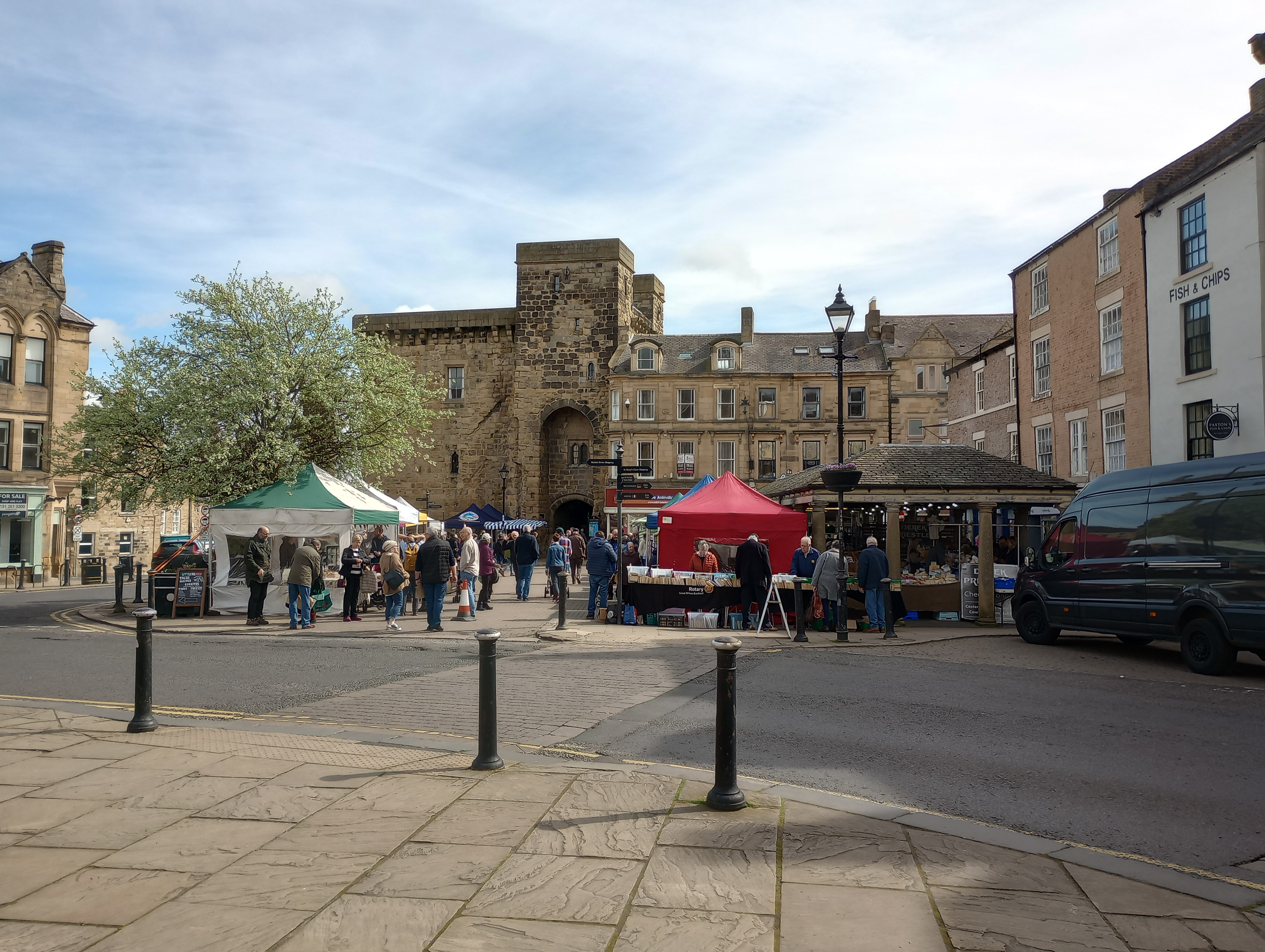
- Hexham Abbey Old Gaol Hadrian’s Wall Hexham House Farmers’ Market

- Coat of Arms of Hexham

- Location within Northumberland
- Population: 11,829 (2011)
- OS grid reference: NY9363
- Civil parish: Hexham
- Unitary authority: Northumberland
- Ceremonial county: Northumberland
- Region: North East
- Country: England
- Sovereign state: United Kingdom
- Post town: HEXHAM
- Postcode district: NE46–NE48
- Dialling code: 01434
- Police: Northumbria
- Fire: Northumberland
- Ambulance: North East
- UK Parliament: Hexham

Hexham (/ˈhɛksəm/ HEKS-əm) is a market town and civil parish in Northumberland, England, on the south bank of the River Tyne, formed by the confluence of the North Tyne and the South Tyne at Warden nearby, and close to Hadrian's Wall. Hexham was the administrative centre for the Tynedale district from 1974 to 2009. In 2011, it had a population of 13,097.

Smaller towns and villages around Hexham include Corbridge, Riding Mill, Stocksfield and Wylam to the east, Acomb and Bellingham to the north, Allendale to the south and Haydon Bridge, Bardon Mill and Haltwhistle to the west. Newcastle upon Tyne is 25 miles (40 km) to the east and Carlisle 37 miles (60 km) to the west.

== Toponymy ==
There are several theories surrounding the origin of Hexham's name. One popular theory posits that the name derives from the Old English Hagustaldes ea and later Hagustaldes ham from which the modern form (with the "-ham" element) derives. Hagustald is related to the Old High German hagustalt, denoting a younger son who takes land outside the settlement; the element ea means "stream" or "river" and ham is the Old English form of the Modern English "home" (and the Scots and Northern English "hame"). A credible suggestion for the modern form Hexham, however, derives from Hextildesham, the later medieval name for the town, believed to have originated in the 12th century in honour of Hextilda of Tynedale (1122 – 1182), the wife of the Scottish nobleman Richard Comyn, who gave considerable land grants to the monks of Hexham.

== History ==
In 671/672, Saint Wilfrid was given the site for a church at Hexham by Northumbrian queen Æthelthryth. Hexham Abbey originated as a monastery founded by St Wilfrid in 674. The crypt of the original monastery survives, and incorporates many stones taken from nearby Roman ruins, probably Corbridge or Hadrian's Wall.

The Anglo-Saxon Chronicle (Manuscript D: Cotton Tiberius B IV) records the murder of King Ælfwald by Sicga at Scythlecester (which may be modern Chesters) on 23 September 788:

This year Alfwald, king of the Northumbrians, was slain by Siga, on the ninth day before the calends of October; and a heavenly light was often seen on the spot where he was slain. He was buried at Hexham in the church.
Her wæs Alfwald Norðhymbra cyning ofslægen fram Sigan on .viiii. Kalendas Octobris, 7 heofonlic leoht wæs lome gesewen þær þær he ofslægen wæs, 7 he wæs bebyrged on Hagustaldesee innan þære cyrican.

Like many towns in the Anglo-Scottish border area and adjacent regions, Hexham suffered from the border wars between the kingdoms of Scotland and England, including attacks from William Wallace who burnt the town in 1297. In 1312, Robert the Bruce, King of Scotland, demanded and received £2000 from the town and monastery in order for them to be spared a similar fate. In 1346 the monastery was sacked in a later invasion led by King David II of Scotland.

In 1464, during the Wars of the Roses, the Battle of Hexham was fought somewhere to the south of the town; the actual site is disputed. The defeated Lancastrian commander, Henry Beaufort, 3rd Duke of Somerset, was executed in Hexham marketplace. There is a legend that Queen Margaret of Anjou took refuge after the battle in what is known as The Queen's Cave, where she was accosted by a robber; the legend formed the basis for an 18th-century play by George Colman the Younger (The Battle of Hexham); but it has been established that Queen Margaret had fled to France by the time the battle took place. The Queen's Cave in question is on the south side of the West Dipton Burn, to the southwest of Hexham.

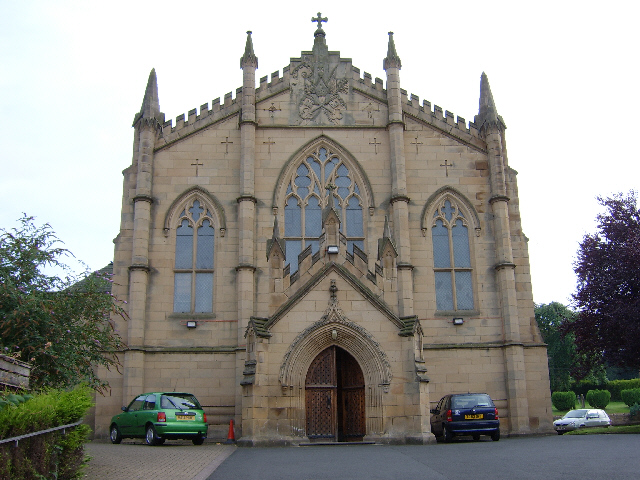
St Mary's Roman Catholic Church, Hexham

Until 1572, Hexham was the administrative centre of the former Liberty or Peculiar of Hexhamshire.

In 1715, James Radclyffe, 3rd Earl of Derwentwater, raised the standard for James Francis Edward Stuart in Hexham Market place.

"Hexham" was used in the Borders as a euphemism for "Hell". Hence the term "To Hexham wi' you an' ye’r whussel!", recorded in 1873, and the popular expression "Gang to Hexham!". "Hexham-birnie" is derived from the term and means "an indefinitely remote place".

=== Hexham riot ===
In 1761, the Hexham Riot took place in the Market Place when a crowd protesting about changes in the criteria for serving in the militia were fired upon by troops from the North York Militia. Some 45 protesters were killed, earning the Militia the sobriquet of The Hexham Butchers.

== Notable buildings ==
Hexham's architectural landscape is dominated by Hexham Abbey. The current church largely dates from c. 1170–1250, in the Early English Gothic style of architecture. The choir, north and south transepts and the cloisters, where canons studied and meditated, date from this period.

The Moot Hall

The abbey stands at the west end of the market place, which is home to the Shambles, a covered market built by Sir Walter Blackett in 1766; it is a Grade II* listed building. At the east end of the market place stands the Moot Hall, originally commissioned as a gatehouse that was part of the defences of the town. The Moot Hall, which is considered one of the best examples of a medieval courthouse in the north of England, is a Grade I listed building. The Old Gaol, behind the Moot Hall on Hallgates, was one of the first purpose-built jails in England. It was built between 1330 and 1333 and is a Grade I listed building.

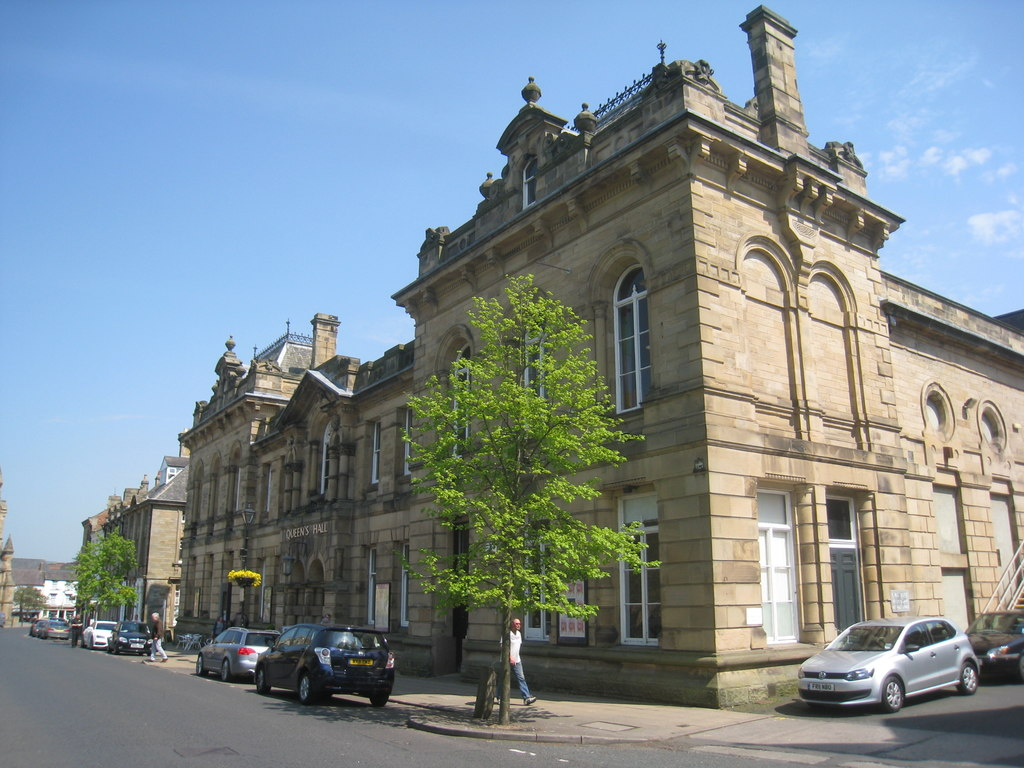
The Queen's Hall

Hexham Library and the Queen's Hall Art Centre can both be found in the Queen's Hall, completed in 1866. The building contains the Brough Local Studies Collection which is the second-largest local history collection in the county.

The Leazes on Shaws Lane is a Grade II listed mansion built in 1853 by John Dobson for William Kinsopp. Dare Wilson Barracks, the home of X Company, 5th Battalion, The Royal Regiment of Fusiliers, was completed in 1891. The former gardens of three houses in the centre of the town, Abbey House, Hexham House and Sele House, now form a group of public parks, which is listed at Grade II on the Register of Historic Parks and Gardens of Special Historic Interest in England.

== Governance ==
Hexham is in the parliamentary constituency of Hexham. Joe Morris has been the Labour member of parliament for Hexham since July 2024. The town comes under Northumberland County Council and contains three wards: Hexham Central with Acomb, Hexham East and Hexham West.

== Local media ==
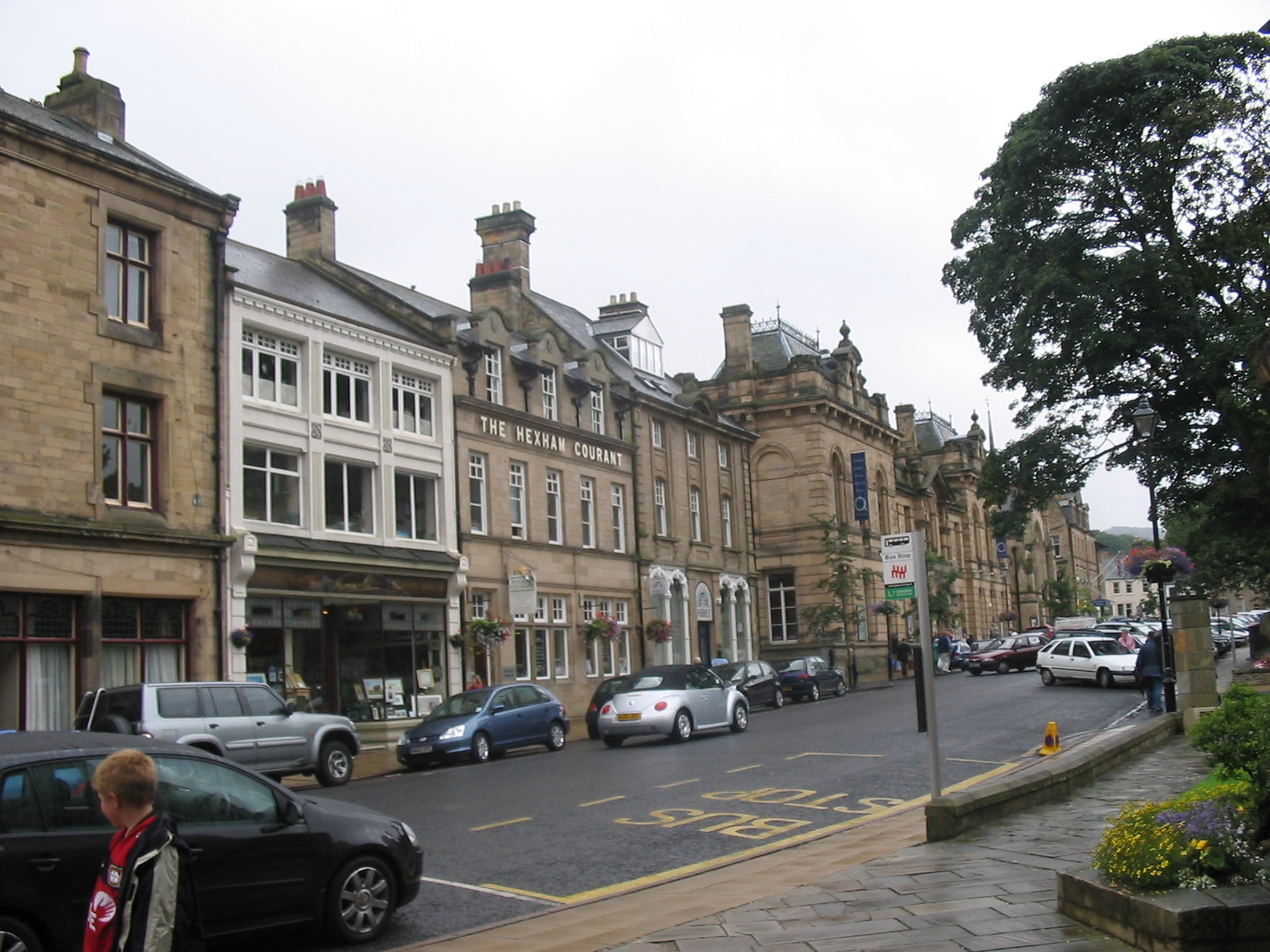
Beaumont Street in Hexham with the Courant offices

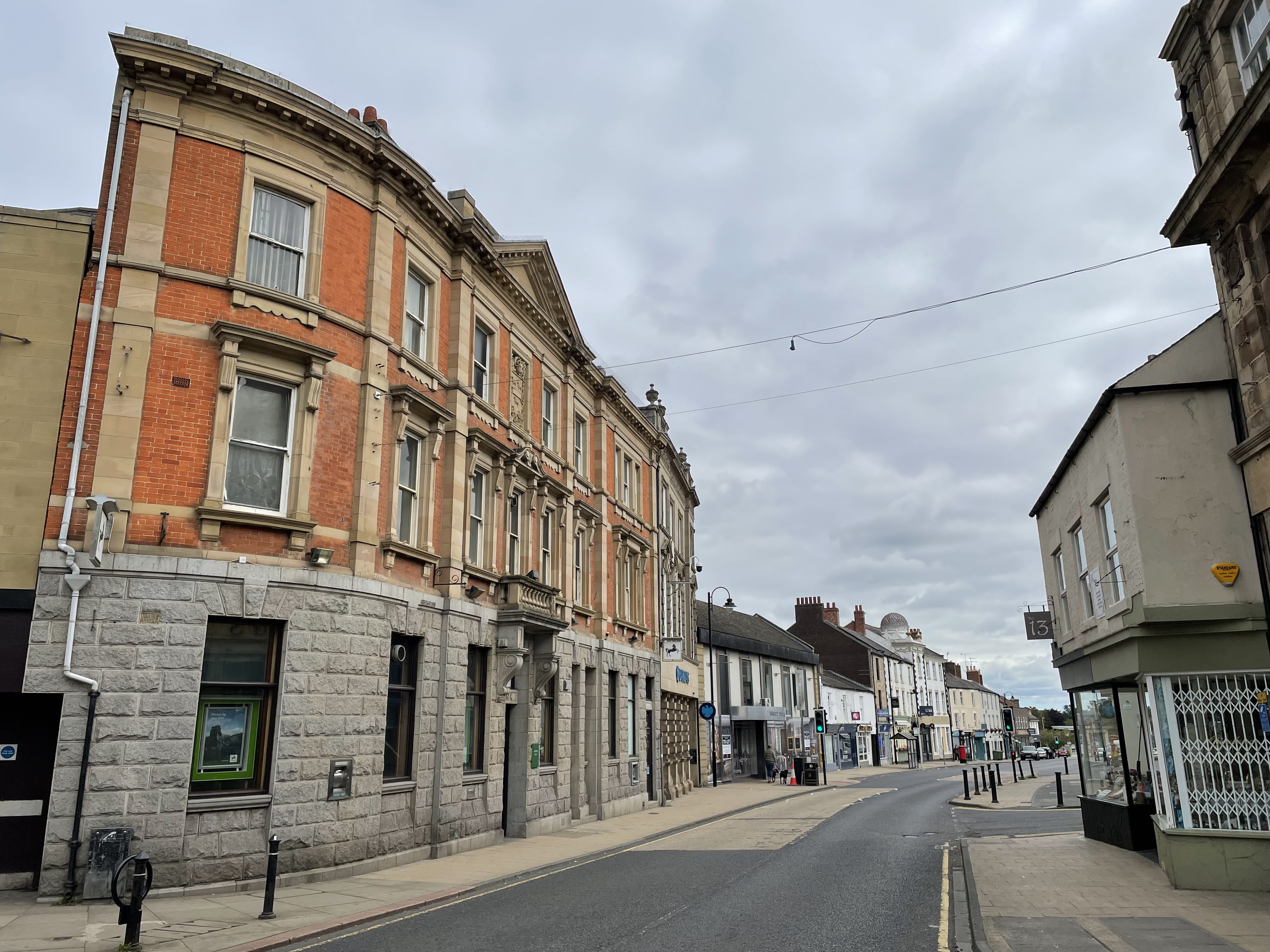
Priestpopple street

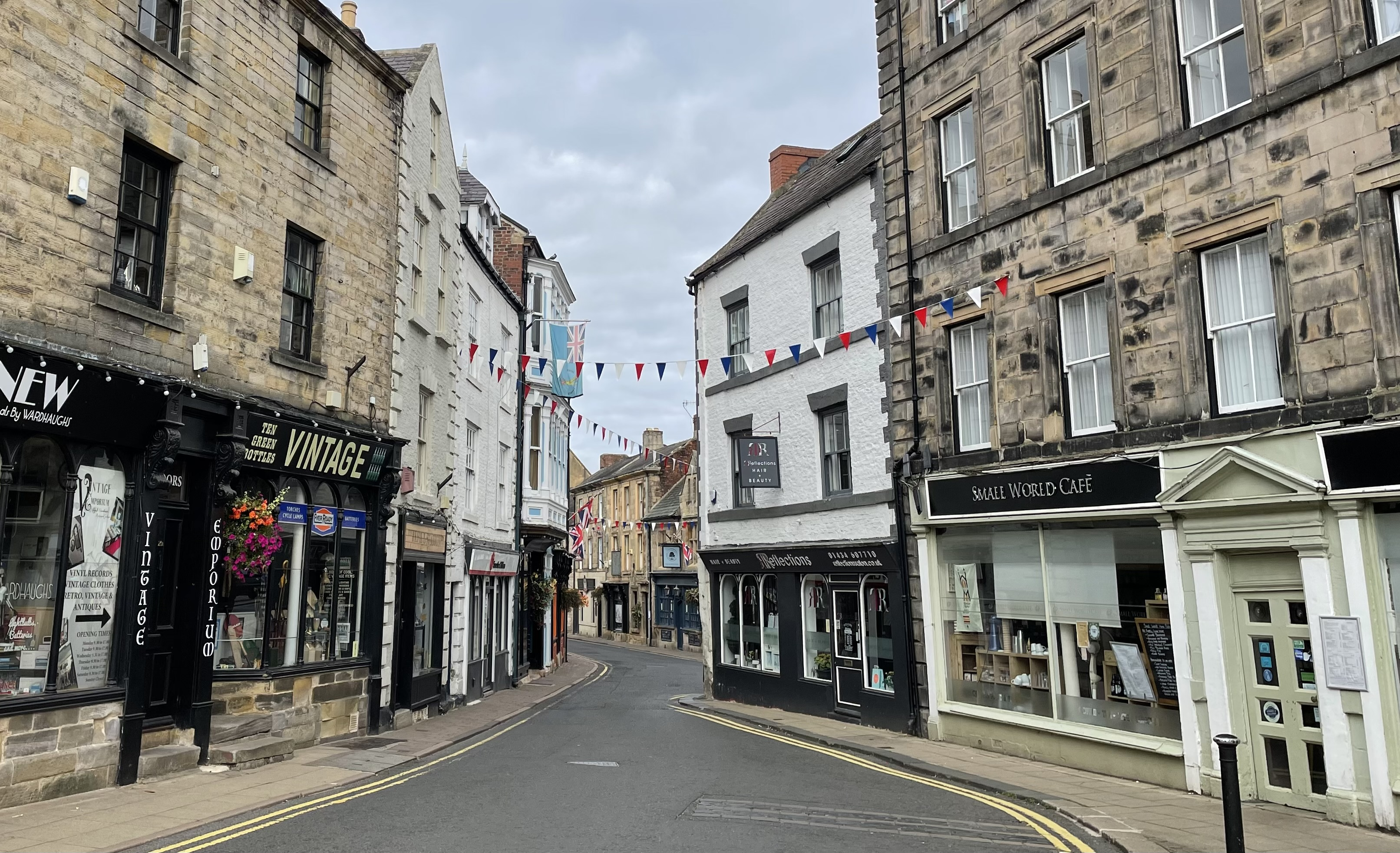
Market Street in the old centre

The Hexham Courant is the local newspaper, serving Hexham and Tynedale since 1864. It was first launched by J. Catherall & Co., and at that time espoused the Liberal cause. It later absorbed the Conservative-supporting Hexham Herald. In 1977, CN Group acquired the newspaper. The Courant office is no longer open in Hexham.

Local news and television programmes are provided by BBC North East and Cumbria and ITV Tyne Tees.

Hexham's local radio stations are BBC Radio Newcastle on 103.7 FM, Capital North East on 105.8 FM, Heart North East on 96.4 FM, Smooth North East on 101.2 FM and Hits Radio North East on 103.2 FM.

Horse racing from the town's course on Yarridge Heights is regularly featured on telecasts by Racing UK and other selected broadcasters. Regular sound broadcasts of cricket commentary for Tynedale CC can be heard via the internet during summer on Spreaker Internet Radio.

== Education ==
Hexham is served by state first, middle and high schools and uses the three-tier system as does the rest of Northumberland. Queen Elizabeth High School, partly located in a former hydropathic hotel, is the town's major educational centre. The nearest private school is Mowden Hall School, a prep school located 10 miles (16 km) away in Stocksfield.

== Transport ==
=== Air ===
The nearest airport to Hexham is Newcastle International Airport, which is located around 20 miles (32 km) away by road. Carlisle Lake District Airport and Teesside International Airport are located around 32 and 58 miles (51 and 93 km) away by road, respectively.

=== Rail ===
The town is served by Hexham railway station on the Tyne Valley Line. It is situated on part of the original Newcastle and Carlisle Railway route, dating back to 1837, which links the cities of Newcastle upon Tyne and Carlisle. The line follows the course of the River Tyne through Northumberland.

Services on the Tyne Valley Line are currently operated by Northern Trains. As of the December 2019 timetable change, the station is served by a twice-hourly service heading west towards Carlisle, and three trains per hour heading east towards Newcastle.

=== Road ===
Hexham is served by the A69 road, which runs for 54 miles (87 km) from Carlisle to Newcastle upon Tyne. This road serves as an alternative to the original route, the A695, which runs from Hexham to Newcastle upon Tyne, serving Corbridge, Stocksfield, Prudhoe and Blaydon.

=== Bus station ===
Hexham Bus Station
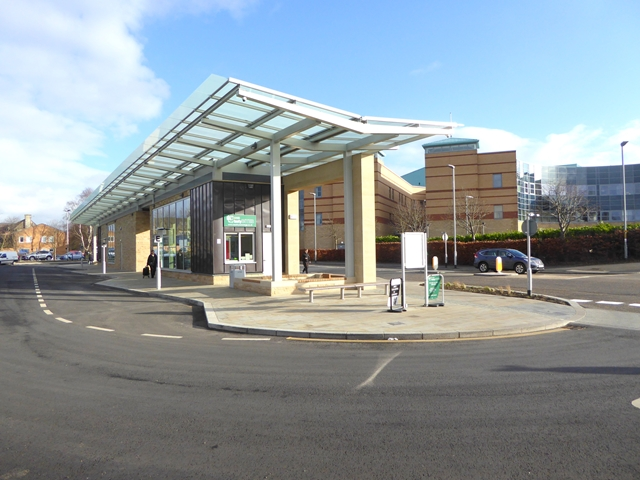

General information
- Location: Hexham, Northumberland; England
- Coordinates: 54°58′13″N 2°05′45″W
- Owner: Northumberland County Council
- Operator: Northumberland County Council
- Bus stands: 5 (A–E)
- Connections: Hexham

History
- Opened: 29 November 2016; 9 years ago
Location
- Location within Northumberland

The original bus station was located at Priestpopple, dating back to the 1930s. In November 2016, the bus station was relocated to its current site at Dene Avenue – at a cost of £2.28 million.

Go North East provide most services in and around Hexham, with local services operating under the Tynedale Links brand. The AD122 tourist bus service operates year-round with increased services during the summer months, serving a number of locations along Hadrian's Wall, as well as the market town of Haltwhistle. Memorably, the route number, AD122, is the date of the building of the wall.

As of September 2024, the stand allocation is:

Stand	Route	Destination
A	10	Newcastle via Corbridge, Riding Mill, Stocksfield, Prudhoe, Crawcrook, Ryton, Blaydon, Metrocentre & Teams
A	683	Hexham General Hospital
A	689	Consett via Dilston, Slaley, Whittonstall, Ebchester, Shotley Bridge & Blackhill
B	684	Newcastle via Corbridge, Ovington, Ovingham, Wylam, Heddon-on-the-Wall, Throckley, Walbottle & Denton Burn
B	685	Newcastle via Corbridge, Horsley, Heddon-on-the-Wall, Throckley, Walbottle & Denton Burn
B	X85	Newcastle express via Corbridge & A69
C	74	Newcastle via Oakwood, Great Whittington, Matfen, Stamfordham, Dalton, Medburn, Darras Hall, Ponteland, Callerton, Westerhope, Slatyford & Cowgate
C	688	Allendale via Langley, Catton, Allenheads, Sinderhope & Sparty Lea
D	683	Beaumont Park
D	685	Carlisle via Haydon Bridge, Bardon Mill, Melkridge, (Note: Some journeys omit Melkridge, running direct via A69.) Haltwhistle, Brampton & Warwick Bridge
D	X85	Leazes
E	680	Bellingham via Acomb, Wall, Chollerford, Humshaugh & Wark
E	682	West Woodburn via Acomb, Wall, Barrasford, Gunnerton, Barrasford Park & Ridsdale
E	683	Haugh Lane Industrial Estate
E	889	Alston via Langley, Staward, Whitfield, Ninebanks, Carrshield & Nenthead
E	AD122	Walltown via Acomb, Wall, Chollerford, Hadrian's Wall, Haltwhistle & Greenhead

== Awards ==
Hexham won the town award in the 2005 Britain in Bloom awards. In the same year, it was also named England's Favourite Market Town by the magazine Country Life.

Hexham was voted the happiest place to live in Britain, 2019 and 2021.

== Economy ==
The major employer in Hexham is Austrian firm Egger. Its chipboard factory vents steam which can be seen from miles away.

Hexham had been long famous for its manufacture of leather. Wright (1823) gives some statistics

77 men & boys employed as Leather dressers and Glove-cutters, 40 boys employed as Dusters and 1,111 women employed as Sewers. Skins dressed annually were 80,000, and 18,000 skins of dressed leather were imported. From these were made and exported annually 23,504 dozens of pairs of gloves. Dutch Oker was used in the processing, but local fell clay could be used if necessary.

Tanning was a necessary allied industry and there were four tanneries, employing a score of men. In a year they dealt with 5,000 hides and 12,000 calf skins. They supplied local saddlers, bootmakers and cobblers.

Hexham also had 16 master hatters, and the trade employed 40 persons. There were two woollen manufactories, worked by steam power, and two rope manufactories. There were corn water mills below the bridge. A windmill on the Sele was ruinous, but there was one still working on Tyne Green. It was, and still is a flourishing market, including a mart for cattle and other farm animals.

In Hexham the Subskimmer was designed and made by Submarine Products.

Botanical brewery Fentimans is based in Hexham.

=== Shopping ===
Hexham has many shops commonly found in other English market-towns, with five central supermarkets, multiple clothes shops, charity shops, banks, estate agents, antique shops and chemists. Cafes and coffee shops are also common in Hexham, from commercial chains to family run independents.

== Sport ==
Hexham's racecourse is at Yarridge Heights in the hills above the town, with National Hunt (steeplechase) races throughout the year.

The town is also home to Tynedale Cricket Club, who play their home matches on Prior's Flat. Founded in 1888, the club has had its most successful period over the most recent 40 years when they dominated the Northumberland County League, before starting the 21st century by winning several championships in the newly created Northumberland & Tyneside Senior Cricket League. In late 2017, Tynedale CC became a founder member of the new Northumberland & Tyneside Cricket League (NTCL), formed when a merger between NTSCL & Northumberland Cricket League was voted through by constituent clubs at the inaugural AGM held at Kingston Park Rugby Ground. This league comprises six divisions with divisions 5 and 6 regionalised into north and south sections.

== Twin towns ==
Hexham is twinned with:

- Metzingen, Germany
- Noyon, France

== See also ==
- Hexham Bridge
- Hexham Old Bridge
- Devil's Water
- Hexham (UK Parliament constituency)
- Ailred of Rievaulx
- Acca of Hexham
- Bishop of Hexham and Newcastle
- Eata of Hexham
- Richard of Hexham
- John of Hexham
- Roman Catholic Diocese of Hexham and Newcastle
- Battle of Heavenfield
- Battle of Neville's Cross
- Robbs
- Hexham Heads

== Sources ==
- Grundy, John (2022). History of Northumberland. Newcastle upon Tyne: Tyne Bridge Publishing. ISBN 9781838280970.
