= National Cycle Route 72 =

Cycle route in the United Kingdom

Coordinates: 54.349535°N 3.406141°W

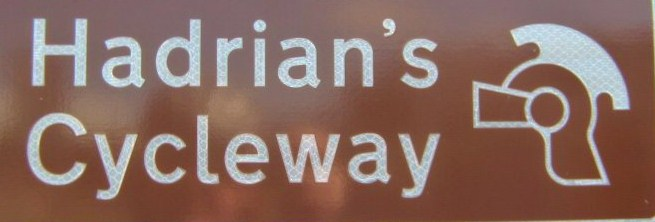
- Hadrian's Cycleway route sign

Hadrian's Cycleway
- Length: 274 km (170 mi)
- Trailheads: Ravenglass; South Shields/Tynemouth
- Highest point: near Bardon Mill, 255 m (837 ft)
- Waymark
- Website: www.sustrans.org.uk/find-a-route-on-the-national-cycle-network/route-72/

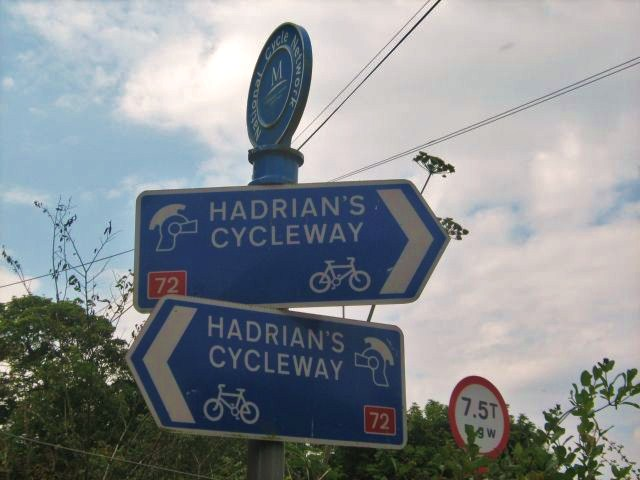
Route Sign NCN 72

National Route 72 of the National Cycle Network, in Northern England is also called "Hadrian's Cycleway". It starts at Kendal and makes its way around the Cumbrian coast via Barrow-in-Furness and Whitehaven to Silloth, and then across the country through Carlisle via Newcastle upon Tyne to Tynemouth at the northern shore or to South Shields at the Tyne's south shore, where the cycleway ends at Arbeia Roman Fort. Much of its route is very close to Hadrian's Wall.

Kendal to Barrow in Furness is mapped on the Walney To Wear map. Ravenglass to Tynemouth is open and mapped on the Hadrian's Cycleway map, though some sections between Ravenglass and Silloth are using interim routes.
