= Corbridge Bridge =

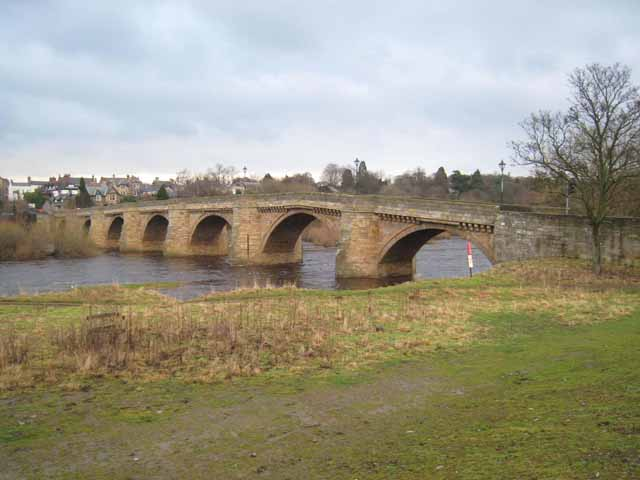
- Corbridge Bridge
- Coordinates: 54.9722°N 2.0188°W
- OS grid reference: NY988641
- Carries: B6321
- Crosses: River Tyne
- Locale: Northumberland
- Heritage status: Grade I listed
- Preceded by: Hexham Bridge
- Followed by: Styford Bridge

Characteristics
- Material: Stone
- Total length: 480 ft (146 m)
- No. of spans: 7
- Load limit: 7.5 tonne
- No. of lanes: Single-track road controlled by traffic lights

History
- Construction end: 1674 or 1690
- Opened: 1674 or 1690

Location
- Interactive map of Corbridge Bridge

Corbridge Bridge is a 17th-century stone bridge across the River Tyne at Corbridge, Northumberland, England, at the point where another structure, eventually a toll bridge, was constructed in the 13th-century. The later, characteristic 7-span structure would be the only bridge on the Tyne to withstand the Great Flood of 1771. As of 2015, it was listed as a Grade I listed building by Historic England.

Earlier, the bridge carried the A68 road over the River Tyne, but since the opening of the Hexham bypass (A69), the A68 has crossed via the Styford Bridge, 3 miles (5 km) downstream of Corbridge.

== Structure ==
The 21st-century bridge, remaining in place from its late 17th-century construction (see below), is of stone, and has a total length of 480 ft (146 m), with its being able, as of this date, to bear a load of 7.5 tonnes.

== History ==
A bridge at Corbridge was built in 1235. In 1298 royal officers went to Corbridge to purchase horseshoes and nails, and a tariff was imposed to raise money for upkeep of the medieval bridge; included in it were tolls on nails of different kinds, horseshoes, cartwheel-sheaths, griddles, iron cauldrons and vats, and the bridge became a great asset to the town. Described in 1306 as the only bridge between Newcastle and Carlisle, it was maintained also as a link between England and Scotland. In either 1674 or 1690 it was replaced by the seven-arched bridge that exists to the present. The reconstructed bridge would be the only one on the Tyne to withstand the Great Flood of 1771. In 1881 it was widened to 3 ft (1 m) without significant alteration to its appearance.

As of 2015, the Corbridge Bridge was listed as a Grade I listed building by Historic England.

=== Current use ===
The bridge had earlier carried the A68 road over the River Tyne, but since the opening of the Hexham bypass (A69), the A68 has crossed via the Styford Bridge, 3 miles (5 km) downstream of Corbridge.

Next bridge upstream	River Tyne	Next bridge downstream
Hexham Bridge; A6079 and 72	Corbridge Bridge; Grid reference NY988641	Styford Bridge; A68
