= Broomhaugh =

Village in Northumberland, England

Coordinates: 54.9482°N 1.9781°W

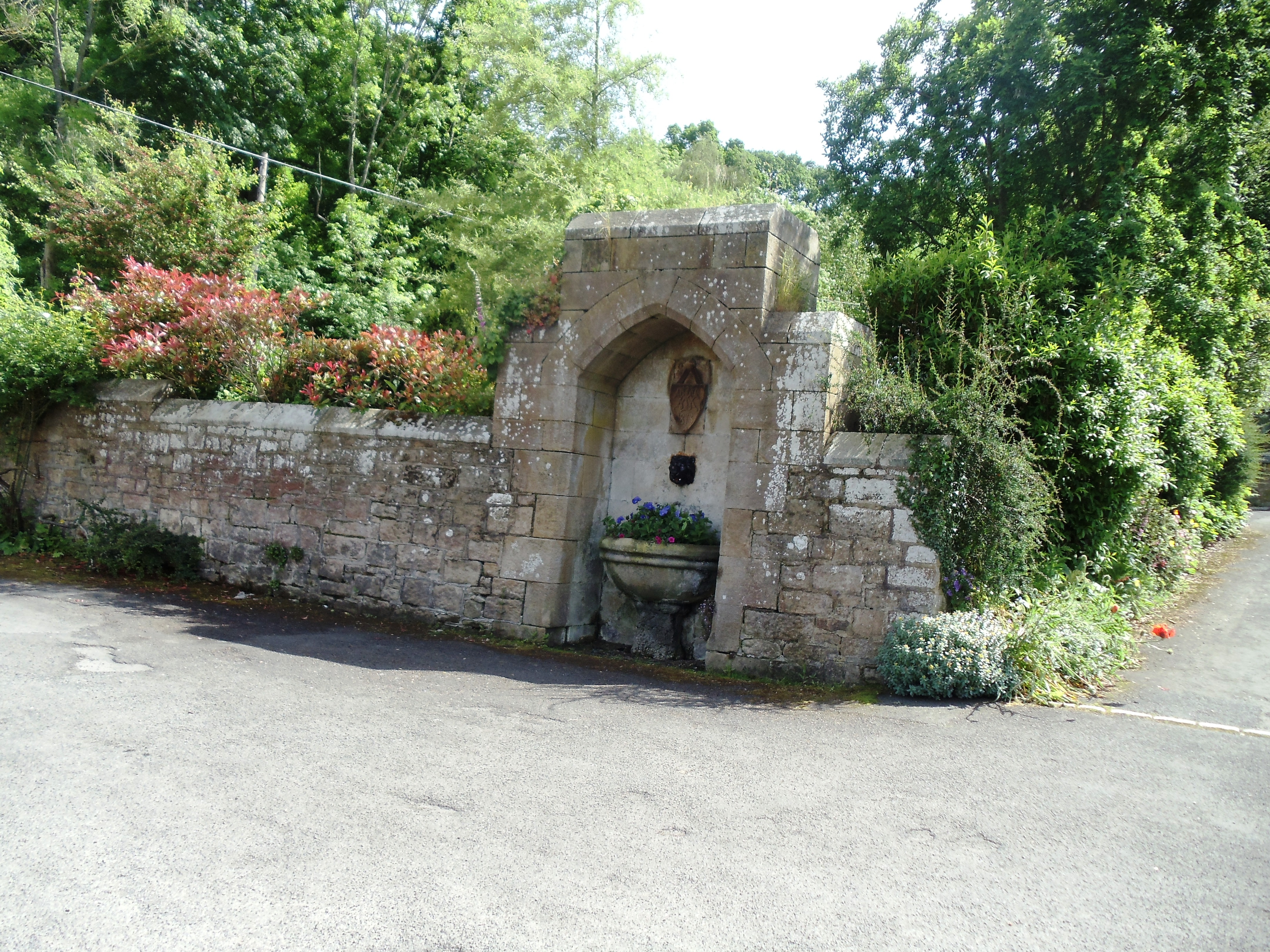

- Location within Northumberland
- OS grid reference: NZ015615
- Civil parish: Broomhaugh and Riding
- Unitary authority: Northumberland
- Ceremonial county: Northumberland
- Region: North East
- Country: England
- Sovereign state: United Kingdom
- Post town: RIDING MILL
- Postcode district: NE44
- Dialling code: 01434
- Police: Northumbria
- Fire: Northumberland
- Ambulance: North East
- UK Parliament: Hexham

Broomhaugh is a village and former civil parish, now in the parish of Broomhaugh and Riding, in Northumberland, England. It is situated between Hexham and Newcastle upon Tyne, to the south of the River Tyne near Riding Mill, and adjacent to the A695 road. In 1951 the parish had a population of 228.

Broomhaugh lies at the eastern edge of the village of Riding Mill. Broomhaugh consists of a mix of stone buildings dating back to the 16th and 17th centuries, an Edwardian terrace and two brick-built terraces linked to the development of the railway between Newcastle and Carlisle. The earlier buildings include a former farm house, farm buildings converted into houses and a Methodist chapel and manse. The majority of the housing is located on what local people refer to as "The Street", which runs down to a former ford across the river Tyne. The Street follows the line of a former drovers' road down which cattle were driven from Scotland to the market towns of northern England.

== Governance ==
Broomhaugh was formerly a township in Bywell-St. Andrew parish, from 1866 Broomhaugh was a civil parish in its own right until it was abolished on 1 April 1955 to form Broomhaugh and Riding.
