= Horsley, Northumberland =

Village in Northumberland, England

Coordinates: 54.993°N 1.853°W

Horsley
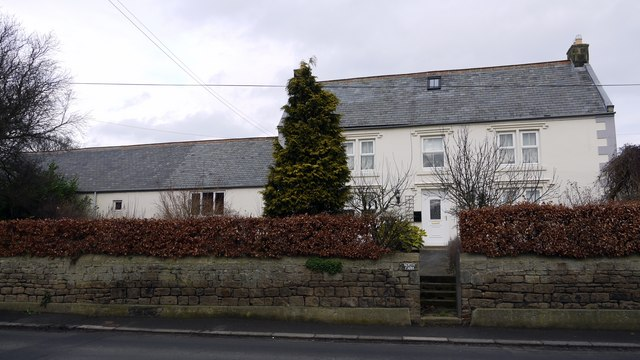
- North Farm

- Location within Northumberland
- Population: 405 (2011 Census data for Horsley Parish)
- OS grid reference: NZ095665
- Civil parish: Horsley
- Unitary authority: Northumberland
- Ceremonial county: Northumberland
- Region: North East
- Country: England
- Sovereign state: United Kingdom
- Post town: NEWCASTLE UPON TYNE
- Postcode district: NE15
- Dialling code: 01661
- Police: Northumbria
- Fire: Northumberland
- Ambulance: North East
- UK Parliament: Hexham

Horsley is a small village and civil parish in Northumberland, England. The village lies on the top of a south-facing hill above the River Tyne, around 11 miles (18 km) from Newcastle upon Tyne and 12 miles (19 km) from Hexham.

Nearby villages include Heddon-on-the-Wall, Ovingham, Ovington and Wylam.

== Demography ==
The data below show that 49.4% of the population in Horsley (Parish) are male and 50.6% are female, which is in line with that of the national average, as well as that of the county of Northumberland.

A total of 1.5% of the population were from a black, Asian and minority ethnic (BAME) group in Horsley (Parish). This figure is somewhat lower than that of the average in Northumberland (2.6%), as well as being significantly lower than the national average (14.6%).

Data from the Office for National Statistics found that the average life expectancy in the Bywell electoral ward is 81.4 years for men, and 83.0 years for women. These statistics compare very favourably, when compared to the average life expectancy in the North East of England, of 77.4 and 81.4 years, for men and women respectively.

Car ownership is very high in Horsley (Parish), with a total of 92.9% households having access to at least one car. This is significantly higher than the average within Northumberland (78.0%), as well as the national average (74.2%).

Demography (data from 2011 Census)
Demographic	% of population Horsley (Parish)	% of population Northumberland	% of population England
Total	405	316,028	53,012,456
Male	49.4%	48.8%	49.2%
Female	50.6%	51.2%	50.8%
BAME	1.5%	2.6%	14.6%
Age 65+	14.3%	20.2%	16.4%

== Governance ==
The village is located within the parliamentary constituency of Hexham. Joe Morris of the Labour Party is the Member of Parliament.

After boundary changes in 2025, Horsley is in the electoral ward of Stocksfield and Bywell for Northumberland County Council elections.

== Landmarks ==
The site of Vindobala Roman Fort, of which little is now visible, lies around 2 miles (3.2 km) to the north-east of the village. Nearby is Rudchester Hall, a medieval pele tower, much altered and extended in Gothic style in the eighteenth and nineteenth centuries.

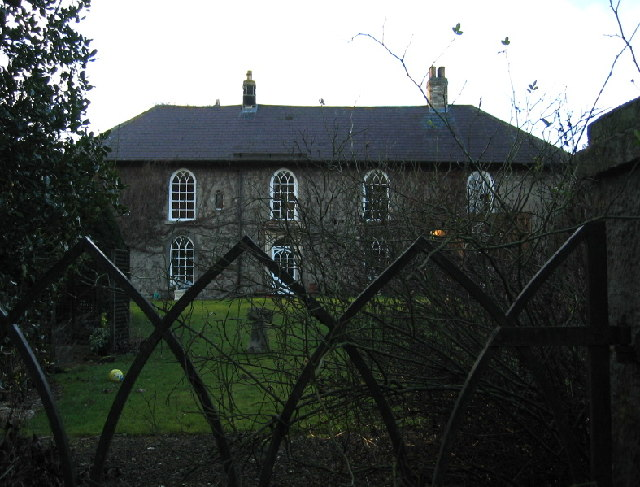
Rudchester Hall

Around 3 miles (4.8 km) to the north-west of the village are the remains of a medieval manor house and tower house at Welton Hall, now located within a farm complex. The tower house dates from the late fourteenth or early fifteenth-century and is roofless. The manor house is even older, but has been much altered and rebuilt.

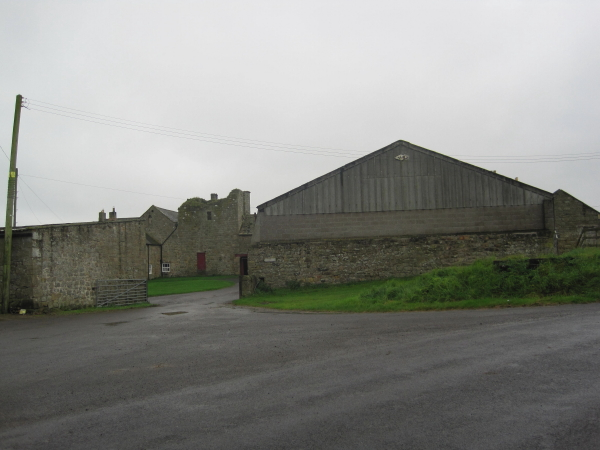
Welton Hall

== The Hearth Arts Centre ==
The Hearth Centre (Horsley) Ltd was established in the village in 2004 as a charity.

== Transport ==
=== Air ===
The nearest airport is Newcastle International Airport, which is around 8.5 miles (14 km) from the village by road. Carlisle Lake District Airport and Teesside International Airport are located around 43 and 47 miles (69 and 76 km) from the village respectively.

=== Bus ===
The village is served by two buses per hour to Hexham and Newcastle, with one bus per hour to Carlisle.

=== Rail ===
The nearest National Rail stations are located around 2.5 miles (4 km) from the village at Wylam and Prudhoe, both of which serve the Tyne Valley Line, with services operated by Northern Trains. From Wylam, there is an hourly service to both Hexham and Newcastle. There is a more regular service at Prudhoe, with three trains per hour to Hexham and Newcastle, as well as a twice-hourly service to Carlisle.

=== Road ===
The village is located near to the A69 road, which runs for 54 miles (87 km), from Carlisle to the A1 at Denton Burn. The former route of the A69, now the B6528, used to run through the village to Heddon-on-the-Wall, but is now bypassed.

== See also ==
- Heddon-on-the-Wall
- Ovingham
- Ovington
- Wylam
