= Thinford =

Coordinates: 54.705°N 1.567°W

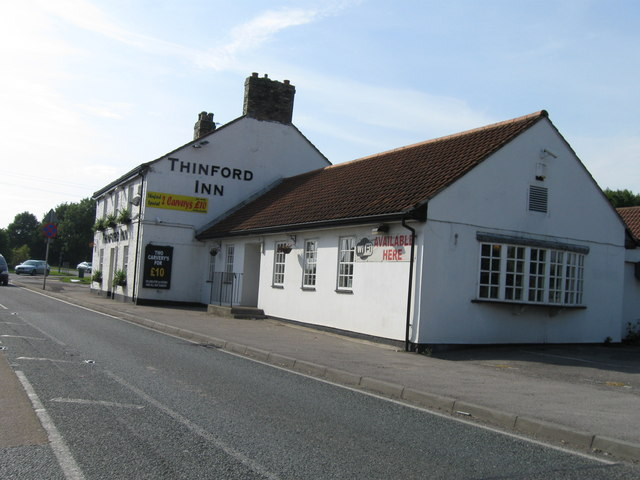
- Thinford Inn

- Location within County Durham
- OS grid reference: NZ280345
- Civil parish: Spennymoor
- Unitary authority: County Durham
- Ceremonial county: Durham
- Region: North East
- Country: England
- Sovereign state: United Kingdom
- Post town: Durham
- Postcode district: DH6
- Police: Durham
- Fire: County Durham and Darlington
- Ambulance: North East

Thinford is a small hamlet in the civil parish of Spennymoor, in County Durham, England. It is situated to the east of Spennymoor, between Darlington and Durham at the intersection of the A167 and the A688.

It consists of only a few houses, but contains a pub and restaurant serving a wider area, as well as a McDonald's restaurant, a KFC restaurant, a Starbucks Coffee Drive Thru, a Burger King Drive Thru, and BP filling station serving traffic on the A167, which also features a Spar convenience store, along with a Greg's bakery and Subway.

Thinford is in the process of a multimillion-pound redevelopment known as Durham Gate. This is due to bring hundreds of new homes, shops and office facilities. Work has already started on the development and people are already living in new homes built by Taylor Wimpey and Maple Oak Homes.

About one mile to the east of Thinford, there is an electrical substation, which is linked by a line of L6 pylons to the Stella West substation in Tyneside, and by a line of L12 400 kV pylons (which replaced the older L66 275 kV pylons in 2011) to the Norton substation in Teesside.
