= Great Flood of 1771 =

Severe flooding of many rivers in northern England in 1771

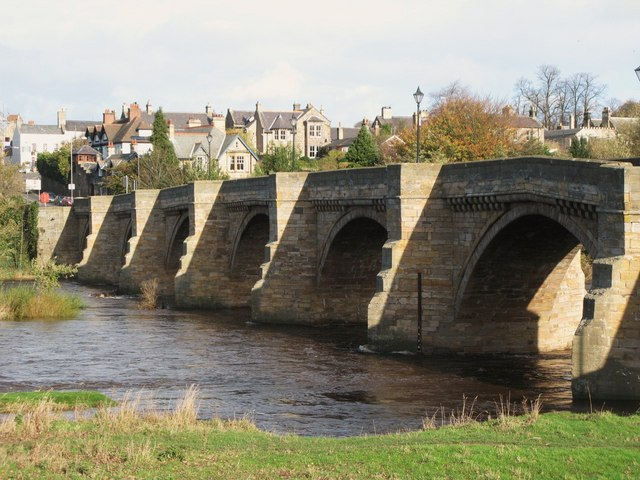
Corbridge Bridge (built 1674), the only bridge on the River Tyne to survive the Great Flood of 1771

The Great Flood of 1771 affected several rivers, including the Tyne, Tees, Wear and Eden and settlements across Northern England from 16 and 17 November 1771. Its cause was a sudden thaw of the ice in upper Teesdale, a cloud burst over the Pennines and a continuous period of rain.

At Newcastle upon Tyne the middle arch and two of the arches near the Gateshead side of the Tyne Bridge collapsed in the early hours of November 17. Like many bridges of the time there had been houses and shops on the bridge. Upstream, most of the village of Styford on the north bank was destroyed. In total, 25 people died and thirteen or fourteen bridges, including Hexham Bridge, were destroyed on the North, South and main Tyne rivers.

On the River Wear in the city of Durham three arches of Elvet Bridge were destroyed, and Prebends Bridge of 1574 was swept away. Further downstream the city's Corn Mill was badly damaged and needed to be rebuilt.

On the River Tees mills and houses were lost, and the river was reportedly 0.5 miles (800 m) wide at Low Coniscliffe. Yarm was one of the areas worst affected, as the river burst its banks in several places. Some stretches of the High Street were submerged in 20 feet (6 m) of water. According to reports, the whole of Yarm lay underwater, every building was affected, six houses were destroyed and many more left uninhabitable. The Shambles was washed away and the town's main church was also damaged. Nine of the townspeople also died.

To the west, the River Eden also rose and affected Carlisle and Botcherby Mill, flooding the church, as did Solway Moss, flooding local farms and settlements.
