= A roads in Zone 6 of the Great Britain numbering scheme =

The numbering zones for A-roads in Great Britain

List of A roads in zone 6 in Great Britain starting east of the A6 and A7 roads, and west of the A1 (road beginning with 6).

== Single- and double-digit roads ==
Road	From	To	Notes
A6	Luton	Carlisle	Originally London to Carlisle, starting from the A1 at Barnet. The fourth longest numbered route in the UK at 299 miles.
A60	Loughborough	Doncaster	
A61	Derby	Thirsk	Runs through Leeds as the eastern flank of Leeds Inner Ring Road. Forms the primary route between Leeds and Harrogate but is superseded to the south by the M1 motorway to Wakefield. Originally went on what is now the A6135 north of Sheffield.
A62	Leeds	Manchester	Former main Trans Pennine route from Lancashire to Yorkshire, most of the traffic now uses the M62 motorway, which follows roughly the same route between Manchester and Leeds, but extends to Hull and Liverpool
A63	Leeds	Kingston upon Hull	
A64	Leeds	Scarborough	Main road from West Yorkshire to the East Coast. Is briefly A64(M) as part of Leeds Inner Ring Road.
A65	Leeds	Kendal	Trans Pennine route.
A66	Grangetown	Workington	
A67	Bowes	Crathorne	
A68	Edinburgh	Darlington	
A69	Denton Burn	Carlisle	

== Triple-digit roads ==
Road	From	To	Notes
A600	Hitchin	Bedford	Runs through Shortstown and Cotton End. Originally started in Welwyn, but the section south of Hitchin is now B656, Codicote Road, High Street, and London Road.
A601			Derby Inner Ring Road. See also the A601(M) motorway in Lancashire. Previously allocated to a road from Luton to near Babraham. Became a portion of the A505 in 1935 when it was extended north to the A11; the section through Hitchin and Baldock is now the B656.
A602	Hitchin	Ware	
A603	Bedford	Cambridge	Section from Sandy to New Wimpole (on the A1198) downgraded to B1042.
A604	Unused		Used to run from Barton Seagrave to Harwich. Downgraded to sections of the A14, A1307, A143, A1017, A1124, A137, B1352, A120 and A136 by 1998. The original route went from the A6 at Barton Seagrave to the A14 at Huntingdon. Historically, the Godmanchester to Colchester section was the original A132, and the Colchester to Harwich section was the original A135.
A605	A14 J13	Hobbs Lot Bridge, near Guyhirn	
A606	Stamford	West Bridgford	
A607	Leicester	Bracebridge Heath	
A608	Newstead	Derby	
A609	Nottingham	Belper	
A610	Nottingham	Ambergate	
A611	Nottingham	Mansfield	
A612	Nottingham	Newark-on-Trent	Runs via Southwell
A613	Unused		Originally ran from Nuthall to Alfreton. The extension of the M1 to J28 and the completion of the A615 Alfreton bypass (now the A38) resulted in a faster route between Nottingham and Alfreton, and this was the final nail in the coffin for the A613. It was downgraded to the B600, probably in the late 1960s or early 1970s (does not show on maps after that). Later used for the Gateshead Western Bypass from Birtley to Blaydon. Became part of the A69 early on and then the A1 in the 1990s. Number also appears in the DfT Road lists from around 2002 as "Reserved for use for the Kirkumgate - Disforth proposals". Both place names do not exist with these spellings ("Kirkumgate" is probably an archaic spelling for Kirkhamgate and "Disforth" is a typo). The route is likely a descendant of the Kirkhamgate - Dishforth Motorway, a proposal to extend the M1 north between Leeds and Bradford, which later became the A6183, before being rerouted east of Leeds and becoming the M1 extension north of J43.
A614	Calverton	Bridlington	
A615	Alfreton	Matlock	Former section between Alfreton and Mansfield now part of A38
A616	Newark-on-Trent	Huddersfield	Becomes M1 motorway between Junctions 30 & 35A
A617	Chesterfield	Newark-on-Trent	
A618	Clowne	Rotherham	
A619	Bakewell	Worksop	
A620	Ranby	Beckingham	
A621	Sheffield	Baslow	
A622	Unused		Originally ran from Bakewell to Hathersage; downgraded to the B6001 in the 1960s, although a section in Calver is the southern end of the A625. Later used as a provisional number along the Haslingden Bypass in east Lancashire. It was extended to meet the M65 at J8 in 1985 and was then renumbered as part of a rerouted A56.
A623	Chapel-en-le-Frith	Baslow	
A624	Glossop	Chapel-en-le-Frith	Prior to rerouting of the A6 via Chapel-en-le-Frith this used to go as far as Buxton
A625	Sheffield	Calver	Rerouted following collapse of part of the route
A626	Glossop	Heaton Chapel	
A627	Hazel Grove	Rochdale	Between Oldham and Rochdale runs as the A627(M).
A628	Hollingworth	Pontefract	Trans Pennine route.
A629	Rotherham	Skipton	Runs between Chapeltown and the junction with A61 west of Burncross as B6546. Originally went south via current A61 routing to Sheffield.
A630	Sheffield	M18 Junction 4	
A631	Greenland	Louth	
A632	Matlock	Cuckney	Previously allocated to a road from Rotherham to north of Sheffield; this became part of the rerouted A629 at the same time the current A632 was created. The section between old and current A61 is now the B6546.
A633	Rotherham	New Lodge	
A634	Maltby	A638 near Retford	
A635	Manchester	Doncaster	Trans Pennine route. The westernmost section in Manchester is part of the unsigned A635(M).
A636	Denby Dale	Wakefield	
A637	Gawber	Grange Moor	
A638	A1 at Markham Moor	M62 Chain Bar junction	Formerly the A1 but renumbered after the construction of the A1 Retford bypass (Markham Moor to Blyth) and the A1(M) Doncaster bypass (Blyth to Carcroft)
A639	Skellow	Leeds	
A640	Rochdale	Huddersfield	Trans Pennine route.
A641	Huddersfield	Bradford	Main road between Huddersfield and Bradford.
A642	Huddersfield	Garforth	
A643	M62 Junction 23	Leeds	
A644	Dewsbury	Denholme Clough	
A645	Crofton	Snaith	Joins the A638 at Crofton and this continues to Wakefield.
A646	Halifax	Burnley	
A647	Leeds	Halifax	Britain's first High Occupancy Vehicle Lane (HOV lane).
A648	Unused		Ran from Denholme to Brighouse. Renumbered as an extension of the A644 in 1935. Next used from Kegworth to West Bridgford, linking the M1 at J24 to Nottingham; a portion of the route was formally the B679. In 1978, the section west of the A614 was renumbered as a portion of a rerouted A453; the section to the east returned to the B679.
A649	Liversedge	Hipperholme	
A650	Wakefield	Keighley	
A651	Liversedge	East Bierley	
A652	Dewsbury	Gomersal	
A653	Dewsbury	Leeds	
A654	Tingley	Oulton	
A655	near Crofton	Castleford	
A656	Castleford	Aberford	
A657	Shipley	Leeds	
A658	Bradford	A59 east of Knaresborough	
A659	Tadcaster	Otley	
A660	Leeds	Burley in Wharfedale	
A661	Wetherby	Harrogate	
A662	Manchester	Droylsden	
A663	Failsworth	Newhey	
A664	Manchester	Rochdale	
A665	Manchester	Ainsworth Junction with A58	
A666	Pendlebury	Langho	
A667	Kearsley	Whitefield	
A668	Unused		Ran from Whitefield to Ainsworth. The section from Whitefield to Radcliffe became an extension of the A665 in the 1960s and the remainder was downgraded to Class II in the early 1970s: the section in Whitefield became the B6473 and the section from Radcliffe to Ainsworth became the B6292.
A669	Middleton	Greenfield	
A670	Ashton-under-Lyne	Diggle	
A671	Oldham	Worston	
A672	Oldham	Ripponden	
A673	Bolton	Heath Charnock	
A674	Chorley	Blackburn	
A675	Bolton	Walton-le-Dale	
A676	Ramsbottom	Bolton	
A677	Blackburn	Samlesbury	
A678	Blackburn	Padiham	
A679	Blackburn	Burnley	
A680	Rochdale	Whalley	
A681	Haslingden	Todmorden	
A682	Bent Gate	Long Preston	Part of the road is the most dangerous in the UK
A683	Heysham	Kirkby Stephen	includes the Bay Gateway opened 2016
A684	Kendal	A19 east of Ellerbeck	
A685	Kendal	Brough	
A686	Penrith	Haydon Bridge	
A687	Ingleton	Cantsfield	Originally allocated between Scotch Corner and Darlington (the A1 was routed from Boroughbridge to Darlington via Thirsk and Northallerton). But as early as February 1922, it was decided that the A1 should run via Scotch Corner, as its route was more important. Eventually the MOT caved in to local authority knowledge, and the A687 was one of the first A roads to be decommissioned, becoming the A1. Much of route has since been downgraded due to completion of nearby A1(M) and A66(M), and the portion running through Barton was declassified. The section in County Durham is now part of the A66.
A688	Barnard Castle	Bowburn	
A689	A595 near Carlisle	Hartlepool	
A690	Crook	Sunderland	
A691	Consett	Durham	
A692	Castleside	A1 near Gateshead	
A693	Leadgate	Chester-le-Street	
A694	Consett	A1 near MetroCentre	
A695	Newcastle-upon-Tyne	Hexham	Part was proposed to be the A695(M) Shields Road Motorway
A696	Otterburn	Newcastle-upon-Tyne	
A697	Morpeth	Oxton	
A698	Berwick	Hawick	
A699	Selkirk	Kelso	

== Four-digit roads (60xx) ==
Road	From	To	Notes
A6000	Unused		Ran from the A600 to the A601 (now A505) in Hitchin; decommissioned sometime after 1960. The portion along Bedford Road is now part of the A505.
A6001	Biggleswade	Biggleswade	Originally ran from Henlow Camp to Biggleswade. The route from Biggleswade to Henlow Camp was downgraded to the B659.
A6002	Stapleford	Bulwell	Originally ran from Bedford to the A1 near Chawston. Became an extension of the A428 in 1935; the eastern section is now unclassified due to rerouting of the A421 and the western section is now part of the A4280.
A6003	Barton Seagrave	Oakham	Joins A14 opposite A6
A6004	Loughborough	Loughborough railway station	Loughborough Ring Road
A6005	Nottingham	Derby	Runs past the University of Nottingham and through Beeston and Long Eaton
A6006	Hathern	Melton Mowbray	Originally ran near Castle Donington between the A6 (now A50) and the A453 (now the B6540); declassified in 1970 or 1971.
A6007	Codnor	Bramcote	
A6008	former Broad Marsh Centre	Victoria Centre	Nottingham Inner Ring Road
A6009	Mansfield	Mansfield	Mansfield Inner Circle Originally ran from Budby to Worksop. Renumbered to B6005 in the 1970s and much of the route became part of the B6034 in the 1980s except for one section that was declassified.
A6010	Chorlton-cum-Hardy	Cheetham	Manchester Intermediate Ring Road Originally ran from Stony Middleton to Grindleford Bridge. Downgraded in the 1960s to a portion of the B6521 (the A622 was downgraded at the same time to the B6001).
A6011	Nottingham (Meadow Lane)	Gamston	Originally ran from Grindleford Bridge to the Fox House Inn. Downgraded in the 1960s to a portion of the B6521 (the A622 was downgraded at the same time to the B6001).
A6012	Unused		Was once a road in Bamford, cutting the corner between the A625 (now A6187) from Hope and the A6013. Declassified in the 1970s after the western end was blocked off.
A6013	Ashopton	Bamford	The original northern end (along with Ashopton itself) was flooded in 1945 when the Ladybower Reservoir was built and was rerouted over the A6014.
A6013	Kettering bypass	Northampton Road, Kettering	Former portion of the A43 before it was rerouted to bypass Kettering. Duplicate number.
A6014	Corby	Great Oakley	Originally on a route cutting the southeast corner between the A6013 and the A57 east of Ashopton. Became a portion of a rerouted A6013 in 1945 due to completion of the Ladybower Reservoir; the northern end is now gone, submerged beneath the reservoir. Parts of the old road can still be seen, including the spilt from the A6013 leading down towards the reservoir.
A6015	Newtown, New Mills	Hayfield	
A6016	Simmondley, Glossop	Charlestown, Glossop	Linking the A57 with the A624. Glossop Town Road.
A6017	Bredbury	Ashton-under-Lyne	
A6018	Mottram in Longdendale	Stalybridge	
A6019	Nottingham	Nottingham	A short stretch of road in Nottingham city centre. An older routing went from A57 High Street to A616 Bank Street in Sheffield, but was later extended north to A61 when it was rerouted along West Bar. Became part of the A621 by the 1960s and is now unclassified.
A6020	Ashford-in-the-Water	A619 near Bakewell	Acts as a bypass for Bakewell. Originally ran along Commercial Street in Sheffield, linking the A57 to the A61. Although the road was still classified in the 1990s, it did not have the A6020 number (it was moved to its current route in the 1930s) and had likely become a spur of the A57. Now unclassified.
A6021	South East Rotherham	South West Rotherham	Originally used on a route from the A628 Hemsworth Bypass to the A1/A639 junction at Barnsdale Bar, constructed in 2008-2009. The number stems from a typo, as the road was to be the A6201, but the route was mapped and signed as A6021. The signs have since been corrected.
A6022	Mexborough	Swinton	
A6023	Wath upon Dearne	Conisbrough	
A6024	A628 at Woodhead	Honley	
A6025	Brighouse	A629 near Elland	
A6026	A58 near Sowerby Bridge	A629 near Greetland	
A6027	Horwich	Horwich	Originally ran from King Cross to the A629 south of Halifax. Became a portion of the A646 (probably in the 1930s) along with the decommissioning of the A6028.
A6028	Unused		Ran from the A640 near Outlane to the A643 in Brighouse; became a portion of the A643 in 1935 when its western end was rerouted.
A6029	Morley	Tingley	
A6030	A563/A47 at Evington	A6 at Stoneygate	Relic of former Leicester ring road, now mostly substituted by A563 Outer Ring. Originally ran from the A642 to the A61 in Wakefield. The section along Marygate is now part of the A650 and the section along Bull Ring is unclassified, although some maps claim that it is also part of the A650.
A6031	Unused		Linked the A650 to the A61 in northern Wakefield, was one of the shortest A roads in the 1922 list at around 300 feet; became a portion of the A650 when it was rerouted.
A6032	Castleford	Castleford	
A6033	Littleborough	Haworth	
A6034	Steeton	Addingham	
A6035	Keighley	Keighley	
A6036	Halifax	Bradford	
A6037	Shipley	Bradford	
A6038	Shipley	Otley	
A6039	Unused		Ran from the A65 in Menston to the A659 (now A660) in Otley. Decommissioned when the A660 Otley bypass was built; the section west of the bypass became an extension of the A6038 and the eastern section became a portion of the A659. Number possibly used in Mansfield (appears on a DfT map from c. 2002), but no further information is known. Before Mansfield town center was bypassed, a tangle of A roads was shown on OS maps, and one of these probably had the A6039 number.
A6040	Harrogate	Harrogate	
A6041	Manchester	Salford	
A6042	Manchester	Manchester	Forms the western section of the Manchester & Salford Inner Relief Route
A6043	Ashton-under-Lyne	Ashton-under-Lyne	Signed westbound as (A627) and eastbound as A6018.
A6044	Pendlebury	Heaton Park	Takes on the names of Sheepfoot Lane, Scholes Lane, Hilton Lane, Rainsough Brow and finally Agecroft Road, respectively.
A6045	Heywood	Heaton Park	
A6046	Heywood	Middleton	
A6047	Heywood	Heywood	
A6048	Oldham	Oldham	
A6049	Unused		Ran from the A62 to the A627 along George Street in Oldham. The northern end is now gone, with the Town Square shopping center built on top.
A6050	A670 near Mossley	A669 near Lydgate	
A6051	Greenfield	Greenfield	Shortest A road in Britain, less than half a mile long
A6052	Uppermill	Denshaw	
A6053	Kearsley	A56 near Bury	
A6054	Unused		Ran along Marsden Road in Bolton from the A58 and B6203 to the A673. Became a spur of the A673, but likely not as part of the 1935 renumbering as a 1937 photograph still shows the road as A6054.
A6055	Knaresborough	Barton, North Yorkshire	Originally ran from Knaresborough to Boroughbridge; extended to replace the former A1 between Baldersby Gate and Barton after the A1(M) extension opened. Originally used for the northern end of Derby Street in Bolton, linking the A579 to the A568 (now A676). Route is now gone due to redevelopment.
A6056	Unused		Ran along Crook Street and Orlando Road in Bolton from the A6055 to the A66.
A6057	Unused		Ran from the A6056 to the A6058 in Bolton. Now part of the A579.
A6058	Bolton	Bolton	
A6059	Unused		Connected the A666 and A676 in northern Bolton. Downgraded to B6472 in the 1960s.
A6060	Rochdale	Rochdale	Along Dane Street - From A680 between Spotland Road and Edenfield Road to A58 Junction to The Esplanade and Dane Street
A6061	A675 in Riley Green, Lancashire	A674 near Feniscowles, Lancashire	
A6062	A674 in Feniscowles, Blackburn	A666 in Ewood, Blackburn	The A6062 passes through Livesey and is called Livesey Branch Road for its entire length. The road was originally a turnpike road built in 1810 as a branch of the Blackburn & Bolton Trust.
A6063	Preston	Deepdale, Preston	Originally ran from the A677 along Branch Road to Whalley Road (then the A59) in Mellor Brook. This became part of a rerouted A59 after World War II and the A6063 was reassigned to a portion of bypassed A59 through Myerscough Smithy. Later the route was extended to go around Samlesbury Aerodrome. In the 1960s the A59 and A677 were given their routes back, but the A6063 was declassified instead of being given its original route.
A6064	Unused		Ran from Rishton to Harwood Bar. Downgraded to the B6535 in the 1970s.
A6065	Unused		First used along Blackburn Road in Accrington from Abbey Street (then A680) to Broadway (then A679). Declassified to remove traffic from the center of Accrington. Ran as a loop off of the A1 along the former A1 via through Newark-on-Trent Renumbered to the A616, B6325 and B6326 because there was no need for a Class I road through Newark after the bypass opened in 1990.
A6066	A681 in Stacksteads, Lancashire	A671 in Britannia, Lancashire	Near Bacup
A6067	Unused		Ran from the A58 in Littleborough to the A681 near Todmorden along the Rochdale Canal. Became an extension of the A6033 in 1935. Number later used from Annfield Plain to Flint Hill along a former section of A6076. This was downgraded to the B6168 in the 1960s.
A6068	Kildwick, North Yorkshire	Hapton, Lancashire	Via Padiham, Colne
A6069	Skipton	Skipton	
A6070	Carnforth	Crooklands	Includes the route of the former A601(M) motorway following its downgrading.
A6071	Brampton	Gretna	
A6072	Heighington	Bishop Auckland	
A6073	Unused		Ran from Bishop Auckland to the A68 at High Etherley. Except for the easternmost section (now unclassified), the route is now part of the B6282.
A6074	Unused		Ran from Bishop Auckland to the A1 (now A167) at Croxdale. Much of route now A688 (much of it bypassed, however), the section north of Spennymoor is now B6288 and the bypassed sections are now unclassified.
A6075	Sutton in Ashfield	Darlton	Originally ran from Castleside to Leadgate via Consett. Became a western extension of the A692 in 1935.
A6076	Lanchester	Sunniside	
A6077	Blackburn	M65 at Guide	Previously numbered A6177 until 2005, to remove duplication as another A6177 (the current one) exists. Was originally B6232. Originally ran from A693 in Stanley to A692 in Hobson. Downgraded to Class II status as the B6173.
A6078	Blackburn	Blackburn	Blackburn Orbital Route Originally ran from A686 in Crook Hill to A69 in Haydon Bridge (now Shaftoe Street; bridge demolished). Declassified in the 1960s, probably when the current bridge was built.
A6079	Hexham	A68 road	
A6080	Unused		Cut the corner between the A66 and A69 (both now A695) in Corbridge. Now part of the A695.
A6081	Unused		Ran from Gateshead to Blaydon (Now Ellison Road, Market Lane, and B6317/Hexham Road; also went east along A1114 and Derwentwater Road before the A184 was built).
A6082	Unused		Ran in Gateshead from the A184 to the A695 (now A189; originally went south along First Street and Elysium Street to the A692 before the A184 was built).
A6083	Unused		Ran in Gateshead from the A6081 to the A6082 (became part of the A184 when it was built).
A6084	Unused		Ran along Mulgrave Terrace from A6125/West Street to A692/Bensham Road in Gateshead. This became part of the A184 as parts were closed off; reused on the old route of the A184 along Askew Road, East Gate, Hawks Road, and Saltmeadow Road.
A6085	Scotswood Bridge	Throckley	
A6086	Corby	Corby	Originally ran along Grainger Street West and Grainger Street in Newcastle-upon-Tyne; now unclassified.
A6087	Unused		Ran from the A6087 in Belsay to the A1 (now B1337) south of Morpeth. Downgraded to the B6524 in the 1970s.
A6088	Hawick	Carter Bar (A68)	
A6089	Whiteburn	Kelso	
A6090	Bonjedward	Bonjedward	Most likely to be the second shortest "A road" in Great Britain after the A962 in Kirkwall.
A6091	Galashiels	Newtown St Boswells	Used as the link to the A68, bypassing Melrose
A6092	Unused		Ran from the A7 to Melrose Road (former A6091). Downgraded to the B6452 when the A6091 was rerouted, although some maps claim the road is the western end of the B6374.
A6093	Fordel	Haddington	
A6094	Leadburn	Wallyford	
A6095	Edinburgh	Musselburgh	
A6096	Spondon	Giltbrook	Originally ran from Meadowbank to Joppa, connecting the A1 to itself. Became the A1 in 1935 when it was rerouted; the eastern section is now the A199 when the A1 was rerouted onto the Musselburgh bypass.
A6097	Bingham	Warren Hill, near Farnsfield, Nottinghamshire	
A6098	Kettering	Kettering	
A6099	Bolton	Halliwell	Originally ran along Vicar Lane in Chesterfield, possibly a replacement for the B6046 which paralleled the route to the south. This became a spur of the A619 in 1935.

== Four-digit roads (61xx and higher) ==
Road	From	To	Notes
A6100			Ran along London Road in Sheffield, connecting the A621 to itself; was the B6068 until the mid-1920s. The London Road section is now the B6388 and the Wolseley Road section is now part of a rerouted A621.
A6101	Rivelin, Sheffield	Hillsborough, Sheffield	
A6102	A61 at Greenhill	A616 at Deepcar	
A6103	Reserved		Reserved for Derby, possibly for the southern part of the A61. The original route went from A62 in Newton Heath via Lightbowne Road to A6104 in Moston; this became part of an extended B6393 by the 1970s.
A6104	Hathershaw	Prestwich	
A6105	Earlston	Berwick-upon-Tweed	
A6106	Dalkeith	Portobello	The section between the A720 and Dalkeith was previously part of the A68 before that road was diverted further east.
A6107	A643 near Brighouse	A62 at Bradley	
A6108	Scotch Corner	Ripon	
A6109	Sheffield	Rotherham	
A6110	Beeston, Leeds	Bramley, Leeds	Part of the Leeds Outer Ring Road.
A6111			Ran from Wooler to Scremerston; was the B6350 before it was upgraded to Class I status. Downgraded back to Class II status as the B6525.
A6112	Coldstream	Grantshouse	
A6113			Cut the corner between the A627 and A560 south of Hyde. Now part of a rerouted A627.
A6114	Burnley	Reedley	
A6115			Ran as a road in Newcastle-upon-Tyne from A191 to A1 (now A194) (former A69 and A184; the A1 went southeast via current A19 and A194 at the time). When the western bypass was built and the A1 was rerouted over it, it became part of the A186 and A184. The original A6115 was in Welwyn from the A600 (High Street; this section of the A600 has since been removed) in Welwyn town centre to the A1 at the Clock Hotel (now Church Street and Roman Street).
A6116	Thrapston	Rockingham	
A6117	Mansfield	Mansfield Woodhouse	Originally ran from Leicester Bridge to the A606 and B679. Now part of a rerouted A606.
A6118			Ran from Stibbington to Wansford along an old routing of the A1. Declassified in 2017.
A6119	Beardwood	Whitebirk	Part of the Blackburn Ring Road.
A6120	A647	M1 J46	Part of the Leeds Outer Ring Road.
A6121	Morcott	Bourne	
A6123	South East Rotherham	North Rotherham	
A6124	Musselburgh	Fordel	
A6125			Ran from Gateshead to Seaton Burn along the former A1. Became the B1307, B1318, and A1 in the early 1990s due to completion of the Newcastle Western Bypass and the subsequent rerouting of the A1 onto the bypass.
A6126			Ran from the A1 across the Swing Bridge to Newcastle upon Tyne; was originally the northern end of the A184 until the rerouting of the A1 put it out of zone. All of route unclassified except the section along Sandhill (now B1600), the northern end of the route around Grey's Monument is now pedestrianized.
A6127			Ran from Chester-le-Street to Blakelaw; became a portion of the A167 after the Newcastle western bypass opened in the 1990s. Current A167(M) originally had the designation of A6127(M).
A6128			Since the A6135 was created in 1930, this road definitely existed, but it is unknown where.
A6129	Welwyn	Welwyn	
A6130	Lenton	Mapperley Park	Originally ran along Huntingdon Street and the middle part of Lower Parliament Street in Nottingham; formerly the B681. Now part of the A60.
A6131	Low Snaygill	Skipton Bypass	
A6132			First used in Nottingham along Beeston Road in what is now the University of Nottingham campus; formerly a portion of the A453 from 1922-1924. The A6132 number only appears on a 1936 map; a 1939 map shows the route as part of the A614 and later maps show it as a spur of the A453 into the 1950s. Downgraded around 1959 (as it does not appear on that year's map), probably in connection with the construction of the then-B6464. Next used between the A600 and the A505 along Fishpond and Nightingale roads in Hitchin, bypassing Hitchin town center to the north. Now part of the A505.
A6133	Measborough Dike	Pogmoor	Originally ran between Sleaford Road in Newark-on-Trent to Beauford Cross; a portion of the route was formerly B689.
A6134			Was part of the Sheffield Inner Ring Road; became part of the A61 in the 1990s.
A6135	M1 J30, near Barlborough	M1 J36, near Hoyland	Via Sheffield City Centre. Originally allocated to a road from A629 north of Sheffield northeast to A61; this became part of a rerouted A61, and the road number was reused on the old route of the A61.
A6136	Richmond	A1	
A6137	Aberlady	Haddington	
A6138			Since the former A6141 was created in 1930, this road definitely existed, but it is unknown where.
A6139	Sowerby Bridge	Sowerby Bridge	
A6140	Ashton-under-Lyne	Guide Bridge	Most of its route is the Ashton-under-Lyne Northern By-Pass. Originally ran along former A58 in Bolton, linking the A58 to itself. Now the western end of the A676.
A6141			Ran from Letchworth to Baldock. Became the A505 and B197 in the 2000s after Baldock was bypassed.
A6142	Sowerby Bridge	Halifax	
A6143	Manchester	Deansgate	
A6144	Lymm	Stretford	Includes the Carrington Spur, formerly the A6144(M). Originally used in Bolton, possibly allocated in the 1960s alongside the A6145. Probably short-lived as the number was reused slightly further south in the 1970s.
A6145	Daubhill	Fernhill Gate	
A6146			Former route in Bolton. It is unknown where it went, but it probably ran alongside the A6145.
A6171			Ran from the A6127 (former A1) to the A6125 in Gateshead.
A6172			Great Moor Street from A575 to Black Horse Street in Bolton (formerly part of the A579). The original A6172 went along Roff Avenue, Park Avenue, and Polehill Avenue in Bedford (it is unknown whether this was signed or even numbered).
A6175	Clay Cross	M1	
A6176	Ravenscliffe	Bolton, Bradford	
A6177	Bradford	Bradford	Also used in 1997 between Blackburn and the A56 at Haslingden Grane when the M65 was completed. Originally the B6232, it returned to that number in 2005 when it was found that the number was a duplicate; the section west of the M65 became the A6077.
A6178	Rotherham	Sheffield	
A6180			Ran between Romiley and Bredbury; originally was the western end of the B6104. It is unknown if the number was ever used as the road still had Class II status in the 1960s but had been upgraded to the A6017 by the 1980s.
A6181	Bradford	Bradford	
A6182	M18 J3	Doncaster	
A6183	Kettering	Weekley	Kettering northern bypass, formerly a section of the A43. Originally proposed as an alternative number for the M1 west of Leeds proposal between Kirkhamgate and Dishforth. Dropped in favor of a route from the M1 to the A1 that ran east of Leeds, eventually becoming the M1 extension.
A6184	Heywood Distribution Park	M62 J19	Queen Elizabeth Way, opened in November 2022.
A6185	Rishton	Accrington	
A6186	Durkar	Milnthorpe	
A6187	A625	Castleton	Part of the former route of the A625 Ends to a single track road leading to Chapel-en-le-frith
A6188	Heaton Chapel	Shaw Heath	Designated 2019; former portions of the A626 and B5465.
A6191	Mansfield	Rainworth	A section of old A617, renamed after designation of a new by-pass section using A617, both roads having junctions with the old A617 on Mansfield outskirts and with the old A617 on the outskirts of Rainworth village
A6192	Long Duckmanton	Staveley	Links Markham Vale Business Park and M1 J29A to the A619 to the north and the A632 to the south.
A6193	Milnrow	Rochdale	It is Sir Isaac Newton Way running from A640 roundabout between Elizabethan Way and Newhey Road to A644 (Kingsway)
A6194			Wakefield Eastern Relief Road, also known as Neil Fox Way
A6195	M1 J36	Shafton	
A6196	Cutsyke	Glasshoughton	Glasshoughton Southern Link Road, opened in June 2020.
A6200	Nottingham	Nottingham	
A6201	A628 southeast of Hemsworth	A1 - A639 intersection at Barnsdale Bar (South of Pontefract)	Renumbered from A6021 when it was found the original A6021 in Rotherham still existed.
A6211	Woodthorpe, Arnold	Gedling, Carlton	
A6400			Listed in the DfT Roads List as "Wakefield, West Yorkshire Between A64 and A642 link road", but as it does not appear on any known maps, the number may have been short-lived or was simply never used. A 2002 Wakefield MDC planning document stated that the route did in fact become Bar Lane, though it was seemingly never classified (and the number not mentioned).
A6464	Lenton Abbey	Beeston	
A6514	Arnold	Wollaton	Part of the Nottingham Ring Road, linking the A52 west of the city to the A60 north of the city.
A6520	Trent Bridge	Nottingham	Possibly also used in Derby (the DfT list simply states 'Derby'), but no further information is known. The choice of number suggests a link between the A6 and the A52. So far, mapping evidence suggests that if this number was used in Derby, it was probably a very short link in the city center.
A6539	M62 J32	Castleford Asda	
A6900	A4300 Montagu Street, Kettering	A6098 Windmill Avenue, Kettering	
