= Ponteland Castle =

Castle in the United Kingdom

Coordinates: 55.0503°N 1.7417°W

Ponteland Castle, also known as Erringtons Tower or Castle of Aymer de Athol, is a 14th-century stone tower house just off the A696 road in Ponteland, 8 miles north-west of Newcastle upon Tyne, in Northumberland.

It was built in the 14th century. Part of it was destroyed in a Scottish raid in 1388. It became part of a Jacobean manor house and was rebuilt by Mark Erington in the 17th century. It was ruined in 1935 when it was restored into a public house. The building is now occupied by the Blackbird Inn. It has been a Grade II listed building since 1952.
