= A1058 road =

Road in North Tyneside, England

A1058

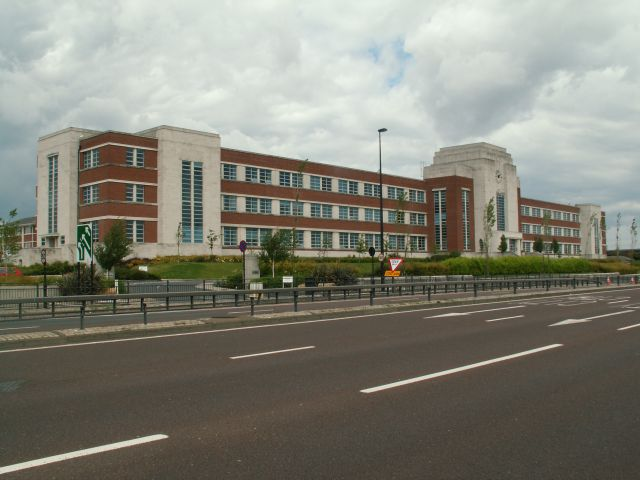
- W. D. and H. O. Wills Building on A1058

Route information
- Length: 7.4 mi (11.9 km)

Major junctions
- West end: Jesmond; 54.9828°N 1.6044°W
- A167(M) A188 A186; A19 A1108 A192 A193
- East end: Tynemouth; 55.0251°N 1.4354°W

Location
- Country: United Kingdom

Road network
- Roads in the United Kingdom; Motorways; A and B road zones

The A1058, signposted as Beach Road (Note: from The Tynemouth Castle Inn to Billy Mill Junction formerly Billy Mill Roundabout), Coast Road (Note: from Billy Mill Junction formerly Billy Mill Roundabout to Cradlewell) and Jesmond Road (Note: from Cradlewell to the Junction with the A167(M)) is a major road in Newcastle upon Tyne and the adjoining borough of North Tyneside in North East England. It runs from the Newcastle Central Motorway to the coast, terminating between Whitley Bay and Tynemouth. From west to east it connects Newcastle city centre with Jesmond, Heaton, Wallsend, Battle Hill, Howdon, Meadow Well, North Shields, Whitley Bay and Tynemouth. The road has existed since December 1924, when it was opened by then-transport minister Wilfrid Ashley.

For five miles (8 kilometres) of its eight-mile (12.5 kilometre) route it is a full urban dual carriageway with grade separated interchanges and, for four of those miles, was a 70-mile-per-hour (110 km/h) national speed limit road. As of October 2023, the speed limit has been reduced to 50 miles per hour (80 km/h). However, it is not built to full UK standards for motorway-style roads, as it has too many entrances and exits and most of its sliproads have pedestrian crossings.

== Route ==
The road starts at the Jesmond Road Interchange, with the B1600 and A167(M). The A1058 originally started on the A1 Barras Bridge and headed east along Jesmond Road. With the construction of the A167(M) Central Motorway, the road was cut back. The road heads eastwards. This first section was originally A188 but soon afterwards the new-build begins, marked by the upgrade to dual carriageway. The road remains dual-carriageway and grade-separated for some miles now.

After being a grade-separated dual-carriageway for 4.8 miles (7.7 km) the A1058 comes to a complete stop at a set of traffic lights with the A1108 and B1316. It then continues as Beach Road for 0.8 miles (1.3 km) until it comes to a halt at the roundabout junction with the A192. Originally, it continued east of here along Queen Alexandra Road and so on, finally along King Edward Road to end on the A193 near the station, one block from the sea front. This section is now unclassified and a bypass has been built taking the A1058 to the north of Tynemouth Golf Course, where it still ends a block away from the North Sea coast on the A193.

== Interchanges ==
The A1058 interchanges with two other major roads, the A19 and the A167. The interchange with the A167 on the Newcastle Central Motorway was constructed along with the motorway itself finishing in 1973, and has remained largely unchanged in the fifty years since.

=== A19 - Silverlink Interchange ===
The Coast Road has crossed the A19 at what is now called Silverlink Interchange since 1967, when the first Tyne Tunnel finished construction. However, Silverlink Retail Park itself has only existed since c. 1990; it is accessible directly from the interchange's roundabout, along with Cobalt Business Park, a significant economic organ of the area. Prior to 2016 there was no direct through route on the A19; traffic on that road had to use the roundabout with traffic to and from the A1058 and the retail park, which caused the interchange to be congested and dangerous. Beginning in 2016 and completing construction in April 2019, National Highways constructed the first three-level stack interchange in the North East, meaning both roads now have a free flowing through route.

== History ==
The original Coast Road, the 4.7-mile (7.6 km) road from Chillingham Road, Newcastle upon Tyne to Billy Mill, Queen Alexander Road West, Tynemouth, was opened by Col. Wilfrid Ashley, Minister of Transport, on 27 October 1927. The width was 100 feet (30 m) with a 30-foot (9.1 m) reinforced concrete carriageway on the north side and 7-foot (2.1 m) footpaths separated from the carriageway by 5.5-foot (1.7 m) verges. There was space allowed for future dualling.

Four local authorities were involved in the construction of the road as well as the Ministry of Transport, which contributed 50% of the £180,000 cost. The local authorities contributed the remaining £90,000 balance in the following proportions:- Newcastle Corporation 44.7%, Tynemouth Corporation 34.1%, Wallsend Corporation and Longbenton Urban District Council 1.2%.

Whitley and Monkseaton Urban District Council and Earsdon Urban District Council were party to the initial negotiations as it was then proposed to make a new branch road from Billy Mill, via Rake House Lane through the Earsdon district direct to Whitley Bay. However Whitley Bay withdrew which thus involved the withdrawal of Earsdon Council and the branch road was deleted from the scheme.

The road saved 2.5 miles (4.0 km) from the old route through Longbenton.

In his opening speech Lord Ashley, with it being a fine day, said that it seemed a land of perpetual sunshine and might be termed the Northern Riviera. He congratulated them on the completion of the great enterprise and enabling the citizens of Newcastle to have easier access to the charming seaside resort of Tynemouth at the end of the road. It would also help commercial enterprise.

=== Later upgrades ===
The 0.6-mile (0.97 km) Cradlewell Bypass at Jesmond, from Sandyford Road to Benton Bank, was due to open in January 1996. It included a 110-metre (360 ft) underpass and a 4-span viaduct over Ouse Burn adjacent to the existing Benton Bank Bridge. The cost was £15 million.
