= Styford Bridge =

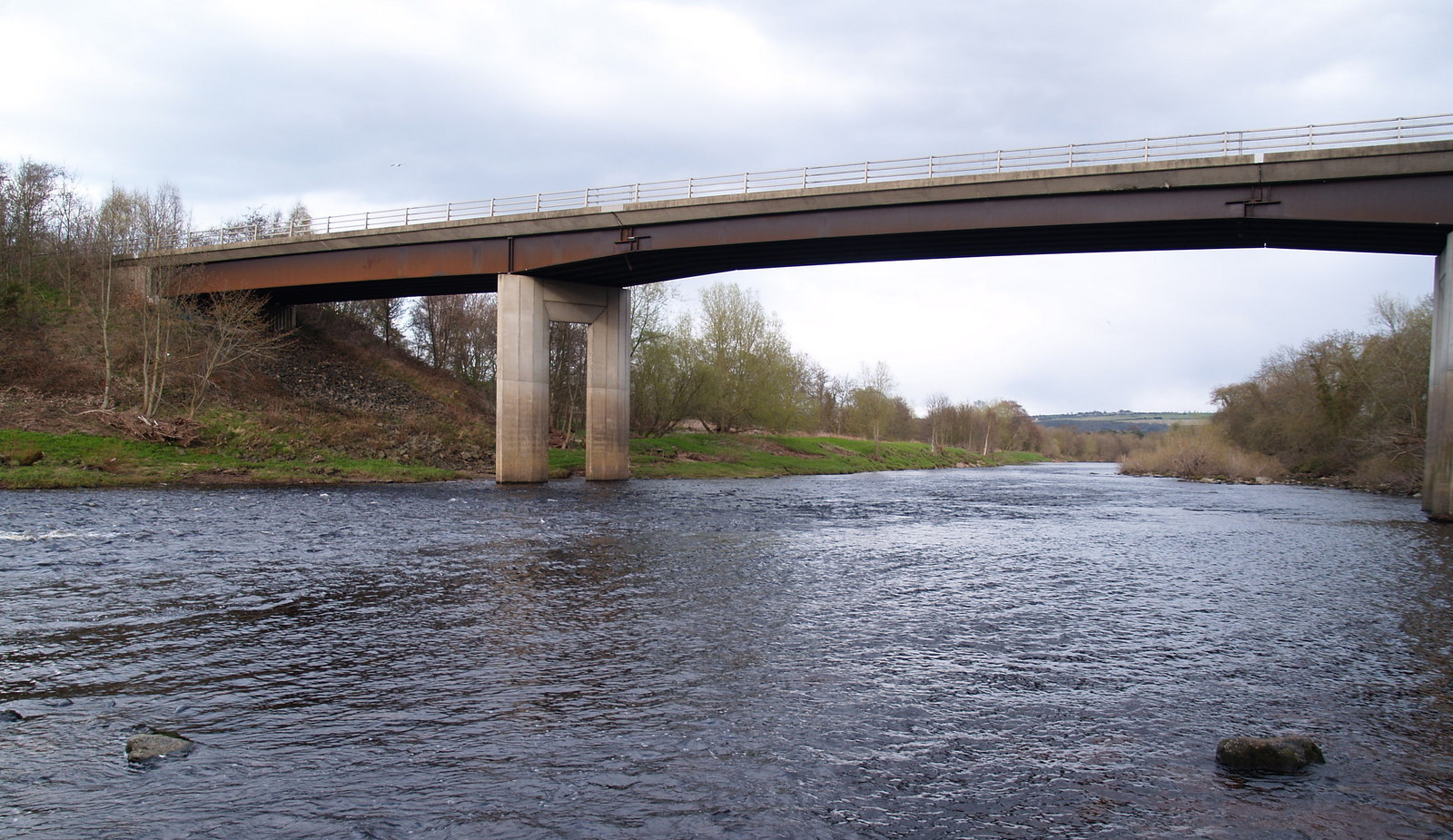
- Styford Bridge
- Coordinates: 54.9514°N 1.9526°W
- OS grid reference: NZ030618
- Carries: A68
- Crosses: River Tyne
- Locale: Northumberland
- Preceded by: Corbridge Bridge
- Followed by: Bywell Bridge

Characteristics
- Design: Beam bridge
- Material: Concrete
- No. of spans: 3
- No. of lanes: Dual carriageway

History
- Designer: Tom Smith; Assistant county surveyor
- Constructed by: Northumberland County Council; Eden Construction
- Construction start: 1977
- Construction end: 1979
- Construction cost: £530,000
- Opened: 1979
- Inaugurated: 10 October 1979; by the Duke of Northumberland

Styford Bridge is a modern concrete bridge carrying the A68 road across the River Tyne east of Riding Mill, Northumberland, England and forms part of the A68 bypass of Corbridge.

== History ==
The A68 road from Darlington used to descend the south side of the Tyne valley to the village of Riding Mill, then followed the River Tyne to the road bridge at Corbridge, and from there ran northwest to Jedburgh. The new road descends sharply to the east and crosses the River Tyne about 1 mile (1.6 km) downstream of Riding Mill. The new road carries on northwards to meet the A69 at the Styford roundabout. The A68 and the A69 follow the bypass west for about 3 miles (5 km) to the Stagshaw Road roundabout where the A68 leaves to join the old alignment.

The new link road was opened by the Duke of Northumberland in a ceremony on the bridge. Present were Councillor Robert Barnett, Chairman of Northumberland County Council and Councillor the Reverend Alec Beniams, Chairman of Tynedale District Council. The main contractors for the link road were Northumberland County Council direct labour organisation and Eden Construction of Carlisle Limited. The bridge was the main responsibility of the county council labour force and was approved by the Royal Fine Art Commission. The bridge, which cost £530,000, was personally designed by Tom Smith, assistant county surveyor.

== Air crash ==
On 9 January 1990, two RAF jets collided in mid-air over the Tyne Valley, and one crashed to earth. The two-man crew from one aircraft, a Tornado ZA394 from RAF Laarbruch in West Germany, ejected to safety. The other plane, a Jaguar XZ108, managed to stay in the air and safely divert to RAF Leeming in Yorkshire. The pilot and navigator from the Tornado were both injured. Wreckage from the crash fell onto the bridge; this caused minor damage to the road surface and to both safety barriers.

Next bridge upstream	River Tyne	Next bridge downstream
Corbridge Bridge; B6321	Styford Bridge; Grid reference NZ030618	Bywell Bridge; B6309
