= A186 road (England) =

Road in Tyne and Wear, England

Coordinates: 54.96482°N 1.55302°W

A186

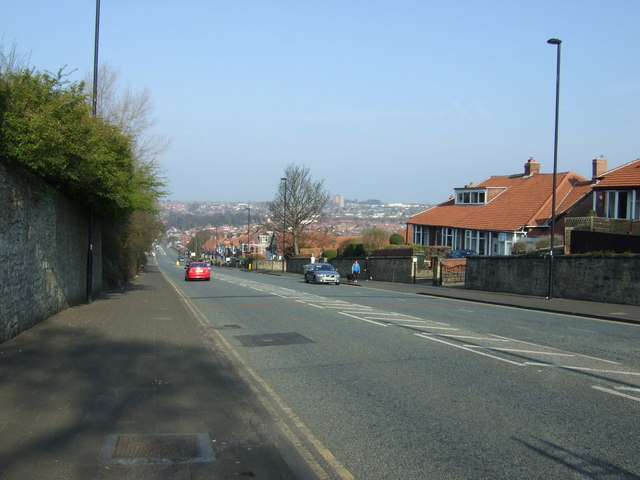
- West Road (A186)

Route information
- Length: 14 mi (23 km)

Major junctions
- West end: A1 Junction 75, eastern end of A69
- A1; A69 A191 A189 A167 A167(M) A187 A193 A1058 A191; A19 A192
- East end: A192, Earsdon

Location
- Country: United Kingdom
- Constituent country: England

Road network
- Roads in the United Kingdom; Motorways; A and B road zones

The A186 is a road in Tyne and Wear, England. It runs between the A1 Junction 75, and the eastern end of the A69 to the A192 in Whitley Bay. It follows the old A69 into Newcastle-upon-Tyne city centre.

== Route ==
The road starts at the Denton Burn Interchange, on the A1 at Junction 75, which also marks the eastern end of the A69. The road heads east along West Road and Westgate Road through the western suburbs of Newcastle upon Tyne. This road runs parallel to Hadrian's Wall, although none of that remains in this area.

A set of traffic lights at a junction with the A189 marks the edge of the city centre and the start of a one-way system.. Eastbound traffic continues ahead along Westgate Road, whilst westbound traffic uses the parallel Neville Street, and a small section of St James' Boulevard.

Continuing east, the A186 continues as Mosley Street. At the eastern end, it reaches the Swan House Roundabout, which is where the A167(M) commences its journey to the north. To the south, the A167 crosses the Tyne Bridge to the town of Gateshead.

A short while afterwards, after crossing under the East Coast Main Line, you find yourself at another one-way system. This time, eastbound traffic follows Melbourne Street and Pandon Bank before it can next see a two-way road, meanwhile westbound traffic continues following City Road. City Road then runs next to the River Tyne, where it meets the B1600.

After crossing the Ouseburn the A186 runs to the south of Byker before looping along with the river and heading north through Walker to reach the edge of Wallsend. A roundabout is met on the A187 and the road multiplexes along it to the east for around 0.6 miles (0.97 km) to a set of traffic lights, where it regains its number and heads north through the centre of Wallsend town centre. It goes under the Tyne and Wear Metro, and crosses the A193 at traffic lights before reaching the A1058.

The A186 continues north and reaches open country after about a mile. However, a short distance later it reaches a roundabout on the A191 and multiplexes along that for a couple of miles to the east. It regains its number at roundabout with the A19 and, bypasses Shiremoor to end at a roundabout on the A192 at Earsdon.

== History ==
The A186 is described in the 1922 Road Lists as Newcastle – Walker – Wallsend. It started to the east of the city centre on the A695 Pilgrim Street and continued east along the remainder of Pilgrim Street and onto City Road as it does now. The road then followed its current route until Walker, where it ran along Fisher Street and onto Neptune Road to go through Wallsend to end back on the A695 (now A193). The road now runs to the west of this route; Neptune Road is now largely the A187.

The A186 was quickly extended north from Wallsend to reach the A188 at East Benton. The A188 was diverted after World War II and the A191 extended along this section of it. This left the ex-A188 through Shiremoor, which became an extension of the A186. Shiremoor was bypassed in the 2000s.

The western end of the A186 did not move for some years. When the A1 was diverted onto the western bypass in the 1990s, this brought about a major renumbering in the area. The A186 was therefore extended west along what was the A6115 (although for many years it was the A69) as far as the new bypass.
