= A167 road =

Road in north east England

A167

Major junctions
- North end: Topcliffe
- A1(M): A1; A61; A66; A67; A68; A168; A177; A183; A184; A186; A187; A189; A191; A684; A688; A689; A690; A691; A693; A1058; A1150
- North end: Kenton Bar

Location
- Country: United Kingdom
- Constituent country: England
- Counties: North Yorkshire, Co. Durham, Tyne & Wear
- Primary destinations: Newcastle upon Tyne, Gateshead, Durham, Darlington

Road network
- Roads in the United Kingdom; Motorways; A and B road zones

The A167 and A167(M) is a road in North East England. It is partially a trunk road and partially a motorway, where it is commonly referred to as Newcastle Central Motorway. Most of the road's route was formerly that of the A1, until it was re-routed with the opening of the A1(M) in the 1960s.

== Route ==
The route starts from the A168 at Topcliffe, North Yorkshire and runs to Cowgate, Tyne and Wear where the route splits in two. The northern fork continues to Kenton Bar, where it meets the A1 and the A696, while the southern fork heads west, again terminating at the A1, this time at Westerhope.

From the Topcliffe A168 Junction, the route runs north through Northallerton, and crosses the A66 road just east of the A66(M) section. It runs on through Darlington, across A1(M) junction 59, and on to Newton Aycliffe, Ferryhill, Durham and Chester-le-Street.

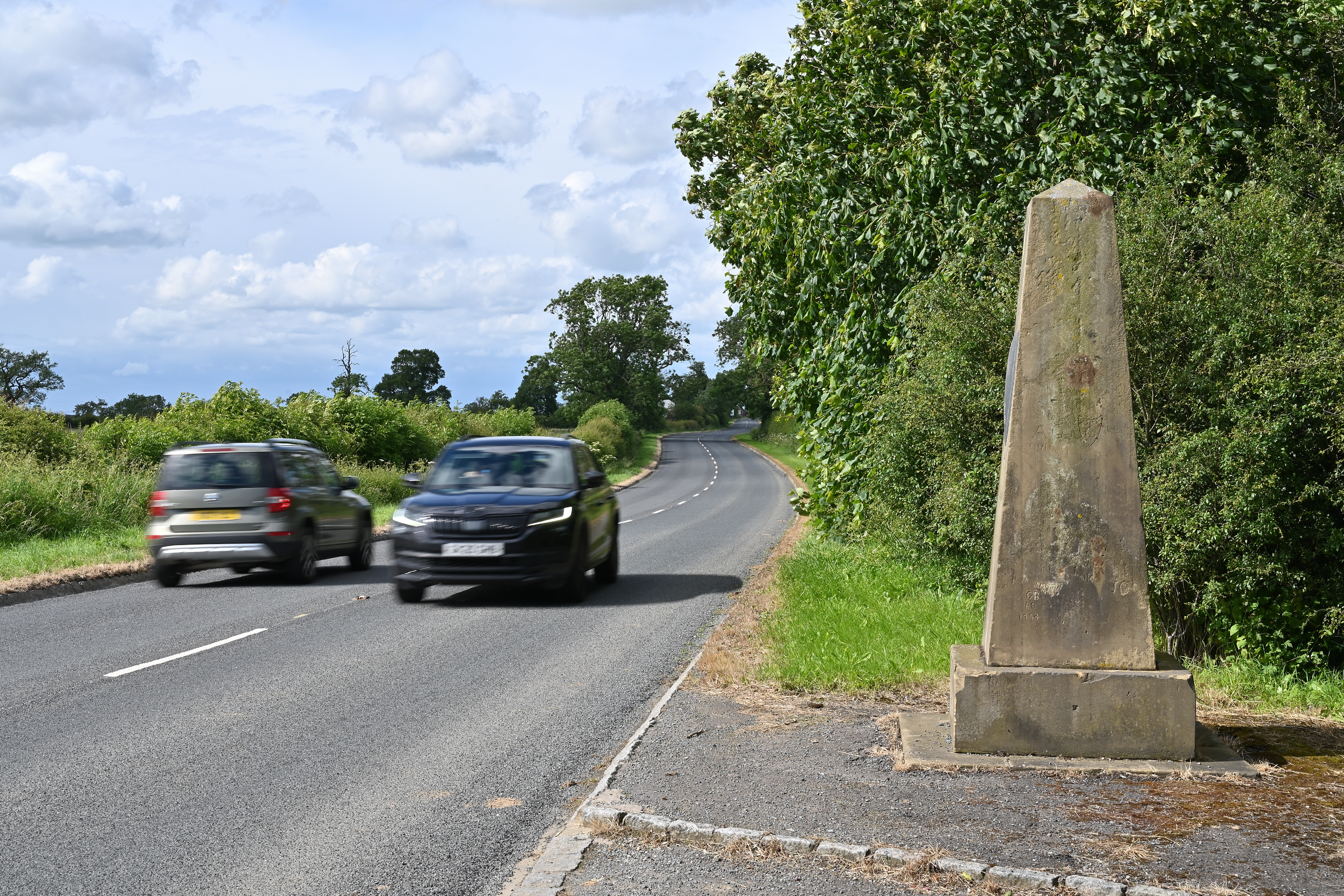
A167 road near Northallerton looking north with the Battle of the Standard monument on the right

The A167 bypass at Chilton near Ferryhill was completed and opened to traffic on 20 June 2005.

Construction had started in 2004, 65 years after first proposed when the route was still the A1.

Beyond Chester-le-Street the A167 continues to A1(M) junction 63 and through Birtley before crossing the A1 at the junction near the Angel of the North. (The first route of the Great North Road ran via Wrekenton on the present B1296. The second route ran via Low Fell on the A167. The third route ran from the A1(M) junction 65 via the A194(M) and the A19 Tyne Tunnel, to the Wideopen A1/A19 Junction.)

The start point of the Great North Run is on the A167(M) Central Motorway in Newcastle.

== A167(M) ==
A167(M)
- Location: Tyne & Wear
- Length: 1.1 mi (1.8 km)
- Existed: 1975–present

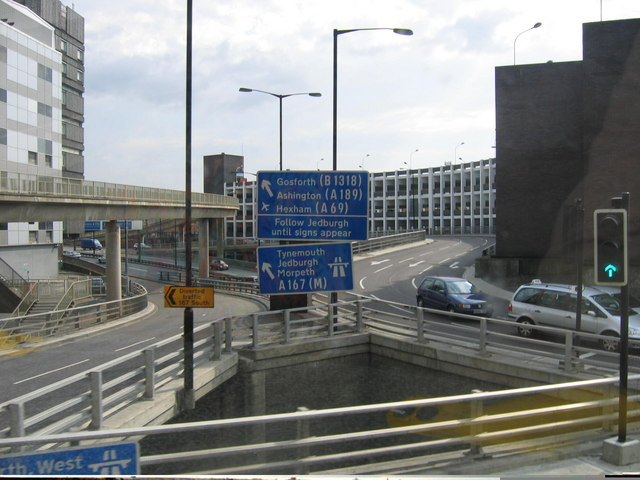
Sliproads to/from A167(M) at Swan House junction

The A167 continues through Gateshead across the Tyne Bridge into Newcastle upon Tyne, where it becomes the A167(M) Newcastle Central Motorway for a short distance. After the city centre it reverts to dual carriageway to its terminus at the Kenton Bar A1/A696 junction.

Originally the road was the A1(M), but changes to the route of the A1 have caused changes to the route number. When the A1 was re-routed through the Tyne Tunnel, it was renumbered as the A6127(M) – becoming one of only two four-digit, Axxxx(M) motorways, the other being the A6144(M) motorway. After the construction of the A1 western bypass, the Tyne Tunnel became the A19 and the A6127(M) became the A167(M).

The A167(M) is unusual due to having a slip road leading from an unclassified road directly onto the right-hand ("fast") lane at Camden Street, a result of its two-tier construction. However, as of late 2011, this slip road is closed. It also has other junctions where entry to and exit from the motorway is via the outside lane, which can lead to a lot of weaving and conflicting traffic movement. The A167(M) is subject to a 50 mph (80 km/h) speed limit throughout.

=== Construction ===
The £7.7-million contract was for 3 miles (4.8 km) miles, given to Costain, who started work in 1972. It opened to traffic in 1975.

=== Junctions ===
County	Location	Junction	Destinations (NB)	Destinations (SB)	Notes
Tyne and Wear	Newcastle City Centre	Town Moor	Jedburgh, Newcastle Airport (A696), Hexham (A69), Morpeth (A1) A167 B1318 – City Centre; B1318 – Gosforth	Northern terminus	Road continues northward as A167
Tyne and Wear	Newcastle City Centre	Jesmond Road	Tynemouth, the EAST (A1058)		
Tyne and Wear	Newcastle City Centre	New Bridge Street	B1307 – City Centre Wallsend (A193)		Exit to Carliol Square from northbound only. Entry from Carliol Square to northbound and southbound via roundabout.
Tyne and Wear	Newcastle City Centre	New Bridge Street	Carliol Square	No access	Exit to Carliol Square from northbound only. Entry from Carliol Square to northbound and southbound via roundabout.
Tyne and Wear	Newcastle City Centre	Pilgrim Street	Southern terminus	The SOUTH, Gateshead (A1(M)) A167; Walker, City Centre (A186)	Road continues southwards as A167.
1.000 mi = 1.609 km; 1.000 km = 0.621 mi: Incomplete access

== Future ==
In June 2019, North Yorkshire County Council prioritised a scheme to construct a bypass on the A167 around the town of Northallerton in North Yorkshire. This would be a north–south road which was costed at £40 million in 2019.
