= A68 road =

Major road in the United Kingdom

Coordinates: 55.29268°N 2.31144°W

A68

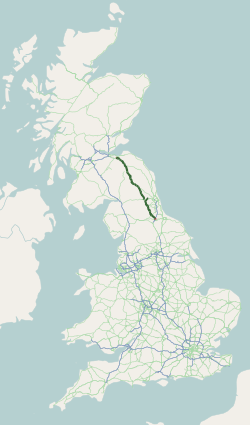

Route information
- Length: 127.9 mi (205.8 km)

Major junctions
- From: A167 in Darlington

- A1(M) near Darlington; A69 in Bywell; A696 near Rochester; A6091 near Melrose

- To: A720 near Danderhall

Location
- Country: United Kingdom
- Counties: England: County Durham; Northumberland; Scotland: Scottish Borders; Midlothian; East Lothian
- Primary destinations: Bishop Auckland; Consett; Corbridge; Jedburgh; Edinburgh

Road network
- Roads in the United Kingdom; Motorways; A and B road zones
← A67	→ A69

The A68 is a major road in the United Kingdom, running from Darlington in England to the A720 in Edinburgh, the capital of Scotland. It crosses the Anglo-Scottish border at Carter Bar and is the only road to do so for some distance either way; the next major crossings are the A697 from Coldstream to Cornhill-on-Tweed in the east, and the A7 near Canonbie to the west.

== Route ==
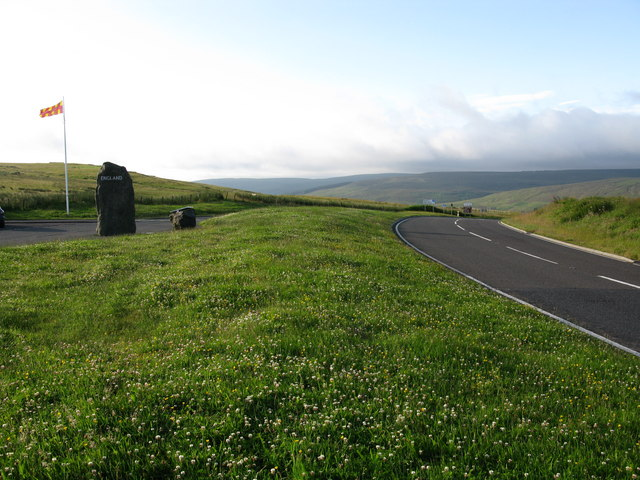
Border at Carter Bar

The southernmost section of the A68, as it leaves Darlington, has been described as a "rustbelt". In January 2022 there was a proposal to widen key roundabouts in Darlington to ease traffic flow. The road crosses the A1(M) at Copshaw Hill Interchange. It bypasses Bishop Auckland and runs through West Auckland, Toft Hill and Tow Law, where Durham County Council has installed a live camera so that drivers can check traffic and weather. It then passes Consett and Corbridge; it used to pass through the centre of the town but since 1979 has run on a bypass to the east, crossing the River Tyne over Styford Bridge. During the construction of the bypass, Roman burials, glass and coins were found, and some traces of Dere Street. To return to the previous route of the A68 it is concurrent with the A69 for 2.9 miles (4.7 km), before turning off north again. The road passes through rural Northumberland, following the route of Dere Street for much of this stretch, which is considered highly scenic.

The A68 crosses the Scottish border at Carter Bar, then runs through the Border towns of Jedburgh, St Boswells, Earlston and Lauder before going over Soutra Hill, passing through Pathhead and by-passing Dalkeith, before terminating at Millerhill Junction on the A720. Until September 2008, the A68 passed through Dalkeith; the opening of a bypass removed large volumes of traffic from the town centre and led to a reduction in accidents. The northern section is used by commuters to Edinburgh, as well as long-distance traffic.

In August 2020 part of the road near Fala collapsed after heavy rain. It reopened the following month.

Part of the A68 is a trunk road from the boundary with Midlothian to the border at Carter Bar, managed by BEAR Scotland for Transport Scotland. The English section as far south as the junction with the A696 to Newcastle was previously a trunk road, but was detrunked in 2001 as part of the government's "New Deal for Trunk Roads in England" report published three years earlier.

Along with the A696, the A68 forms an alternative route between Newcastle Upon Tyne and Edinburgh to the A1 which runs along the coast via Berwick Upon Tweed, and is the more scenic of the two.

== History ==
The A68 follows the Roman Dere Street north of Corbridge, crossing Hadrian's Wall, and shares its route as far as the historic camps of Habitancum and Bremenium. The area contains numerous Roman forts.

The current route across Carter Bar was proposed by John Loudon McAdam in 1828. It was constructed over the following decade, and featured bridges designed by James Jardine.

== Safety ==
The A68 was the 20th most dangerous UK road in 2017. In 2021, the Scottish government announced funding for safety improvements in Pathhead. In England, some MPs have lobbied for similar safety improvements along the road.

== Junction list ==
County	Location	mi	km	Destinations	Notes
County Durham	Darlington	0.0	0.0	A167 / Northgate to A1(M) / A67 / B6279 – Durham, Northallerton, Barnard Castle, Teesside	Southern terminus
County Durham	Darlington– Whessoe boundary	3.0– 3.2	4.8– 5.1	A1(M) – The South, Durham, Newcastle	A1(M) junction 58
County Durham	Coatham Mundeville	4.8	7.7	A6072 northwest (Coatsay Moor Lane) – Shildon, Bishop Auckland	Southeastern terminus of A6072
County Durham	Etherley	10.2	16.4	A688 – Barnard Castle, Bishop Auckland	
County Durham		18.7	30.1	A689 – Wolsingham, Crook, Stanhope, Bishop Auckland	Stanhope and Bishop signed southbound only
County Durham	Castleside	28.1	45.2	A692 northeast (Consett Road) / Church Street / A693 – Consett, Stanley, Stanhope	Southwestern terminus of A692
Northumberland	Broomhaugh and Riding	38.2	61.5	A695 – Riding Mill, Gateshead, Prudhoe	
Northumberland	Broomhaugh and Riding– Bywell boundary	39.0	62.8	Styford Bridge over River Tyne	
Northumberland	Bywell	40.2	64.7	A69 east / B6530 / B6309 – Newcastle, Corbridge, Stamfordham	To B6309 and Stamfordham signed northbound only; southern terminus of A69 concurrency
Northumberland	Corbridge	42.7– 43.2	68.7– 69.5	A69 west / B6529 (Stagshaw Road) to A6079 – Carlisle, Hexham, Corbridge	Northern terminus of A69 concurrency
Northumberland	Chollerton	49.0	78.9	A6079 south / B6342 – Hexham, Rothbury, Barrasford, Chollerford, Colwell	Northern terminus of A6079
Northumberland	Rochester	64.0	103.0	A696 south – Newcastle, Otterburn	Otterburn signed northbound only; northern terminus of A696
Northumberland– Scottish Borders boundary	Rochester– Southdean boundary	77.0	123.9	England–Scotland boundary	
Scottish Borders	Southdean	77.3	124.4	A6088 northwest – Chesters, Bonchester Bridge, Hawick	Southeastern terminus of A6088
Scottish Borders	Bonjedward	89.3– 89.4	143.7– 143.9	A698 northeast – Kelso	Southeastern terminus of A698 concurrency
Scottish Borders	Jedburgh	90.4	145.5	A698 southwest – Hawick, Denholm	Northwestern terminus of A698 concurrency
Scottish Borders	St Boswells	95.9	154.3	A699 – Maxton, Kelso, Selkirk	Brief concurrency
Scottish Borders	Melrose	98.3	158.2	A6091 west (Main Street) to A7 – Melrose, Galashiels, Carlisle	Eastern terminus of A6091
Scottish Borders	Earlston	101.4	163.2	A6105 east (High Street) – Town centre, Gordon, Greenlaw, Kelso, Duns	Western terminus of A6105
Scottish Borders	Oxton	112.1	180.4	A697 south – Coldstream, Greenlaw, Kelso, Duns	Greenlaw, Kelso and Duns signed southeast only; northern terminus of A697
Midlothian	Cranston	124.2	199.9	A6093 northeast – Haddington	Southwestern terminus of A6093
Midlothian	Newbattle– Cranston boundary	124.9	201.0	A6106 north / A6124 north – Dalkeith, Musselburgh, Cousland	Junction; southern terminus of A6106 / A6124
Midlothian– East Lothian boundary	Dalkeith– Inveresk boundary	126.9	204.2	A6094 – Dalkeith, Whitecraig	Junction
Midlothian	Danderhall	127.8– 127.9	205.7– 205.8	A720 / M8 / M9 / A1 – Edinburgh, Glasgow, Stirling, Forth Road Bridge, Berwick-upon-Tweed	Northwestern terminus
1.000 mi = 1.609 km; 1.000 km = 0.621 mi: Concurrency terminus

== See also ==
- British road numbering scheme
