= A69 road =

Major trunk road in northern England

Coordinates: 54.97691°N 2.32543°W

A69

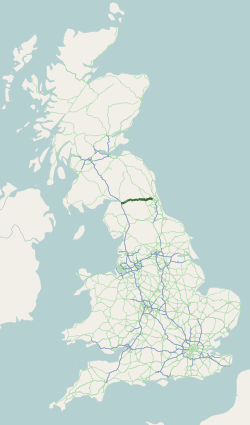

Route information
- Part of
- Length: 54.1 mi (87.1 km)

Major junctions
- East end: A1 / A186 in Newcastle upon Tyne

- A68 near Corbridge; A689 near Brampton; M6 near Carlisle
- West end: A7 in Carlisle

Location
- Country: United Kingdom
- Counties: Tyne and Wear; Northumberland; Cumbria
- Primary destinations: Hexham

Road network
- Roads in the United Kingdom; Motorways; A and B road zones
← A68	→ A70

The A69 is a major northern trunk road in England, running east–west across the Pennines, through the counties of Tyne and Wear, Northumberland and Cumbria. Originally, the road started in the centre of Newcastle upon Tyne then later near Birtley, but since the creation of the A1 Western Bypass around Newcastle upon Tyne, it now starts at Denton Burn, a suburb of Newcastle upon Tyne.

The route from the A1 junction to Carlisle city centre is 54 miles (87 km).

== Settlements on the route ==
- Denton Burn
- West Denton
- Throckley
- (Corbridge)
- (Hexham)
- (Haydon Bridge)
- Bardon Mill
- Melkridge
- (Haltwhistle)
- (Brampton)
- Warwick Bridge
- Warwick-on-Eden
- Botcherby
- Carlisle

Places with parentheses are indicative of historically being on the A69, but have now been bypassed

== Description of the route ==
The road runs westwards from the A1 at Denton Burn in Newcastle upon Tyne through the suburbs of Denton Burn and West Denton before a junction with the A6085 and the B6323. It continues west and passes over what was Hadrian's Wall, which until now has been south of the road, at Milecastle 13 on the wall. Hereafter the road is always south of the wall. The road carries on up the Tyne valley, bypassing the village of Corbridge and the market town Hexham. The A69 crosses the River Tyne west of Hexham (Constantius Bridge), re-crosses it west of the village of Haydon Bridge, and yet again as it bypasses Haltwhistle.

After crossing the border into Cumbria, the A69 by-passes the town of Brampton, before coming to a roundabout junction with the A689 road. The A69 turns left here and travels through the village of Warwick Bridge, which is planned to be by-passed in the future. Following a short piece of dual carriageway, the A69 comes to Junction 43 of the M6 motorway, which skirts the eastern edge of Carlisle.

The A69 into Carlisle has the name Warwick Road, and is known to be one of the most congested roads in the county. At Saint Aidan's church, the A69 turns right up Victoria Place, and meets the A7 road at a busy traffic-light controlled crossroads, where it terminates.

The road forms part of the unsigned Euroroute E18. It is maintained by RoadLink.

Historical sections of road numbered A69

At its eastern end, the A69 historically ran from its current terminus with the A1 at Denton Burn eastward along Westgate Road (now the western end of the A186) in Newcastle upon Tyne, terminating at the junction between Westgate Road and Neville Street in central Newcastle near Newcastle Central station.

The construction of the Gateshead Western Bypass saw the section of A69 from Denton Burn into central Newcastle renumbered A186, with the A69 then passing over Scotswood Bridge and following the Gateshead Western Bypass to Birtley where it joined the A1(M). The later construction of the Newcastle Western Bypass saw the Gateshead Western Bypass section renumbered A1 as the A1 was diverted to the west of Newcastle upon Tyne city centre and over the new Blaydon Bridge, with the A69 curtailed to its current terminus at Denton Burn.

== Standard of route ==
The A69 is a major route linking the north-east and north-west of England, and as such has primary status throughout. For about 20 miles (30 km) between its start at Newcastle and the Hexham by-pass the A69 is dual carriageway standard, and is largely grade separated. The rest of the route, apart from a short dual carriageway section near the M6 Junction 43 is single carriageway, with occasional climbing lanes.

== Haydon Bridge bypass ==
Haydon Bridge was the last village on the A69 in Northumberland to gain a bypass. This was officially opened on Wednesday 25 March 2009 and passes to the south of the village with a new bridge over the River South Tyne to the west of the village.

== Safety ==
A report on the A69 in 2011 noted that in the previous year 82 accidents were recorded with 130 injuries, 10 serious injuries and four deaths. Campaigning has been ongoing to get the section from Hexham to Carlisle dualled to allow vehicles to overtake safely.

== Junction list ==
County	Location	mi	km	Destinations	Notes
Tyne and Wear	Newcastle upon Tyne	0.0	0.0	A1 to A1(M) / A695 / A696 – The South, City (centre), Morpeth, Jedburgh, Gateshead A186 east (West Road) – City (west)	Eastern terminus; western terminus of A186
Tyne and Wear	Newcastle upon Tyne	0.4– 1.0	0.64– 1.6	B6528 – Walbottle, Lemington, Westerhope	Junction; B6528 and Walbottle signed westbound only
Tyne and Wear	Newcastle upon Tyne	2.5– 3.0	4.0– 4.8	A6085 southeast / B6323 – Throckley, Newburn, Ponteland, Darras Hall	Junction; Airport signed westbound only, Darras Hall eastbound only
Northumberland	Heddon-on-the-Wall	4.0	6.4	To B6528 – Heddon-on-the-Wall	Junction; westbound exit and eastbound entrance
Northumberland	Heddon-on-the-Wall– Wylam boundary	5.9	9.5	To B6528 – Ovingham, Wylam, Horsley	Junction; westbound exit and eastbound entrance
Northumberland	Horsley	7.6	12.2	B6528 – Horsley, Heddon	Junction; eastbound exit and westbound entrance
Northumberland	Bywell	11.5	18.5	A68 southeast / B6530 – The South, Darlington, Corbridge, Riding Mill	Riding Mill signed westbound only; eastern terminus of A68 concurrency
Northumberland	Corbridge	14.1– 14.6	22.7– 23.5	A68 northwest / B6529 to B6318 – Jedburgh, Corbridge	Junction; western terminus of A68 concurrency
Northumberland	Sandhoe– Acomb boundary	16.9– 17.3	27.2– 27.8	A6079 south – Hexham	Junction; eastern terminus of A6079 concurrency
Northumberland	Acomb	17.9	28.8	A6079 north to B6318 / B6320 – Rothbury, Acomb, Chollerford, Bellingham, Otterburn	To B6318 signed westbound only, Otterburn eastbound only; western terminus of A6079 concurrency
Northumberland	Haydon Bridge	23.5	37.8	A686 south to B6295 – Alston, Langley, Allendale	Northern terminus of A686
Cumbria	Brampton	43.6	70.2	A6071 west – Brampton, Longtown	Longtown signed westbound only; eastern terminus of A6071
Cumbria	Brampton	44.2	71.1	A689 east – Alston, Hallbankgate	Eastern terminus of A689 concurrency
Cumbria	Brampton	45.9	73.9	A689 west / Greenhill to M6 north / A6071 / B6413 – Carlisle (N), Brampton, Crosby, Longtown	To A6071, B6413 and Longtown signed eastbound only; western terminus of A689 concurrency
Cumbria	Wetheral	52.2	84.0	M6 – The South, The North, Penrith	M6 junction 43
Cumbria	Carlisle	54.1	87.1	Georgian Way / Spencer Street (A7) to A6 / A595 – City centre (S), The South	Western terminus
1.000 mi = 1.609 km; 1.000 km = 0.621 mi: Concurrency terminus; Incomplete access
