= A601(M) motorway =

Former motorway in Lancashire, England

A601(M)

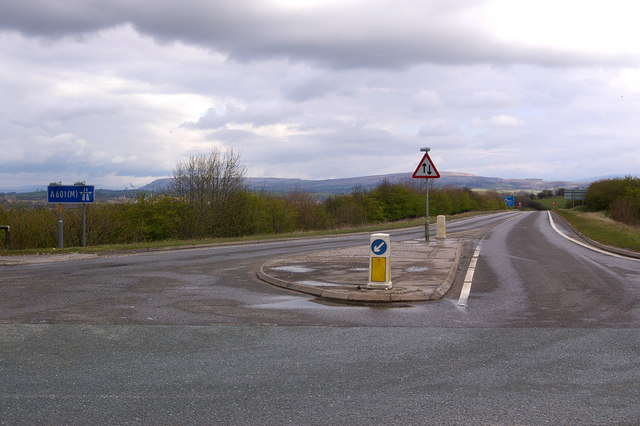
- The former southern end of the A601(M) (now the B6601)

Route information
- Length: 1 mi (1.6 km)
- Status: Extension to the B6254 downgraded to the B6601 in 2020; Remainder of route renumbered as a portion of the A6070 in 2023
- Existed: 1960–2023

Major junctions
- North end: A6
- South end: 1987–2020 B6254 between Over Kellet and Carnforth; 2020–2023 M6 J35

Location
- Country: United Kingdom

Road network
- Roads in the United Kingdom; Motorways; A and B road zones
← A404(M)	→ A627(M)

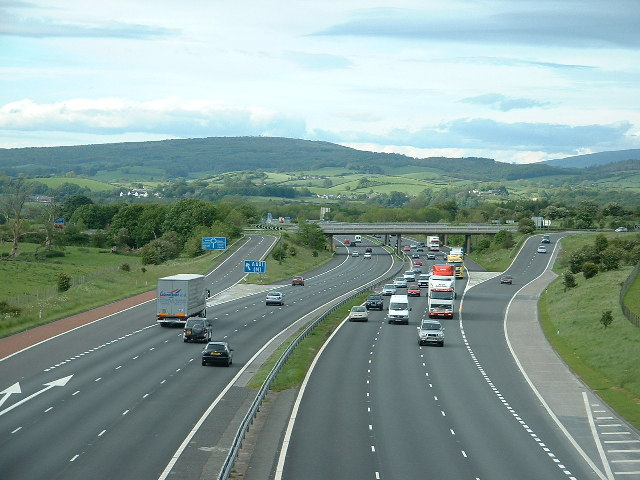
Looking along the M6 to the junction with the A601(M).

The A601(M) was a motorway in Carnforth, Lancashire, England. It was at the time of its downgrade a 1.3 miles (2.1 km) long dual carriageway, meeting the M6 at Junction 35. It is no longer a motorway but remains open, as part of the B6601 and A6070.

Originally built in 1960 as the northern terminus of the M6 on the A6, the road became a spur to the M6 in 1970 when the mainline of the motorway was extended north. A short single-carriageway extension to the south of Junction 35 was opened in 1987, to connect to the B6254, and the whole road was renumbered the A601(M). This southern extension was reclassified as the B6601 in 2020, and the remainder of the motorway became part of the A6070 in 2023.

== History ==
The section between the M6 and junction 35A was originally opened in 1960, as part of the Lancaster Bypass. This was a two-lane motorway. In 1970, the M6 was extended north, and a short spur was left to the A6. The terminal roundabout was given the junction number 35A. Plans existed to extend this as part of an Arnside link road, which would have connected the Furness Peninsula with the M6, but they were scrapped for environmental reasons.

In 1987, a link was constructed with the B6254, to remove traffic for Over Kellet Quarries and Kirkby Lonsdale passing through Carnforth. The road was then renumbered as the A601(M). No junction number was given to this terminus. The numbering A601(M) was somewhat anomalous: normally in the UK such a designation would indicate that the road was the A601 under motorway restrictions. However the A601 is the Derby inner ring road, over 100 miles (160 km) away, and the numbering appears to have been the result of an oversight that this road already existed.

In early 2020 the 1987 link road was downgraded to become the B6601 road to allow for an access for a car dealership to be built on it. In late 2021, Lancashire County Council issued a revocation scheme for the remaining portion of the motorway to be downgraded to non-motorway status. The revocation scheme was approved by the Secretary of State on 7 February 2023, and came into force that day. The road was renumbered as an extension of the A6070, and future works will reduce the speed limit reduced to 50 mph (80 km/h) and remove the hard shoulder in order to reduce maintenance costs.

== Junctions ==
The junctions below are depicted as per 1987-2020:

A601(M) motorway
Southbound exits	Junction	Northbound exits
Carnforth, Over Kellet, Kirkby Lonsdale B6254	Terminus	Start of motorway
Lake District, Carlisle, Kendal, Barrow-in-Furness, Lancaster, Preston, THE SOUTH M6	J35	Lake District, Carlisle, Barrow-in-Furness, Lancaster, Preston, THE SOUTH M6
Start of motorway	J35a; Terminus	Milnthorpe, Kendal, Morecambe, Carnforth A6

== See also ==
- List of motorways in the United Kingdom
- Great Britain road numbering scheme
