= A689 road =

Road in England

Coordinates: 54.7376°N 2.1269°W

A689

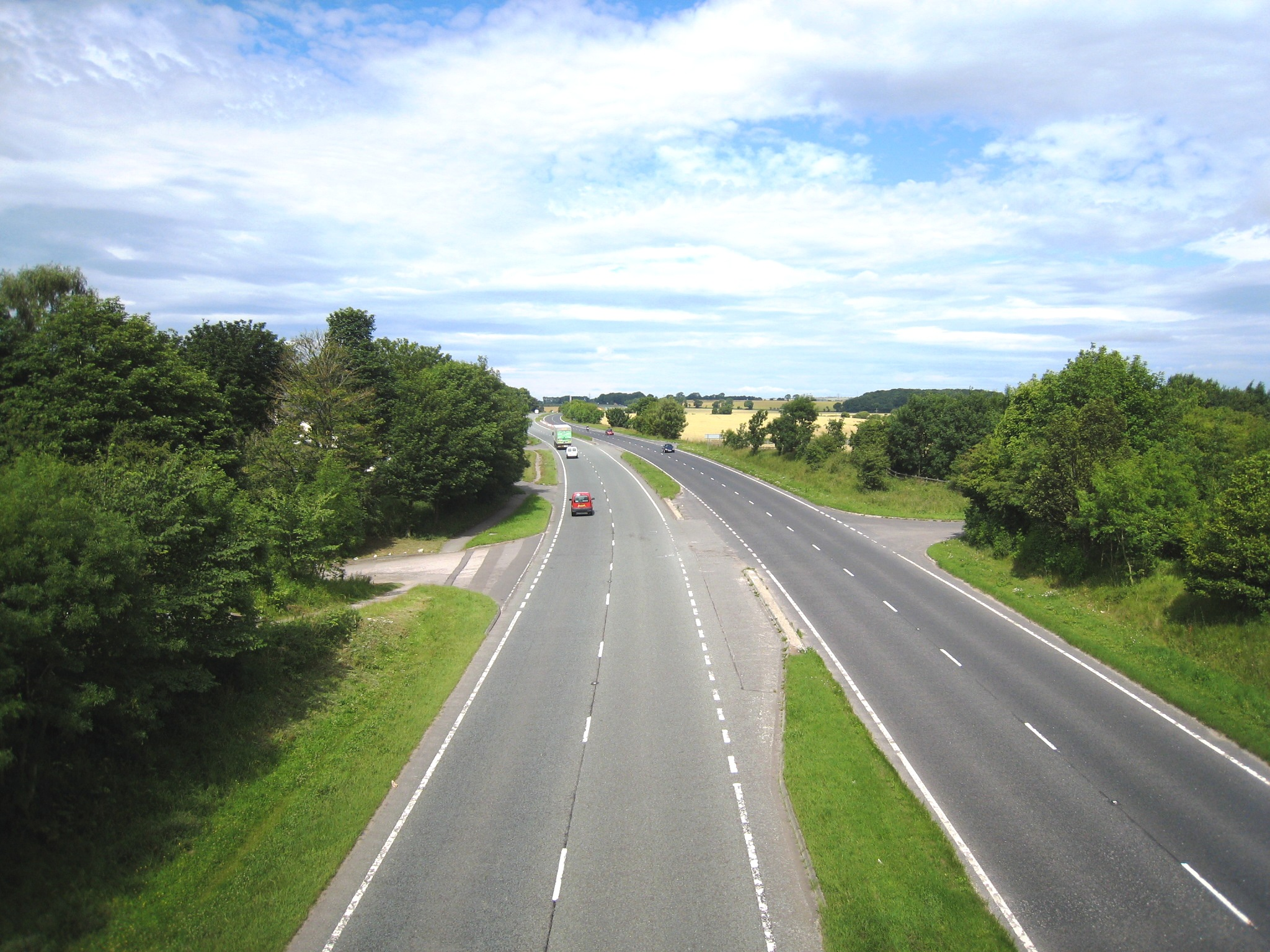
- The A689 road near Tilery Wood

Major junctions
- West end: Carlisle
- A595; A7; M6 Junction 44; A69 A686; A68 A6072 A688 A167 A1(M) (Junction 60) A177; A19 A1185 A178
- East end: Hartlepool

Location
- Country: United Kingdom

Road network
- Roads in the United Kingdom; Motorways; A and B road zones
← A688	→ A690

The A689 is a road in northern England that runs east from the A595, 3.1 miles (5.0 km) to the south-west of Carlisle in Cumbria, to Hartlepool in County Durham.

The road begins south-west of Carlisle, just outside the city at Junction 42 of the M6. The initial 5 miles (8.0 km) stretch was recently constructed as part of the Carlisle Southern Link Road (CSLR).. This project extended the A689 from the A595 west of Carlisle to the Golden Fleece Interchange motorway junction. It cost approximately £260 million and consists of four roundabouts, three road bridges and six foot bridges.

North of the A595, the route continues for 5.13 miles (8.26 km). It was built as the Carlisle Northern Development Route, a road bypassing Carlisle from west to north. Crossing the River Eden and the West Coast Main Line, the road intersects with Junction 44 of the M6 at Greymoorhill.. With the completion of the CSLR, the A689 serves as a partial orbital route connecting Junction 42 to Junction 44 of the M6 around the west of Carlisle.

From Junction 44 of the M6, the A689 runs roughly south-east to a roundabout, with the B6264. From here, the A689 heads east, and crosses the River Irthing at Ruleholme, then it meets the A69 at a roundabout junction. The A689 joins the route of the A69 around part of the Brampton bypass. Near the village of Milton, the A689 turns right, and continues through Milton and Hallbankgate before crossing the border into the county of Northumberland.

The route continues roughly south-east, and re-enters the county of Cumbria just north of the small market town of Alston. After passing through Alston, the A689 eventually crosses the border into County Durham, where the route still heads gradually south-east through Weardale. At Killhope Cross between Killhope and Nenthead the road reaches a height of 2,056 feet (627 m), making it the highest A road and equal highest paved pass in England (or third highest paved road in England.)

At a roundabout with the A68, the A689 briefly joins the route of the A690, before turning right in the town of Crook (for a few years has bypassed Crook town centre and now uses a new bypass). Heading south-easterly still, the A689 encounters the town of Bishop Auckland, where it temporarily heads north-easterly (where it merges with the A688), before setting off in an easterly direction north of Bishop Auckland.

The A689 meets the A167 at the Rushyford roundabout, then shortly comes across the A1(M) at Junction 58. The A689 by-passes the town of Sedgefield, and becomes dual carriageway standard for the remainder of the route, after the section between Sedgefield and Wynyard was upgraded to dual carriageway in 2001. The A689 meets the A19 near Wolviston, before turning north-east and eventually terminating close to the centre of Hartlepool.

== See also ==
- List of highest paved roads in Europe
- List of mountain passes
