= Ruleholme =

Hamlet in Cumbria, England

Coordinates: 54.932°N 2.795°W

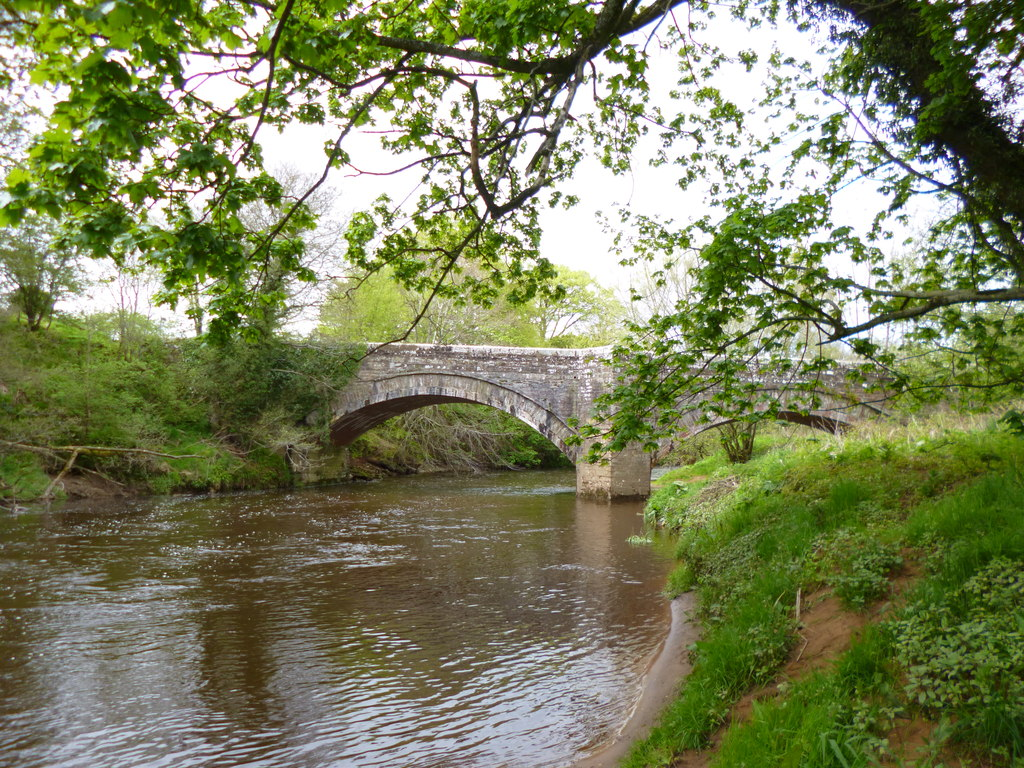
- Ruleholme Bridge

- Location in the former Carlisle district, Cumbria Location within Cumbria
- OS grid reference: NY490600
- Civil parish: Irthington
- Unitary authority: Cumberland
- Ceremonial county: Cumbria
- Region: North West
- Country: England
- Sovereign state: United Kingdom
- Post town: CARLISLE
- Postcode district: CA4
- Dialling code: 01228
- Police: Cumbria
- Fire: Cumbria
- Ambulance: North West
- UK Parliament: Carlisle

Ruleholme is a small hamlet on the A689 road and the River Irthing, in the civil parish of Irthington, in the Cumberland district, in the English county of Cumbria (historically in Cumberland). It is also near Carlisle Lake District Airport.

== Location ==
Ruleholme is located in between the city of Carlisle, to the west and the town of Brampton, to the East on the A689 road.

== Amenities ==
Ruleholme had a pub called The Golden Fleece which was demolished and completely rebuilt as the "Fleece" in 2021.

== Bridges ==
Ruleholme has two bridges both crossing the River Irthing. Ruleholme Bridge is a bridge on a minor road which is the original bridge and was by-passed. The route is now blocked off on one side of the Bridge. Ruleholme New Bridge is a bridge carrying the A689 road traffic, built to by-pass the longer, older route of Ruleholme Bridge.
