= A688 road =

Road in England

Coordinates: 54.6352°N 1.7136°W

A688

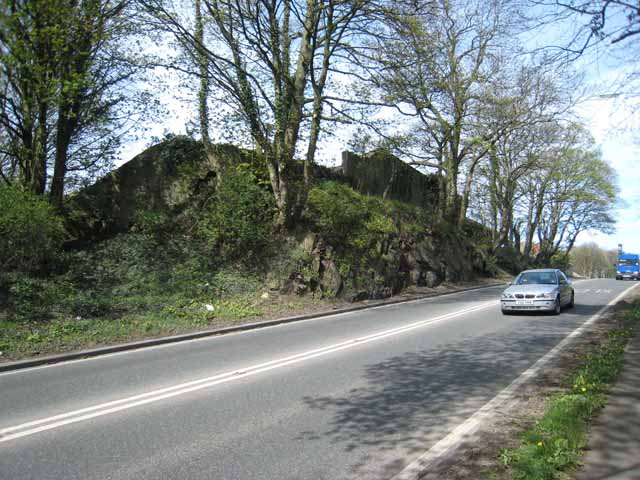
- A688 at Parkhead Farm

Route information
- Length: 25.2 mi (40.6 km)
- History: A181 extension finished 30 October 2008

Major junctions
- South West end: Barnard Castle
- A67; A68 A6072 A689 A167 A177 A1(M) (Junction 61) A181
- North East end: Byers Garth, near Sherburn Hospital

Location
- Country: United Kingdom
- Primary destinations: Bishop Auckland

Road network
- Roads in the United Kingdom; Motorways; A and B road zones
← A687	→ A689

The A688 is a road in County Durham in North East England.

It begins at the junction with the A67 road in Barnard Castle and continues in a north easterly direction for 25 miles (40 km), terminating at the A181 to the east of Durham City.

== Route ==
The road passes through the village of Staindrop, past Raby Castle through West Auckland, Bishop Auckland and on to Spennymoor. It then continues through the Thinford intersection with the A167 to Junction 61 of the A1(M) at Bowburn. The latest extension, which was from the A1(M) Junction 61 to the A181, was opened on 30 October 2008.

== Description ==
The road is single-carriageway except for a short 800 m (870 yd) stretch of dual-carriageway at Spennymoor.
