= Acomb, Northumberland =

Village in Northumberland, England

Coordinates: 54.992°N 2.109°W

Acomb
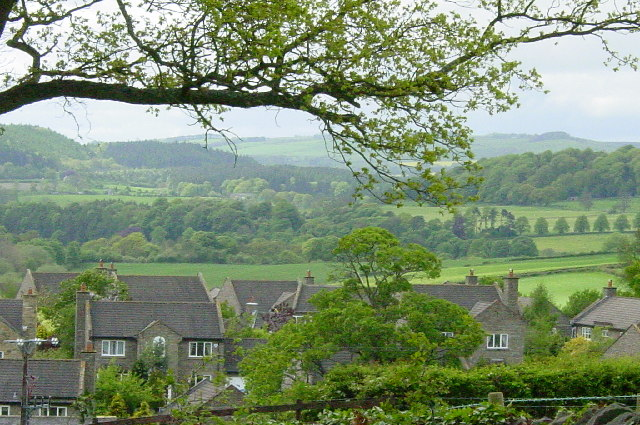
- Acomb rooftops

- Location within Northumberland
- Population: 1,297 (parish, 2021)
- OS grid reference: NY931664
- Unitary authority: Northumberland
- Ceremonial county: Northumberland
- Region: North East
- Country: England
- Sovereign state: United Kingdom
- Post town: Hexham
- Postcode district: NE46
- Dialling code: 01434
- Police: Northumbria
- Fire: Northumberland
- Ambulance: North East
- UK Parliament: Hexham

Acomb is a village and civil parish in Northumberland, England. The village lies 1.5 miles (2.4 km) north of Hexham, its post town. As well as the village itself, the parish covers surrounding rural areas, with the southern boundary of the parish being the River Tyne. At the 2021 census, the parish had a population of 1,297.

== Toponymy ==
The name Acomb is Old English and comes from acum, meaning 'at the oak trees'. The traditional pronunciation of the name was "Yeckam".

== History ==
Some Bronze Age cists have been discovered in this vicinity. Hadrian's Wall runs about 1 mile (1.5 km) to the NE of Acomb, where the site of Chesters Roman Fort is located.

== Governance ==
There are two main tiers of local government covering Acomb, at parish and unitary authority level: Acomb Parish Council and Northumberland County Council. The county council is also a member of the North East Combined Authority, led by the directly elected Mayor of the North East. The parish council generally meets at Acomb Village Hall.

For national elections, Acomb forms part of the Hexham constituency.

=== Administrative history ===
Acomb was historically a township in the ancient parish of Hexham. By the 14th century, a chapel of ease dedicated to St John of Beverley had been built at St John Lee, to the south of Acomb village. The chapelry served by St John's Church covered ten townships from the old Hexham parish north of the Tyne. The chapelry of St John Lee subsequently became a separate parish.

The township of Acomb (sometimes called West Acomb, to distinguish it from another Acomb township at Bywell) took on civil functions under the poor laws from the 17th century onwards, and therefore became a separate civil parish in 1866 when the legal definition of 'parish' was changed to be the areas used for administering the poor laws. The name of the Church of England ecclesiastical parish covering Acomb remains St John Lee.

== Economy ==
In 1886, the coal mine at Acomb employed 200 workers, and 51,000 tons of coal per year were raised.

== Religious sites ==
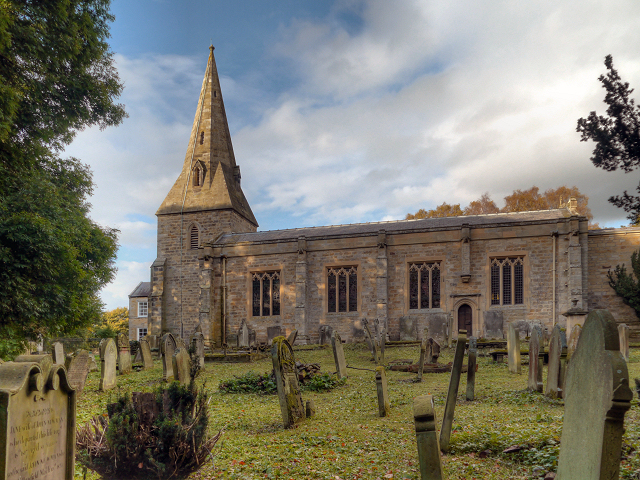
The Parish Church of St John Lee

The church of St John Lee, to the south of Acomb village, is a church dedicated to St John of Beverley, reportedly a local hermit and worker of miracles. The medieval church was rebuilt to the design of John Dobson in 1843 and remodelled and extended in 1886. In 1765, Robert Scott, a Northumbrian piper, was marrying Jean Middlemas. Scott used crutches to walk, but on his wedding day he walked from his home village of Wall, Northumberland to the church without his crutches. He walked back again with a group of fellow pipers.
