= Broomhaugh and Riding =

Civil parish in Northumberland, England

Coordinates: 54.948°N 1.978°W

- Location within Northumberland
- Population: 966 [2011]
- OS grid reference: NZ015615
- Civil parish: Broomhaugh and Riding
- Unitary authority: Northumberland
- Ceremonial county: Northumberland
- Region: North East
- Country: England
- Sovereign state: United Kingdom
- Post town: RIDING MILL
- Postcode district: NE44
- Dialling code: 01434
- Police: Northumbria
- Fire: Northumberland
- Ambulance: North East
- UK Parliament: Hexham

Broomhaugh and Riding is a civil parish in Northumberland, England. It includes the villages of Broomhaugh and Riding Mill. According to the 2001 census, it had a population of 936, increasing to 966 at the 2011 census.

== History ==
The parish was formed on 1 April 1955 through the merger of the former parishes of Broomhaugh and Riding.

== Governance ==
Broomhaugh and Riding is in the parliamentary constituency of Hexham. There is a parish council.
