= Ovington, Northumberland =

Village in Northumberland, England

Coordinates: 54.966°N 1.898°W

Ovington
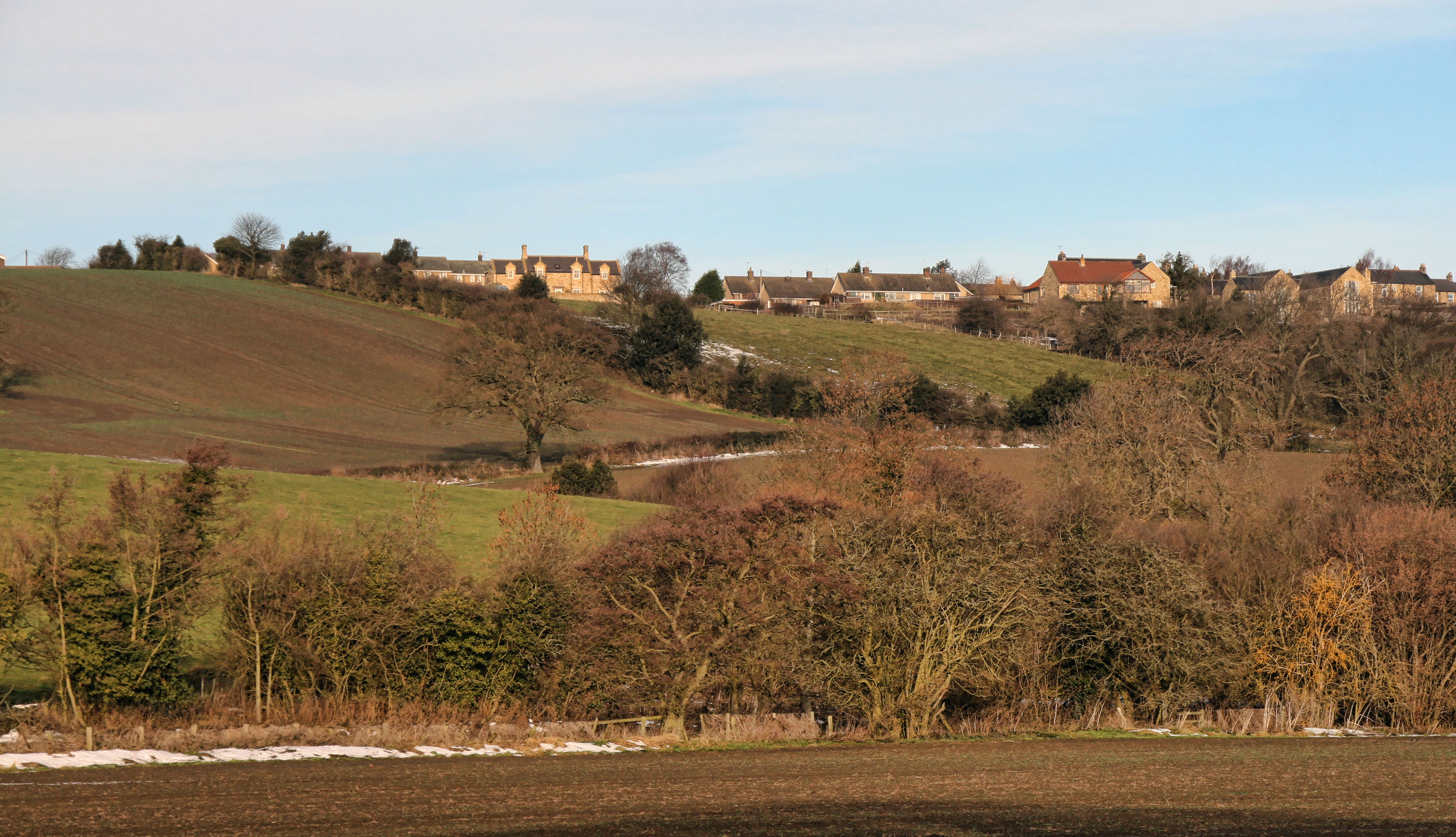
- View

- Location within Northumberland
- Population: 532 (2011)
- OS grid reference: NZ065635
- Unitary authority: Northumberland
- Ceremonial county: Northumberland
- Region: North East
- Country: England
- Sovereign state: United Kingdom
- Post town: PRUDHOE
- Postcode district: NE42
- Dialling code: 01661
- Police: Northumbria
- Fire: Northumberland
- Ambulance: North East
- UK Parliament: Hexham

Ovington is a village and civil parish in the south of Northumberland, England. It is located on a hill above the north bank of the River Tyne.

== History ==
Very little has been found from prehistoric times except for a cup and ring marked stone at Hunters Hill. It had an extraordinary range of symbols carved on it and is our only clue to the people who lived here in the Neolithic.

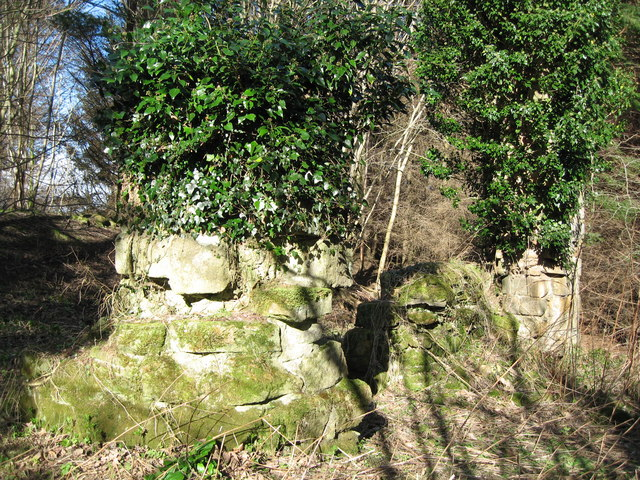
Nafferton Castle

There is a big gap in the evidence for the rest of the prehistoric period, as well as the Roman and early medieval periods. The next hint of life in the parish comes in medieval times. Ovington Hall has some 14th-century stonework in its outbuildings and may have an old building at its core.

To the north on the west bank of the Whittle Burn adjacent to the A69 are the vestiges of the medieval Nafferton Castle.

At a time when northern England was suffering the ravages of war with Scotland, Ovington seems to have escaped without mention. Likewise, it has no trace of the 16th and 17th century defensive farmhouses, called bastles, that are found elsewhere in the county. The earliest buildings in Ovington seem to have been built in the 16th and 17th centuries. Village Farm may be one of the earliest and, although it is a little like a bastle, its walls are much thinner and would not have withstood any prolonged attack. Hunter's Cottage is another 17th or 18th century farm and is a rare survival of an earlier type of farm.

The 18th and 19th centuries were a fairly prosperous time for the border region of England and fine buildings such as Ovington Hall were built. As well as developments in farm methods and practice, new industries developed, such as brewing at the Old Brewery.

== Governance ==
Ovington is in the parliamentary constituency of Hexham.

Ovington is in the electoral ward of Stocksfield and Bywell for Northumberland County Council elections.

== Geography ==
Whittle Dene is a deep woody dell which stretches southwards & joins the Tyne east of Ovington. The waters of this dene (peculiarly soft & clear) are the most celebrated in the north of England for whitening linen cloth. Mr. William Newton's bleach green, situated on this stream at the confluence of the Tyne is known and famed throughout all these northern parts. (Mackenzie 1825). The Whittle Burn can be traced back to the present day Whittledean Water Works on either side of the Roman Wall near Welton Hall.
