= Riding Mill =

Village in Northumberland, England

Coordinates: 54.948°N 1.978°W

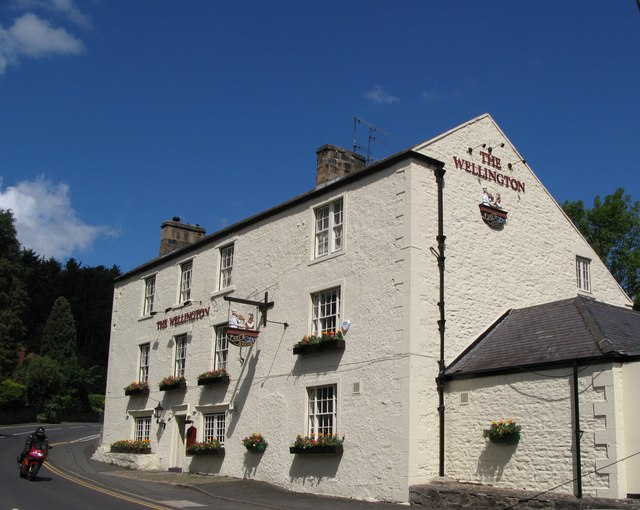
- The Wellington public house

- Location within Northumberland
- OS grid reference: NZ015615
- Civil parish: Broomhaugh and Riding
- Unitary authority: Northumberland
- Ceremonial county: Northumberland
- Region: North East
- Country: England
- Sovereign state: United Kingdom
- Post town: RIDING MILL
- Postcode district: NE44
- Dialling code: 01434
- Police: Northumbria
- Fire: Northumberland
- Ambulance: North East
- UK Parliament: Hexham

Riding Mill is a village near Hexham in Northumberland, England. It is part of the civil parish of Broomhaugh and Riding. It is served by Riding Mill railway station and by a frequent bus service on the route from Hexham to Newcastle.

Riding Mill is notable as the location of Riding Mill pumping station. Up until here the water released from Kielder Water uses the River Tyne but at Riding Mill it is pumped to parts of Tyne and Wear and over the hills to Teesside.

Leaving the village towards Hexham, Hollin Hill Terrace is situated on the left. Very little information is available on these eight dwellings but they are an example of Victorian architecture. This terrace was not shown on maps of the area prior to 1850, but appear on a map dated between 1850/1894.

== History ==
Mackenzie (1825) wrote — The Riding Mill is built upon a mountain brook called Dipton Burn – which it was often hazardous to pass, but in 1822 a good bridge was built across it. It is 80 feet (24 m) in length and 28 feet (8.5 m) in breadth. In recent times the road from the south coming into Riding Mill was a notorious traffic hazard because of the steep slope and the bends. A safety pit of small stones was constructed to halt vehicles that got out of control. The hill was also difficult to climb the other way, but a new road bypasses Riding Mill.

=== Styford ===
Directly north across the River Tyne is Styford Hall, the chief residence of the former township of Styford in Bywell St Andrew parish.

=== January 1990 air incident ===
On Tuesday 9 January 1990 at 14.49, the tail fin of Panavia Tornado 'ZA394', from RAF Laarbruch, was hit by the wing of one of three SEPECAT Jaguars, 'XZ108', flying from RAF Coltishall.

The Tornado pilots ejected, which broke their legs. The debris hit traffic on the A68 at Styford Bridge. The Jaguar landed at RAF Leeming.

== Governance ==
Riding Mill is in the parliamentary constituency of Hexham, Joe Morris of the Labour Party is the Member of Parliament.

Prior to Brexit, for the European Parliament its residents voted to elect MEP's for the North East England constituency.

For Local Government purposes it belongs to Northumberland County Council a unitary authority.

== Landmarks ==
The corn mill existed in mediæval times and was granted to the monastery at Blanchland. It was a good source of profit because all the tenants had to bring their corn to be ground here and hand mills were forbidden by law. Since crossing the burn was difficult a pack horse bridge was constructed 1599–1600. In recent times the mill has been converted into a residence, but its appearance has been kept. The 18-foot (5.5 m) water wheel was of the overshot type and a dam 500 yards (460 m) above the mill retained the water for its use.

The large house opposite became the Wellington Hotel. It is a handsome structure and carries the date 1660 above the door. The letters are considered to be the initials of Thomas Errington and his wife Ann Carnaby. T.B. has come about by the Boultflour family living here; they were millers and probably altered the E into a B. The house gained some notoriety by its association with witchcraft. Anne Armstrong, the witch finder, lived at Birchesnook. In 1673 she accused Anne, wife of Thomas Baites of Morpeth, a tanner, of frequenting witches' meetings at Riding Bridge-end, where she danced with the devil. She also claimed to have seen Anne Forster of Stocksfield, Anne Dryden of Prudhoe and Lucy Thompson of Mickley, supping with theire proctector which they called their god in the Riding house. But the charges were dismissed at the Morpeth Quarter Sessions, the magistrates not being impressed with the evidence.

Other significant buildings include Oaklands Manor, Wentworth Grange, Underwood Hall, and former vicarage The Glebe.

Shepherd's Dene, a retreat house shared by the Church of England's dioceses of Durham and Newcastle, is located nearby at Ridingmill Burn.

== Transport ==
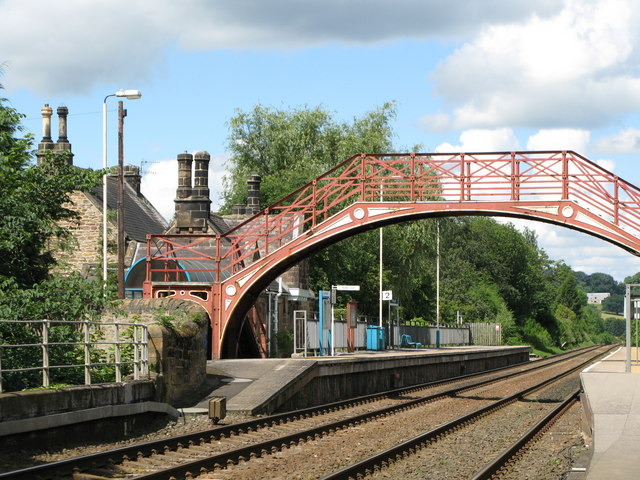
Riding Mill railway station

Road

Riding Mill is linked to Newcastle and the A1 by the A695 which passes through the village. The A68 road lies about 0.5 miles (0.8 km) to the east, linking it to Jedburgh and Darlington.

Railway

The village is served by Riding Mill railway station on the Tyne Valley line. The line was opened in 1838, and links Newcastle with Carlisle in Cumbria. The line follows the course of the River Tyne through Northumberland.

Passenger services on the Tyne Valley Line are operated by Northern. The line is also heavily used for freight.

== Public services ==
The only remaining village pub is 'The Wellington' as the two others have closed (The Railway and The Broomhaugh).

== Education ==
It is in the catchment area for Queen Elizabeth High School, Hexham.

== Sporting Clubs ==
- Riding Mill Cricket Club have been established in the village since 1880 and currently compete in the Northumberland & Tyneside and West Tyne Senior Cricket Leagues.
- Riding Mill FC formed in 2017 and compete in the Hexham & District Sunday Football League.
- Riding Mill Tennis club is based on Millfield Road and is affiliated with the Northumberland Lawn Tennis Association and compete in the Northumberland & Durham tennis leagues.

== Notable residents ==
- Tom Graveney - England test cricketer
- Robert Smith Surtees, Victorian novelist and founder of the hunting magazine "The Field" born at The Riding (cottage)
