= A696 road =

Major road in north-eastern England

Coordinates: 55.1299°N 1.9449°W

A696

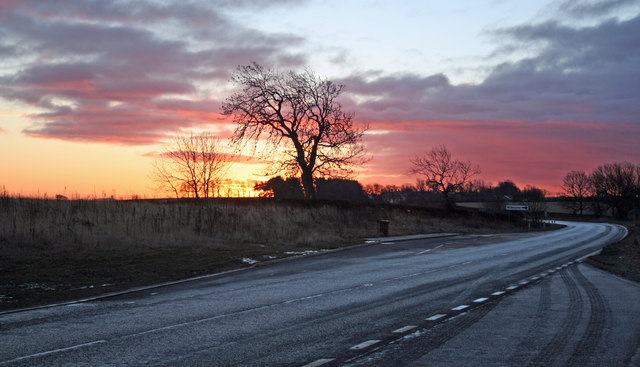
- The A696 in Northumberland

Major junctions
- North end: Otterburn
- A68; A1 A167
- South end: Newcastle upon Tyne

Location
- Country: United Kingdom
- Primary destinations: Ponteland; Newcastle Airport; Newcastle upon Tyne

Road network
- Roads in the United Kingdom; Motorways; A and B road zones
← A695	→ A697

The A696 is a major road in Northern England, that runs from Otterburn in Northumberland to Newcastle upon Tyne.

== Route ==
The A696 begins at a junction with the A68 road (to Edinburgh and Corbridge). It heads in a south-easterly direction through the village of Otterburn, and then past Kirkwhelpington. It meets the B6342 road (to Rothbury) and then goes through the village of Belsay and the small town of Ponteland. The A696 becomes dual carriageway standard just before passing Newcastle Airport, with the junctions after the airport all being grade separated. The A696 terminates at a roundabout with the A1 road (to Gateshead) and the A167 road (into Newcastle city centre).
