= Denton Burn =

Coordinates: 54.983219°N 1.693912°W

- Location within Tyne and Wear
- OS grid reference: NZ195654
  - London: 242 miles (389 km)
- Metropolitan borough: Newcastle upon Tyne
- Metropolitan county: Tyne and Wear
- Region: North East
- Country: England
- Sovereign state: United Kingdom
- Post town: NEWCASTLE UPON TYNE
- Postcode district: NE15
- Dialling code: 0191
- Police: Northumbria
- Fire: Tyne and Wear
- Ambulance: North East
- UK Parliament: Newcastle upon Tyne Central

Denton Burn is an area located in Central Newcastle, approximately 4 miles (6 km) to the west of the city centre of Newcastle upon Tyne in England, United Kingdom. It is officially designated a suburb of the city, where it is linked to Carlisle by the A69 and A1 roads. The West Road also runs to the north of Denton Burn allowing access to the city centre and also to the junction which leads to the A69 road and A1 road.

== Wall ==
A small section of Hadrian's Wall is located in the suburb. This is the first substitutional length of wall that can be seen west of Newcastle. It was depicted in a drawing in 1863 with an apple tree growing on it. The site also contains the remains of a turret. A milecastle is presumed buried beneath a modern housing development. The turret and attached wall are maintained as a single property by English Heritage (known as "Denton Hall Turret").

== Education ==
There are three schools located in Denton Burn, St. Bedes RC Primary School, Broadwood Primary School and St. Cuthbert's High School. Other amenities like the library, stores and field are essential to the area.
