= A695 road =

Road in Northern England

A695

Major junctions
- West end: Hexham; 54.9703°N 2.0970°W
- A6079; A68; A1; A69 A189 A186
- East end: Newcastle upon Tyne; 54.9684°N 1.6218°W

Location
- Country: United Kingdom
- Constituent country: England

Road network
- Roads in the United Kingdom; Motorways; A and B road zones

A695 road is a road in Northern England linking Newcastle upon Tyne, Tyne and Wear, with Hexham, Northumberland.

== Motorway ==
It was part of the proposed A695(M) Shields Road Motorway.
