= Bellister Bridge =

Concrete bridge across the River South Tyne at Haltwhistle in Northumberland, England

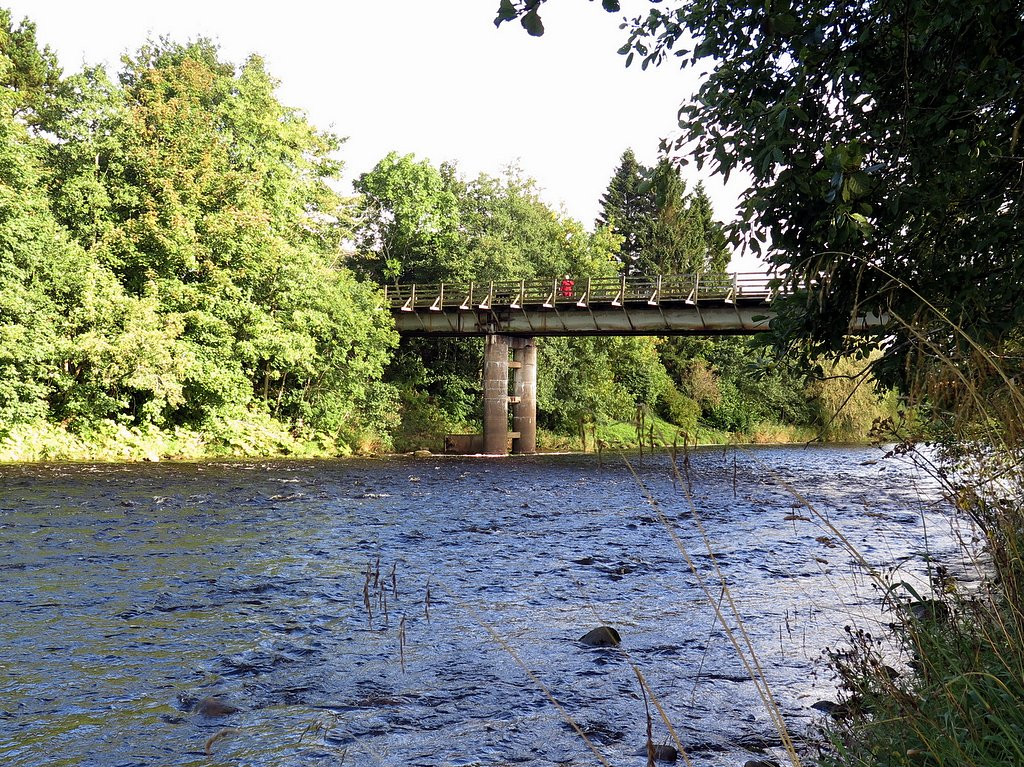
- Bellister Bridge
- Coordinates: 54.9642°N 2.4704°W
- OS grid reference: NY699633
- Carries: Cycles; Pedestrians
- Crosses: River South Tyne
- Locale: Northumberland
- Preceded by: Haltwhistle A69 Bridge, West
- Followed by: Blue Bridge, Haltwhistle

Characteristics
- Design: Beam bridge
- Material: Concrete deck on steel girders
- Pier construction: Concrete

History
- Construction end: 1967
- Opened: 1967
- Replaced by: Haltwhistle A69 Bridge, West for motor vehicles

Bellister Bridge is a concrete bridge across the River South Tyne at Haltwhistle in Northumberland, England.

== History ==
The bridge, which was designed to provide road access to the village of Plenmeller on the south bank of the river, was completed in 1967. After the Haltwhistle bypass opened, the road was no longer required and it has solely been used a footbridge since the late 1990s. The bridge also provides access to Bellister Castle on the south bank of the river.

| Next bridge upstream | River South Tyne | Next bridge downstream |
| Haltwhistle A69 Bridge, West; A69 | Bellister Bridge; Grid reference NY699633 | Blue Bridge, Haltwhistle; 68 and pedestrians |
