= George Hope =

George Hope may refer to:

- George Johnstone Hope (1767–1818), British naval officer
- George Hope (American football), head college football coach for the University of Richmond Spiders
- George Hope (Royal Navy officer) (1869–1959), Deputy First Sea Lord during World War I
- George Hope (footballer, born 1954), English footballer
- George Hope (Australian footballer) (1891–1964), Australian rules footballer
- George William Hope (1808–1863), British Member of Parliament for Windsor
