= Thirwall =

Thirlwall is a surname. Notable people with the surname include:

- Connop Thirlwall (1797–1875), English churchman
- Jade Thirlwall (born 1992), English singer
- Percival Thirlwall (fl. 15th-century), standard-bearer of Richard III
- Tony Thirlwall (1941–2023), British economist and academic

== See also ==
- Thirlwall Castle
