= John Langhorne =

John Langhorne may refer to:

- John Langhorne (poet) (1735–1779), English poet and prebendary
- John Langhorne (King's School Rochester) (1836–1911), master of Tonbridge School, headmaster of The King's School, Rochester and vicar of Lamberhurst
- John Bailey Langhorne (1816–1877), solicitor and proprietor of the Newcastle Chronicle
- John Watson's Institution § John Langhorne (1897–1925), Head Master at John Watson's Institution, Edinburgh, from 1897 to 1925 (born 1862, died 1925)
