= Blenkinsop Hall =

Country house in Northumberland, England

Coordinates: 54.97067°N 2.49859°W

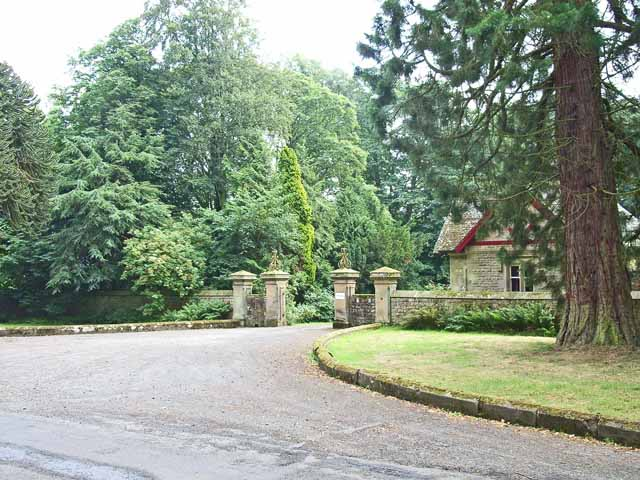
- Gateway to Blenkinsopp Hall

- Location within Northumberland
- Location: Northumberland, England
- OS grid reference: NY 68172 64130

Listed Building – Grade II
- Designated: 24 November 1967
- Reference no.: 1370312

Blenkinsop Hall (grid reference NY68186412) is a privately owned, castellated 19th-century country house situated on the banks of the Tipalt Burn near Greenhead, Northumberland. The legal address of the property is Haltwhistle, Northumberland, NE49 9LY. It is a Grade II listed building, reflecting its historical and architectural significance. The property is located near Blenkinsopp Castle, which is primarily a ruin; both the Hall and the castle were owned by the same family for several generations.

== History ==
The earliest recorded history of the Blenkinsop Hall area dates back to the Roman occupation, with remains of Hadrian's Wall visible to the north of the site. These remnants suggest the area's historical significance long before the construction of any structures on the land.

County records from the early 13th century, during the reign of Henry III of England, indicate that the land was held by Ralph Blenkinsop, though there is no evidence of a building on the site at that time. The first known structure, a house called Dryburnhaugh, appeared by the 17th century. It was associated with the Blenkinsop family, who were prominent landowners in the region and also owned the nearby Blenkinsop and Bellister castles. By 1663, John Blenkinsop was recorded as the owner of Dryburnhaugh, and the estate was later passed to Thomas Blenkinsop by 1712.

In 1727, the estate passed to the Coulson family when Jane Blenkinsop, the heiress, married William Coulson. Their son, Colonel John Blenkinsop Coulson, commissioned the construction of the current Blenkinsop Hall around 1800, a two-storey, five-bay house. The estate was further developed in the 1830s, when architect John Dobson was enlisted to make improvements. These included the addition of a south-east tower and stables, as well as alterations to the interior. The tower was later removed. A historic listing summary from 1967 indicates that by 1877, additional architectural features, such as parapets and a porch, were added, and the rear of the building was reconstructed.

In 1875, Edward Joicey acquired the Blenkinsop estates, including Blenkinsop Hall. Fiona Lees-Millais (née Joicey) and her husband became the owners in 2001, marking the final chapter of Joicey family ownership.

In 2020, after more than 145 years in the Joicey family's hands, the estate was put on the market for the first time since it was originally acquired in 1875. The property, comprising 11 houses and cottages, was listed for £4.85 million. The hall retained much of its original interior, including four reception rooms, ten bedrooms, four bathrooms, and a conservatory, while the yard featured two cottages, six stables, an office, and a game larder, as reported by Country Life magazine.

The property was sold in 2021 to the Silverwood family. The property remains listed as a Grade II listed building, reflecting its historical and architectural significance. According to The Journal, the new owners plan to operate the estate "traditionally, using rental income from its properties and agricultural land."

== See also ==
- Hadrian's Wall
- Stanegate

== Bibliography ==
- A History of Northumberland (1840) John Hodgson Pt 2 Vol 3 pp133–4
