= Blue Bridge =

Blue Bridge may refer to:

== Bridges ==
=== Canada ===
- Johnson Street Bridge in Victoria, British Columbia, Canada is often referred to as the Blue Bridge

=== Netherlands ===
- Blue bridge (Amsterdam), an historic bridge over the Amstel, Netherlands

=== Russia ===
- Blue Bridge (Saint Petersburg), the widest bridge in Saint Petersburg, Russia

=== United Kingdom ===
- Blue Bridge in Bow Creek Ecology Park, London
- Blue Bridge, Haltwhistle across the river South Tyne, Northumberland, United Kingdom
- Blue Bridge (Queensferry) across the River Dee in Flintshire, United Kingdom
- Blue Bridge (York), North Yorkshire, England
- Blue Bridge, Wolverton, Milton Keynes, England (1835) across the West Coast Main Line railway

=== United States ===
- Blue Bridge (Washington) across the Columbia River in Washington, U.S.
- Blue Bridge (Reed College) in Reed College, in Portland, Oregon, U.S.

== Settlements ==
- Blue Bridge, Milton Keynes in England
