= Sheriff Hill Lunatic Asylum =

Coordinates: 54.9377°N 1.5903°W

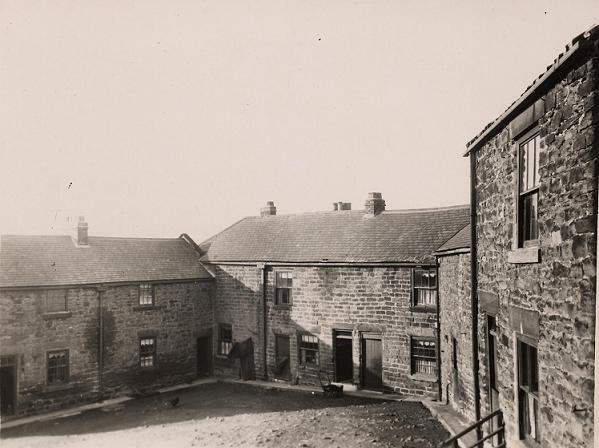
Sheriff Hill Lunatic Asylum

Sheriff Hill Lunatic Asylum (also known as Gateshead Fell Lunatic Asylum) was located at Sourmilk Hill in Sheriff Hill, Gateshead, Tyne and Wear. At that time Sourmilk Hill Lane continued across Church Road and onto what is today Larne Crescent, the asylum occupied the land on the corner of modern-day Larne Crescent and Church Road. It operated during the nineteenth century and provided isolation and medical care to hundreds of patients at a time when disease and illness in England were treated predominantly through isolation and asylum. At least two patients escaped from the institution, which closed around 1880.

== Conception and opening ==
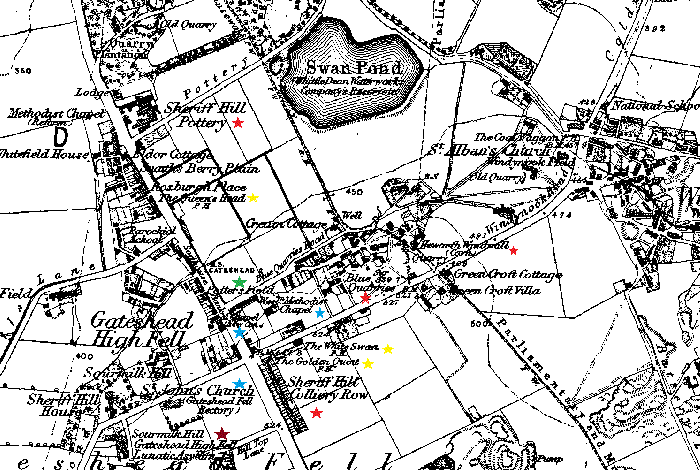
Ordnance Survey map of Sheriff Hill in 1862 showing the asylum

Sheriff Hill Lunatic Asylum was situated on Sour Milk Hill Lane, Sheriff Hill, during the nineteenth century. Wesleyan records circa 1830 note that "Sheriff Hill Lunatic Asylum is pleasantly situated on an ninence, about two-and-a-half miles south of Gateshead, from which a fine aspect of Ravensworth and its vicinity may be obtained". The old site of Sheriff Hill Asylum lies dormant today. Surviving archive photographs show that the asylum was designed in a rough square, with buildings on all four sides enclosing a courtyard. The exact date of opening remains the subject to debate. Contemporary sources indicate that the asylum opened in 1817, yet others note that when the asylum was advertised in 1834 the posting revealed that "this institution has been established for over thirty years".

== Ownership and Operation ==
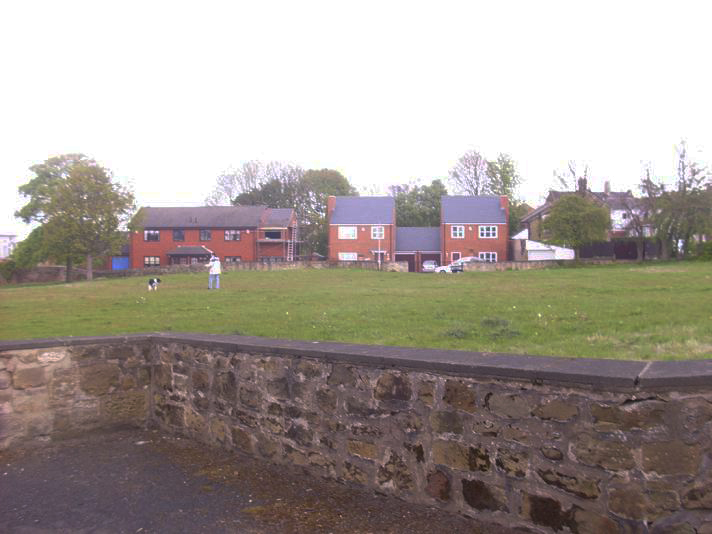
The site of the asylum

It is likely that the asylum was opened by a Mrs Orton and that at some stage soon after ownership was transferred to Jacob Gowling and his wife, who soon moved onto nearby Wrekenton to open a new asylum in a similar vein. In 1834, the asylum was in the hands of Samuel Kent, a wealthy local man who owned Beacon Lough Farm and who remained proprietor until the asylum was closed. According to the 1841 census there were 81 inmates at that time. In 1844, records show that the asylum had 86 patients. Of these, some eighty are recorded as being "pauper" whilst the other six are listed as "private". The weekly charge for the receipt and treatment of paupers was "8/- including clothes". In 1855, the asylum was contracted to receive paupers requiring treatment from neighbouring Newcastle. This increased the patient numbers to ninety-four, with eighty-eight paupers.

In 1817, Jonathan Martin, the brother of artist John Martin, was committed to the asylum after threatening to shoot the Bishop of Oxford. He escaped via the roof three years later. Another, more notorious incident occurred in December 1842:

An epileptic lunatic escaped from Mr. Kent's asylum at Gateshead Fell ... He was immediately pursued but was not retaken ... He escaped on Saturday night and on the Monday after his escape he murdered his wife and his daughter in a violent paroxysm of epileptic mania, in a most savage and horrid manner. This wretched man is now a furious criminal maniac...

== Closure ==
The exact date of closure is unknown. However, once the asylum closed, the buildings survived and were renamed to the less conspicuous "Kent's buildings" and the rather more so "Asylum Square". The buildings were to prove durable and as late as 1932, local historian D. Lumley wrote that "a great part of the building still remains". It is not known when the building was finally demolished, but the present site is derelict.

== Bibliography ==
- Carlton, Ian Clark (1974). A Short History of Gateshead. Gateshead Corporation. ISBN 0-901273-04-X.
- Manders, Francis William David (1973). A History of Gateshead. Gateshead Corporation. ISBN 0-901273-02-3.
- The Earl of Shaftesbury (1844). Report of the Metropolitan Commissioners in Lunacy to the Lord Chancellor. Bradbury and Evans.
- Unknown (13 June 1834). Classifieds.
