= Blenkinsopp Castle =

Castle in Northumberland, United Kingdom

- Northumberland, England
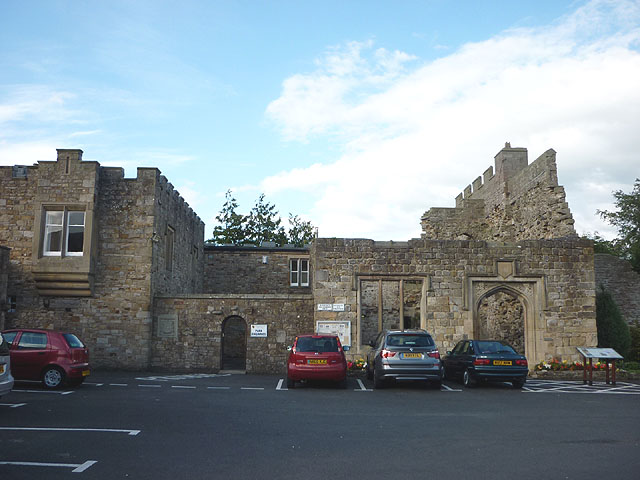
- Car park and ruins, Blenkinsopp Castle

Location
- Location in Northumberland
- Coordinates: 54.974°N 2.525°W
- Grid reference: NY665645

Blenkinsopp Castle (spelled Blenkinsop in many records) is a fire-damaged, partly demolished 19th-century country mansion, incorporating the ruinous remains of a 14th-century tower house, which is located above the Tipalt Burn approximately one mile south of Greenhead, Northumberland, England. It is a Grade II listed building; it is also a Scheduled Ancient Monument as one of the "surviving tower houses retaining significant medieval remains".

== Etymology ==
Blenkinsopp seems to originate in the early medieval Cumbric language, probably as blaen 'top' + kein 'back, ridge' (thus 'top of the ridge'). To this was later added the Old English element hōp 'valley'. However, other theories, stating that the name "Blenkinsopp" was derived from the village of Blencarn have been proposed.

== History ==
The ancient manor of Blenkinsopp was held by the Blenkinsopp family from the 13th century, and they created a substantial tower house. Some records indicate that it was built in 1339. A licence to crenellate the house was granted on 6 May 1340. It was being fortified to help protect the border.

County records from the reign of Henry III (1207–1272) state that the land where the castle would later be built was owned by Ralph Blenkinsop during that era; there was no indication of any buildings on the site at that time.

An early account by Wallis, writing prior to 1769 and quoted by Rev. J. F. Hodgson, found:

the west and north-west side of it protected by a very high cespititious (Note: 'Cespititious' in the above quote means 'turfy' or 'grass-covered', from the Latin 'caespes' meaning 'turf'.) wall and a deep foss – a vault going through it, north and south, 33 (Note: Hodgson copying corrects this to 53) feet in length, and in breadth 18½ feet: two lesser ones on the north side. The facing on the western wall has been down beyond the memory of any person yet living.

A survey of 1541 reported the roof to be in decay and the tower not to be in good repair. The family, whilst retaining ownership, granted possession to the Earl of Northumberland, and abandoned the castle for their other nearby properties to the east at Bellister Castle and Blenkinsop Hall.

In 1727, the heiress Jane Blenkinsopp married William Coulson of Jesmond. By 1832, the property was in disuse, and a mine agent's house was built adjoining the ruinous structure, probably by the architect John Dobson.

Between 1877 and 1880, William Lisle Blenkinsopp Coulson arranged for the castle to be renovated to a Victorian style. Shortly after these works, the Coulsons sold all their Blenkinsopp estates to Edward Joicey.

The historic listing summary provides some additional specifics about the property:

"House incorporating fragments of a medieval tower house. Licence to crenellate 1340; colliery agent's house added c.1832 (possibly by John Dobson); enlarged and largely rebuilt in Tudor style 1877-80 for William Lisle Blenkinsopp Coulson. First floor of 1880 entrance block removed in 1986. Dressed and squared stone incorporating some Roman material; roofs and chimneys of occupied west and north ranges are not visible; entrance block and agent's house now roofless ruins. Square-plan entrance block with agent's house set back on east and L-plan north range and house, with wall enclosing small yard, on west. Tudor style c.1880 details."

Edward Joicey purchased all the Blenkinsop estates in July 1875 and arranged for a restoration.

In the 20th century, the castle served as a hotel, but major damage was caused in 1954 by a fire, and large parts of the property were demolished on the grounds of safety.

In 1955 the castle was purchased by Charles Simpson and it featured in a British Pathé newsreel item in August 1956. In recent years, it has been part home and part ruin. In 2015, the property was listed for sale by Mike Simpson. The estate listing stated that "one wing survived and now houses the family home, which sits within a larger residential park - also containing luxury chalets and Blenkinsopp Castle Inn.". During the Simpson family's ownership, some renovations and restoration were completed, most recently in 2012 with some financial assistance from Historic England.

News items at the time reiterated folk lore indicating that the castle was haunted by the "White Lady", said to be "the widow of Bryan de Blenkinsopp because he left her when she refused to tell him where she had buried her treasure chest".

As of August 2020, the Inn, with rooms to let as well as a bistro and bar, was still operating in a separate section, not connected to the section that was a family home; the area containing the Inn had been the castle's coach stable.
