= William Martin (philosopher) =

English philosopher (1772 - 1851)

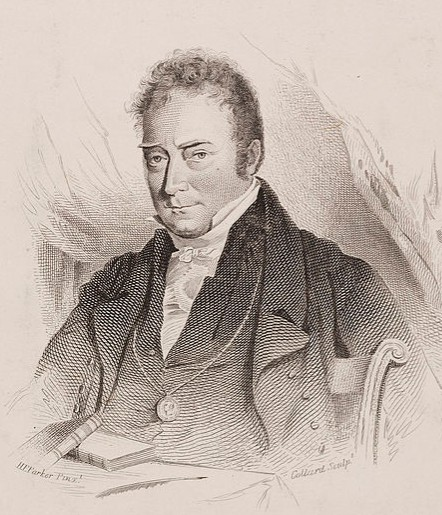
William Martin

William Martin (1772–1851) was an English eccentric and self-described natural philosopher.

== Life ==
Born on 21 June 1772, at the Towhouse in Haltwhistle, Northumberland, he was eldest son of Fenwick Martin and his wife Isabella Thompson; Jonathan Martin (1782–1838) and John Martin (1789–1854) the artist were brothers. He was brought up by his mother's parents, who in 1775 moved to Kintyre in western Scotland, to farm. On their deaths, he went to live with his father, then in business at Ayr.

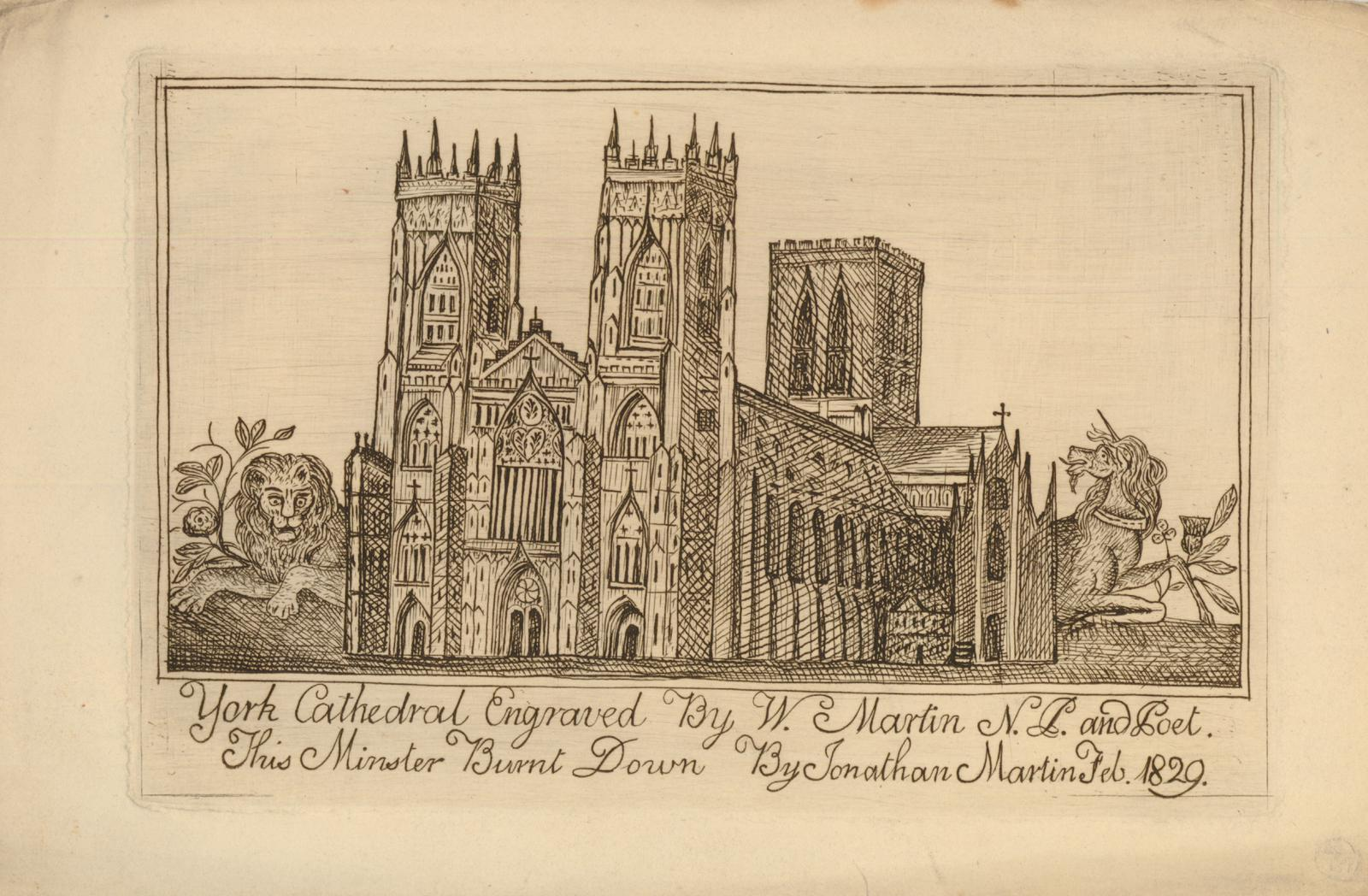
Etching of York Minster by William Martin, noting its arson by his brother, Jonathan Martin

In 1795 Martin joined the Northumberland regiment of militia, at Durham, and was discharged in 1805. With some mechanical talent he started to dabble in patents, selling one for a perpetual motion machine in 1808. In 1809 he returned to rope-making, a previous occupation, and in 1810 to the militia. In Ireland with his regiment, he worked at line engraving.

Martin in 1814 was presented with the Isis silver medal by the Society of Arts for the invention of a spring weighing machine, with circular dial and index. With marriage, at this period he became the representative "local character" and pamphleteer in Newcastle upon Tyne, the eccentric inventor documented at the end of the 19th century by Richard Welford.

The "Martinean Society" publicised by Martin opposed the Royal Society and the Newtonian theory of gravitation. He called himself "Anti-Newtonian" and lectured on his views in the Newcastle district. In 1830 he made an extended lecturing tour of England. In 1837 he exhibited in Newcastle a mail carriage to be propelled on rails by means of a winch and toothed wheel. He dressed oddly, sold his books and exhibited his inventions, which included models for a lifeboat and a lifebuoy, a miners' lamp, a self-acting railway gate, and a design for a high-level bridge over the River Tyne. John Bailey Langhorne described him as "perfectly cracked but harmless", and recalled how he used to wear his Society of Arts medal in public.

Martin's last years were passed at his brother John's house in Chelsea, London, where he died on 9 February 1851.

== Works ==
Martin's major printed works were all published at Newcastle:

- Harlequin's Invasion, a new Pantomine [sic] engraved and published by W. M., 1811.
- A New System of Natural Philosophy on the Principle of Perpetual Motion, with a Variety of other Useful Discoveries, 1821.
- A New Philosophical Song or Poem Book, called the Northumberland Bard, or the Downfall of all False Philosophy, 1827.
- W. M.'s Challenge to the whole Terrestrial Globe as a Philosopher and Critic, and Poet and Prophet, showing the Travels of his Mind, the quick Motion of the Soul, (verse) [1829]; 2nd edit. 1829.
- A Short Outline of the Philosopher's Life, from being a Child in Frocks to the Present Day, after the Defeat of all Impostors, False Philosophers, since the Creation. … The Burning of York Minster is not left out, and an Account of the Four Brothers and one Sister, 1833.
- The Christian Philosopher's Explanation of the General Deluge, and the Proper Cause of all the Different Strata, 1834.
- The Thunder Storm of Dreadful Forked Lightning; God's Judgement against all False Teachers. … Including an Account of the Railway Phenomenon, the Wonder of the World!, 1837.
- The Defeat of the Eighth Scientific Meeting of the British Association of Asses, which we may properly call the Rich Folks' Hopping, or the False Philosophers in an Uproar [1838].
- Light and Truth, M.'s Invention for Destroying all Foul Air and Fire Damps in Coal Pits, [proving also] the Scriptures to be right which learned Men are mystifying, and proving the Orang-outang or Monkey, the most unlikely thing under the Sun to be the Serpent that Beguiled our First Parents, 1838, 8vo.
- An Exposure of a New System of Irreligion … called the New Moral World, promulgated by R. Owen, Esq., whose Doctrine proves him a Child of the Devil, 1839.
- W. Martin, Christian Philosopher. The Exposure of Dr. Nichol, the Impostor and Mock Astronomer of Glasgow College [1839].
- W. Martin, Philosophical Conqueror of all Nations. Also a Challenge for all College Professors to prove this Wrong, and themselves Right, and that Air is not the first great Cause of all Things Animate and Inanimate, verse [1846].

== Family ==
In 1814 Martin married a dressmaker, who died 16 January 1832. She supported him, and they lived at Newcastle upon Tyne and then Wallsend.
