= Tipalt Burn =

River in Northumberland, England

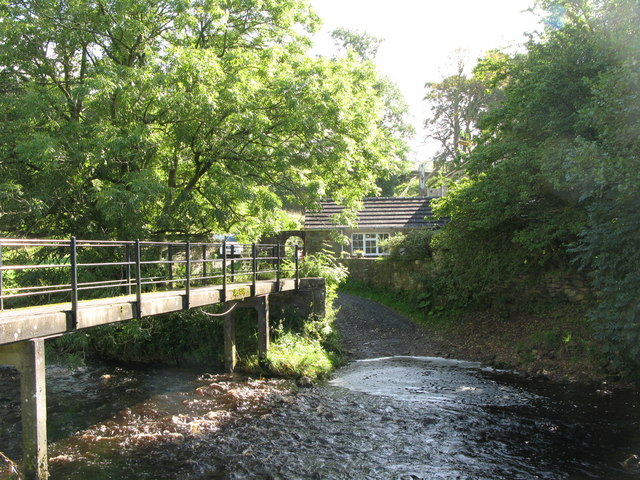
- Ford over the Tipalt Burn

- Location within Northumberland

Location
- Country: United Kingdom
- County: Northumberland

Physical characteristics
- Source
  - coordinates: 55.046634°N 2.440370°W
- Mouth
  - coordinates: 54.9623611°N 2.4723889°W
- Discharge
  - location: Haltwhistle

Tipalt Burn is a burn which lies to the east of Greenhead, Northumberland. The burn passes several historical sites such as Thirlwall Castle and discharges into the River South Tyne near the village of Haltwhistle. The burn is about 10 miles (16 km) in length and is located close to the north end of the Pennine Way.

== See also ==
- List of rivers of England
