= Plenmeller =

Village in Northumberland, England

Coordinates: 54.965°N 2.447°W

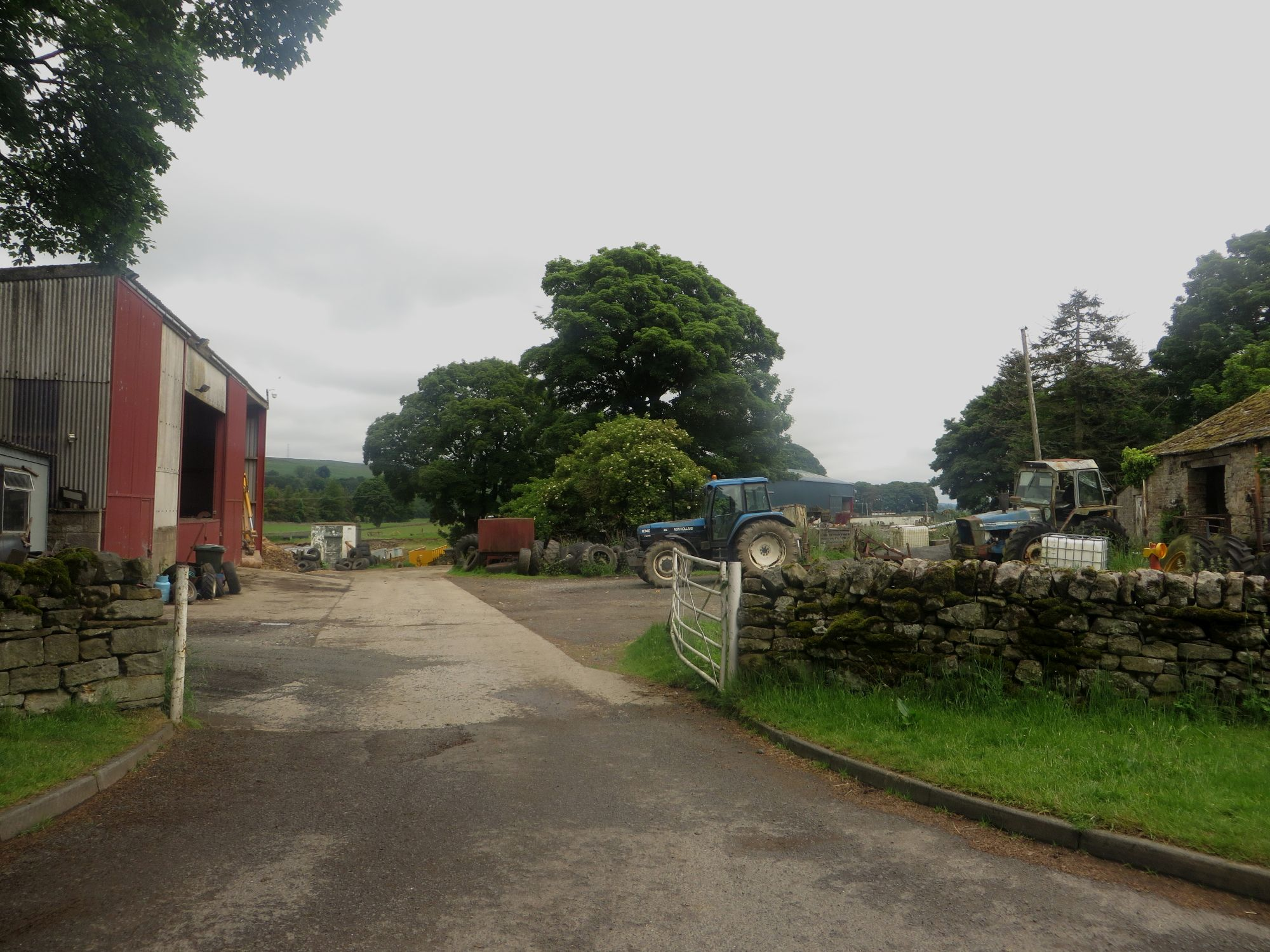
- East Plenmeller Farm

- Location within Northumberland
- Population: 98 (2011.Civil Parish)
- OS grid reference: NY715635
- Civil parish: Plenmeller with Whitefield
- Unitary authority: Northumberland
- Ceremonial county: Northumberland
- Region: North East
- Country: England
- Sovereign state: United Kingdom
- Post town: HALTWHISTLE
- Postcode district: NE49
- Police: Northumbria
- Fire: Northumberland
- Ambulance: North East
- UK Parliament: Hexham

Plenmeller is a village and former civil parish, now in the parish of Plenmeller with Whitfield, in Northumberland, England about a mile (1½ km) southeast of Haltwhistle. In 1951 the parish had a population of 107.

== Etymology ==
The name Plenmeller is first attested in 1255–56, with diverse spellings appearing: Plenmeneure, Plenmenewre, and Playnmalevere. The name is thought to come from the Brittonic language, comprising the words that in modern Welsh are blaen ("top"), moel ("bare"), and bre ("hill"). Thus the name once meant 'top of the bare hill'.

== Governance ==
Plenmeller is in the parliamentary constituency of Hexham. The parish council is Plenmeller with Whitfield. Historically, Plenmeller was a township, also incorporating Unthank, within the ancient parish of Haltwhistle. On 1 April 1955 the parish was abolished to form Plenmeller with Whitfield.

== Economy ==
Coal mining dominated the history of the area in recent times. Employment at Plenmeller colliery reached its peak in the early 1920s. When the colliery closed in 1932 it caused widespread hardship in the area. More recently coal has been extracted by open cast methods on Plenmeller Common and land then returned to a more natural landscape. The open cast mine was opened by John Northand CBE, Deputy Chairman of the British Coal Corporation, on 19 September 1991. By the time the site was completed in May 2002 there had been 1.91 million tonnes of coal extracted. RPC Containers Ltd., manufacturers of blow-moulded plastic containers, now operate from the site of the old colliery. There is a farm at the west side of the village.

== Landmarks ==
Unthank Hall is a Grade II listed mansion house, now serving as commercial offices, situated on the southern bank of the River South Tyne. The house, which was built in the 16th century, incorporating an ancient Pele tower, was substantially remodelled and extended in 1815. The Hall was later rebuilt between 1862 and 1865. Much of the 1865 house has since between demolished and only the central gables and entrance porch survive.

== Transport ==
=== Rail ===
Plenmeller Halt on the Alston line opened in 1919 to serve the colliery. The halt closed in 1946 and was demolished but trains continued to stop as required until the 1960s. The village is now served by Haltwhistle railway station on the Tyne Valley line. The line was opened in 1838, and links Newcastle with Carlisle. The line follows the course of the River Tyne through Northumberland.

Passenger services on the Tyne Valley Line are operated by Northern. The line is also heavily used for freight.

=== Road ===
The village lies just to the south of the A69 road as it bypasses Haltwhistle. The road is a major road running east–west across the Pennines, linking Newcastle upon Tyne with Carlisle in Cumbria.

== Etymology ==
It is generally agreed that the name "Plenmeller" is of Brythonic Celtic origin. The first element is most plausibly blajn meaning "summit" (cf. Welsh blaen). The second element is more obscure. Suffixes of -maɣl, "chief" and -mę:l, "bare" are both possible. The attestation Plenmeneure from 1256 would favour the suffix -maɣn, "a stone".

== See also ==
- Unthank Hall
