= Blue Bridge, Haltwhistle =

Blue Bridge
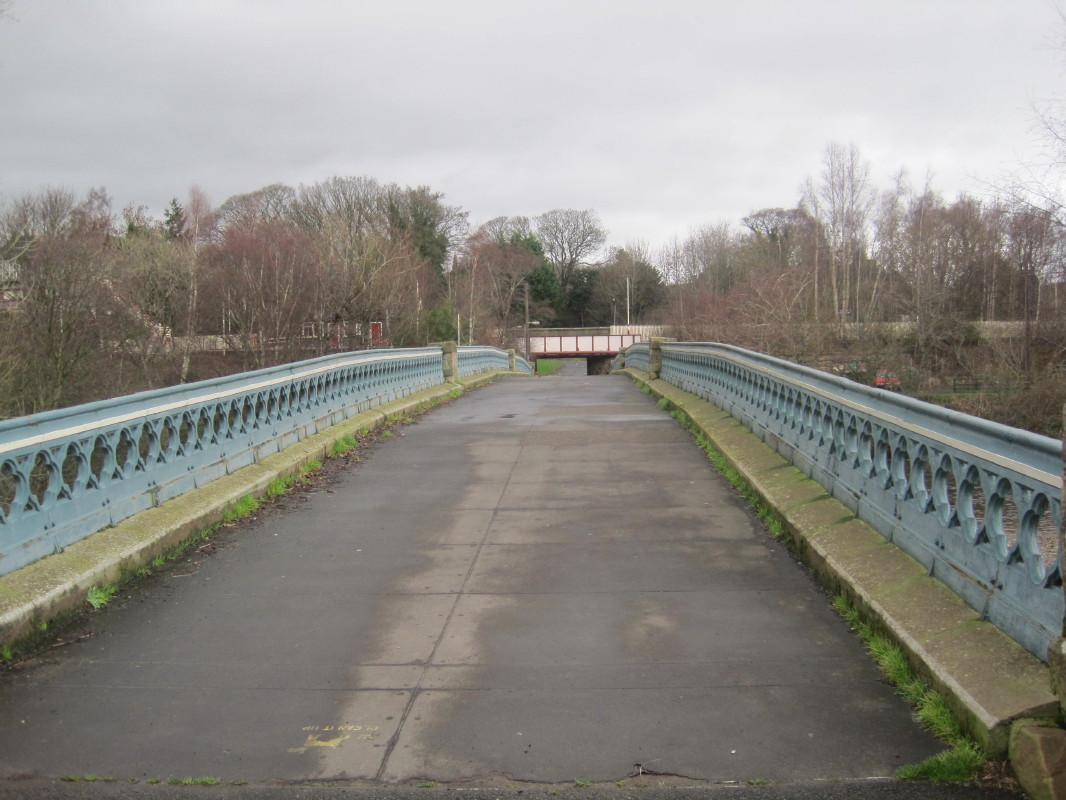
- Blue Bridge, Haltwhistle
- Coordinates: 54.9677°N 2.4617°W
- OS grid reference: NY705638
- Carries: 68; Pedestrians
- Crosses: River South Tyne
- Locale: Northumberland
- Official name: Haltwhistle Tyne Bridge
- Preceded by: Bellister Bridge
- Followed by: Alston Arches Viaduct

Characteristics
- Material: Wrought iron arches; Cast iron parapet
- Pier construction: Brick
- No. of spans: 3
- Piers in water: 2

History
- Designer: George Gordon Page
- Constructed by: Stansfield and Son
- Construction end: 1875
- Construction cost: £700
- Opened: 1875
- Closed: 1972 to motor vehicles

National Heritage List for England
- Type: Grade II listed building
- Designated: 27 July 1987
- Reference no.: 1370314

The Blue Bridge is an iron bridge across the River South Tyne at Haltwhistle in Northumberland, England.

== History ==
The Grade II listed bridge was designed by George Gordon Page: it has three arches and wooden decking and was completed in 1875. The bridge was closed to road traffic in 1972 and, having been refurbished in 2003, remains in use for pedestrians. It forms part of National Cycle Route 68, the Pennine Cycleway.

| Next bridge upstream | River South Tyne | Next bridge downstream |
| Bellister Bridge; Footbridge | Blue Bridge, Haltwhistle; Grid reference NY705638 | Alston Arches Viaduct; Footbridge |
