= Stuart Tiffin =

English cricketer

Michael Stuart Tiffin (born 7 June 1958) is an English cricketer. He was a right-handed batsman and wicket-keeper who played for Northumberland. He was born in Haltwhistle.

Tiffin made two List A appearances for the team, the first in 1989 and the second three seasons later, having represented the team in the Minor Counties Championship between 1987 and 1993. He made 49 not out in his first List A game against Surrey in 1989.

Tiffin appeared in the Northumberland County League First Division, and later the National Club Championship, for Ashington, between 1995 and 2001, and made two appearances in the Over-50s County Championship in June 2008.

Tiffin's son, also named Stuart, played for Northumberland in the Minor Counties Championship from 2006.
