= Arnold Walker (footballer) =

English footballer

Personal information
- Date of birth: 23 December 1932
- Place of birth: Haltwhistle, England
- Date of death: 25 December 2017 (aged 85)
- Place of death: Grimoldby, Lincolnshire, England
- Height: 5 ft 8 in (1.73 m)
- Position: Wing half

Senior career*
Years	Team	Apps	(Gls)
1948–1949	Ashby Juniors		
1949–1950	Appleby Frodingham		
1950–1958	Grimsby Town	65	(0)
1958–1960	Walsall	7	(0)
- * Club domestic league appearances and goals

Arnold Walker (23 December 1932 – 25 December 2017) was an English professional footballer who played as a wing half.
