= Unthank Hall =

House in Plenmeller, Northumberland, England

Coordinates: 54°57′40″N 2°25′25″W

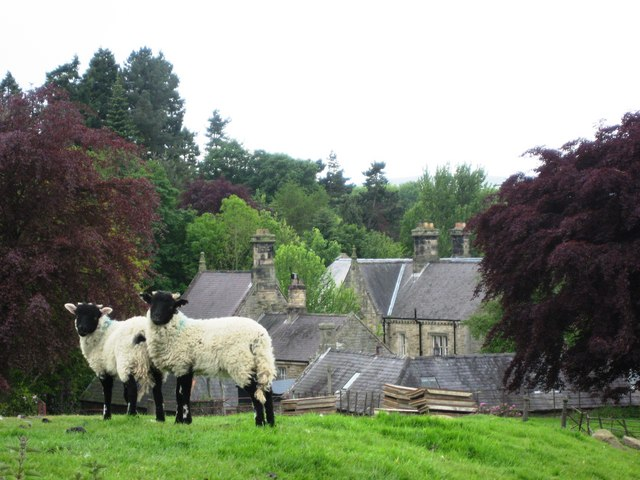
Unthank Hall

Unthank Hall is a Grade II listed property now serving as commercial offices, situated on the southern bank of the River South Tyne east of Plenmeller, near Haltwhistle, Northumberland.

In the 16th century the manor was owned by the Ridley family and it is possible that the bishop and martyr Nicholas Ridley was born there.

The house, which was built in the 16th century, incorporating an ancient pele tower, was substantially remodelled and extended in 1815.

The Hall came into the ownership of the Dixon family of Belford Hall, and then by marriage to the Browns. Dixon Brown (1776–1852) changed his name in 1825 to Dixon Dixon. The house was substantially remodelled in 1815.

His nephew Rev Dixon Dixon Brown [JP, DL, MA] (1826-1901) rebuilt the Hall between 1862 and 1865, in a neo-Tudor style, both times by Newcastle architect John Dobson. Dixon Dixon Brown was educated at Rugby and Exeter College, Oxford. He sold Unthank Hall in 1897.

Much of the 1865 house was demolished by further alterations in 1900, and a significant reduction in size was made in 1965.

== See also ==
- Hadrian's Wall
