= Old Town Hall, Haltwhistle =

Municipal building in Haltwhistle, Northumberland, England

Old Town Hall
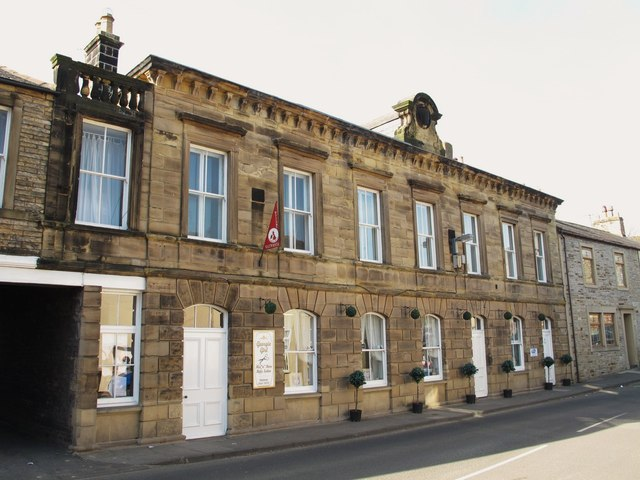
- The building in 2012

- Shown in Northumberland
- 54.9712°N 2.4569°W
- Location: Main Street, Haltwhistle

History
- Built: 1861

Site notes
- Architectural style: Neoclassical style

Listed Building – Grade II
- Official name: Georgie Girl Hair Salon (formerly the town hall)
- Designated: 26 July 1987
- Reference no.: 1370315

The Old Town Hall, also known as The Old Courthouse, is a former municipal building in Main Street, Haltwhistle, a town in Northumberland, England. The building, which is currently in use in part as a hair salon, and in part as commercial offices, is a Grade II listed building.

== History ==
Following significant population growth, largely associated with its status as a market town, parish leaders in Haltwhistle decided to commission a town hall. The site they selected was at the east end of the town on the north side of Main Street. The building was designed in the neoclassical style, built in ashlar stone and was completed in 1861. Internally, the principal rooms were a police station and a mechanics' institute on the ground floor, and an assembly room, capable of accommodating 350 people, on the first floor. There was also a library with approximately 1,000 books. The assembly room was used for concerts and theatrical performances, and was regularly used as the venue for the local petty sessions.

The architectural historian, Nikolaus Pevsner, was impressed with the design and described it as having "echoes of Vanbrugh", referring to the prominent architect, Sir John Vanbrugh.

By the mid-19th century, the building was no longer in municipal use but it continued to be used by the Northumberland County Constabulary. After the police relocated to new premises in Aesica Road in Haltwhistle, the old town hall was made available for commercial use and later served in part as a hair salon, and in part as commercial offices. It was grade II listed in 1987.

== Architecture ==
The two-storey building is constructed of sandstone, and has a slate roof. It is seven bays wide, and has a rusticated ground floor, with three four-panel doors with voussoirs, and three segmental headed sash windows also with voussoirs. The first floor is fenestrated by sash windows with architraves and window sills, above which there are heavy cornices. At roof level, there is a cornice supported by moulded stone brackets and a central segmentally-pedimented gablet, which formerly contained a clock.
