= Hexham Courant =

Weekly newspaper in Northumberland, England

- Type: Weekly newspaper
- Owner(s): Newsquest
- Founded: 1864
- Circulation: 5,797 (as of 2022)
- Website: https://www.hexham-courant.co.uk/

The Hexham Courant is a weekly newspaper serving Tynedale in Northumberland.

== History ==
The newspaper was first published in 1864. The full name of the newspaper is Hexham Courant incorporating Alston Herald, Hexham Herald, Haltwhistle Herald and Haltwhistle Echo, as shown on the final page of the newspaper (10 January 2014 edition).

On 23 February 2018, the Courant was sold in a takeover deal to the CN Group.
