= Percival Thirlwall =

15th century standard-bearer of Richard III

The Royal Standard of Richard III at the Battle of Bosworth.

Sir Percival Thirlwall was the standard-bearer of Richard III during the Battle of Bosworth Field, the penultimate battle in the Wars of the Roses which ultimately brought an end to the reign of the Plantagenets and inaugurated the Tudor dynasty.

Thirlwall fought alongside Richard during his final charge against Henry VII – which was considered to be the "swan song of medieval chivalry" – as he was his standard-bearer. He was slain after the intervention of Sir William Stanley and his force. Legend has it that, although Richard's group was failing, Sir Percival held the standard of his King aloft whilst fighting a desperate fight, continuing to do so even with the loss of his legs during combat; he is said to have held the standard until his last breath.

== Family ==
Sir Percival Thirlwall was of the Thirwall family, and so he would likely have lived in Thirlwall Castle, as his family had done so from around 1330 until 1748.

== Portrayal in the Ballad of Bosworth Fielde ==
This is how Sir Percivall Thirlwall was portrayed in the Ballad of Bosworth Fielde: "Sir Percivall Thriball, the other hight, & in his hart was true; King Richards’ standard hee kept upright until both his’ leggs’ were hewen him froe; to the ground he wold neuer let itt goe, whilest the breath his brest ws within; yet men pray ffor the knights’ that ever was soe true to their King."
