= List of electoral wards in Northumberland =

This is a list of electoral divisions and wards in the ceremonial county of Northumberland in North East England. All changes since the re-organisation of local government following the passing of the Local Government Act 1972 are shown. The number of councillors elected for each electoral division or ward is shown in brackets.

== County council ==
=== Northumberland ===
Electoral Divisions from 1 April 1974 (first election 12 April 1973) to 7 May 1981:

1. Allendale (1)
2. Alnwick (1)
3. Amble (1)
4. Ashington No. 1 (West) (1)
5. Ashington No. 2 (East) (1)
6. Ashington No. 3 (Central) (1)
7. Ashington No. 4 (South) (2)
8. Bamburgh (1)
9. Bedlingtonshire No. 1 (Bedlington) (2)
10. Bedlingtonshire No. 2 (Cambois) (1)
11. Bedlingtonshire No. 3 (Choppington) (2)
12. Bedlingtonshire No. 4 (Sleekburn) (1)
13. Bellingham (1)
14. Berwick upon Tweed No. 1 (North) (1)
15. Berwick upon Tweed No. 2 (South) (1)
16. Blyth No. 1 (Bebside) (1)
17. Blyth No. 2 (Croft) (1)
18. Blyth No. 3 (Plessey) (1)
19. Blyth No. 4 (Ridley & Seaton Sluice (2)
20. Blyth No. 5 (Waterloo) (2)
21. Bywell (1)
22. Castle Ward No. 1 (Belsay) (1)
23. Castle Ward No. 2 (Ponteland) (2)
24. Chatton (1)
25. Corbridge (1)
26. Crookham (1)
27. Embleton (1)
28. Haltwhistle (1)
29. Harbottle (1)
30. Hexham (East) (1)
31. Hexham (West) (1)
32. Humshaugh (1)
33. Islandshire (1)
34. Lesbury (1)
35. Longhirst (1)
36. Morpeth No. 1 (1)
37. Morpeth No. 2 (2)
38. Netherwitton (1)
39. Newbiggin-by-the-Sea No. 1 (East) (1)
40. Newbiggin-by-the-Sea No. 2 (West) (1)
41. Norhamshire (1)
42. Otterburn (1)
43. Plenmeller (1)
44. Prudhoe No. 1 (East) (1)
45. Prudhoe No. 2 (West) (1)
46. Rothbury (1)
47. Seaton Valley No. 1 (Cramlington) (3)
48. Seaton Valley No. 2 (Seaton Delavel (2)
49. Slaley (1)
50. Warkworth (1)
51. Widdrington (1)
52. Wooler (1)

Electoral Divisions from 7 May 1981 to 7 June 2001:

1. Allendale (1)
2. Alnwick (1)
3. Amble by the Sea (1)
4. Bamburgh (1)
5. Bedlington West (1)
6. Bellingham (1)
7. Berwick North (1)
8. Berwick South (1)
9. Blyth Valley Central (1)
10. Blyth Valley Cowpen (1)
11. Blyth Valley Cramlington East (1)
12. Blyth Valley Cramlington South East (1)
13. Blyth Valley Cramlington West (1)
14. Blyth Valley Croft (1)
15. Blyth Valley Hartley (1)
16. Blyth Valley Holywell (1)
17. Blyth Valley Isabella (1)
18. Blyth Valley Kitty Brewster (1)
19. Blyth Valley Parkside (1)
20. Blyth Valley Plessey (1)
21. Blyth Valley Seaton Delaval (1)
22. Blyth Valley Seghill (1)
23. Blyth Valley Wensleydale (1)
24. Bywell (1)
25. Corbridge (1)
26. Cramlington Village (1)
27. Crookham (1)
28. Embleton (1)
29. Haltwhistle (1)
30. Heddon on the Wall (1)
31. Hexham East (1)
32. Hexham West (1)
33. Humshaugh (1)
34. Lesbury (1)
35. Longhirst (1)
36. Lynemouth (1)
37. Morpeth North (1)
38. Morpeth South (1)
39. Morpeth Stobhill (1)
40. Netherwitton (1)
41. Newsham (1)
42. Norham & Islandshires (1)
43. Plenmeller (1)
44. Ponteland East (1)
45. Ponteland West (1)
46. Prudhoe East (1)
47. Prudhoe West (1)
48. Rothbury (1)
49. Shilbottle (1)
50. Slaley (1)
51. Stannington (1)
52. Wansbeck Ashington Central (1)
53. Wansbeck Bedlington Central (1)
54. Wansbeck Bedlington East (1)
55. Wansbeck Bothal (1)
56. Wansbeck Choppington (1)
57. Wansbeck Haydon (1)
58. Wansbeck Hirst (1)
59. Wansbeck Newbiggin East (1)
60. Wansbeck Newbiggin West (1)
61. Wansbeck Park & College (1)
62. Wansbeck Seaton (1)
63. Wansbeck Sleekburn (1)
64. Wansbeck Stakeford (1)
65. Widdrington (1)
66. Wooler (1)

Electoral Divisions from 7 June 2001 to 2 May 2013:

1. Alnwick (1)
2. Amble (1)
3. Amble West with Warkworth (1)
4. Ashington Central (1)
5. Bamburgh (1)
6. Bedlington Central (1)
7. Bedlington East (1)
8. Bedlington West (1)
9. Bellingham (1)
10. Berwick East (1)
11. Berwick North (1)
12. Berwick West with Ord (1)
13. Bothal (1)
14. Bywell (1)
15. Chevington with (1)
16. Choppington (1)
17. College (1)
18. Corbridge (1)
19. Cowpen (1)
20. Cramlington East (1)
21. Cramlington Eastfield (1)
22. Cramlington North (1)
23. Cramlington South East (1)
24. Cramlington Village (1)
25. Cramlington West (1)
26. Croft (1)
27. Haltwhistle (1)
28. Hartley (1)
29. Haydon & Hadrian (1)
30. Haydon (1)
31. Hexham Central with Acomb (1)
32. Hexham East (1)
33. Hexham West (1)
34. Hirst (1)
35. Holywell (1)
36. Humshaugh (1)
37. Isabella (1)
38. Kitty Brewster (1)
39. Lesbury (1)
40. Longhorseley (1)
41. Longhoughton (1)
42. Lynemouth (1)
43. Morpeth Kirkhill (1)
44. Morpeth North (1)
45. Morpeth Stobhill (1)
46. Newbiggin Central & East (1)
47. Newsham (1)
48. Norham & Islandshires (1)
49. Pegswood (1)
50. Plessey (1)
51. Ponteland East (1)
52. Ponteland North (1)
53. Ponteland South with Heddon (1)
54. Ponteland West (1)
55. Prudhoe East (1)
56. Prudhoe West (1)
57. Rothbury (1)
58. Seaton with Newbiggin West (1)
59. Seghill with Seaton Delaval (1)
60. Shilbottle (1)
61. Sleekburn (1)
62. South Blyth (1)
63. South Tynedale (1)
64. Stakeford (1)
65. Stocksfield & Broomhaugh (1)
66. Ulgham (1)
67. Wensleydale (1)
68. Wooler (1)

Electoral Divisions from 2 May 2013 to 1 May 2025:

1. Alnwick (2)
2. Amble (1)
3. Amble West with Warkworth (1)
4. Ashington Central (1)
5. Bamburgh (1)
6. Bedlington Central (1)
7. Bedlington East (1)
8. Bedlington West (1)
9. Bellingham (1)
10. Berwick East (1)
11. Berwick North (1)
12. Berwick West with Ord (1)
13. Bothal (1)
14. Bywell (1)
15. Choppington (1)
16. College (1)
17. Corbridge (1)
18. Cowpen (1)
19. Cramlington East (1)
20. Cramlington Eastfield (1)
21. Cramlington North (1)
22. Cramlington South East (1)
23. Cramlington Village (1)
24. Cramlington West (1)
25. Croft (1)
26. Druridge Bay (1)
27. Haltwhistle (1)
28. Hartley (1)
29. Haydon & Hadrian (1)
30. Haydon (1)
31. Hexham Central with Acomb (1)
32. Hexham East (1)
33. Hexham West (1)
34. Hirst (1)
35. Holywell (1)
36. Humshaugh (1)
37. Isabella (1)
38. Kitty Brewster (1)
39. Longhorsley (1)
40. Longhoughton (1)
41. Lynemouth (1)
42. Morpeth Kirkhill (1)
43. Morpeth North (1)
44. Morpeth Stobhill (1)
45. Newbiggin Central & East (1)
46. Newsham (1)
47. Norham & Islandshires (1)
48. Pegswood (1)
49. Plessey (1)
50. Ponteland East & Stannington (1)
51. Ponteland North (1)
52. Ponteland South with Heddon (1)
53. Ponteland West (1)
54. Prudhoe North (1)
55. Prudhoe South (1)
56. Rothbury (1)
57. Seaton with Newbiggin West (1)
58. Seghill with Seaton Delaval (1)
59. Shilbottle (1)
60. Sleekburn (1)
61. South Blyth (1)
62. South Tynedale (1)
63. Stakeford (1)
64. Stocksfield & Broomhaugh (1)
65. Wensleydale (1)
66. Wooler (1)

Electoral Divisions from 1 May 2025 to present:

1. Alnwick Castle (1)
2. Alnwick Hotspur (1)
3. Amble (1)
4. Amble West with Warkworth (1)
5. Ashington Central (1)
6. Bamburgh (1)
7. Bebside & Kitty Brewster (1)
8. Bedlington Central (1)
9. Bedlington East (1)
10. Bedlington West (1)
11. Bellingham (1)
12. Berwick East (1)
13. Berwick North (1)
14. Berwick West with Ord (1)
15. Bothal (1)
16. Choppington & Hepscott (1)
17. College with North Seaton (1)
18. Corbridge (1)
19. Cowpen (1)
20. Cramlington East & Double Row (1)
21. Cramlington Eastfield (1)
22. Cramlington North (1)
23. Cramlington North West (1)
24. Cramlington South East (1)
25. Cramlington South West (1)
26. Cramlington Village (1)
27. Croft (1)
28. Druridge Bay (1)
29. Haltwhistle (1)
30. Hartley (1)
31. Haydon (1)
32. Haydon & Hadrian (1)
33. Hexham East (1)
34. Hexham North (1)
35. Hexham West (1)
36. Hirst (1)
37. Holywell (1)
38. Humshaugh (1)
39. Isabella (1)
40. Longhirst (1)
41. Longhorsley (1)
42. Longhoughton (1)
43. Lynemouth (1)
44. Morpeth Kirkhill (1)
45. Morpeth North (1)
46. Morpeth Stobhill (1)
47. Newbiggin-by-the-Sea (1)
48. Newsham (1)
49. Norham & Islandshires (1)
50. Pegswood (1)
51. Plessey (1)
52. Ponteland East & Stannington (1)
53. Ponteland North (1)
54. Ponteland South with Heddon (1)
55. Ponteland West (1)
56. Prudhoe North & Wylam (1)
57. Prudhoe South (1)
58. Prudhoe West & Mickley (1)
59. Rothbury (1)
60. Seaton with Spital (1)
61. Seghill with Seaton Delaval (1)
62. Shilbottle (1)
63. Sleekburn (1)
64. South Blyth (1)
65. South Tynedale (1)
66. Stakeford (1)
67. Stocksfield & Bywell (1)
68. Wensleydale (1)
69. Wooler (1)

== Former district councils ==
=== Alnwick ===
Wards from 1 April 1974 (first election 7 June 1973) to 3 May 1979:

Wards from 3 May 1979 to 6 May 1999:

Wards from 6 May 1999 to 1 April 2009 (district abolished):

1. Alnmouth & Lesbury (2)
2. Alnwick Castle (3)
3. Alnwick Clayport (2)
4. Alnwick Hotspur (2)
5. Amble Central (2)
6. Amble East (2)
7. Amble West (2)
8. Embleton (1)
9. Harbottle & Elsdon (1)
10. Hedgeley (1)
11. Longframlington (1)
12. Longhoughton with Craster & Rennington (2)
13. Rothbury & South Rural (3)
14. Shilbottle (3)
15. Warkworth (2)
16. Whittingham (1)

=== Berwick-upon-Tweed ===
Wards from 1 April 1974 (first election 7 June 1973) to 6 May 1976:

Wards from 6 May 1976 to 6 May 1999:

Wards from 6 May 1999 to 1 April 2009 (district abolished):

1. Bamburgh (1)
2. Beadnell (1)
3. Belford (1)
4. Cheviot (1)
5. Edward (2)
6. Elizabeth (3)
7. Flodden (1)
8. Ford (1)
9. Islandshire (3) †
10. Lowick (1)
11. Norhamshire (2)
12. North Sunderland (2)
13. Prior (2)
14. Seton (2)
15. Shielfield (1) †
16. Spittal (3)
17. Wooler (2)

† minor boundary changes in 2008 ????

=== Blyth Valley ===
Wards from 1 April 1974 (first election 7 June 1973) to 3 May 1979:

Wards from 3 May 1979 to 2 May 1991:

Wards from 2 May 1991 to 6 May 1999:

1. Cowpen (3)
2. Cramlington East (3)
3. Cramlington South East (3)
4. Croft (3)
5. Eastfield (2)
6. Hartford & West Cramlington (3)
7. Hartley (3)
8. Holywell (2)
9. Isabella (3)
10. Kitty Brewster (2)
11. Newsham & New Delaval (3)
12. Parkside (3)
13. Plessey (3)
14. Seaton Delaval (2)
15. Seghill (1)
16. South Beach (3)
17. Village (3)
18. Wensleydale (2)

Wards from 6 May 1999 to 1 April 2009 (district abolished):

1. Cowpen (3)
2. Cramlington East (3)
3. Cramlington Eastfield with East Hartford (2)
4. Cramlington North (3)
5. Cramlington Parkside (2)
6. Cramlington South East (3)
7. Cramlington Village (3)
8. Cramlington West (2)
9. Croft (3)
10. Hartley (3)
11. Holywell (2)
12. Isabella (2)
13. Kitty Brewster (2)
14. Newsham & New Delaval (3)
15. Plessey (3
16. Seaton Delaval (3)
17. Seghill (2)
18. South Beach (2)
19. South Newsham (2)
20. Wensleydale (2)

=== Castle Morpeth ===
Wards from 1 April 1974 (first election 7 June 1973) to 6 May 1976:

Wards from 6 May 1976 to 6 May 1999:

Wards from 6 May 1999 to 3 May 2007:

1. Chevington (2)
2. Ellington (2)
3. Hartburn (1)
4. Hebron, Hepscott & Mitford (1)
5. Heddon-on-the-Wall (1)
6. Longhorsley (1)
7. Lynemouth (1)
8. Morpeth Central (2)
9. Morpeth Kirkhill (2)
10. Morpeth North (2)
11. Morpeth South (2)
12. Morpeth Stobhill (2)
13. Pegswood (2)
14. Ponteland East (2)
15. Ponteland North (2)
16. Ponteland South (2)
17. Ponteland West (2)
18. Stamfordham (1)
19. Stannington (1)
20. Ulgham (2)

Wards from 3 May 2007 to 1 April 2009 (district abolished):

1. Chevington (2)
2. Hartburn (1)
3. Heddon-on-the-Wall (1)
4. Longhorsley (1)
5. Lynemouth & Ellington (3)
6. Morpeth Kirkhill (2)
7. Morpeth North Central (3)
8. Morpeth South (2)
9. Morpeth Stobhill (2)
10. Pegswood & Hebron (3)
11. Ponteland East (2)
12. Ponteland North (2)
13. Ponteland South (2)
14. Ponteland West (2)
15. Stamfordham (1)
16. Stannington & Mitford (2)
17. Ulgham (2)

=== Tynedale ===
Wards from 1 April 1974 (first election 7 June 1973) to 6 May 1976:

Wards from 6 May 1976 to 6 May 1999:

Wards from 6 May 1999 to 1 April 2009 (district abolished):

1. Acomb (1)
2. Allendale (2)
3. Bellingham (1)
4. Broomhaugh & Riding (1)
5. Chollerton with Whittington (1)
6. Corbridge (3)
7. East Tynedale (1)
8. Hadrian (2)
9. Haltwhistle (3)
10. Haydon (2)
11. Hexham Gilesgate (1)
12. Hexham Hencotes (3)
13. Hexham Leazes (3)
14. Hexham Priestpopple (3)
15. Humshaugh & Wall (1)
16. Ovingham (1)
17. Prudhoe Castle (2)
18. Prudhoe North (2)
19. Prudhoe South (3)
20. Prudhoe West (2)
21. Redesdale (1)
22. Sandhoe with Dilston (1)
23. Slaley & Hexhamshire (1)
24. South Tynedale (1)
25. Stocksfield with Mickley (3)
26. Upper North Tyne (1)
27. Wanney (1)
28. Warden & Newbrough (1)
29. Wark (1)
30. West Tynedale (1)
31. Wylam (2)

=== Wansbeck ===
Wards from 1 April 1974 (first election 7 June 1973) to 6 May 1976:

Wards from 6 May 1976 to 6 May 1999:

Wards from 6 May 1999 to 3 May 2007:

1. Bedlington Central (3)
2. Bedlington East (3)
3. Bedlington West (3)
4. Bothal (3)
5. Central (3)
6. Choppington (2)
7. College (3)
8. Guide Post (3)
9. Haydon (3)
10. Hirst (3)
11. Newbiggin East (3)
12. Newbiggin West (2)
13. Park (3)
14. Seaton (3)
15. Sleekburn (3)
16. Stakeford (2)

Wards from 3 May 2007 to 1 April 2009 (district abolished):

1. Ashington Central (3)
2. Bedlington Central (3)
3. Bedlington East (3)
4. Bedlington North (2)
5. Bedlington South (2)
6. Bothal North (2)
7. Bothal South (2)
8. Choppington (2)
9. College (3)
10. Guide Post (3)
11. Haydon (3)
12. Hirst (2)
13. Newbiggin East (2)
14. Newbiggin West (2)
15. Park (3)
16. Seaton (3)
17. Sleekburn (3)
18. Stakeford (2)

== Electoral wards by constituency ==
Wards as they existed on 1 December 2020.

=== Blyth and Ashington ===
Ashington Central; Bedlington Central; Bedlington East; Bedlington West; Bothal; Choppington; College; Cowpen; Croft; Haydon; Hirst; Isabella; Kitty Brewster; Newbiggin Central & East; Newsham; Plessey; Seaton with Newbiggin West; Sleekburn; South Blyth; Stakeford; Wensleydale.

=== Cramlington and Killingworth (part) ===
Cramlington East; Cramlington Eastfield; Cramlington North; Cramlington South East; Cramlington Village; Cramlington West; Hartley; Holywell; Seghill with Seaton Delaval.

=== Hexham (part) ===
Bellingham; Bywell; Corbridge; Haltwhistle; Haydon & Hadrian; Hexham Central with Acomb; Hexham East; Hexham West; Humshaugh; Longhorsley; Ponteland East & Stannington; Ponteland North; Ponteland South with Heddon; Ponteland West; Prudhoe North; Prudhoe South; South Tyneside; Stocksfield & Broomhaugh.

=== North Northumberland ===
Alnwick; Amble; Amble West with Warkworth; Bamburgh; Berwick East; Berwick North; Berwick West with Ord; Druridge Bay; Longhoughton; Lynemouth; Morpeth Kirkhill; Morpeth North; Morpeth Stobhill; Norham & Islandshires; Pegswood; Rothbury; Shilbottle; Wooler.

== See also ==
- List of parliamentary constituencies in Northumberland
