= Haltwhistle =

Market town in Northumberland, England

Coordinates: 54.970°N 2.458°W

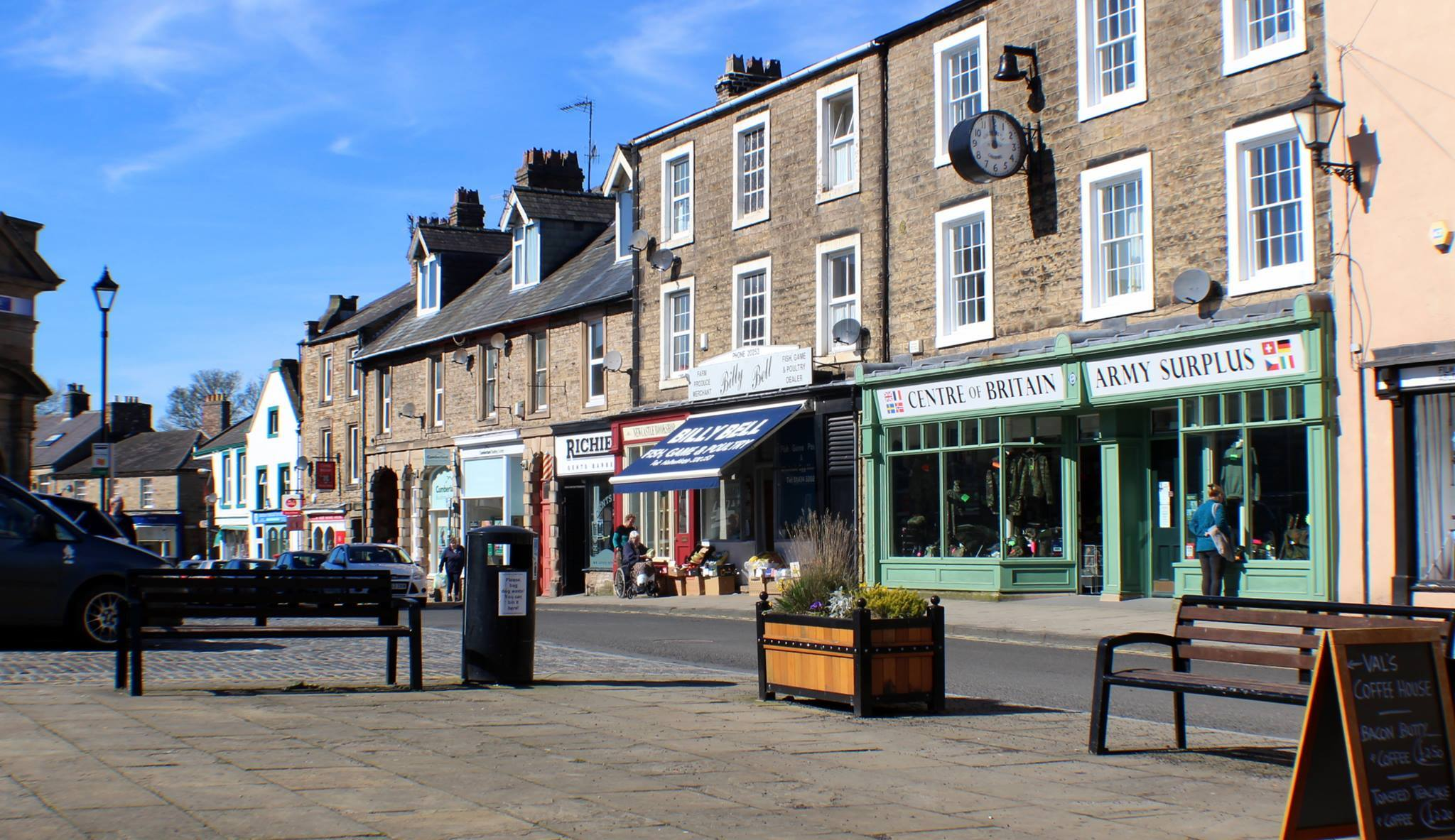
- Haltwhistle market place

- Location within Northumberland
- Population: 3,811 (2011)
- OS grid reference: NY706640
- Civil parish: Haltwhistle
- Unitary authority: Northumberland
- Ceremonial county: Northumberland
- Region: North East
- Country: England
- Sovereign state: United Kingdom
- Post town: HALTWHISTLE
- Postcode district: NE49
- Dialling code: 01434
- Police: Northumbria
- Fire: Northumberland
- Ambulance: North East
- UK Parliament: Hexham

Haltwhistle is a market town and civil parish in Northumberland, England, 23 miles (37 kilometres) east of Carlisle and 37 miles (60 kilometres) west of Newcastle upon Tyne. It had a population of 3,811 at the 2011 Census.

Haltwhistle is the closest community to Hadrian's Wall and to Northumberland National Park, both approximately 2 miles (3 kilometres) distant.

== The name ==
The name Haltwhistle has nothing to do with a railway stop. Early forms of the name are Hautwesel (1240), Hautwysel (1254), Hawtewysill (1279), Hautwysell (1381), Haltwesell (Speede 1610). The second part -twistle relates to two streams or rivers. It derives from two Old English words twicce or twise, 'twice', 'division into two' and wella, 'stream, brook'. The second word is reduced in the compound word to ull, making twicculla, twisella. All but one of the examples in place names represent a high tongue of land between two streams where they join.

The first part is probably derived from Old English hēafod, here 'hill-top', in general, 'head', 'headland', 'summit', 'upper end' or 'source of a stream'. If so, it describes the hill-top on which Holy Cross Church and the oldest part of Haltwhistle was built, enclosed on the north-east and west by Haltwhistle Burn and on the south by the South Tyne. Rowland suggests Hal from 'hill' A suggestion is French haut-, meaning 'high', since the settlement already existed long before the Norman Conquest.

A Town web site suggests that Haltwhistle signifies either "the high hill by two rivers" or "the watch on high".

== History ==
Haltwhistle was probably in existence in Roman times, as it is one of the closest approaches of the River South Tyne in its upland reaches to Hadrian's Wall. The old Roman road known as the Stanegate, which is thought to predate Hadrian’s Wall by some forty years or so, passes just two miles (three kilometres) to the north of the town.

The town web site summarizes an important part of the history (late Middle Ages) of the community as: "for many centuries, the constant marauding of English and Scots caused turmoil in Haltwhistle and throughout the Borders". In 1598, "the infamous Armstrongs of Liddesdale fired and plundered Haltwhistle". Another important raid on Haltwhistle was made in 1601 by the Scots "who carried away prisoners and all their goods"; they were later reclaimed by a raid on Liddesdale. Scots, particularly the Armstrongs, later returned and burned many houses; that led to "years of feuds between the Armstrongs and the Ridley's of Haltwhistle".

Celia Fiennes did not entirely enjoy her visit in the 1690s:

"This Hartwhistle is a Little town, there was one Inn but they had noe hay nor would get none, and when my servants had got some Else where they were angry and would not Entertaine me, so I was forced to take up in a poor Cottage wch was open to ye Thatch and no partitions but hurdles plaistered. Indeed ye Loft as they Called it wch was over the other roomes was shelter'd but wth a hurdle; here I was fforced to take up my abode and ye Landlady brought me out her best sheetes wch serv'd to secure my own sheetes from her dirty blanckets, and Indeed I had her fine sheete to spread over ye top of the Clothes; but noe sleepe Could I get, they burning turff and their Chimneys are sort of fflews or open tunnills, yt ye smoake does annoy the roomes. This is but 12 miles [19 km] from another part of Scotland, the houses are but a Little better built, its true the inside of them are kept a Little better."

Dorothy, Lady Capell, endowed a school in Haltwhistle in her will of 1721.

The development of the town benefited from its location on the main Newcastle to Carlisle road and on the Newcastle and Carlisle Railway line.

The expansion of Haltwhistle in the 18th and 19th centuries was due to coal mining in the area and to a lesser extent the use of Haltwhistle as a loading point for metal ores coming from the mines on Alston Moor to the south. In 1836 while some workmen were quarrying stone for the Directors of the Newcastle and Carlisle Railway, on the top of Barcombe, a high hill in the township of Thorngrafton and Parish of Haltwhistle, one of them found a copper vessel containing 63 coins, 3 of them gold and 60 copper. The gold coins were, one of Claudius Caesar, reverse Nero Claudius Drusus Germanicus; one of Nero and one of Vespasian. The find is known as the Thorngrafton Hoard and the empty arm-purse can still be seen in the museum at Chesters Fort.

More recently, paint manufacture became a major commercial force in the town, but has now stopped major production. Current local employers include factories making plastic bottles and de-icing products.

In the 21st century, the tourist industry dominates the economy with Hadrian's Wall and walking and rambling counting among the principal interests of tourists. The Town web site summarizes the appeal of the area which is "within easy reach of Newcastle and Carlisle".

Skirted by the Northumberland National Park and the North Pennines range, Haltwhistle is ideal for activity and family holidays, walking, cycling, fishing and climbing. Close to where the North & South Tynes meet, with many pretty villages dotted along both river valleys...

== Early economy ==
Haltwhistle was a market town for the exchange of local goods. In the 18th century two Quakers set up a baize manufactury and there was a weaving establishment. On the Haltwhistle Burn were fulling mills, dyeing and spinning mills. A walk along this stream to the Roman Wall, shows that it must have been a hive of industry with quarries, coal mining and lime burning kilns. The Directory of 1822 (Pigot) gives a whole range of craftsmen, shopkeepers and traders; 60 in number, including makers of clogs. The weekly market was held on Thursdays and there were fairs on 14 May and 22 November for cattle and sheep.

== Landmarks ==
Hadrian's Wall to the north of the town is used as a major selling point for the town. The section of the wall closest to Haltwhistle is among the most spectacular and complete, with the wall striding eastwards from the lake at Crag Lough along the spine of the Whin Sill.

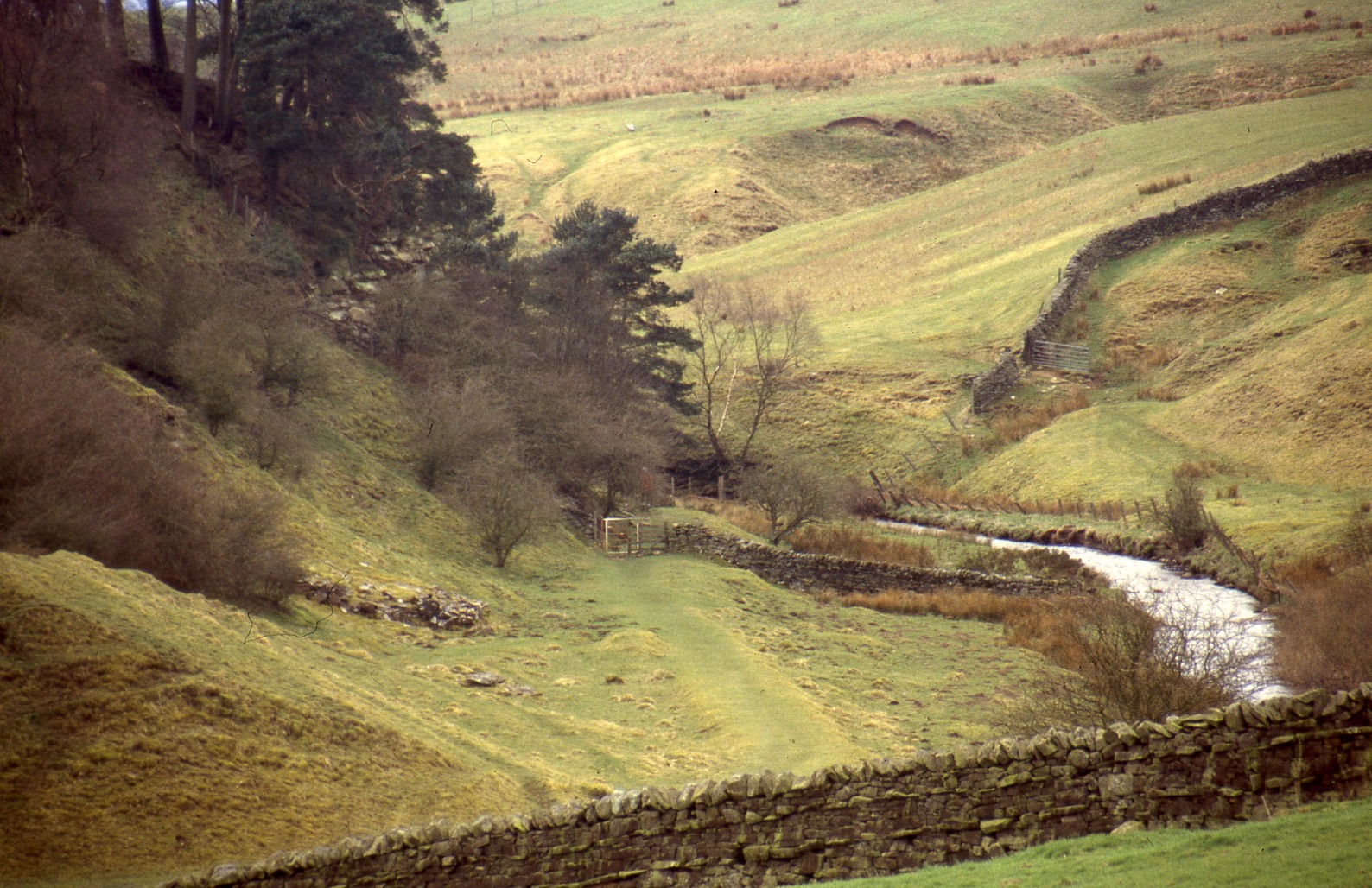
Haltwhistle Burn between the town and Hadrian's wall

The remains of Haltwhistle Castle and the series of Bastles, and Haltwhistle Tower. Haltwhistle also claims to be at the geographic centre of Britain – equidistant from the sea as measured along the principal points of the compass. A hotel in the centre of Haltwhistle is named the Centre of Britain Hotel in recognition of this claim. The claim is rather tenuous as it requires that the northern extremity is taken to be Orkney rather than Shetland. Depending on how the centre of the island is calculated, however, the centre can be said to be Dunsop Bridge in Lancashire. See centre points of the United Kingdom.

A Border reivers' Peel Tower, circa 15th century, is now part of the Centre of Britain hotel and the town contains five Bastle houses (fortified farm houses). Roughly three miles distant from the town centre are Blenkinsop Hall and Blenkinsopp Castle, both Grade II listed buildings. The Grade I listed Thirlwall Castle is located four miles from Haltwhistle.

Other historic properties nearby include Featherstone Castle, Unthank Hall, Bellister Castle and Coanwood Friends Meeting House.

Haltwhistle Viaduct lies to the south of the railway station and was the first major feature on the Alston Line to Alston, Cumbria.

=== Other features ===
Stone-built houses are a feature of Haltwhistle. It is one of two settlements in Great Britain which claim to be the exact geographic centre of the island, along with Dunsop Bridge in Lancashire, 71 miles (114 km) to the south.

== Religious sites ==
The Church of the Holy Cross is situated below the Market Place, with views over the river and the valley. This is a Grade II listed building said to be "one of only a few early 13th century churches still functioning as a working church in England". One of the tombs is that of crusader Thomas de Blenkinsopp who died in 1388. There are a number of other medieval grave covers to the Blenkinsopps and the Thirlwells.

It is a good example of a North Country church, impressive considering the time when it was built in the thirteenth century. The chancel measures 46 by 20 feet (14.0 by 6.1 m), with lancet windows – combined three lights in the east end and four single lights on each side, the walls being supported by buttresses. Inside is a piscina (for washing) and three sedilia (seats for the clergy). The nave measures 63 by 46 feet (19 by 14 m) and has side aisles above which are clerestory windows. It has four bays with round columns and pointed arches, looking very spacious inside. The font, dated 1676, has some curious crude carvings on it, and there is another large circular bowl on a shaft, which is probably an earlier font. At the west end it has long lancet windows and a bell-cote, again typical of the North country.

Nearby, the village of Coanwood houses a small but historic chapel, designated as Grade II* by English Heritage. The summary states: "...dated 1760 on lintel. Squared stone with rusticated quoins and dressings". Coanwood Friends Meeting House was a Quaker place of worship and is maintained to this day as a historical site open to visitors.

== Governance ==
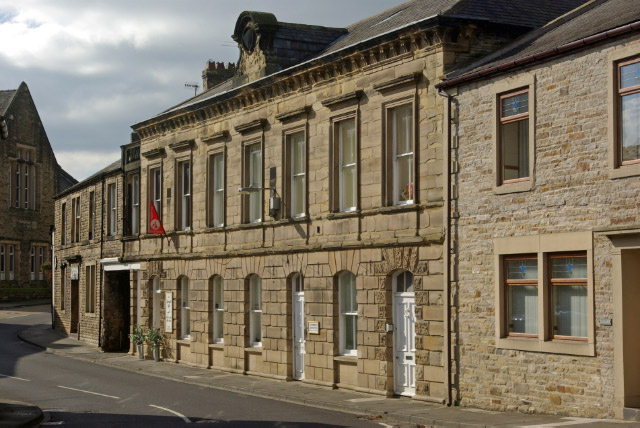
The Old Town Hall

Haltwhistle is currently in the parliamentary constituency of Hexham; Joe Morris of the Labour Party is the Member of Parliament.

For Local Government purposes it belongs to Northumberland County Council a unitary authority, with Haltwhistle lying in the Tynedale Division. Prior to the 2009 structural changes to local government in England it was part of Tynedale Council. Prior to the 1974 great reorganisation, it belonged to the county of Northumberland. The Old Town Hall in Haltwhistle is now used as a hair salon.

An electoral ward with the same name still exists. This ward stretches from Hexham south up the River Tyne South and has a total population taken at the 2011 Census of 4,832.

== Media ==
Local news and television programmes are provided by BBC North East and Cumbria and ITV Border.

Local radio stations are BBC Radio Newcastle, Capital North East, Heart North East and Hits Radio North East.

The town's local newspaper is the Hexham Courant.

== Transport ==
Railway

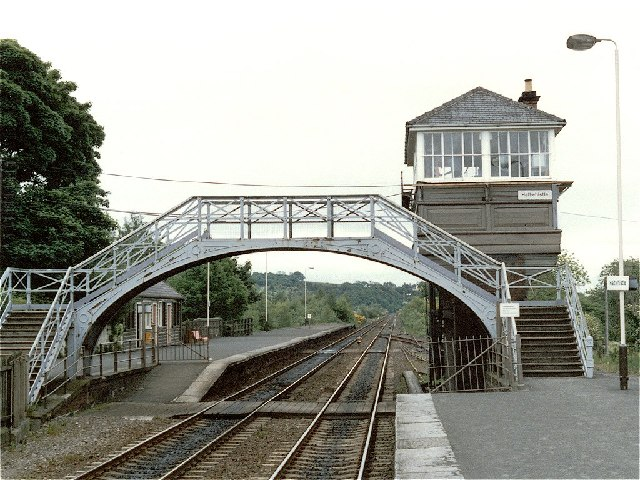
Haltwhistle railway station

The town is served by Haltwhistle railway station on the Newcastle and Carlisle Railway, also known as the Tyne Valley Line. The line was opened in 1838, and links the city of Newcastle upon Tyne in Tyne and Wear with Carlisle in Cumbria. The line follows the course of the River Tyne through Northumberland.

Passenger services on the Tyne Valley Railway are operated by Northern and ScotRail. The line is also heavily used for freight. The railway station is on the south side of the town, close by the River South Tyne.

Until 1976, the railway station was also the junction of the branch line to Alston, in Cumbria, which was 13 miles (21 km) in length. Part of the southern section of the Haltwhistle to Alston line has been reopened as a 2 ft (610 mm) narrow gauge railway, known as the South Tynedale Railway, between Alston and Slaggyford. The trust that owns and operates the railway intends to reopen the entire branch line from Alston to Haltwhistle.

Road

The A69 trunk road, which links Carlisle and Newcastle upon Tyne, formerly passed south of the town centre and through its western outskirts, until a full bypass was opened in 1997.

== Notable people ==
- Paul Boertien (born 1979), footballer
- William D. Clark (1916–1985), economist, public servant, former Downing Street Press Secretary
- William Lisle Blenkinsopp Coulson (1840–1911), army officer, lecturer, writer, animal welfare advocate
- Shaun Elliott (born 1957), footballer
- Steve Elliott (born 1958), footballer
- George Hope (born 1954), footballer
- James Hope (1807–1854), soldier, landowner, politician, MP of Linlithgowshire
- Christopher Magnay (1767-1826), merchant, politician, Lord Mayor of London
- William Martin (1772–1851), philosopher, eccentric, militia officer, inventor
- George Pattinson (1854–1931), Canadian industrialist, politician, MPP of Waterloo South
- Ada Smith (1875–1898), poet
- Olive Smith (1880–1916), masseuse, physical training instructor, SWH veteran
- Spike (born 1966), musician, lead singer of The Quireboys
- Stuart Tiffin (born 1958), cricketer
- Arnold Walker (1932–2017), footballer
