= Greenhead, Northumberland =

Village in Northumberland, England

Coordinates: 54.983°N 2.523°W

Greenhead
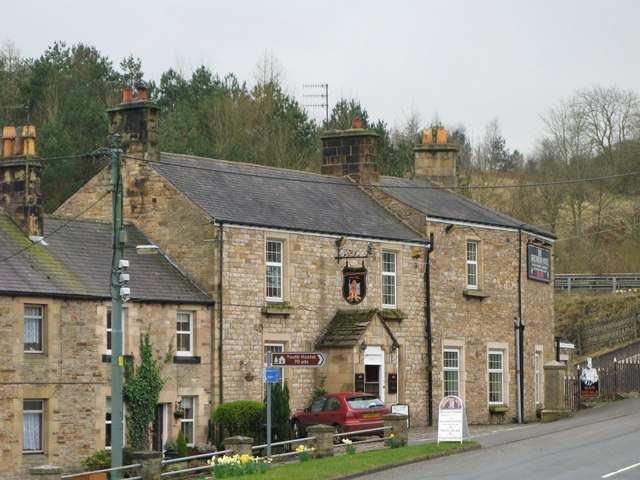
- The Greenhead Hotel

- Location within Northumberland
- Population: 385 (2011)
- OS grid reference: NY665655
- Civil parish: Greenhead
- Shire county: Northumberland
- Region: North East
- Country: England
- Sovereign state: United Kingdom
- Post town: BRAMPTON
- Postcode district: CA8
- Dialling code: 016977
- Police: Northumbria
- Fire: Northumberland
- Ambulance: North East
- UK Parliament: Hexham

Greenhead is a village and civil parish in Northumberland, England. The village is on the Military Road (B6318), about 17 miles (27 km) from Chollerford, 3 miles (5 km) from Haltwhistle and 9 miles (14 km) from Brampton, Cumbria along the A69 road. The A69 bypasses the village, but until the 1980s all vehicular traffic passed through it. The village lies just outside the Northumberland National Park, close to Hadrian's Wall. Just to the north of the village is the 12th-century Thirlwall Castle, recently restored and opened to the public. Nearby villages include Upper Denton and Haltwhistle.

A former Methodist chapel in the village is now a youth hostel.

The Pennine Way, the UK's first National Trail, passes through Greenhead.

== Governance ==
Greenhead is in the parliamentary constituency of Hexham. The local authority is Northumberland County Council, a unitary authority.

== Landmarks ==
Thirlwall Castle (grid reference NY65946615) is a 12th-century castle on the bank of the Tipalt Burn close to the village of Greenhead and approximately 20 miles (32 km) west of Hexham. It was built in the 12th century, and later strengthened using stones from nearby Hadrian's Wall, but began to fall into disrepair in the 17th century. The site is protected by Grade I listed building and Scheduled Ancient Monument status.

== Transport ==
The village was served by Greenhead railway station on the Newcastle and Carlisle Railway, also known as the Tyne Valley Line. The line was opened in 1838, and links the city of Newcastle upon Tyne in Tyne and Wear with Carlisle in Cumbria. The line follows the course of the River Tyne through Northumberland. The station opened on 19 July 1836, when the section from Carlisle London Road to Greenhead opened, and closed in 1967. The nearest open station is at Haltwhistle (3 miles).

== See also ==
- Hostel
- Border Counties Railway
