= George Hope (footballer, born 1954) =

English footballer

Personal information
- Date of birth: 4 April 1954 (age 72)
- Place of birth: Haltwhistle, England
- Position: Forward

Senior career*
Years	Team	Apps	(Gls)
1973–1974	Newcastle United	6	(1)
1975–1977	Charlton Athletic	13	(2)
1977–1978	York City	42	(8)
1980–1982	Wezel Sport	?	(?)
Total		61	(11)
- * Club domestic league appearances and goals

George Hope (born 4 March 1954 in Haltwhistle, Northumberland, England), is an English footballer who played as a forward in the Football League.
