= George Hope (Australian footballer) =

Australian rules footballer

Personal information
- Full name: George Hope
- Born: 12 September 1891
- Died: 13 October 1964 (aged 73)

Playing career^{1}
Years	Club	Games (Goals)
1917–19	Geelong	21 (0)
- ^{1} Playing statistics correct to the end of 1919.

George Hope (12 September 1891 – 13 October 1964) was an Australian rules footballer who played with Geelong in the Victorian Football League (VFL).
