= Jonathan Martin (arsonist) =

English arsonist

Jonathan Martin (1782 – 27 May 1838) was an English arsonist, famous for setting fire to York Minster in 1829.

== Early life ==
Martin was born at Highside House, near Hexham in Northumberland, one of the twelve children of William Fenwick Martin and Isabella, née Thompson. Among his siblings was the artist John Martin and the philosopher William Martin. Jonathan was tongue tied and spoke with an impediment. He was brought up by his aunt, Ann Thompson, a staunch Protestant with a vivid image of hell.

After he witnessed the murder of his sister by a neighbour, he was sent to his uncle's farm to recover from the shock. He was apprenticed to a tanner but was press ganged in London in 1804. He served in the Royal Navy ship HMS Hercule for six years, including the Battle of Copenhagen in 1807. He was noted among his shipmates for his religious obsession.

He left the Navy when his ship was broken up in 1810, returning to Norton, County Durham, where he married, and his son Richard was born in 1814. After his parents died, he became a Wesleyan preacher in 1814, strongly denouncing the Church of England. He gained a reputation for disrupting church services.

After threatening to shoot the Bishop of Oxford, Edward Legge at a confirmation service in Stockton in 1817, he was arrested, tried, and was sent to a private lunatic asylum in West Auckland. He was later moved to the public asylum in Gateshead. He escaped in June 1820, but was soon recaptured.

His wife died of breast cancer in 1821, and he escaped from the asylum for a second time, returning to work as a tanner and preacher. The Wesleyan Church refused to take him back, and he was turned away by the Primitive Methodists. He published his autobiography at Lincoln in 1826, with further editions published in 1828, 1829 and 1830, and he made a living by selling his book.

== Arson ==
He remarried in Boston, Lincolnshire in 1828, to Maria Hudson, and the couple moved to York.

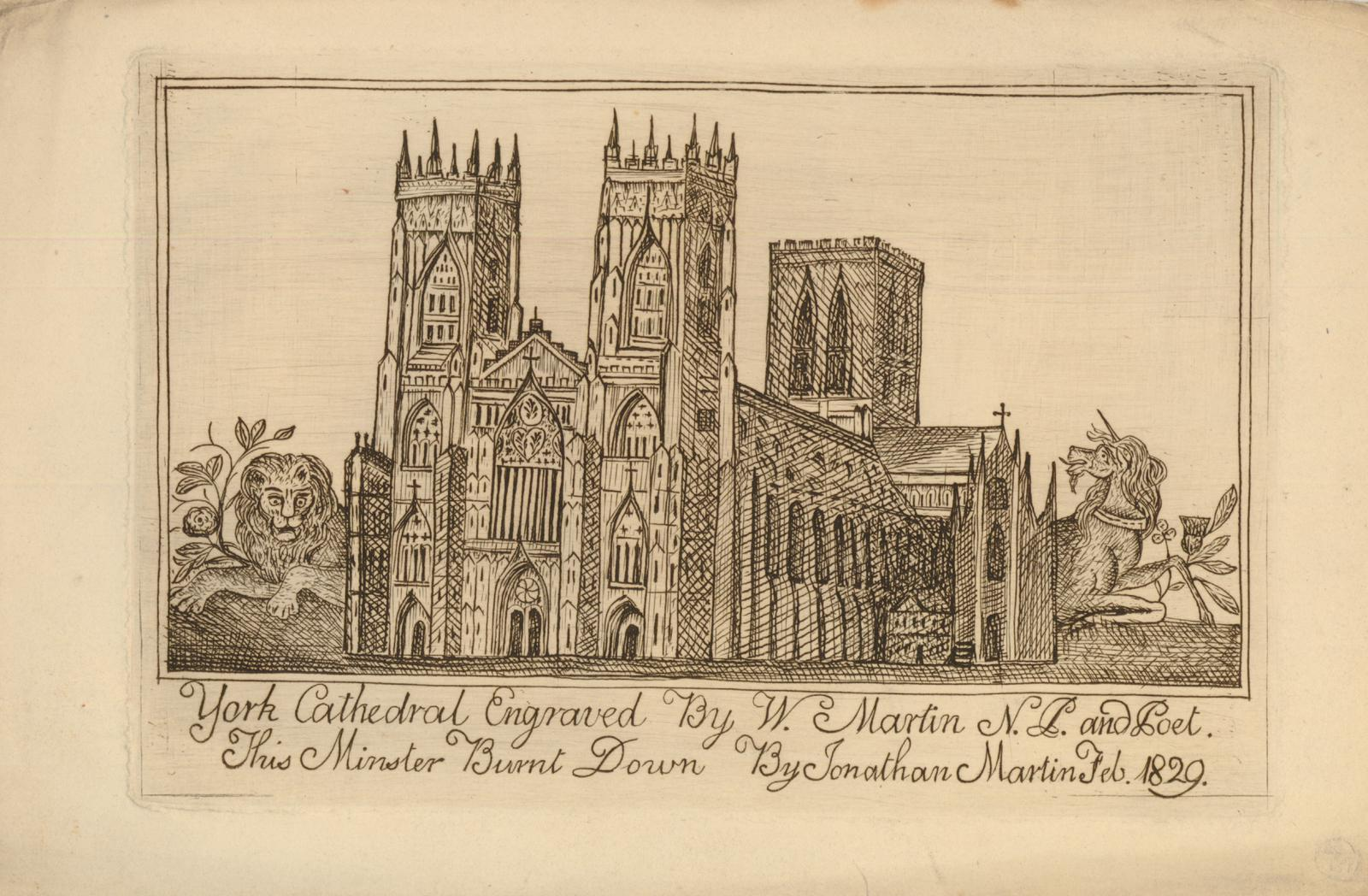
Etching of York Minster by William Martin, Jonathan's brother

A year later, Martin had another mental breakdown. On Sunday 1 February 1829, he became upset by a buzzing sound in the organ while attending evensong at York Minster. He hid in the building, and then lit a lamp in the belltower. The cathedral watchman had been discharged, and the light was ignored by anyone who saw it. Later that night, he set fire to the woodwork in the choir before escaping through a window. Smoke was seen coming out of the building at 7am on 2 February, and the fire was raging through the organ and choir by 8am. The fire was brought under control that afternoon and extinguished on 3 February, when the extent of the damage became apparent. A section of the roof of the central aisle approximately 131 foot (40 m) long was destroyed, stretching from the lantern tower towards the east window, together with much of the internal woodwork from the organ screen to the altar screen, including the organ, medieval choir stalls, the bishop's throne, and the pulpit. The cause – arson – soon became apparent, and the culprit was identified from threatening placards Martin had left on the Minster railings in previous days, including his initials and address.

Martin was captured near Hexham on 6 February. He was tried at York Castle in March 1829, before Baron Hullock and a jury. The case was a national cause célèbre, coming only two months after the trials of Burke and Hare in Edinburgh. Martin was defended by Henry Brougham, who had gained notoriety for defending Queen Caroline in 1821. Despite the jury ruling that he was guilty on a capital charge, which should have resulted in a death sentence, the judge declared him not guilty on the grounds of insanity. He was detained in Bethlem Royal Hospital in London, where he remained until he died 9 years later. During this period of detention, he made a number of drawings, including self-portraits and an apocalyptic picture of the destruction of London. His son, Richard, from his first marriage, was brought up by Jonathan's brother John. Richard committed suicide in September 1838, three months after his father's death.

Professor Herschel Prins has described Martin as "probably the most well-known example of a manic depressive arsonist".

== Legacy and Influence ==
Although notorious in his time, Jonathan Martin's fame would wane. The 2025 novel Jonathan Martin by Ansgar Allen retells his story, along with accounts of the life of his siblings and the fate of his son.
