= John Bailey Langhorne =

John Bailey Langhorne (12 November 1816 – 17 May 1877) was proprietor of the Newcastle Chronicle. He was the son of Mary Sussana Bailey and John Langhorne, a banker, of Berwick on Tweed.

On 2 May 1840 at Whitehall The Lord Chancellor appointed "John Bailey Langhorne of Newcastle-upon-Tyne, Gent., to be a master extraordinary in the High Court of Chancery". John Bailey Langhorne practiced as a solicitor in Wakefield, England. He lived at Outwood Hall, Wakefield.

He died aged 60 on 17 May 1877 at Outwood Hall, near Wakefield where he was described as being the District Registrar of the Probate Division of the High Court of Justice for the West Riding of Yorkshire.
