= Thirlwall Castle =

Castle in Northumberland, England

- Northumberland in England
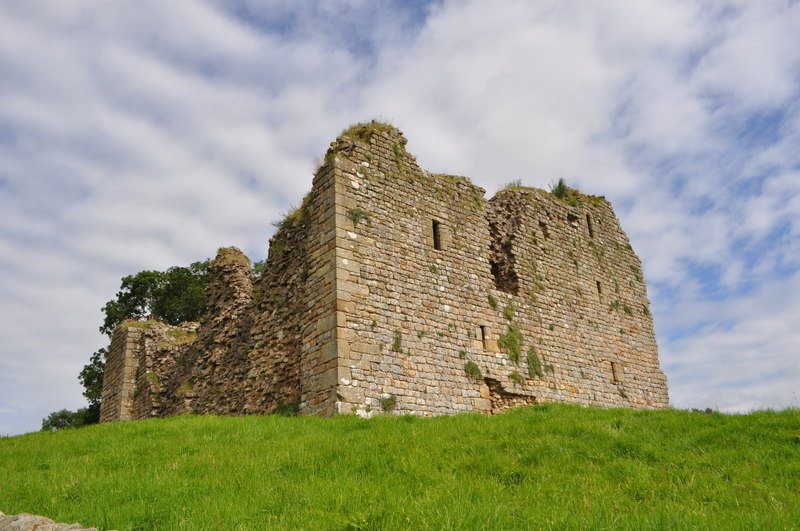
- Thirlwall Castle in 2011

Site information
- Type: Castle

Location
- Coordinates: 54.989°N 2.532°W
- Grid reference: Ny660661

Garrison information
- Designations: Grade I listed building Scheduled Monument

Thirlwall Castle is a 12th-century castle in Northumberland, England, on the bank of the River Tipalt close to the village of Greenhead and approximately 20 miles (32 km) west of Hexham. It was built in the 12th century, and later strengthened using stones from nearby Hadrian's Wall, but began to fall into disrepair in the 17th century. The site is protected by Grade I listed building and Scheduled Ancient Monument status.

== Meaning of name "Thirlwall" ==
"Thirlwall" combines Middle English Thirl, contracted with wall; in context, reference and proximity to Roman-built Hadrian's Wall from which Thirlwall Castle was materially built. Thirl [as verb] means "perforated-" or [as noun] "bored-wall", from the Old English þyrel, þyrl, "a hole made through anything, an aperture, orifice" and weall, "wall". As used and described in an Atlantic Monthly article, it is referenced as "a small passage built into a wall to allow sheep but not cattle to pass through ... a thirl, or a thawl". In Greek, the word Thura "θύρα thýra, [pronounced] thoo'-rah; apparently a primary word (compare "door"); a portal or entrance (the opening or the closure, literally or figuratively): "door, gate". The middle English noun thirl likewise references a portal; a through passage, gate or door [thura] through which lambs enter in. The Gospel of John (King James Version), tenth chapter conveys this same meaning: "Then said Jesus unto them again, Verily, verily, I say unto you, I am the door [thura] of the sheep. I am the door [thura]: by me if any man enter in, he shall be saved, and shall go in and out, and find pasture." (John 10:7;9). Thirl, corresponding identically in meaning to Greek thura, conjoined with wall then forms Thirlwall, having reference to the Roman-built Hadrian's Wall between Northeast England and Scotland in Northumbria.

== History ==
The home of the Thirlwall family, the castle was fortified in about 1330 by John Thirlwall. In a survey of 1542 it was reported as in the ownership of Robert Thirlwall and in a 'measurable good' state of repair.

Sir Percival Thirlwall of Thirlwall Castle was killed at the Battle of Bosworth whilst fighting in the Yorkist cause on 22 August 1485. He was Richard III's standard-bearer in the final charge at Bosworth. He held up the standard even after his legs had been cut from under him.

== Post medieval ==
Eleanor Thirwall, the last of the Thirlwall family line, abandoned the castle as a residence and the estate passed to the Swinburne family by her 1738 marriage to Matthew Swinburne of Capheaton Hall. Swinburne sold the estate to the Earl of Carlisle for £4000 in 1748.

Thereafter the castle fell into decay. In 1832 and again in 1982 there were serious collapses of masonry.

In 1999 the Northumberland National Park Authority took over the management of the castle, protecting it from further dereliction. It is open to the public without charge.
