= Bellister Castle =

19th-century mansion house near Haltwhistle, Northumberland, England

- Northumberland, England
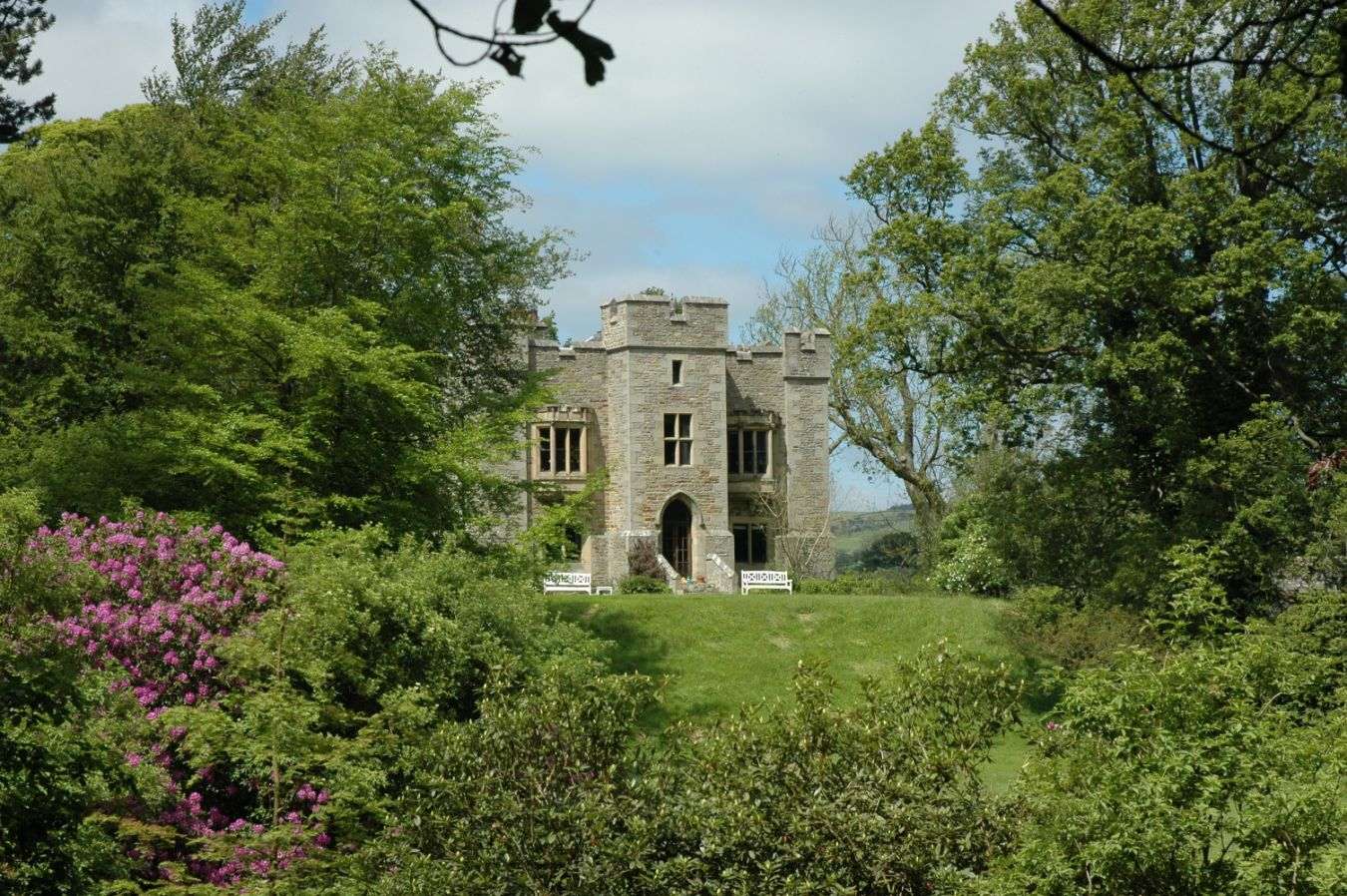
- Bellister Castle

Location
- Location in Northumberland
- Coordinates: 54.961°N 2.468°W
- Grid reference: NY701630

Bellister Castle is a National Trust owned castellated 19th-century mansion house attached to the ruinous remains of a 14th-century tower house, near Haltwhistle, Northumberland, England. It is a Scheduled Ancient Monument and a Grade I listed building. The house is leased as a private residence and not open to the public.

== History ==
The property stands on a mound which may have been the motte of an early motte and bailey castle. A moated hall house may have existed on the site in the 13th century and a substantial tower was added to the western end in the 14th century.

A survey of 1541 records a tower house occupied by Blenkinsop (of the family of nearby Blenkinsop Castle) in a 'measurable good' state of repair.

The Blenkinsop family sold their estates including Bellister in 1697 and the castle was thereafter held by several different owners. In about 1699 the property was enlarged into a three-storey castellated house.

A substantial rebuild by architect John Dobson in 1826 created an imposing castellated east front and further alterations took place in 1890 and in 1905 following serious fire damage in 1901. The older parts of the property were allowed to fall into decay and remain ruinous. The National Trust was gifted the property in 1976.

The property is not open to the public but can be seen from public footpaths in the adjacent woods.

== See also ==
- Hadrian's Wall
