= Briarwood Banks =

Protected area in Northumberland, England

- Site of Special Scientific Interest
- Location within Northumberland
- Location of Briarwood Banks.
- Area of search: Northumberland
- Grid reference: NY791620
- Coordinates: 54.952098°N 2.325437°W
- Interest: Biological
- Area: 24.0 hectares (60 acres)
- Notification date: 1955
- Location map: DEFRA MAGIC map

Briarwood Banks is the name given to a woodland Site of Special Scientific Interest (SSSI) in north Northumberland, North East England. Composed mainly of elm, oak and ash, the site is semi-natural and now recovering from the removal of planted conifers.

== Location and natural features ==
Briarwood Banks is situated in the south-west of the county of Northumberland, some 1.75 miles (2.82 km) south-south-east Bardon Mill and 3.4 miles (5.5 km) west south-west of Haydon Bridge. The site occupies the banks of a fan of north-east running tributaries of the north-running River Allen including Farnalees Burn, Black Sike and Kingswood Burn, and its north-east boundary is formed by the Allen. The designated woodland area is 0.79 miles (1.27 km) in length and up to 0.5 miles (0.80 km) wide, covering 24.0 hectares (59 acres) and falling from 190 metres (620 ft) above sea level in the south-west to 100 metres (330 ft) at the Allen confluence.

It is one of a number of SSSIs on the River Allen; to the south are Stewardpeel Woods starting 0.6 miles (0.97 km) upstream and the Allen Confluence Gravels some 1.8 miles (2.9 km) upstream.

== Vegetation ==
A number of distinct assemblages of flora are observed at Briarwood Banks. Dominant on lower slopes is wych elm (Ulmus glabra), beneath which are found dog’s mercury (Mercurialis perennis), woodruff (Galium odoratum), wood melick (Melica uniflora), giant bellflower (Campanula latifolia), enchanter’s nightshade (Circaea lutetiana) and wood avens (Geum urbanum). Oak (Quercus petraea) predominates the higher slopes with creeping soft-grass (Holcus mollis), false brome (Brachypodium sylvaticum), wood sorrel (Oxalis acetosella) and broad buckler-fern (Dryopteris dilatata); and on very acid soil beneath oaks, great wood-rush (Luzula sylvatica), bilberry (Vaccinium myrtillus) and common cow-wheat (Melampyrum pratense) are found.

Ash (Fraxinus excelsior) is found site-wide, together with occurrences of downy birch (Betula pubescens), bird cherry (Prunus padus), yew (Taxus baccata) and alder (Alnus glutinosa). Beech (Fagus sylvatica) and sycamore (Acer pseudoplatanus) in the woods are thought to survive from a historic management regime. Shrubs found in the woods include hazel (Corylus avellana), holly (Ilex aquifolium) and hawthorn (Crataegus monogyna).

Rocky outcrops on the site support hard shield-fern (Polystichum aculeatum) and hart’s-tongue (Phyllitis scolopendrium). By contrast, wet flushes on the site support giant fescue (Festuca gigantea), tufted hair-grass (Deschampsia cespitosa), bugle (Ajuga reptans), yellow pimpernel (Lysimachia nemorum) and meadowsweet (Filipendula ulmaria). Dark and damp areas of the woodland give rise to rare lichens such as (Biatorella monasteriensis), (Lobaria laetevirens) and (Leptogium teretiusculum), as well as mosses and ferns including epiphytic polypody (Polypodium vulgare) and oak fern (Gymnocarpium dryopteris).

Other plant species noted are rare wood fescue (Festuca altissima) found amongst moss on screes, mountain pansy (Viola lutea) on alluvial deposits on the bank of the Allen; and reflecting the influence of heavy metals leachate from the Northern Pennine Orefield, alpine penny-cress (Noccaea caerulescens) is found.

The condition of Briarwood Banks was judged to be 'unfavourable-recovering' in 2010 & 2012 inspections, as actions to remove non-native species and exclude grazing take effect.

== Fauna ==
Northumberland Wildlife Trust asserts that the woods are one of the most northerly habitats for dormice. Other species associated with the woods include roe deer and red squirrel. Bird species include the pied wagtail and the greater spotted woodpecker.

== Access ==
Northumberland Wildlife Trust manages 21.2 hectares (52 acres) of the site as a nature reserve with full public access, including provision for wheelchair users.

== See also ==
- List of Sites of Special Scientific Interest in Northumberland
