= Stawardpeel Woods =

Protected area in Northumberland, England

- Site of Special Scientific Interest
- Location within Northumberland
- Location of Stawardpeel Woods.
- Area of search: Northumberland
- Grid reference: NY 799630
- Coordinates: 54.961223°N 2.3154368°W
- Area: 101.3 acres (0.4099 km^{2}; 0.1583 sq mi)
- Notification date: 1996

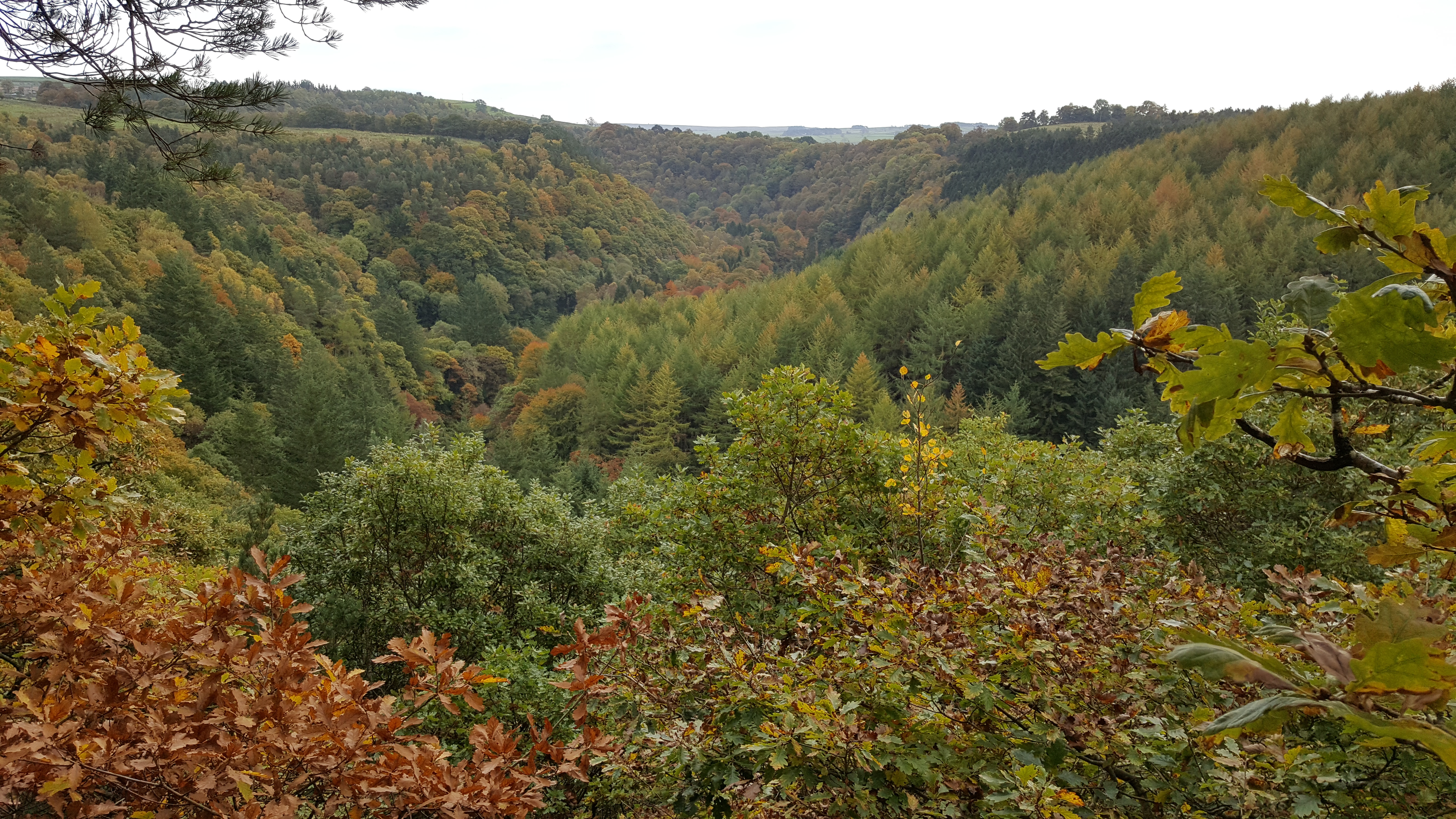
Stawardpeel Wood

Stawardpeel Woods is a Site of Special Scientific Interest (SSSI) in Northumberland, England. This protected area is located in the valley of the River Allen, near Bardon Mill. The protected area is owned by the National Trust, within the Allen Banks & Staward Gorge estate.

== Details ==
The woodland is protected because of the dormouse population recorded there. The red squirrel is also present. The main canopy tree is sessile oak. However, the woodland has been modified by planting with larch and norway spruce.

The grass species mountain melick has been recorded at this protected area. The oak fern occurs where the river gorge is deep.

Within this protected area is the remains of a building called a peel tower, that is called Staward Peel.

== Land ownership ==
All of the land within Stawardpeel Woods SSSI is owned by the National Trust.
