= Langley, Northumberland =

Village in Northumberland, England

Coordinates: 54.948°N 2.275°W

Langley
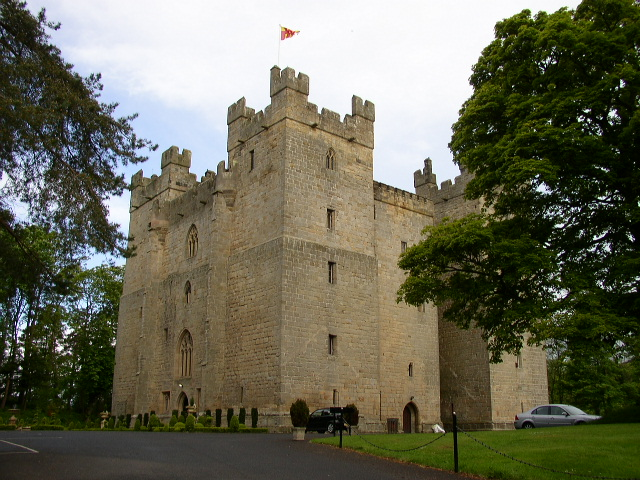
- Langley Castle

- Location within Northumberland
- OS grid reference: NY825615
- Civil parish: Haydon
- Unitary authority: Northumberland
- Ceremonial county: Northumberland
- Region: North East
- Country: England
- Sovereign state: United Kingdom
- Post town: HEXHAM
- Postcode district: NE47
- Dialling code: 01434
- Police: Northumbria
- Fire: Northumberland
- Ambulance: North East
- UK Parliament: Hexham

Langley or Langley-on-Tyne is a small hamlet in Northumberland, England, located to the west of Hexham.

The hamlet is on the A686 about 3 miles (5 km) south of Haydon Bridge and the South Tyne. There are currently just over 100 residents in Langley.

== Governance ==
Langley is in the parliamentary constituency of Hexham, Joe Morris of the Labour Party is the Member of Parliament.

For Local Government purposes it belongs to Northumberland County Council a unitary authority, with Langley lying in the Tynedale Division. Prior to the 2009 structural changes to local government in England it was part of Tynedale Council.

== Landmarks ==
Langley Castle is a restored medieval tower house, and a Grade I listed building. It was built in the middle of the 14th century as a great H-shaped tower of four storeys. Before this the site was the seat of the Barons of Tynedale in the 12th century, from whom descend the Tyndall family. It was attacked and severely damaged in 1405 by the forces of Henry IV in the campaign against the Percys and Archbishop Scrope. It remained as a ruin until it was bought and restored by a local historian, Cadwallader Bates, in the late 19th century. He died in 1902 and his wife Josephine continued the restoration. After she died in 1932 the building remained empty until it was used as a barracks in the Second World War, following which it was used as a girls' school. Inside Langley Castle are some of the best preserved Garderobes in Britain and these can be viewed from the main staircase. It has since been converted into a luxury hotel.

Staward Manor has an old Roman altar stone and, in 1999, a Roman road was discovered nearby.

Staward Gorge is a Victorian garden in a gorge of the River Allen. There are the remains of a medieval Pele tower. It is an area of Special Scientific Interest and the most northerly habitat of dormice in Britain, and while walking in the National Trust-owned Allen Banks and surrounding area, visitors may encounter deer and red squirrels.

== Industry ==
In 1768, the Commissioners of Greenwich Hospital established a lead smelting works at Langley to smelt their ore from Alston Moor. The skyline of Langley is still dominated by the lead smelting chimney with its underground flue leading to the old smelt works, now a sawmill, where the old tracks for the ore wagons can still be seen.

== Notable people ==
- Dame Catherine Cookson, author, lived in the village for many years.

== Sources ==
- Smailes, AE (1960). North England. Edinburgh: Thomas Nelson & Sons Ltd.
