= Allen Confluence Gravels =

Protected area in Northumberland, England

- Site of Special Scientific Interest
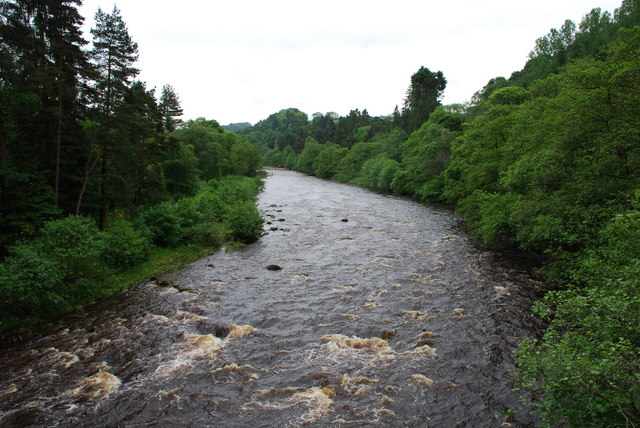
- River Allen from Cupola bridge showing the northern extent of the SSSI

- Location within Northumberland
- Location of Allen Confluence Gravels.
- Area of search: Northumberland
- Grid reference: NY800587
- Coordinates: 54.92284°N 2.31191°W
- Interest: Biological
- Area: 4.9 hectares (12 acres)
- Notification date: 1968
- Location map: DEFRA MAGIC map

The Allen Confluence Gravels is the name given to a Site of Special Scientific Interest (SSSI) in Northumberland, England. The site, listed since 1968, has an 'outstanding assemblage of river margin invertebrates.'

== Location and natural features ==
The Allen Confluence Gravels site is situated in the north-east of England, at the confluence of the River West Allen and River East Allen as they transition into the River Allen, some 3 miles (4.8 km) north-west of the village of Allendale in the south-west of the Northumberland.

The site is listed for its outstandingly diverse habitat for river-margin invertebrates. The site has a number of distinct habitat areas, including consolidated sand and shingle, well vegetated and rarely flooded; unstable shingle and sand banks subject to regular flooding; and damp woodland. Two species of rare ground beetles (Bembidion schueppeli and B. litorale) are found in areas having partially vegetated sandy banks. The water beetle Helophorus arvernicus is found in the muddy water margin.

The ground beetle Clivina collaris is found on flatter areas of the site, together with Caviphantes saxetorum, a money spider found under stones. On higher parts of sandy banks are found Aegalia sabuleti, a small chafer and Diplocephalus protuberans, another money spider.

Shingle fauna includes Bembidion monticola and B. stomoides, species of ground beetle; Fleutiauxellus maritimus, a small click beetle; Arctosa cinerea, a large wolf spider and Diplocephalus connatus, a money spider found in Britain only at this and one other north-east site.

The site's damp woodland supports a number of uncommon moths including Acasis viretata, the yellow-tarred brindle; Aporophyla nigra, the black rustic; and Idaea straminata, the plain wave moth. It also supports a ground beetle, Pterostichus cristatus found only in Northumberland and Durham; and a number of rare spiders including Centromerus persimilis.

Alpine penny-cress (Noccaea caerulescens) found at the site indicates heavy metal contamination of the river probably arising from mineral mines in the river's catchment area.

The condition of Allen Confluence Gravels was judged to be favourable in 2010, although concern was expressed about the incidence of Himalayan balsam (Impatiens glandulifera).

== See also ==
- List of Sites of Special Scientific Interest in Northumberland
