= Henshaw, Northumberland =

Village in Northumberland, England

Coordinates: 54.975°N 2.369°W

Henshaw
- Location within Northumberland
- Population: 762 (2011 Census data for Henshaw Parish)
- OS grid reference: NY765645
- Unitary authority: Northumberland
- Ceremonial county: Northumberland
- Region: North East
- Country: England
- Sovereign state: United Kingdom
- Post town: HEXHAM
- Postcode district: NE47
- Dialling code: 01434
- Police: Northumbria
- Fire: Northumberland
- Ambulance: North East
- UK Parliament: Hexham

Henshaw is a small village and civil parish in Northumberland, within the vicinity of the ancient Hadrian's Wall. It is located around 11.5 miles (19 km) from Hexham, 25.5 miles (41 km) from Carlisle, and 33 miles (53 km) from Newcastle upon Tyne.

Nearby landmarks include Allen Banks & Staward Gorge, Sycamore Gap, The Sill: National Landscape Discovery Centre and Vindolanda Roman Fort.

== Demography ==
The data below shows that 50.7% of the population in Henshaw (Parish) are male, and 49.3% are female. This compares similarly with that of the national average, as well as the average within the county of Northumberland.

A total of 0.1% of the population were from a black, Asian and minority ethnic (BAME) group in Henshaw (Parish). This figure is significantly lower than that of the average in Northumberland (2.6%), as well as the national average (14.6%).

Data from the Office for National Statistics found that the average life expectancy in the Haydon and Hadrian electoral ward is 81.9 years for men, and 85.4 years for women. These statistics compare very favourably, when compared to the average life expectancy in the North East of England, of 77.4 and 81.4 years, for men and women respectively.

Car ownership is very high in Henshaw (Parish), with a total of 92.1% households having access to at least one car. This is significantly higher than the average within Northumberland (78.0%), as well as the national average (74.2%).

Demography (data from 2011 Census)
Demographic	% of population Henshaw (Parish)	% of population Northumberland	% of population England
Total	762	316,028	53,012,456
Male	50.7%	48.8%	49.2%
Female	49.3%	51.2%	50.8%
BAME	0.1%	2.6%	14.6%
Age 65+	19.9%	20.2%	16.4%

== Education ==
Henshaw Church of England First School serves the village, providing education for students aged between 4 and 11 years old. The nearby Haltwhistle Academy provides education for students aged between 3 and 11 years old.

In terms of secondary education, Haydon Bridge High School provides secondary education for students aged between 11 and 16 years old, as well as post-16 study.

== Governance ==
Haydon and Hadrian is a local council ward in the county of Northumberland. This ward covers an area of around 89.1 square miles (230.8 km^{2}), and has a population of 4,454.

As of September 2020, the Haydon and Hadrian ward is served by Liberal Democrats councillor, Alan Sharp.

The village is located within the parliamentary constituency of Hexham. Joe Morris of the Labour Party is the Member of Parliament.

Northumberland County Council Local Elections 2017: Haydon and Hadrian
Candidate	Political party	Total votes	% of votes
Alan Sharp	Liberal Democrats	797	45.4%
Jan Harding	Conservative	538	30.7%
Chris Heslop	Independent	251	14.3%
Stephen Charles Grinter	Labour	123	7.0%
Barbara Jane Grundey	Green	44	2.5%

== Transport ==
=== Air ===
The nearest airports are Carlisle Lake District Airport and Newcastle International Airport, which are located around 20.5 and 30.5 miles (33 and 49 km) from the village by road respectively.

=== Bus ===
The village is served by Arriva North East and Stagecoach Cumbria & North Lancashire's 685 bus service, which provides one bus per hour linking Carlisle, Brampton and Haltwhistle with Hexham, Corbridge and Newcastle.

=== Rail ===
The nearest National Rail station is located at Bardon Mill, which serves the Tyne Valley Line. Northern Trains provide 11 trains per day from Bardon Mill to Carlisle, and 13 trains per day to Hexham and Newcastle. From nearby Haltwhistle, which is located around 4 miles (6 km) from the village, there is a more regular service provided, with two trains per hour to Carlisle, Hexham and Newcastle.

=== Road ===
The village is located near to the A69 road, which runs for 54 miles (87 km), from Carlisle to the A1 at Denton Burn.

== See also ==
- Bardon Mill
- Haltwhistle
- Melkridge
