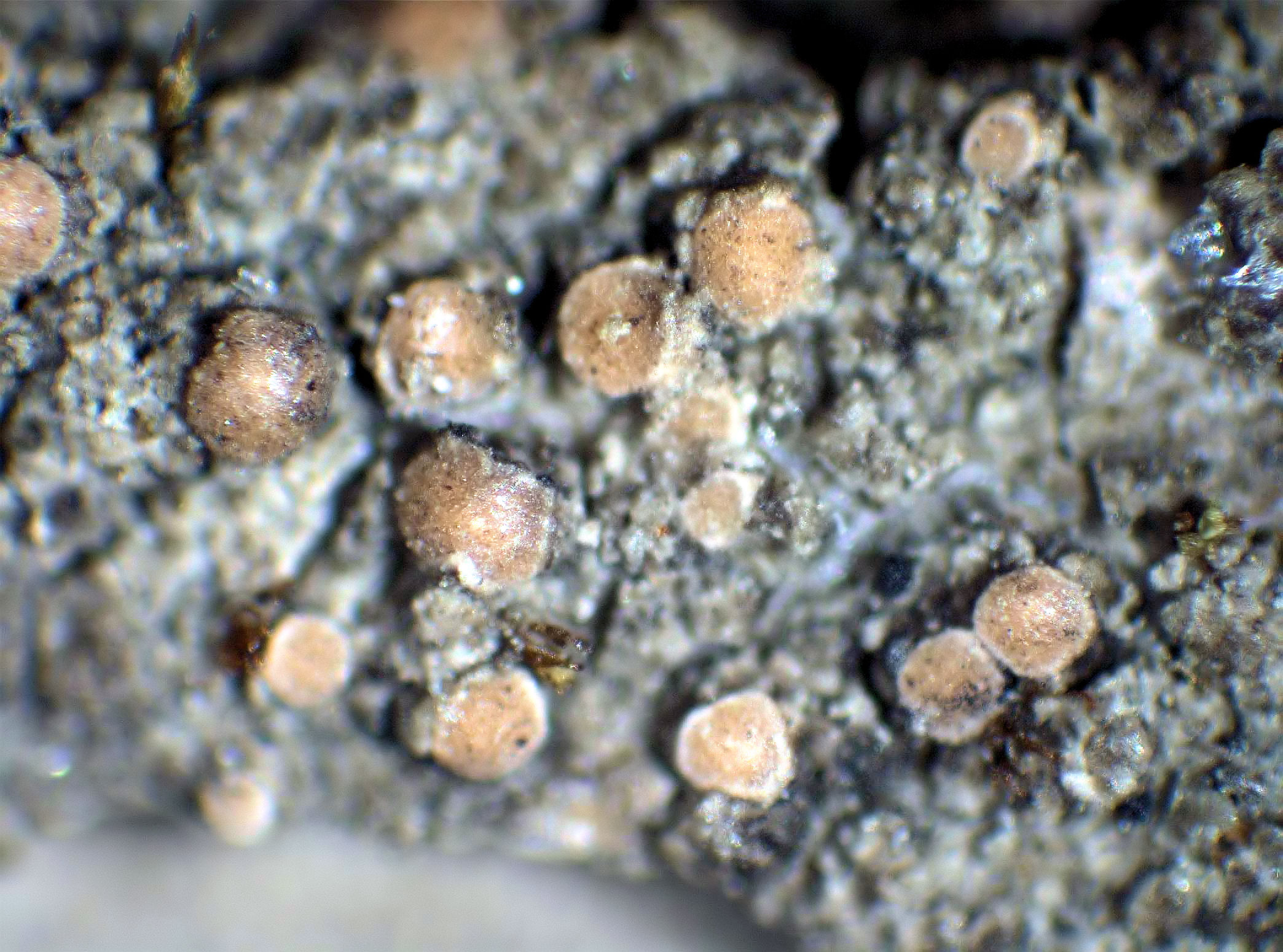
- Biatoridium monasteriense

Scientific classification
- Kingdom: Fungi
- Division: Ascomycota
- Subdivision: Pezizomycotina
- Class: incertae sedis
- Order: incertae sedis
- Family: incertae sedis
- Genus: Biatoridium; J.Lahm ex Körb. (1860)

Type species
- Biatoridium monasteriense J.Lahm ex Körb. (1860)

Species
- B. delitescens B. lasiothecium B. monasteriense

= Biatoridium =

Genus of lichen-forming fungi

Biatoridium is a genus of lichen-forming fungi of uncertain familial, ordinal, and class placement in the Ascomycota. The genus was established in 1860 by Gustav Wilhelm Körber and contains three recognised species. These lichens form thin, greenish to grey crusts that appear as a fine dusting on rock or bark surfaces. After being neglected for decades, the genus was resurrected in 1994 and is characterised by its pale yellow-brown fruiting bodies and spherical spores.

== Taxonomy ==
The genus Biatoridium was formally proposed by Gustav Wilhelm Körber in his Parerga Lichenologica (June 1860) for B. monasteriense, a lichen first collected on Robinia trunks in the castle gardens at Münster by Gottlieb Lahm earlier that spring. Körber's publication predates all other valid names for the group, making B. monasteriense the type species.

At almost the same time the Italian lichenologist Abramo Massalongo announced the name Chiliospora elegans during a lecture to the Venetian Academy in February 1860; however, that printed handout was never distributed widely enough to count as effective publication under the botanical code. The paper did not appear in the Academy's Atti until November 1860, by which point Körber's description had already been issued, so Chiliospora is regarded as a later synonym. Per Magnus Jørgensen's nomenclatural review confirmed that no changes are required and that Biatoridium retains priority.

After decades of neglect, Josef Hafellner resurrected the genus in 1994 and placed it within the order Lecanorales on morphological grounds. Subsequent authors have accepted this circumscription, leaving Chiliospora elegans and other historical names as synonyms of Biatoridium monasteriense.

== Description ==
Biatoridium forms a thin, crust-like thallus that appears as a greenish to grey dusting or as minute granules embedded in the underlying rock or bark. It lacks any distinct marginal zone (prothallus). The photosynthetic partner is a microscopic, spherical green alga (chlorococcoid phycobiont).

The sexual fruiting bodies are pale yellow-brown to light brown apothecia of the biatorine type. They sit flush with, or slightly above, the thallus and range from flat to gently convex. A well-developed exciple surrounds the disc. Internally, the basal tissue (hypothecium) is colourless to faint brown and made of intertwined hyphae that stain blue with iodine (I+). The surface layer (epithecium) is yellowish. Slender paraphyses thread the hymenium; they branch only rarely and have slightly thickened tips.

Each club-shaped (clavate) ascus contains numerous ascospores and shows a multilayered wall structure. Under the potassium-iodide (K/I) test the apical dome turns blue, the inner cap an intense blue, while the outer wall takes on a paler hue. The spores themselves are single-celled, colourless and spherical, and no outer gelatinous coat is present. An asexual stage has not been observed, and thin-layer chromatography has so far failed to detect any secondary metabolites (lichen products) in the genus.

== Species ==
As of July 2025, Species Fungorum accepts three species of Biatoridium:

- Biatoridium delitescens (Arnold) Hafellner (1994)
- Biatoridium lasiothecium C.A.Morse & Lendemer (2019)
- Biatoridium monasteriense J.Lahm ex Körb. (1860)

== See also ==
- List of Ascomycota genera incertae sedis
