= Thomas Bates (stockbreeder) =

English stockbreeder (1775–1849)

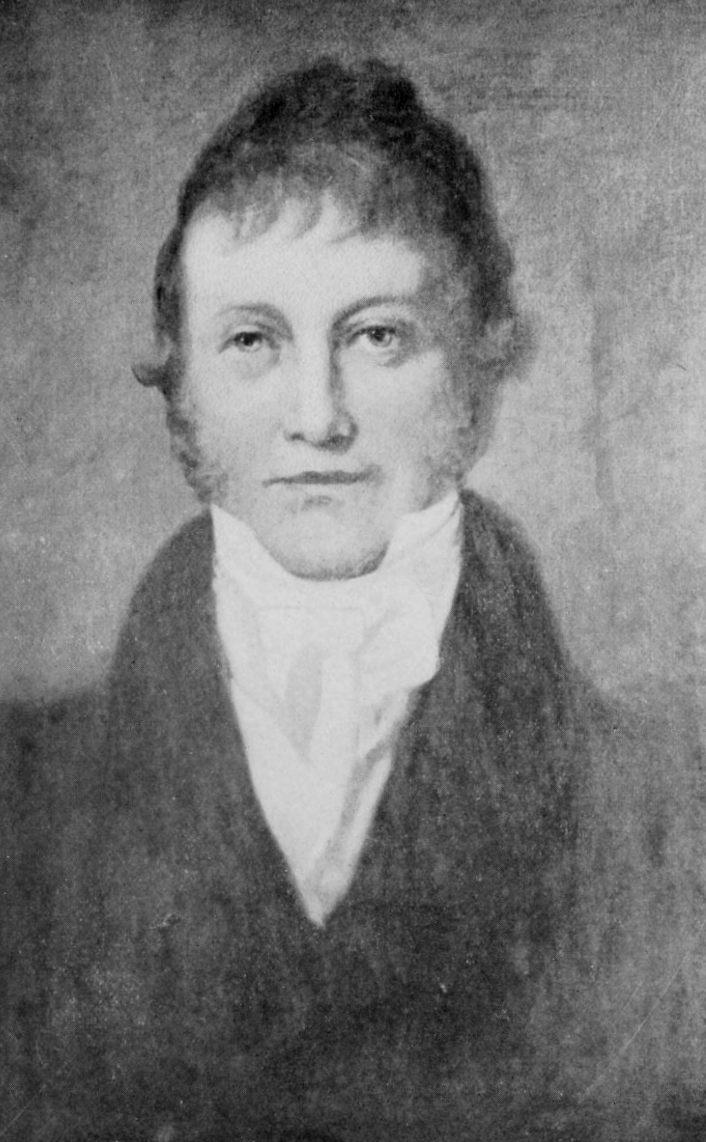
- Born: 21 June 1775; Matfen, Northumberland, England
- Died: 25 July 1849 (aged 74); Kirklevington, North Yorkshire, England
- Occupation: Stockbreeder

Thomas Bates (1775–1849) was an English stockbreeder.

== Biography ==
Thomas Bates was descended from a family long settled in Northumberland. He was born at Matfen, Northumberland, on 21 June 1775, the younger of the two sons of George Bates of Aydon Castle and his wife Diana (d. 1822), daughter of Thomas Moore of Bishop's Castle, Shropshire.

Bates was educated at the grammar school at Haydon Bridge, and afterwards at Witton-le-Wear school, where "he never joined in his schoolfellows' games, but would sit for hours in the churchyard with a book." At the age of fifteen he was called home to assist in the management of his father's farms. Before he was eighteen he became tenant of his father's patrimony at Aydon White House. In 1795 his mother's first cousin, Arthur Blayney of Gregynog, Montgomeryshire, who had always been expected to leave his property to Thomas (his godson), died, bequeathing all his heritage to Lord Tracy, a stranger in blood; and this was a great disappointment to Bates and his family.

He now threw himself with "quadrupled energy into an agricultural career," and on attaining his majority became tenant of his father's small estate of Wark Eals, on North Tyne. Becoming intimate with Matthew and George Culley, through a family marriage. Bates was introduced to a large circle of agricultural acquaintances on the Tees, including Charles and Robert Colling. In 1800, at the age of twenty-five. Bates took a twenty-one years' lease of two large farms at Halton Castle, at a high rent, and with a view to stocking them "purchased his first shorthorn cows from Charles Colling, giving him for one of them the first one hundred guineas the Collings ever sold a cow for."

He speedily achieved renown as a breeder of taste and judgment, and at Charles Colling's famous Ketton sale in 1810 he bought for 185 guineas a cow called Duchess, which was the foundress of a well-known tribe of shorthorns. He exhibited his cattle at the local shows from 1804 to 1812. Wishing to follow out the principles of George Culley in regard to experiments and trials, he embodied his views in 1807 in an elaborate letter, which he styled An Address to the Board of Agriculture and to the other Agricultural Societies of the Kingdom on the importance of an Institution for ascertaining the merits of different breeds of live stock, pointing out the advantages that will accrue therefrom to the landed interest and the kingdom in general. From 1809 to 1811 he spent his winters at the university of Edinburgh to study chemistry, and took, after his fashion, copious notes of the lectures on various subjects he attended. In 1811 he was sufficiently well off to buy a moiety of the manor of Kirklevington, near Yarm, in Cleveland, for £30,000, £20,000 of which he paid in cash. About ten years later, when his lease of Halton ran out, he bought Ridley Hall on the South Tyne, and resided there until 1831. He then removed to Kirklevington, where he lived for the remainder of his life.

He engaged in correspondence with most of the leading agriculturists of the day, and aired his own views very freely. Lord Althorp is said to have remarked to another guest when Bates paid him a visit at Wiseton Hall for the Doncaster meeting of 1820, "Wonderful man! he might become anything, even prime minister, if he would not talk so much." Bates was a man of remarkable force of character, but his love of argument, his combativeness, and his plain speaking did not make him a universal favourite.

Owing to his dissatisfaction with the awards at the Tyneside Society's show in 1812, he gave up showing cattle at agricultural meetings for twenty-six years, and did not again exhibit until the first show of the Yorkshire Agricultural Society, held at York in 1838, when he won five prizes with seven animals. A year later he made a great sensation at the first show of the then newly established English Agricultural Society, held at Oxford in 1839, with his tour shorthorns, all of which won the prizes, and one of which, called "Duke of Northumberland", was said to be "one of the finest bulls ever bred." Bates continued showing and winning prizes at subsequent meetings of the Royal Agricultural Society of England (under which name the English Agricultural Society was incorporated by charter in 1840) and had a great epistolary conflict with the executive after the York show of 1848, the last he attended.

Up to 1849 he had enjoyed robust health, living almost in the open air, and very simply; but a painful disease of the kidneys carried him off on 25 July 1849 at the age of seventy-four. An appreciative obituary in the Farmers' Magazine speaks of his liberality and hospitality, and describes his litigiousness as "but a nice and discriminating view of public duty":

Convince his judgment or appeal to his feelings, and he was gentle and yielding; but once rouse his opposition, and he was as untiring in his warfare as he was staunch and unflinching in his character ... He had a great delight in addressing the public, using very strong language, and always appearing in earnest. He wrote a vast number of letters to the newspapers, mainly on the politics of agriculture ... His writing was terse and forcible, and he had a remarkable tact in making facts bear upon his propositions, as well as a wonderful readiness in calculation and mental arithmetic.

The dispersal of Bates's herd of shorthorns on 9 May 1850 caused great excitement at the time, sixty-eight animals selling for £4,558 1s.

Bates was never married. A portrait of him at the age of about fifty-five by Sir William Ross, R.A., was engraved for the Farmers' Magazine in 1850, and a reproduction of it appears as the frontispiece of the elaborate biography of 513 pages written by Cadwallader John Bates (his great-nephew), and published at Newcastle in 1897 under the title Thomas Bates and the Kirklevington Shorthorns. From this work most of the above facts have been drawn.
