= Langley Castle =

Grade I listed castle in Langley, Northumberland, United Kingdom

- Langley, Northumberland in England
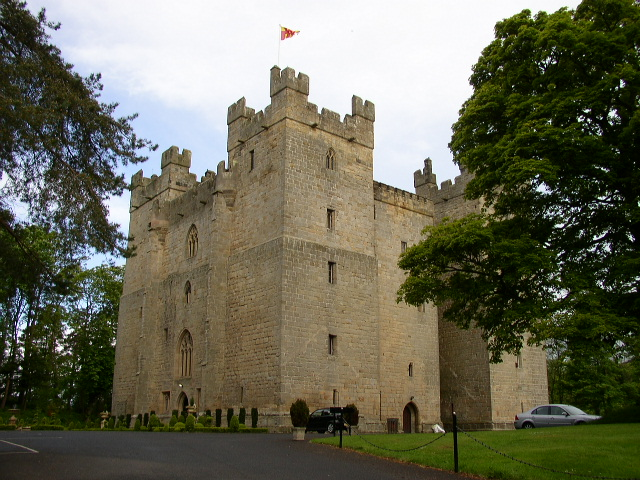
- Langley Castle, 2005

Site information
- Type: Tower house

Location
- Location within Northumberland
- Coordinates: 54.956°N 2.259°W
- Grid reference: NY835624

Garrison information
- Designations: Grade I listed building

Langley Castle is a restored medieval tower house, in the village of Langley in the valley of the River South Tyne. The castle is 3 miles (5 km) south of Haydon Bridge, in Northumberland, England. Langley Castle is a Grade I listed building. The property switched ownership several times over hundreds of years until Langley Castle was finally built in 1364. The castle was built in an H shape with four floors, and has four towers on each corner. The castle has several other unique architectural features. After being severely damaged by a fire in 1405, Langley Castle was left in ruins for 500 years until it was restored in 1914. In the last 100 years Langley Castle went through many uses, and now operates as a hotel.

== History ==
The Twelfth Century is when any record of Langley was first found, 200 years before the construction of Langley Castle. It was owned by Adam de Tindal in 1165 until he died in 1191 and his son, Adam de Tindal, inherited the land. When Adam de Tindal died, his daughter, Philippa de Tindal, became the heir of the property. In 1235 there is documentation that Philippa’s spouse, Nicholas de Boltby, was the owner of the property. When Nicholas de Boltby died, Langley was inherited by his daughter and her husband, Isobella and Thomas de Moulton. Thomas adopted his mother’s maiden name, becoming Thomas de Lucy. Following Isobella and Thomas de Lucy’s death their eldest son, Thomas de Lucy, became the owner of Langley in 1305. He died three years later and the property was passed to his younger brother, Anthony de Lucy.

In 1308 Anthony de Lucy put the property to use by holding annual fairs and markets for local people, until Langley was handed to his son, Thomas de Lucy, after his death in 1343. The de Lucy family home was a Manor House on the Langley land until David Bruce destroyed the Manor House in 1346.

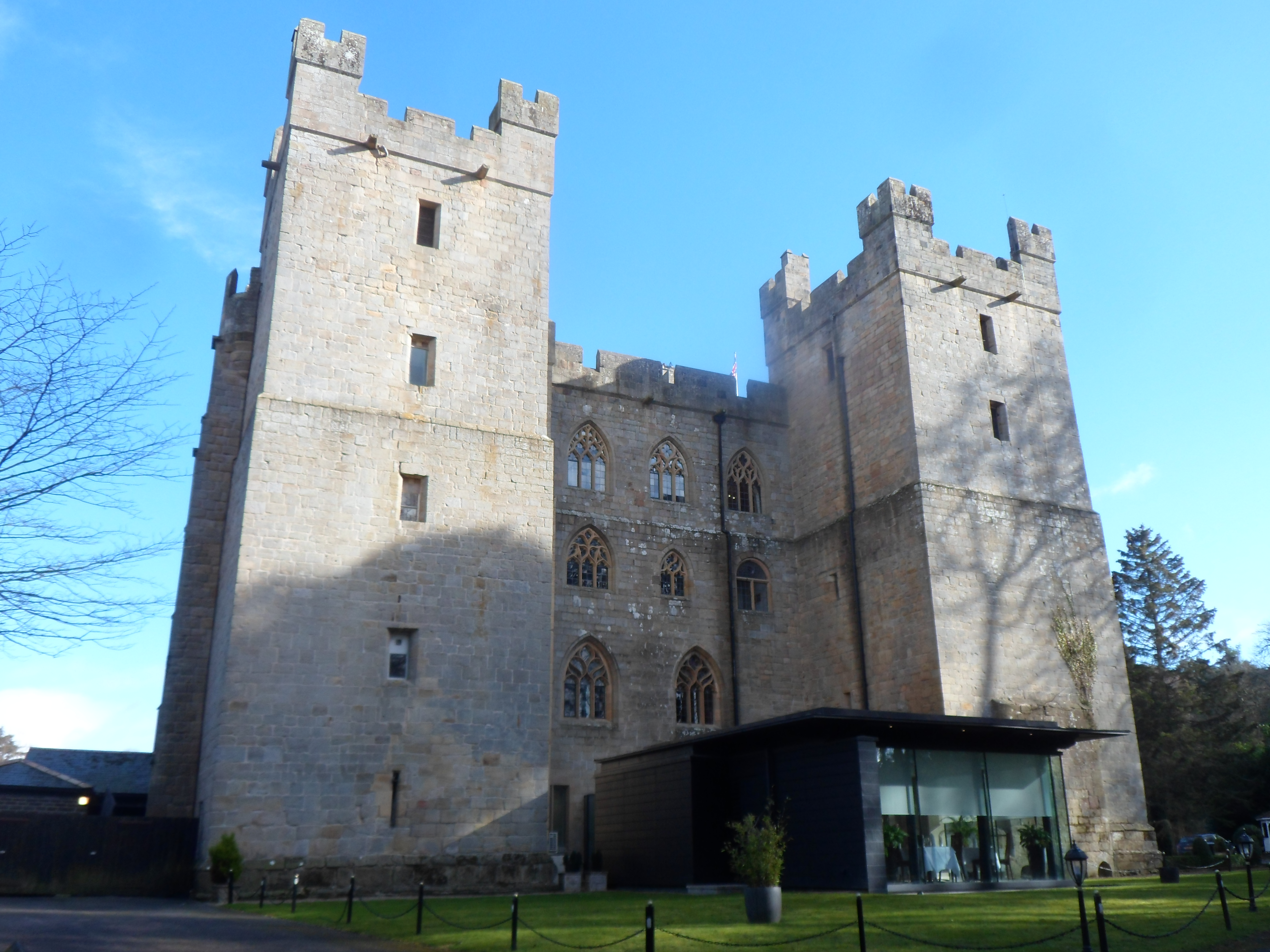
Langley Castle, now a hotel

Four years after the destruction of the Manor House the construction of Langley Castle started and was finished in 1364. Thomas de Lucy, died a year later and his daughter, Maud de Lucy inherited the property with her second husband the Earl of Northumberland, Henry Percy. In 1398, Maud de Lucy died, and Henry Percy along with his son Hotspur Percy took over Langley Castle.

In 1405, after the Percys did not pay their taxes to King Henry IV, the king gave Langley to Sir Robert Umfraville. Shortly before Umfraville was to take possession, Langley Castle was attacked and severely damaged by a fire in 1405 by the forces of Henry IV in the campaign against the Percys and Archbishop Scrope. Langley Castle lay destroyed for many years; in 1551 the crown gave full ownership to Thomas Percy, the sixth Earl of Northumberland. In 1568 Thomas Percy joined the Rising of the North Rebellion, but was captured and killed, so Langley Castle went back into the hands of the crown.

In 1625 Langley Castle was bought by John Murray, the first Earl of Annandale, from the crown. Six year later in 1631 Langley Castle was purchased from Murray by Sir Edward Radclyffe. In 1653, Sir Edward Radclyffe had all his property impounded for siding with the King. George Hurd from London then purchased Langley Castle. Edward’s son, Sir Francis Radclyffe, swiftly found the funds to buy Langley Castle and the rest of his father’s property back. Sir Francis Radclyffe was then raised to Earl of Derwentwater, Viscount Langley, and Baron Tynedale. Sir Francis Radclyffe died in 1696 and Langley Castle was inherited by his son Edward Radclyffe.

Edward Radclyffe married Lady Mary Tudor, an illegitimate daughter of King Charles II. Langley was then inherited by their son James Radclyffe, becoming the new Earl of Derwentwater and Viscount Langley. In 1714 James Radclyffe was a part of the Jacobite Rebellion which led to his capture and then execution in the Tower of London. After James Radclyffe died the Langley estate was yet again given back to the crown.

As a gift Langley Castle was given by the crown to the Governors of the Royal Hospital in 1749. In 1833 the governors appointed John Grey as the main person to oversee Langley Castle. With Grey's expert experience he increased the Langley estate’s annual income by £15,000. Langley was bought and restored by a local historian, Cadwallader Bates, in 1882. Bates unexpectedly died in 1902 before the restoration of the Castle was finished. Bate's wife Josephine continued the restoration, and Langley castle was finally finished in 1914.

After Josephine Bates died, in 1932 the building remained empty until it was used as a barracks in the Second World War, following which it was used as a girls' school. In the 1980s it was bought by the Robb family. In 1986, it was bought by Dr Stuart Madnick, a professor at the Massachusetts Institute of Technology, who converted it into a hotel. In 2022 he bought a seal that belonged to the first Baron of Langley, Adam de Tindal.

== Architecture ==
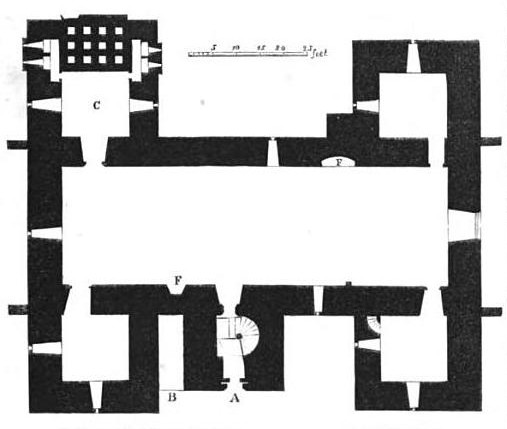
Ground plan of the castle from 1853; A - entrance; B - vaulted chamber; C - garderobe tower; F - fireplaces

Langley Castle is set in a woodland estate of 10 acres (40,000 m2). It was built in the middle of the 14th century by Sir Thomas de Lucy as an H-shaped tower of four storeys. It was originally built in 1350, but after the destructive fire of 1405 it lay in ruins for 500 years until Cadwallader Bates and his wife Josephine restored it in 1914.

The building is a quadrangular castle, fully solid with no courtyard. It has a main central hall and is an example of an upper floor hall house design. Each corner of the castle has a major tower that is one storey above the main building. There is an extra tower that is flush with the level of the roof.

This small pele-like structure has the original entrance to the castle connecting to the spiral staircase that leads to each floor. Langley Castle also has gigantic boulders that the walls are built on that serve as the foundation, making it difficult for an attempted break-in. Other additions added by Cadwallader Bates included increasing the size of the windows and putting a door on the south side of the castle.

Another unique feature is the portcullis slot and roof boss near the main entrance on the wall of the east side of the castle. There are also dual moulded doorways between the first-floor hallway and the entrance to the lobby. The chapel now serves as the Cadwallader Bates Memorial Room. One of the more remarkable features of the building is the South-West tower, which is occupied by 12 garderobes (toilets), four to each floor. This was very uncommon to see in houses and castles at the time. Each stall had its own pointed archway. These garderobes are some of the most exceptional remaining within this type of architecture in all of Europe. Although lots of restoration went on in the 20th century, many of the original medieval designs and architecture remain throughout the castle.

== See also ==
- Castles in Great Britain and Ireland
- List of castles in England
