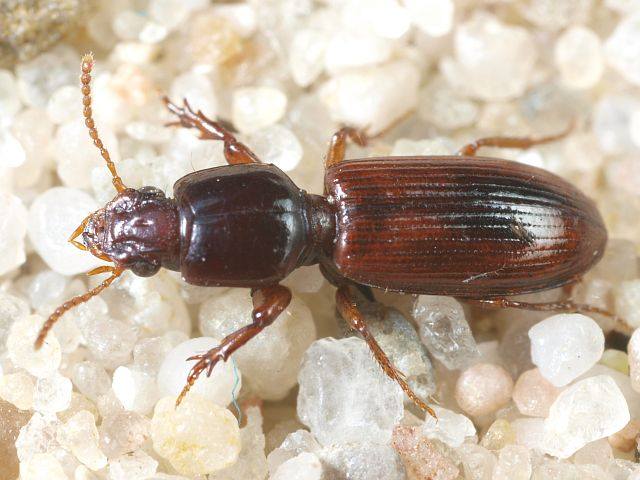
- Clivina collaris, location: The Netherlands - Nuenen - Nuenens Broek

Scientific classification
- Kingdom: Animalia
- Phylum: Arthropoda
- Class: Insecta
- Order: Coleoptera
- Suborder: Adephaga
- Family: Carabidae
- Genus: Clivina
- Species: C. collaris

Binomial name
- Clivina collaris (Herbst, 1784)

= Clivina collaris =

Species of beetle

Clivina collaris is a species of ground beetle in the subfamily Scaritinae. It was described by Herbst in 1784.

As it releases chemicals for defence through complex muscular system, if you step on it, you may got chemical released by pressure of weight. If chemical released comes in contact with skin it shows very minor burning sensation and it leaves your skin coloured like a dye.

Even washing with regular soap will not help removing colour marks on skin. No need to worry much about coming in contact with defence chemicals released by clivina collaris, some people might not feel any irritation or pain. Skin texture starts to return to normal after 30 mins.
