= Staward Peel =

- Northumberland, England, UK
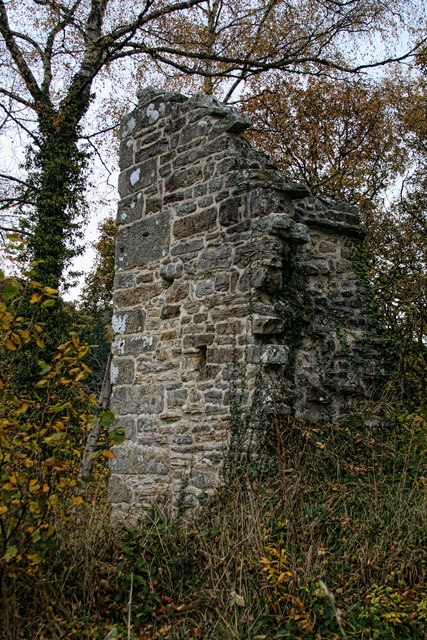
- Surviving ruins of Staward Peel

Site information
- Condition: Ruined

Location
- Location in Northumberland
- Coordinates: 54.94087°N 2.31253°W
- Grid reference: NU23062244

Site history
- Built: 1316
- Built by: Anthony de Lucy
- Materials: Timber, later stone
- Demolished: Before 1856

Staward Peel, or Staward Pele, is a peel tower located in the National Trust property of Allen Banks & Staward Gorge in Northumberland, England.

== History ==
A shrine likely existed on the site of the castle around 1271 and it is unknown when it was built or demolished; it was possibly of Roman origin. A pele built from timber was built on the site in 1316 by Anthony de Lucy of Langley, who stationed 15 men-at-arms and 15 hobelars here.

In 1326 King Edward II annexed the western part of Lucy's estate, which included Staward Pele. Recognising the defensible position of the site, Pele asked for tenders to demolish the pele and build a new larger defendable complex. Thomas II de Featherstonehaugh built a full scale castle on the site of the original pele.

The site was purchased in 1373 by Philippa of Hainault from John Darci le Cocin and Nicholas de Swinburne and then it was passed to Edmund, Duke of York. The Dukes of York then rented it to Hexham Priory in 1385 until the Dissolution of the Monasteries. The site was then found by the crown and it was passed to the Earl of Dunbar in 1603.

In 1613, King James I gave Staward to Lord Howard of Walden who later gave it to John Sanderson of Healey. In 1664 he sold the premise for £450 to George Bacon of Broadwood Hall. Nearby "Staward Manor House" in the parish of Haydon, Northumberland, contains initials on a lintel of George Bacon and his wife Cecilia Robson dated 1668, founders of the Bacon family "of Stewart Pile" (i.e. Staward Peel), Styford and Newton Cap in Durham. Their second son John Bacon (d.1736) was High Sheriff of Northumberland in 1693.

A plan of Staward Peel was created in 1759 showing the ruins at that time. These indicate a gatehouse, curtain wall and a keep-like feature were present, indicating that Featherstonehaugh's structure was likely a castle. It was demolished before 1856 and only masonry ruins of three of the outer walls from the gatehouse, and remains of the ditch and earthworks also exist today.

The site also appears to have been robbed of any surviving rubble present on the site at the time of demolition. in 1947/8 the Roman altar that was incorporated near the top fell and was later relocated at Low Staward Manor.
