= Melkridge =

Village in Northumberland, England

Coordinates: 54.969°N 2.409°W

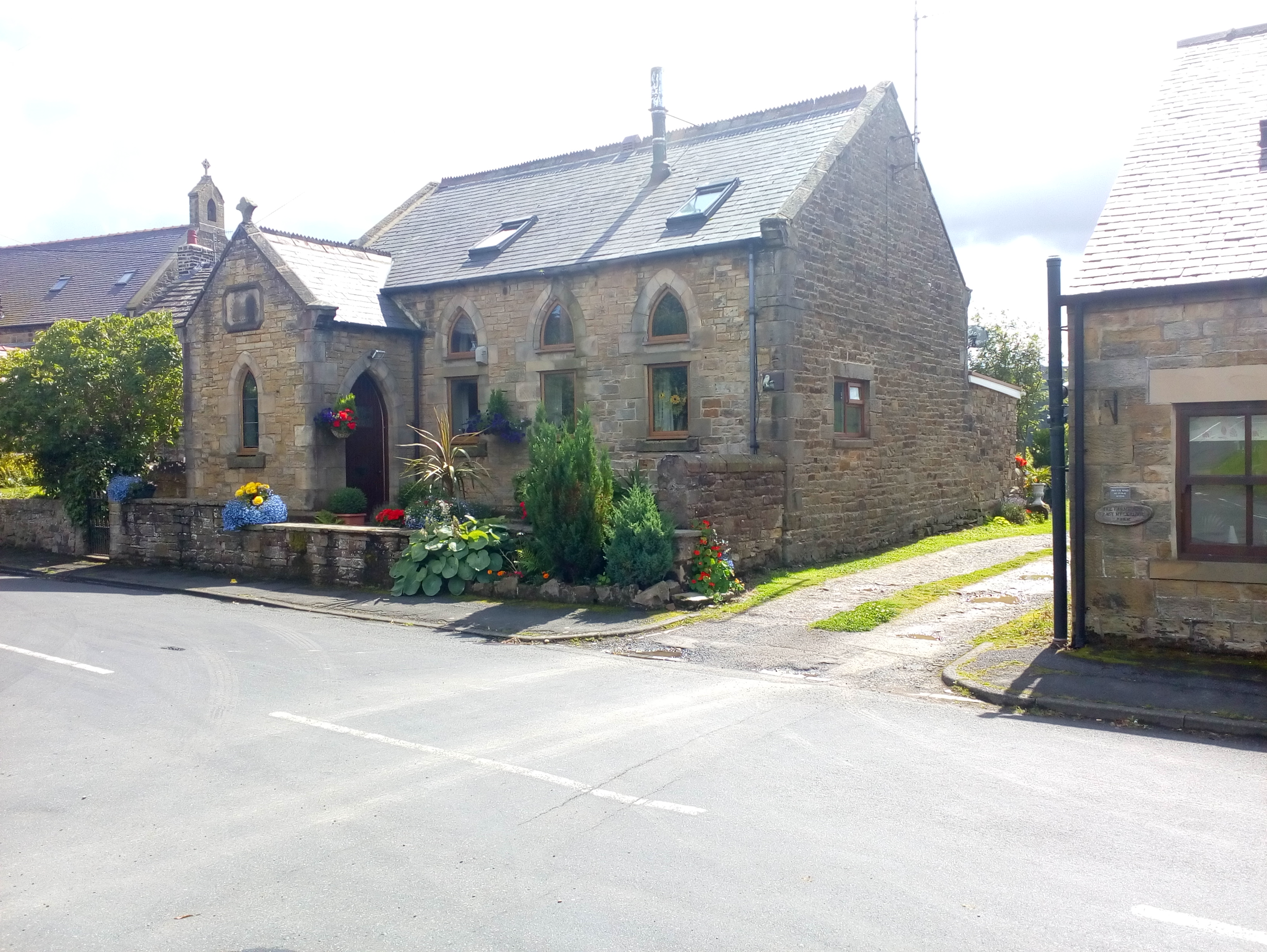
- Melkridge chapel is now a residence

- Location within Northumberland
- Population: 216 (2011 UK census)
- OS grid reference: NY738639
- Civil parish: Melkridge
- Unitary authority: Northumberland
- Ceremonial county: Northumberland
- Region: North East
- Country: England
- Sovereign state: United Kingdom
- Post town: HALTWHISTLE
- Postcode district: NE49
- Dialling code: 01434
- Police: Northumbria
- Fire: Northumberland
- Ambulance: North East
- UK Parliament: Hexham

Melkridge is a village and civil parish in Northumberland, England, on the river South Tyne. The village of Melkridge is in the south of the parish, and is about two miles (3 km) east of Haltwhistle along the A69 road. At the 2001 the civil parish had a population of 212, increasing slightly to 216 at the 2011 Census.

== History ==
Melkridge is the locus of prehistoric settlement dating to about 500 to 2500 BC.

== Governance ==
Melkridge is in the parliamentary constituency of Hexham.

== Transport ==
Melkridge has no Railway station, despite its proximity to the tracks of the Newcastle to Carlisle line, served by Northern Rail. The nearest stations to Melkridge are at Bardon Mill and Haltwhistle. Melkridge is however served by the 685 bus service, operated by Arriva and Stagecoach, between Newcastle and Carlisle.

== Education ==
Children living within the Parish of Melkridge in school years Reception – four fall primarily within the catchment areas of Tynedale Community Campus Lower School (Formerly Haltwhistle First School) and Henshaw Church of England Controlled First School. They then fall within the catchment area of Tynedale Community Campus Upper School for school years 5–8 and finally Haydon Bridge High School (HBHS) for years 9–11. For those students wishing to study at A Level, HBHS has a provision for 6th Form students aged 16–18.

== See also ==
- Henshaw
- Housesteads
- Rowfoot
- Stanegate
- Haltwhistle
