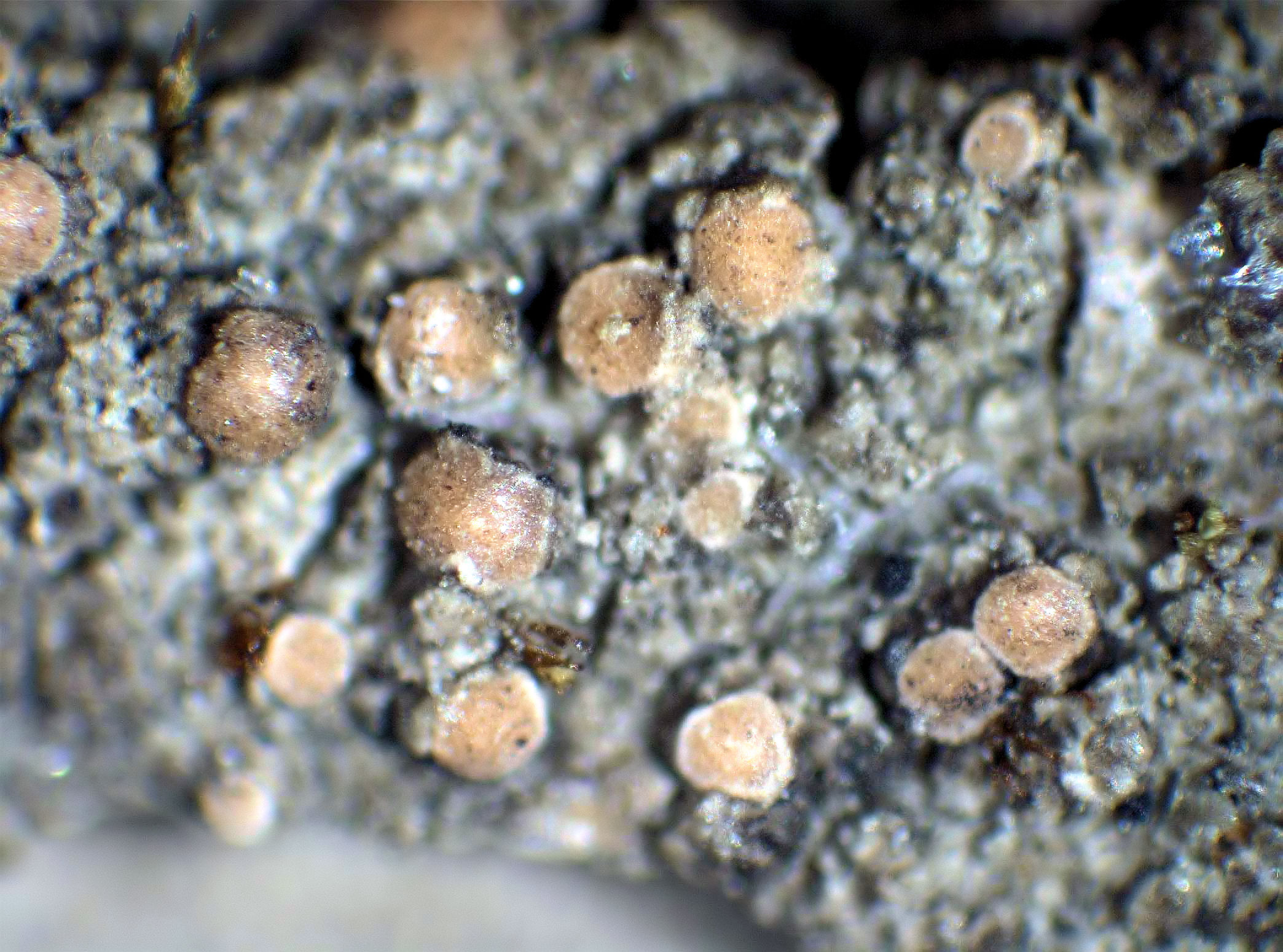

Scientific classification
- Domain: Eukaryota
- Kingdom: Fungi
- Division: Ascomycota
- Class: incertae sedis
- Order: incertae sedis
- Family: incertae sedis
- Genus: Biatoridium
- Species: B. monasteriense

Binomial name
- Biatoridium monasteriense J.Lahm ex Körb.

Synonyms
- List: Biatora monasteriensis (J.Lahm ex Körb.) Müll.Arg. (1862); Biatorella monasteriensis (J.Lahm ex Körb.) J.Lahm (1884); Lecidea monasteriensis (J.Lahm ex Körb.) Nyl. (1883); Biatorella elegans (A.Massal.) Stizenb. (1862); Biatoridium elegans (A.Massal.) Reinke (1895); Chiliospora elegans Hepp ex A.Massal. (1860)

= Biatoridium monasteriense =

Species of lichen

Biatoridium monasteriense is a species of lichen-forming fungus of uncertain placement in the Ascomycota. It is the type species of Biatoridium, a genus resurrected by Josef Hafellner in 1994. The lichen is found in central and northern Europe, as well as the Pacific Northwest region of northern North America.

== Habitat and distribution ==
Biatoridium monasteriense has a comparatively narrow natural range centred on western and central Europe. It was first described from Münster in Germany and remains scarce throughout that region, with records scattered from the Low Countries through Denmark and southern Scandinavia to the Alps and the British Isles. Recent work confirms its extreme rarity and ongoing decline in continental Europe – for instance, it has disappeared from parts of the Eifel and is red-listed in several national assessments. A single collection from ash coppice in the province of Utrecht published in 2016 represents the first Dutch record and lies near the geographical centre of the species' European range. Outside Europe it is known only from disjunct occurrences in the Pacific Northwest of North America.

The lichen is an obligate epiphyte on deciduous trees with chemically neutral bark. Most European collections come from field-maple (Acer campestre), elm (Ulmus spp.), elder (Sambucus nigra) and, especially, old coppiced ash (Fraxinus excelsior). It favours deeply fissured, permanently moist bark on ancient stools where shaded crevices, overhanging buttresses and water-retentive sponge-like cortex provide a stable microclimate. In such sites it often co-occurs with the bryophyte community Anomodonto–Isothecietum, alongside mosses such as Anomodon viticulosus and Isothecium alopecuroides, and with moisture-tolerant lichens including Peltigera praetextata.

== Conservation ==
Biatoridium monasteriense is listed on national Red Lists throughout its west- and central-European range and has already vanished from several historical strongholds, including the Eifel uplands of Germany. Its Dutch population, discovered only in 2015, occurs on a handful of veteran ash stools within ancient coppice woodland, and even there the outlook is described as uncertain. No formal assessment has yet been made for the disjunct Pacific Northwest occurrences, which are known from very few modern collections.

The principal threats are the progressive abandonment of traditional ash coppice management and the rapid spread of ash die-back (Hymenoscyphus fraxineus), both of which hasten the structural collapse of multi-stemmed stools that provide the permanently humid, neutral bark required by the lichen. Loss of canopy shelter through unsympathetic thinning, encroachment by shade-casting understory such as blackthorn, and subsequent attack by wood-decay fungi further desiccate or physically destroy occupied microhabitats. Conservation measures therefore centre on retaining veteran ash, reinstating rotational coppicing where feasible, and monitoring surviving stands for the combined impacts of dieback and bark fragmentation.

National red-list assessments confirm that B. monasteriense is threatened across much of its range. Germany classifies it as Endangered because of a strong, long-term decline in occupied woodlands. The British Lichen Society likewise lists the species as Endangered for Great Britain as a whole, whereas the Welsh regional red list upgrades it to Critically Endangered owing to its occurrence in only a handful of modern 10 km grid-squares. In central Europe it is assessed as Vulnerable in the Czech Republic but Critically Endangered in neighbouring Slovakia, while the latest Polish evaluation treats it as Near Threatened after the discovery of several new localities in primeval forest reserves.
