= Cadwallader John Bates =

English historian and antiquarian

- Born: 14 January 1853; Kensington, London, England
- Died: 18 March 1902 (aged 49); Langley Castle, Northumberland, England
- Occupations: Antiquarian historian Farmer & colliery owner
- Spouse: Josephine d'Echarvine 1895
- Parent(s): Thomas Bates (1810–1882), Emily Batten/Bates

Cadwallader John Bates (14 January 1853 – 18 March 1902) was a historian and antiquarian who focused on Northumberland.

== Life ==
=== Family provenance ===
Cadwallader Bates was born at Kensington Gate on the west side of London. His father, Thomas Bates (1810–1882) was a Northumberland gentleman-farmer with land in the Hexham area. Thomas Bates was also a lawyer, and had been a fellow of Jesus College, Cambridge between 1834 and 1849. The Bates family had been based in England's northern border regions for five centuries, and in the nineteenth century they were a prosperous family. The boy's mother, Emily Batten, came from the southwest of the country, however, and had close family connections with Wales, which explains how the couple's eldest son came to be given the resoundingly Welsh name, "Cadwallader".

Cadwallder Bates was a great nephew of Thomas Bates (1775–1849) who had been a famously successful stockbreeder: after his death his herd of 68 shorthorn cattle had been sold for over £4,500 in 1850.

=== Education ===
Bates entered Eton College in 1866. However, problems with his eyes obliged him to leave after two years. He then, in 1869, started a degree course at his father's old college, Jesus College, Cambridge. His eye problems again intervened, preventing him from taking his Tripos exams in the normal way. He accordingly received, in 1871, an "Aegrotat" degree in Moral Sciences, which was at that time a recently introduced degree subject at Cambridge. One source highlights the career limiting impact of his failure to obtain a normal first degree, but the college nevertheless allowed him to stay, and receive an MA degree in 1875. He was then able to compensate for any gaps in his education through what the same source identifies as "the education of travel", visiting little known areas of mainland Europe, notably in Germany and in Poland: in the process he accumulated a large bank of cultural and historical knowledge.

=== County and commercial duties ===
In 1882 Thomas Bates died and Cadwallader inherited his father's estates. From now on, Cadwallader Bates would have less time available for overseas travel. No fewer than four of his uncles had predeceased Thomas Bates, dying without direct heirs of their own, and apparently leaving their wealth to Cadwallader. This included his uncle Edward Bates who had left him Schloss Clöden in Brandenburg. In addition to extensive, mostly rough, farmland in the north of England, his inherited assets in England included a valuable share in Heddon Colliery where he had already worked in the colliery office. He undertook with energy the "county duties" appropriate to his wealth and social status, serving as a magistrate and deputy lieutenant. In 1890 he served as High sheriff for Northumberland.

Cadwallader John Bates – Publications (not a complete list) as listed by J. C. Hodgson, F.S.A.
- 1880: LiPiEC, or, A July in the Polish Highlands
- 1883: The Barony and Castle of Langley
- 1885: Heddon-on-the-Wall — the Church and Parish
- 1886: Three Papal Bulls confirmatory of the Possessions of the Riddells of Riddell
- 1887: On the Armorial Devices attributed to the County of Northumberland
- 1889: The Dedications of the Ancient Churches and Chapels in the Diocese of Newcastle
- 1891: Border Holds
- 1892: Names of Persons and Places mentioned in the Early Lives of St. Cuthbert
- 1892: Flodden Field
- 1893: Bamburgh Castle
- 1894: A Forgotten Reference to Roman Mile Castles
- 1895: A History of Northumberland
- 1895: Dunstanborough Castle
- 1895: Architectural Descriptions of the Towers at Embleton, Craster, Rock and Proctor Steads
- 1897: The Distance Slabs of the Antonine Wall and the Roman Names of its Fortresses
- 1897: The Beornicas and the Deras
- 1897: The Home of St. Cuthbert's Boyhood
- 1897: The Early Swinbornes of East and West Swinburn
- 1897: Nine-banks Tower
- 1897: The de Insulas of Chipchase
- 1897: Winwedfield: The Overthrow of English Paganism
- 1897: Thomas Bates and the Kirklevington Shorthorns.
- 1898: Three additional Miracles ascribed to St. Acca of Hexham
- 1899: The Brothers Colling
- 1899: Warkworth Castle
- 1899: Warkworth Hermitaget
- 1899: Life of St. Henry of Coquet
- 1902: Bywell Castle
- 1902: Edward III at Blanchland
- 1902: St. Patrick's Early Home

=== Langley Castle ===
It was also in 1882 that Cadwallader purchased Langley Castle in Northumberland, then a ruin. Restoring the castle, making it suitable for occupation as a home, became a life-time's project; restoration would be far from completed at the time of his sudden death. His young widow, Josephine, continued with the restoration project until her own death in 1932, however.

=== The writer ===
The footprint Cadwallader Bates left on history is in large measure due to his work as an historian and antiquarian. He started many books on aspects of Northumberland, most of which he finished. His particular focus was on the Medieval period. In addition to secular history, he took an interest in church history, at one point becoming embroiled in a sustained investigation into the "correct" date for Easter, having regard to the writings of Saint Columba, the evangelising Irish saint whose disciple-successors, more than a thousand years earlier, had expanded the Celtic church into the Kingdom of Northumbria. He also wrote a careful biography of his uncle, the stockbreeder Thomas Bates (1775–1849).

Bates was for many years an energetic member of the Society of Antiquaries of Newcastle upon Tyne, contributing numerous research papers to the society's "Proceedings".

=== Personal ===
In 1893, while visiting what would then have been known as Austrian Poland, Cadwallader Bates was received into the Uniate (Eastern Catholic) Church. Two year later, in 1895, he married Josephine d'Echarvine from Talloires in Savoy. There would be no surviving children from the marriage, however.

In March 1902 Bates suffered a heart attack and died very suddenly at his Langley Castle home. His widow continued to live at the castle and to concern herself with its restoration till her own death three decades later.
