= Bardon Mill =

Village in Northumberland, England

Coordinates: 54.975°N 2.337°W

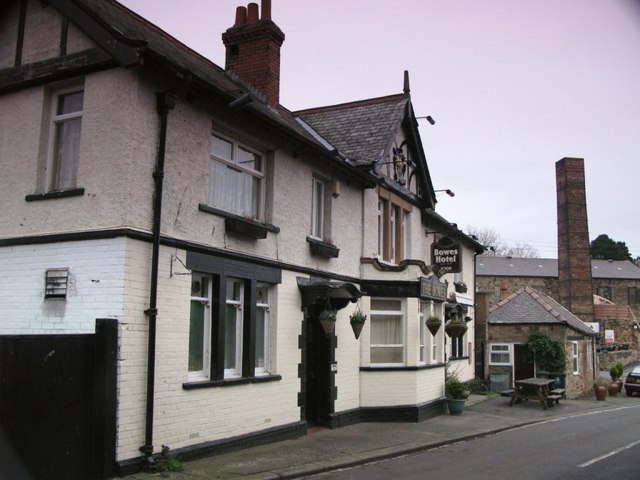

- Location within Northumberland
- Population: 452 (2011 Census data for Bardon Mill Parish)
- OS grid reference: NY785645
- Unitary authority: Northumberland
- Ceremonial county: Northumberland
- Region: North East
- Country: England
- Sovereign state: United Kingdom
- Post town: Hexham
- Postcode district: NE47
- Dialling code: 01434
- Police: Northumbria
- Fire: Northumberland
- Ambulance: North East
- UK Parliament: Hexham

Bardon Mill is a small village in Northumberland, within the vicinity of the ancient Hadrian's Wall. It is located around 10 1/2 miles (17 kilometres) from Hexham, 26 1/2 mi (43 km) from Carlisle, and 32 mi (51 km) from Newcastle upon Tyne.

Nearby landmarks include Allen Banks & Staward Gorge, Sycamore Gap, The Sill: National Landscape Discovery Centre and Vindolanda Roman Fort.

== Amenities ==
The local pub in Bardon Mill is The Bowes Hotel. Church services alternate weekly between St. Cuthbert's Church at Beltingham and the Church of All Hallows at Henshaw, both of which are very close to the village. There is a very active Women's Institute.

A leek club show is held every year, the produce from which is auctioned along with donations the day after the show. Funds are then donated to local charities.

Every October, there is the Bardon Mill and Roman Empire conkers championships, which is held on the village green. Local community projects are asked to run a stall at the event to raise funds for their own or community projects.

== Demography ==
The data below shows that 49.3% of the population in Bardon Mill (Parish) are male, and 50.7% are female, which is similar to the national average (49.2 and 50.8% respectively) and the average within the county of Northumberland (48.8 and 51.2% respectively).

A total of 1.8% of the population were from a black, Asian and minority ethnic (BAME) group in Bardon Mill (Parish). This figure is lower than that of the average in Northumberland (2.6%), as well as being significantly lower than the national average (14.6%).

Data from the Office for National Statistics found that the average life expectancy in the Haydon and Hadrian electoral ward is 81.9 years for men, and 85.4 years for women. These statistics compare very favourably, when compared to the average life expectancy in the North East of England, of 77.4 and 81.4 years, for men and women respectively.

Car ownership is very high in Bardon Mill (Parish), with a total of 95.3% households having access to at least one car. This is significantly higher than the average within Northumberland (78.0%), as well as the national average (74.2%).

Demography (data from 2011 Census)
| Demographic | % of population Bardon Mill (Parish) | % of population Northumberland | % of population England |
|---|---|---|---|
| Total | 452 | 316,028 | 53,012,456 |
| Male | 49.3% | 48.8% | 49.2% |
| Female | 50.7% | 51.2% | 50.8% |
| BAME | 1.8% | 2.6% | 14.6% |
| Age 65+ | 20.6% | 20.2% | 16.4% |

== Economy ==
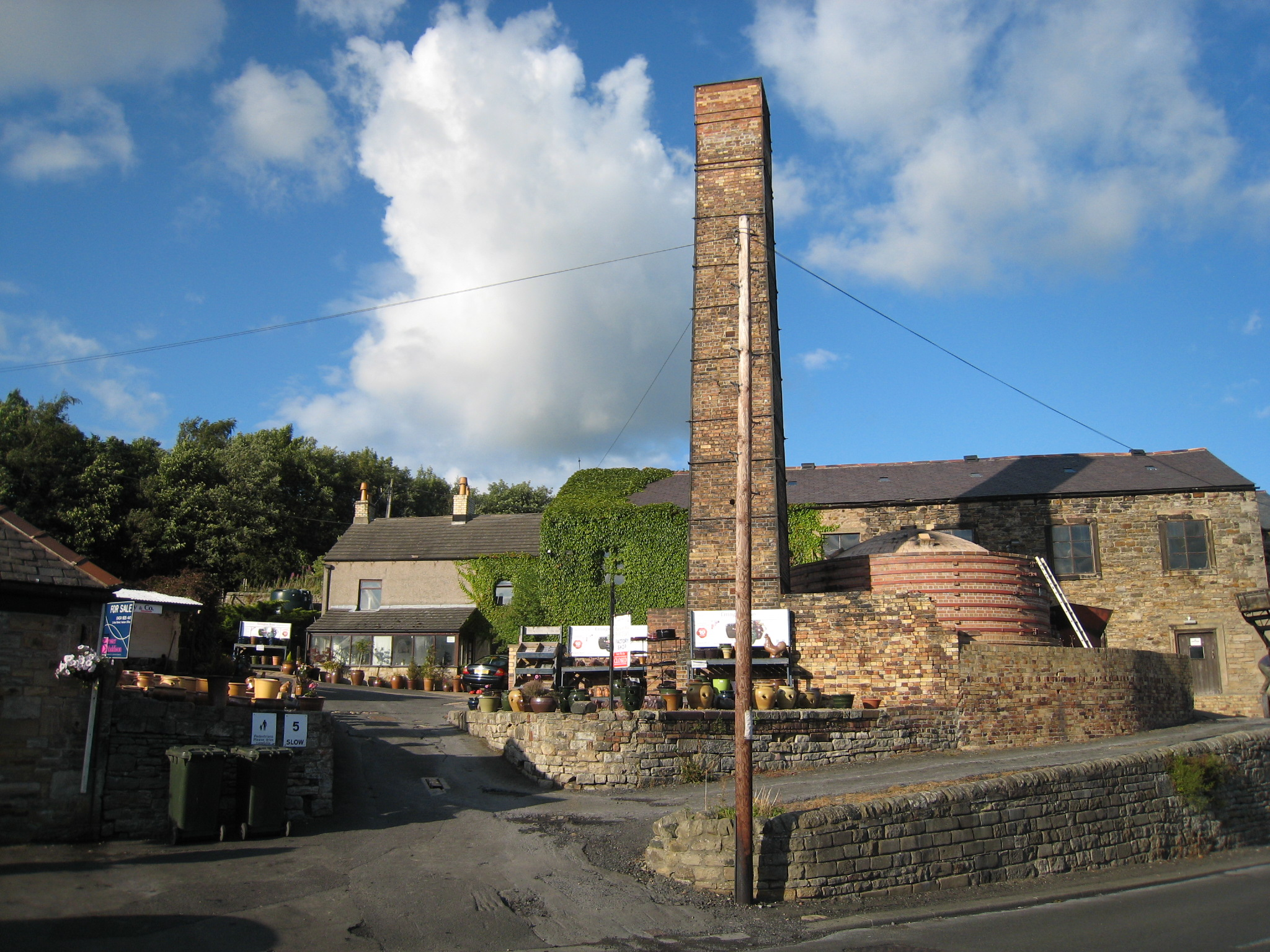
The Errington Reay pottery

The only commercial pottery in the United Kingdom currently licensed to produce salt glaze pottery is Errington Reay & Co., which was established in the village in 1878.

== Education ==
Henshaw Church of England First School is located in the neighbouring village of Henshaw, providing education for students aged between 4 and 11 years old. The nearby Haltwhistle Academy provides education for students aged between 3 and 11 years old.

In terms of secondary education, Haydon Bridge High School provides secondary education for students aged between 11 and 16 years old, as well as post-16 study.

== Folklore ==
A nearby farm is reputed to be haunted by the ghost of a robber, who was murdered there in the 14th century. The last alleged sighting was in 1933.

== Governance ==
Haydon and Hadrian is a local council ward in the county of Northumberland. This ward covers an area of around 89.1 square miles (230.8 km^{2}), and has a population of 4,454.

As of September 2020, the Haydon and Hadrian ward is served by Liberal Democrats councillor, Alan Sharp.

The village is located within the parliamentary constituency of Hexham, and is represented by Labour Party Member of Parliament (MP), Joe Morris.

The village is also in two civil parishes, divided by the Chainley Burn. The west of the village is in Henshaw parish, while the eastern portion is in Bardon Mill parish, which also extends a long way south of the River South Tyne, as well as north of the village.

Northumberland County Council Local Elections 2021: Haydon and Hadrian
| Candidate | Political party | Total votes | % of votes |
|---|---|---|---|
| Alan Sharp | Liberal Democrats | 835 | 51.1% |
| Jan Harding | Conservative | 486 | 29.8% |
| David Clegg | Labour | 225 | 13.8% |
| Bill Day | Green | 87 | 5.3% |

== Landmarks ==
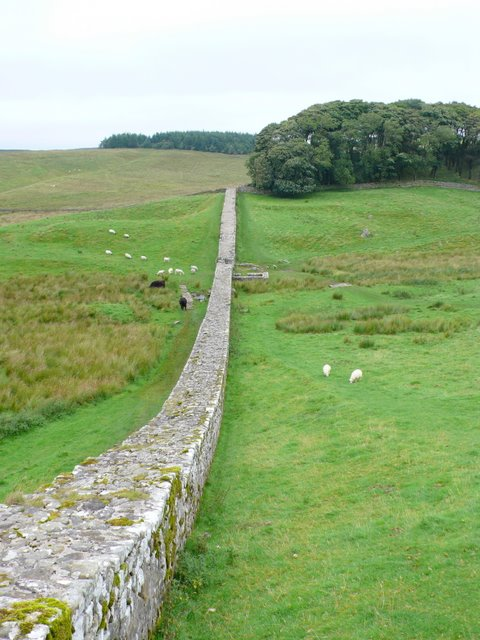
Hadrian's Wall looking east from Housesteads. The Knag Burn Gateway is visible in the distance.

A little over a mile to the south-west of the village is Willimoteswick Manor, a 16th-century fortified manor house, largely rebuilt in 1900. Just over a mile east of Bardon Mill is Ridley Hall and Allen Banks.

Ridley Hall was the ancestral home of a branch of the Bowes-Lyons, the late Queen Mother's family. Weddings and other functions are often held there including a Burns Night Ceilidh which is organised by the local church. The churches for the area are in Beltingham and Henshaw.

Allen Banks, which was formerly the estate belonging to the hall, were donated to the National Trust and includes 500 acres of riverbank and woodland walks, affording some of the best views in the area.

Northumberland National Park is located within a couple of miles of Bardon Mill. The northern end of the North Pennines is just a mile or so from here.

Vindolanda Roman settlement is in the parish just over one mile (1.5 kilometres) north of the A69. It is a world-renowned site and the location of the finding of the Vindolanda tablets – the oldest 'postcards' in the world. Some of these are to be found in the museum at Vindolanda along with a great many Roman finds from the days of the emperor Hadrian.

Hadrian's Wall is located three miles (five kilometres) north of Bardon Mill and is a World Heritage Site. Many people come from all over the world to see the Wall and the forts along it, the best preserved being Housesteads, which is located three miles (five kilometres) from the village. The Hadrian's Wall Path, covering a distance of 83 miles (134 km), as well as the Hadrian's Cycleway, both pass through the village.

== Notable residents ==
Lilian Bowes-Lyon (1895–1949), was born and grew up at Ridley Hall, near Bardon Mill. She wrote many poems about Northumberland, including Allendale Dog and Northumbrian Farm. She was a cousin of Queen Elizabeth, the Queen Mother.

== Transport ==
=== Air ===
The nearest airports are Carlisle Lake District Airport and Newcastle International Airport, which are located around 21 1/2 and 29 1/2 miles (35 and 47 km) from the village by road respectively.

=== Bus ===
The village is served by Stagecoach North East and Stagecoach Cumbria & North Lancashire's 685 bus service, which links Carlisle, Brampton and Haltwhistle with Hexham, Corbridge and Newcastle. It was previously jointly operated with Arriva North East.

=== Rail ===
The village is served by Bardon Mill station, which serves the Tyne Valley Line. Northern Trains provide 11 trains per day to Carlisle, and 13 trains per day to Hexham and Newcastle. From nearby Haltwhistle, which is located around five miles (eight kilometres) from the village, there is a more regular service provided, with two trains per hour to Carlisle, Hexham and Newcastle.

=== Road ===
The village is located near to the A69 road, which runs for 54 miles (87 km) from Carlisle to the A1 at Denton Burn.

== See also ==
- Haltwhistle
- Henshaw
- Melkridge
