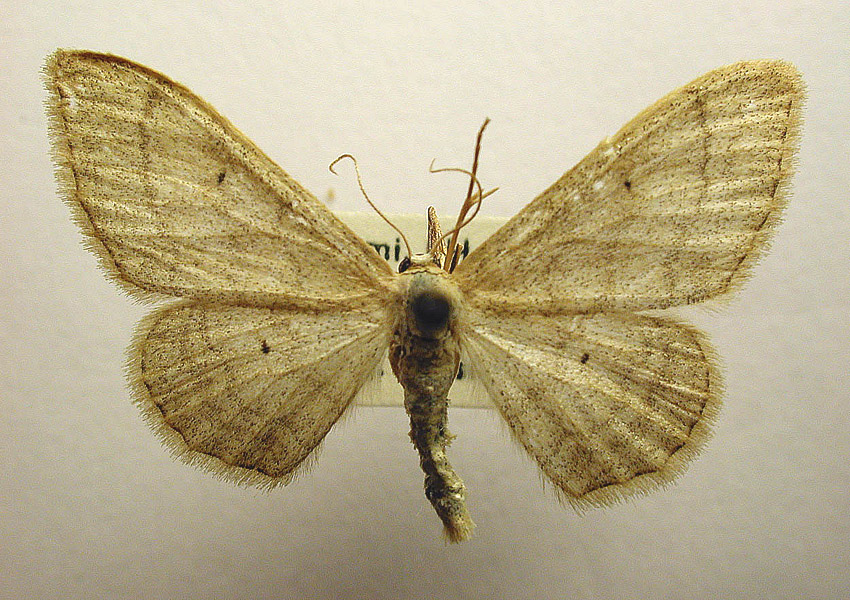

Scientific classification
- Kingdom: Animalia
- Phylum: Arthropoda
- Clade: Pancrustacea
- Class: Insecta
- Order: Lepidoptera
- Family: Geometridae
- Genus: Idaea
- Species: I. straminata

Binomial name
- Idaea straminata (Borkhausen, 1794)

= Idaea straminata =

Plain wave

Species of moth

Idaea straminata, the plain wave, is a moth of the family Geometridae. It is found in Europe including West Russia and Balkans.

The species has a wingspan of 28–33 mm. The ground colour is pale greyish ochreous with scattered black speckles. Both wings have a conspicuous though small black discal dot. The postmedian line is often rather well-developed, marked with darker dots on the veins, on the hindwing it is not only sinuate inwards between the radials and again posteriorly, but is also more or less strongly angled on the first radial; the two lines or shades which edge the subterminal are usually (especially the distal) very ill developed or wanting. On the hindwing the median shade crosses or follows the discal dot. On the under surface the forewing is a little darker, the hindwing a little whiter, the postmedian line and usually the median more strongly developed than above. The larva is slightly knotted, dark grey-brown with dark, hourglass-shaped spots on the dorsum.

The adults fly in one generation in July.

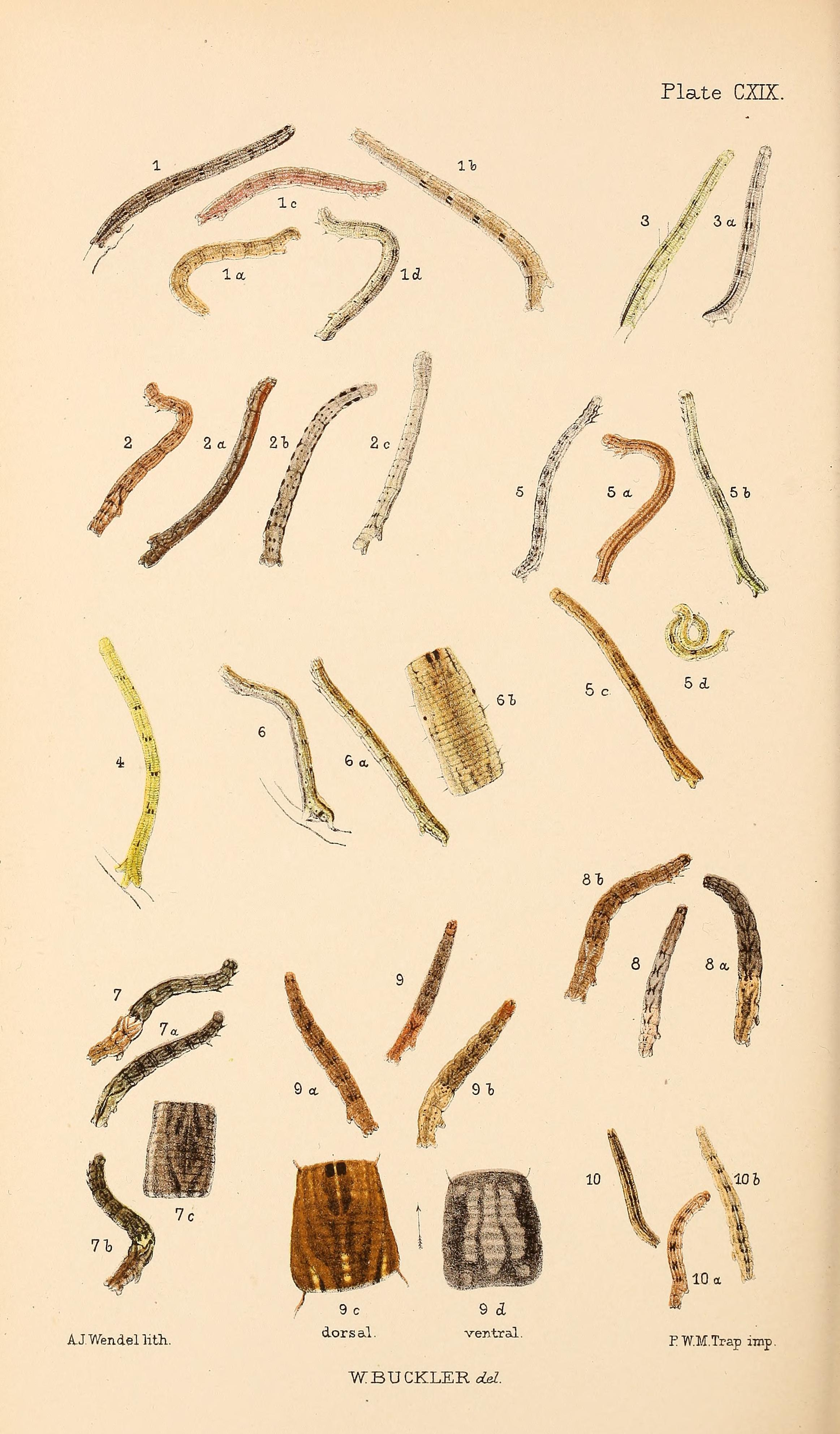
Figs8,8a,8b larvae in various stages

The larvae feed on dandelion and knotgrass.

== Notes ==
1. The flight season refers to the British Isles. This may vary in other parts of the range.
