= Bembidion monticola =

Scientific classification
- Kingdom: Animalia
- Phylum: Arthropoda
- Class: Insecta
- Order: Coleoptera
- Suborder: Adephaga
- Family: Carabidae
- Genus: Bembidion
- Species: B. monticola

Binomial name
- Bembidion monticola Sturm, 1825

Species of beetle

Bembidion monticola is a species of beetle belonging to the family Carabidae.

It is native to Europe.
