= River Allen, Northumberland =

River in Northumberland, England

River Allen
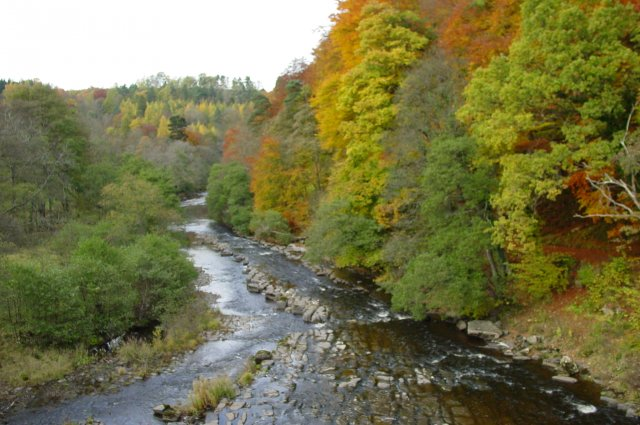
- River Allen from the Cupola Bridge; 54.926596°N 2.313870°W

- Location within Northumberland

Location
- Country: United Kingdom
- County: Northumberland

Physical characteristics
- Mouth
  - coordinates: 54.9771°N 2.3115°W
- Length: 5 miles (8 km)

Basin features
- River system: River Tyne

The River Allen is a river in the English county of Northumberland. The river has its sources in the hills of the Northern Pennines, and is formed by the confluence of the East and West Allen rivers. The Allen is a tributary of the River South Tyne, which itself, a tributary of the River Tyne. The Allen was formerly very polluted from mining activity upstream, but remediation schemes have been implemented to allow the water quality to improve.

The river is home to a variety of wildlife including voles and otters.

== History ==
The Allen, which is 5 miles (8 km) long, is a tributary of the River South Tyne. Whilst the derivation of the river name itself is unknown, it gives its name to Allendale and Allenheads. The river is classed as the Allen from a place called Water Meetings, which is just south of Cupola Bridge, a grade II listed structure built in 1778. Upstream of there, the water is formed by the River West Allen and the River East Allen, which are 5.6 miles (9 km) and 14 miles (22 km) respectively.

Allen Valley Angling and Conservation provides permits to fish the River East Allen and supports conservation efforts to improve fish stock and riverside access. The river is home to wild brown trout and visiting spawning sea trout, salmon and otters. Conservation work in 2010 including the removal of weirs that were no longer necessary and the introduction of fish passes to allow the fish further upstream than has been possible since Victorian times. In 2017, voles were released in the upper catchment.

The riverside is noted for its broadleaved woodland and walks through the gorges and valleys that the river flows through. Allen Banks and Staward Gorge is upstream on this river from the confluence with the Tyne. The gorge is evidence of ice streams escaping during the Devensian period, which carved their way through the limestone.

During the winter of 2015/2016, Storm Desmond affected the river with severe flooding, which led to the woodland alongside the river being closed to the public. However, this in turn meant that more wildlife was noted around the river, including red squirrels, roe deer and more otters.

The river has been subjected to pollution from mining activity in the Northern Pennine Orefield; both rivers have had mining activity close to them, with Allen Smelt Mill being located on the south bank of the East Allen. However, further downstream on the River Tyne, the metalliferous pollution has promoted certain types of grasses to grow which thrive on lead and zinc ores in the water.

== Catchment and hydrometry ==
The main river drains an area of 8.1 square miles (21 km^{2}), but with the addition of the West and East Allen rivers, the total area is 50 square miles (130 km^{2}). The water quality ranges from moderate to poor on account of previous mining activity. Due to the amount of water that can be drained into the river, the steep nature of the valley walls and the "impervious geology" of the underlying rock, the river is noted to be a problem for flash flooding, which can lead to inundation problems downstream.

Whilst there no gauging stations on the River Allen, there is one on the East Allen near Allendale. The normal range for the river there is between 7.1 inches (0.18 m) and 1 foot 8 inches (0.52 m) in normal weather conditions. The highest level recorded was in November 2000, when the peak flow was measured at 6 feet 5 inches (1.95 m).

== Tributaries ==
- Linn Burn (r)
- Hood's Burn (l)
- Kingswood Burn (l)
- Harsondale Burn (r)
- Front Burn (l)
- River West Allen (l) - source
- River East Allen (r) - source

== See also ==
- Allen Confluence Gravels SSSI
- Briarwood Banks SSSI
