= Allen Banks & Staward Gorge =

Victorian garden and National Trust property in Northumberland, England

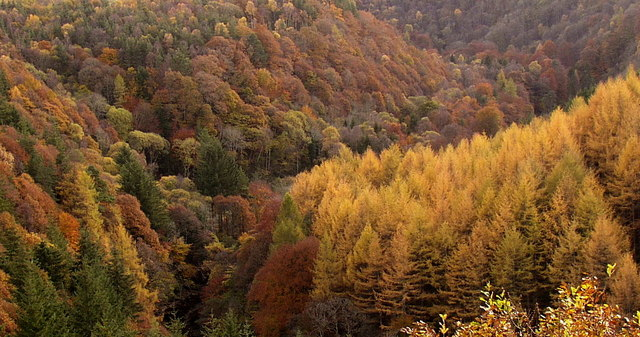
- Staward Gorge from Staward Peel

- Location in Northumberland
- 54.962°N 2.316°W
- Location: Northumberland, England, UK
- OS grid reference: NY798630

Allen Banks & Staward Gorge is a 194-acre National Trust property in the English county of Northumberland.

It is a Victorian garden in a gorge of the River Allen cutting through woodland. The ruins of Staward Peel, a medieval peel tower, stand on a promontory above the gorge. The property has been designated a Site of Special Scientific Interest for its rich flora and fauna. There is a large suspension bridge which has been ruined by the flooding of January 2005.
