= Milecastle 11 =

Milecastle of Hadrian's Wall

- Tyne and Wear, England, UK
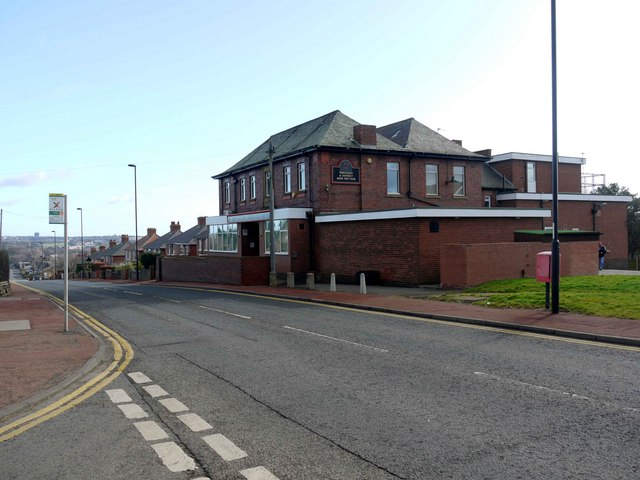
- Throckley Bank Top Club – the presumed site of the milecastle

Location
- Location in Tyne and Wear
- Coordinates: 54.996142°N 1.767306°W
- Grid reference: NZ14986686

Milecastle 11 (Throckley Bank Top) was a milecastle of the Roman Hadrian's Wall. No remains exist, but the measured position is the middle of the old village of Throckley Bank Top, under the Working Men's Club.

== Construction ==
Nothing is known of the construction of Milecastle 11. The curtain wall at this point is known to have been 2.59 metres (8.5 ft) thick with a clay core.

== Excavations and investigations ==
- 1858 – Henry MacLauchlan surveyed the area, and discovered what he assumed to be the milecastle.
- 1879 – A coin hoard of over 5000 silvered coins (dated 244 AD to 275 AD) in a pot was discovered at a point slightly north of the currently assumed milecastle position (just behind the wall).
- 1928 – Maclauchlan's find is identified as an old pit heap. Trenching in the measured site of the milecastle is unsuccessful.
- 1929 – Further unsuccessful investigation.
- 1959 – Further unsuccessful trenches by Miss Phillips in the area of demolished miners' cottages.
- 1990 – English Heritage's Central Excavation Unit observed a 0.5 m deep cable trench cut through the site, without result.
- 2002 – A metalled surface on two levels was discovered slightly north of the presumed milecastle position. From a point just east of the milecastle, as far as Turret 11B, 145 pits were discovered along the berm. Some retained the impression of two upright stakes.

== Associated turrets ==
Each milecastle on Hadrian's Wall had two associated turret structures. These turrets were positioned approximately one-third and two-thirds of a Roman mile to the west of the Milecastle, and would probably have been manned by part of the milecastle's garrison. The turrets associated with Milecastle 11 are known as Turret 11A and Turret 11B.

=== Turret 11A ===
Investigation in 1928 failed to find Turret 11A (Heddon Hall).

Presumed location: 54.996605°N 1.774228°W

=== Turret 11B ===
Turret 11B (Great Hill) was located just to the east of the summit of Great Hill. No masonry remains, but the location was confirmed in 1919 by the discovery of pottery and occupation earth.

Location on Ordnance Survey 1:25 000 map: 54.996404°N 1.782154°W

== Monument records ==
Monument	Monument Number	English Heritage Archive Number
Milecastle 11	22684	NZ 16 NE 11
Turret 11A	22769	NZ 16 NW 1
Turret 11B	22772	NZ 16 NW 2

== Bibliography ==
- Daniels, Charles (1979), "Review: Fact and Theory on Hadrian's Wall", Britannia, 10: 357–364, JSTOR 526069
