= Milefortlet 25 =

Roman coastal fort in Cumbria, England

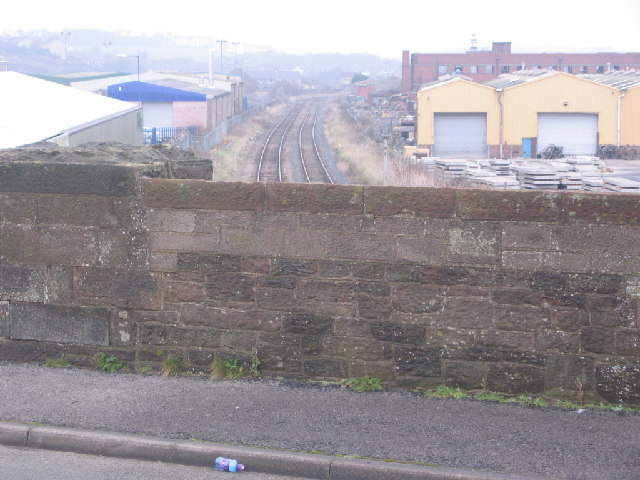
- Milefortlet 25 lies under the industrial area of Maryport

- Location within the former Allerdale Borough Location within Cumbria
- 54.704629°N 3.508029°W
- Type: Milecastle
- Location: Cumbria, England

Milefortlet 25 was a Milefortlet of the Roman Cumbrian Coast defences. These milefortlets and intervening stone watchtowers extended from the western end of Hadrian's Wall, along the Cumbrian coast and were linked by a wooden palisade. They were contemporary with defensive structures on Hadrian's Wall. Milefortlet 25 is the southernmost known of the fortlets of the Cumberland coast, but there is nothing to see on the ground, as Milefortlet 25 lies in an industrial area of Maryport.

== Description ==
Milefortlet 25 is in the southern part of the town of Maryport near a modern industrial zone. There are no visible remains and the area is built upon. The fortlet is about 2 kilometers southwest of the Roman fort of Alauna.

At one time this fortlet was known as Milefortlet 26, on the assumption that there had been a dislocation of the pattern of fortlets and towers due to the presence of the Alauna fort. Archaeologist Richard Bellhouse proposed that Towers 23B and 24A were the same as two of the fort's angle-towers. This meant that he suppressed Milefortlet 24 and numbered the two fortlets south of Alauna as Milefortlets 25 and 26. Archaeologists no longer accept this break in the sequence, and this final fortlet is now known as Milefortlet 25.

== Associated Towers ==
Each milefortlet had two associated towers, similar in construction to the turrets built along Hadrian's Wall. These towers were positioned approximately one-third and two-thirds of a Roman mile to the west of the Milefortlet, and would probably have been manned by part of the nearest Milefortlet's garrison. The towers associated with Milefortlet 25 are known as Tower 25A (grid reference NY02683501) and Tower 25B (grid reference NY02553451).

Tower 25A is situated near the cliff edge at the summit of Rise How Bank. It was excavated in 1969 and again in 1981/82 by Richard Bellhouse. It was his predicted position for Milefortlet 26, but the excavations showed that the structure was a tower (Tower 26A in Bellhouse's system). The tower was 6 metres square with stone walls nearly 1 metre wide. The buried remains included a pre-Roman burial mound, and an early-medieval grain drying kiln constructed within the abandoned tower.

The foundations of Tower 25B were discovered in 1880 during the building of a coke oven. The building measured 4 metres square (internally), with walls around 1 metre wide. There was a clay covered cobbled floor, on which pottery fragments were found. The site now lies beneath a reclaimed coal tip which is grassed over. The tower is the final one known in the Cumbrian frontier system.
