= Milecastle 63 =

Milecastle on Hadrian's Wall in Cumbria, England

- Location within Cumbria
- 54.929043°N 2.888591°W
- Type: Milecastle
- Location: Cumbria, England

Milecastle 63 (Walby West) was a milecastle on Hadrian's Wall (grid reference NY43155973).

== Description ==
Milecastle 63 is about 800 metres southwest of the hamlet of Walby in the civil parish of Stanwix Rural. There are no visible remains.

A geophysical survey in 1980 identified remains close to this spot (grid reference NY43155974) which were thought to be that of the milecastle. However evaluation work conducted in 2000 found a section of Hadrian's Wall at this location, and it is now believed that Milecastle 63 lies under the track in the field immediately to the south of the wall.

== Associated turrets ==
Each milecastle on Hadrian's Wall had two associated turret structures. These turrets were positioned approximately one-third and two-thirds of a Roman mile to the west of the Milecastle, and would probably have been manned by part of the milecastle's garrison. The turrets associated with 'Milecastle 63 are known as Turret 63A (grid reference NY428593) and Turret 63B (grid reference NY422590). None of the turrets between Milecastles 59 and 72 were sought or identified prior to 1961, and the exact locations of turrets 63A and 63B have not been found.
