= Milecastle 67 =

Milecastle on Hadrian's Wall

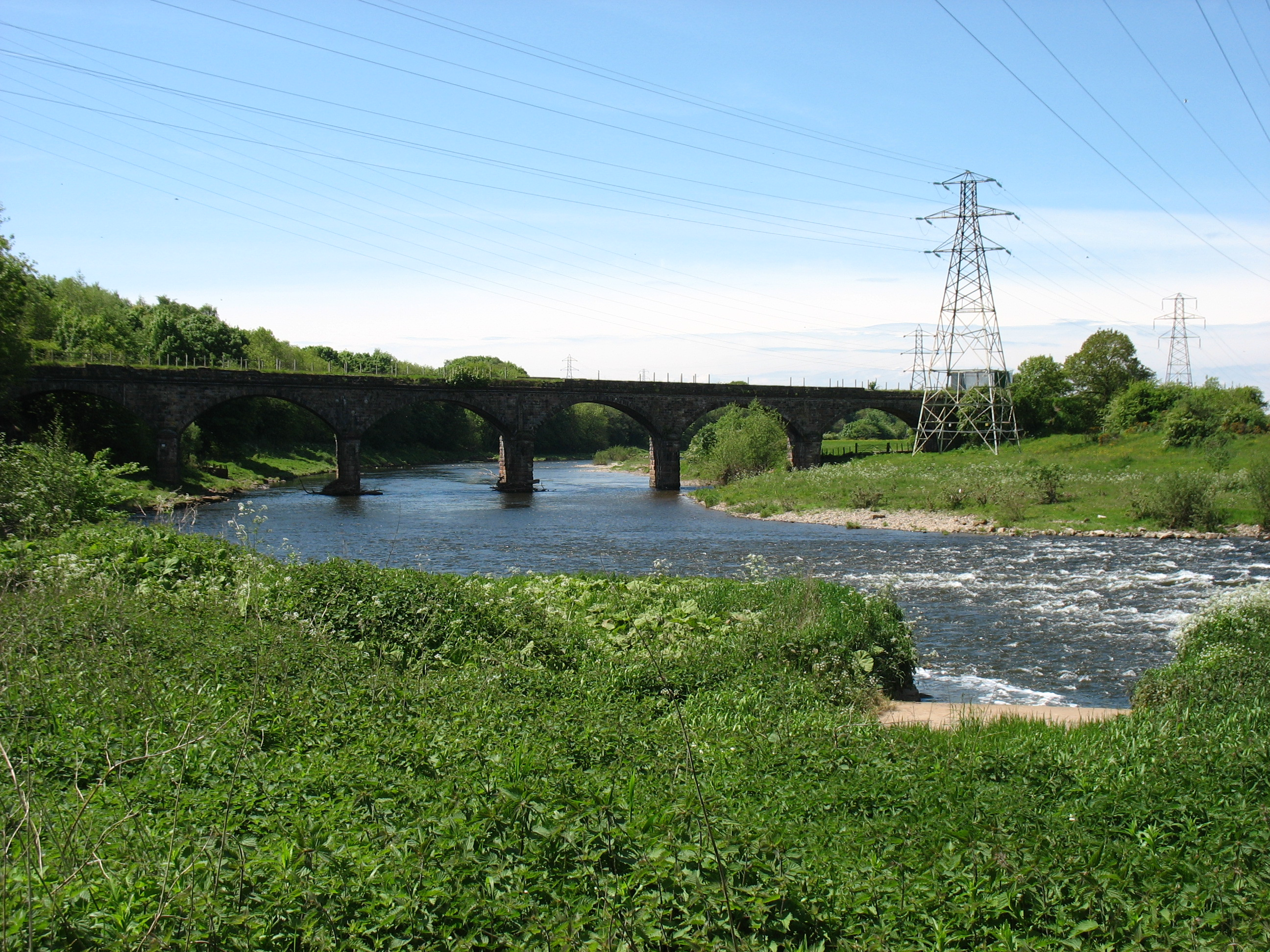
- View towards the Waverley Viaduct and the approximate site of Milecastle 67

- Location within Cumbria
- 54.898802°N 2.965269°W
- Type: Milecastle
- Location: Cumbria, England

Milecastle 67 (Stainton) is a conjectured milecastle of the Roman Hadrian's Wall. The site of the milecastle has been calculated from measurement to known milecastle sites, but no remains providing proof of its existence have been identified, though Roman coins were found in 1861, during the digging of the adjacent railway cutting.

== Excavations and investigations ==
- 1861 – Roman coins found during railway cutting construction.

== Associated turrets ==
Each milecastle on Hadrian's Wall had two associated turret structures. These turrets were positioned approximately one-third and two-thirds of a Roman mile to the west of the Milecastle, and would probably have been manned by part of the milecastle's garrison. The turrets associated with Milecastle 67 are known as Turret 67A (grid reference NY377565) and Turret 67B (grid reference NY373567), though no evidence of either has been identified.

== Monument records ==
Monument	Monument Number	National Monuments Record Number
Milecastle 67	10566	NY 35 NE 2

== Bibliography ==
- Daniels, Charles (1979), "Review: Fact and Theory on Hadrian's Wall", Britannia, 10: 357–364, doi:10.2307/526069, JSTOR 526069
