= Milecastle 8 =

Milecastle on Hadrian's Wall in England

- Tyne and Wear, England, UK
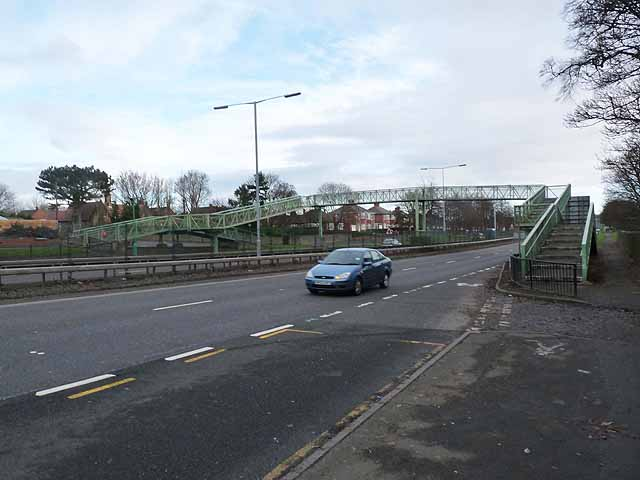
- Milecastle 8 lies under the A69 road

Location
- Location in Tyne and Wear
- Coordinates: 54.986472°N 1.70064°W
- Grid reference: NZ19256580

Milecastle 8 (West Denton) was a milecastle of the Roman Hadrian's Wall. Its remains are located in West Denton, Newcastle upon Tyne. The milecastle has two associated turret structures that are known as turret 8A and turret 8B. The turrets and milecastle were excavated in the 1920s, yielding some pottery and stone carvings, and have since been overlain by modern roads. The exact location of the structures is disputed, with the road hiding any surface traces. The Milecastle forms part of the Hadrian's Wall World Heritage Site.

== Construction ==
There is some dispute over the exact location, with one study in 1929 locating it 1,627 yards (1,488 m) east of Milecastle 9, and historian Madeleine Hope Dodds stating in 1930 that it is 1,602 yards (1,465 m) from Milecastle 9. The Ordnance Survey uses an average of these positions on its mapping. The site of Milecastle 8 is buried beneath the A69 dual carriageway.

== Excavations and investigations ==
The milecastle was excavated in 1928, when it was located on a natural hillock. Excavations uncovered pottery and other relics but no structural remains of the milecastle were uncovered. It is possible that the remains of the milecastle had been removed by stone-robbers.

Excavations near the site have uncovered two carved stone "Celtic heads", possibly representative of local Celtic religions or imported from Europe with a unit of auxilia. The heads were discovered in 1969 and 1980.

== Associated turrets ==
Each milecastle on Hadrian's Wall has two associated turret structures. These turrets were positioned approximately one third of a Roman mile apart and would have been manned by part of the milecastle's garrison. The turrets associated with Milecastle 8 are known as turrets 8A and 8B.

=== Turret 8A ===
Turret 8A (West Denton) was located in 1929 based on pottery and occupation earth finds to a position 522 yards (477 m) west of Milecastle 8, beneath a modern road, and there are no visible remains. However, the field reports disagree with the position of 8A given by Madeleine Hope Dodds, and a separate position is given by the Ordnance Survey. The turret is located underneath the modern A69 road in this area.

Ordnance Survey location: 54.987926°N 1.707661°W

=== Turret 8B ===
Turret 8B (Union Hall) was investigated in 1929 and positioned 532 yards (486 m) west which places it 548 yards (501 m) east of Milecastle 9, although sources of the period disagree on this point. When it was excavated the road of the time ran alongside the turret, and the south wall, 19 feet 10 inches (6.05 m) long with a doorway set in it, was found to be two courses of stone high. The road was later realigned and lies over the site, leaving no visible surface trace of the turret. The turret is located underneath the modern A69 road in this area.

Ordnance Survey location: 54.989291°N 1.714684°W

== Monument records ==
| Monument | Monument Number | Historic England Archive Number |
|---|---|---|
| Milecastle 8 | 22653 | NZ 16 NE 2 |
| Turret 8A | 22656 | NZ 16 NE 3 |
| Turret 8B | 22659 | NZ 16 NE 4 |
