= Milecastle 79 =

Fortlet on Hadrian's Wall in England

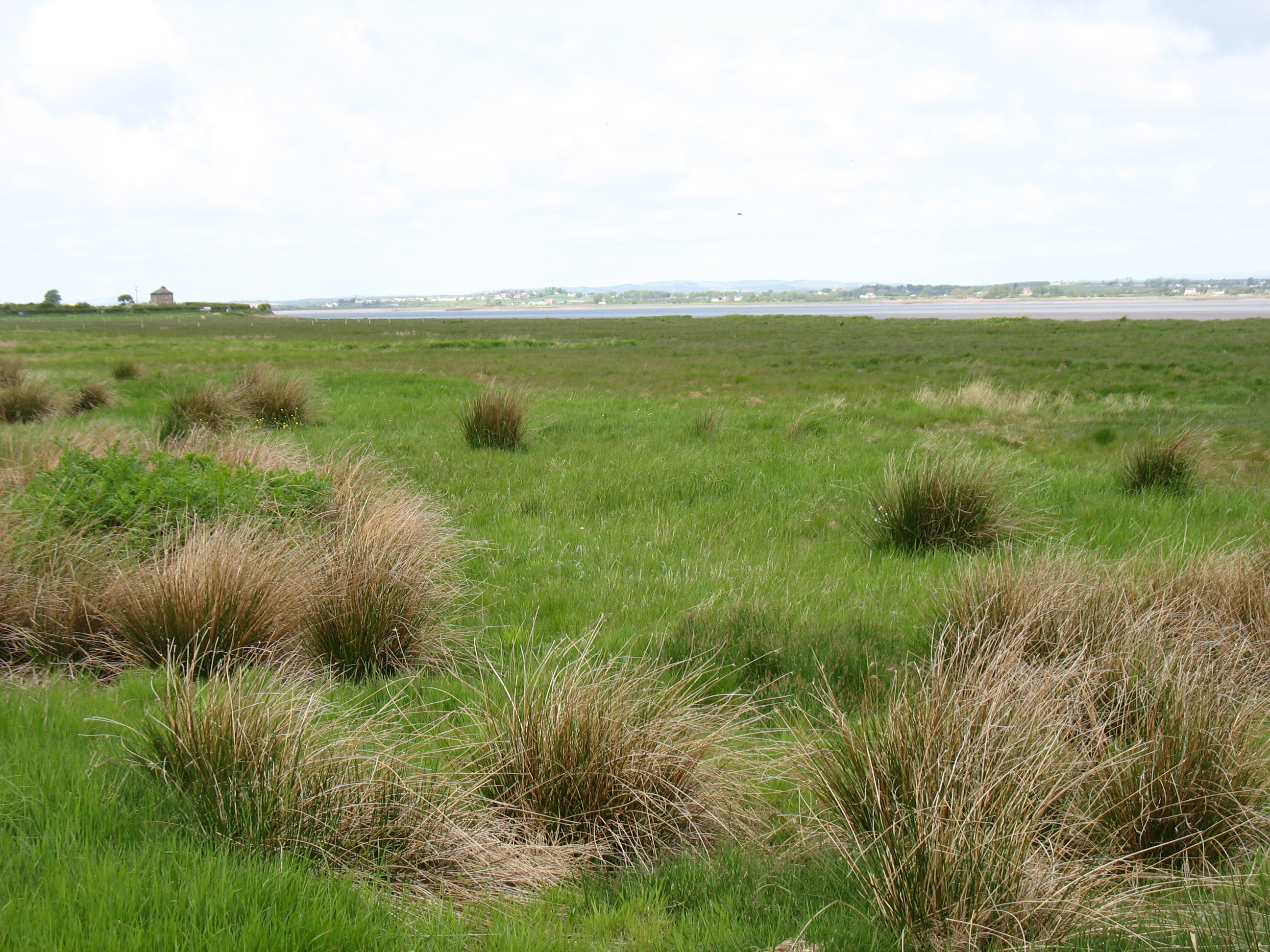
- View towards the Solway Firth near the site of Milecastle 79

- Location within Cumbria
- 54.948979°N 3.194427°W
- Type: Milecastle
- Location: Cumbria, England

Milecastle 79 (Solway House) was one of a series of Milecastles or small fortlets built at intervals of approximately one Roman mile along Hadrian's Wall (grid reference NY23596224).

== Description ==
Milecastle 79 is 350 metres west of Field View Lane, to the west of the village of Port Carlisle. The site is on slightly raised ground, but there is no surface trace of the milecastle.

When the antiquarian William Hutton walked the length of Hadrian's Wall in 1801 this area was the only place west of the city of Carlisle in which he says that he saw Hadrian's Wall. He describes it as "five or six hundred yards long, and three feet high ... in two places it is six feet high, eight broad, and three thick; but has no facing-stones". Hutton encountered a farmer who boasted how he had destroyed parts of the Wall, but Hutton extracted a promise from him not to disturb any remaining parts of the Wall.

== Excavations ==
Excavations of Milecastle 79 were conducted in 1949. It was originally a turf and timber milecastle built for the Turf Wall. It measured 14.9 metres east to west and 12.5 metres north to south internally. The area around the milecastle is subject to flooding, which may explain the 1.5 metre high artificial platform on which the milecastle was built. The milecastle was replaced in the later 2nd century by a stone milecastle which measured 17.7 metres square internally. The gates of the stone milecastle were reduced in size after the initial construction. A timber-framed building stood in the eastern half of the stone milecastle.

This milecastle was excavated again in 1999 as part of the Milecastles Project. The excavations uncovered the remains of both the turf and stone milecastles, and detected the timber building that occupied the east side of the milecastle. The results indicated that the 1949 excavations were largely accurate.

== Associated turrets ==
Each milecastle on Hadrian's Wall had two associated turret structures. These turrets were positioned approximately one-third and two-thirds of a Roman mile to the west of the Milecastle, and would probably have been manned by part of the milecastle's garrison. The turrets associated with Milecastle 79 are known as Turret 79A and Turret 79B.

Turret 79A (grid reference NY23196229) has never been located, and its approximate position has been calculated in relation to the known position of neighbouring wall structures. It is thought to be located approximately 400 metres west of Milecastle 79 where the route of Hadrian's Wall changes direction. Hadrian's Wall itself is visible at this location as an irregular bank up to 14 metres wide and up to 1 metre high at the bend.

Turret 79B (Jeffrey Croft) (grid reference NY22836256) is situated about 250 metres southeast of the houses at the east end of Bowness-on-Solway in the field known as Jeffrey Croft. Its site is indicated by a very slight platform, visible on the ground. It was partially excavated in 1934. The excavations found the south and west walls of the turret. It was originally built as a free-standing stone tower abutting the Turf Wall. It is the most westerly turret known on Hadrian's Wall.
