= Milecastle 46 =

Roman fortification in England

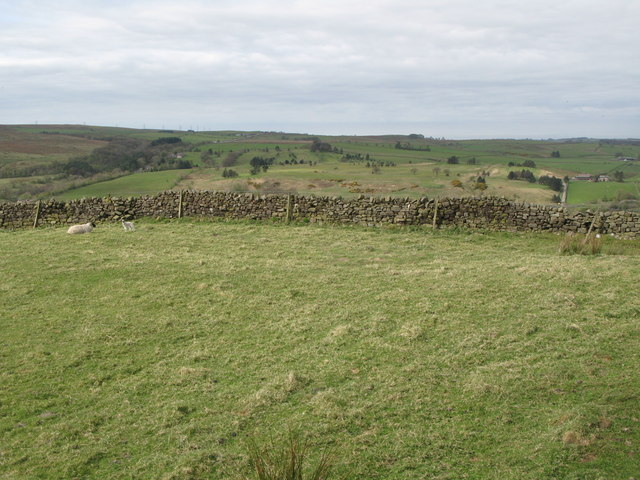
- The site of Milecastle 46

- Location within Northumberland
- 54.98759°N 2.5256°W
- Type: Milecastle
- Location: Northumberland, England

Milecastle 46 (Carvoran) was a milecastle on Hadrian's Wall (grid reference NY66466601).

== Description ==
Milecastle 46 is just west of the Vallum deviation, north of Carvoran Roman Fort (Magnis). There are no visible remains of the milecastle, but its site can be distinguished by a slight, turf-covered platform. The site is visible as earthworks on aerial photographs.

== Associated turrets ==
Each milecastle on Hadrian's Wall had two associated turret structures. These turrets were positioned approximately one-third and two-thirds of a Roman mile to the west of the Milecastle, and would probably have been manned by part of the milecastle's garrison. The turrets associated with Milecastle 46 are known as Turret 46A and Turret 46B.

=== Turret 46A ===
Turret 46A (Holmhead) (grid reference NY659660) has never been located, and its position has been calculated from the neighbouring milecastles. It may lie under the house or garden of Holmhead.

=== Turret 46B ===
Turret 46B (Wallend) (grid reference NY65426603) has never been located, and its position has been calculated from the neighbouring milecastles. It may lie under a farm outbuilding.

== Public access ==
The site of the milecastle is on private land directly adjacent to the Hadrian's Wall Path. Parking is available at Walltown Quarry Car Park, which is on the line of the Hadrian's Wall Path, and is signposted from the B6318 (Military Road).
