= Milecastle 55 =

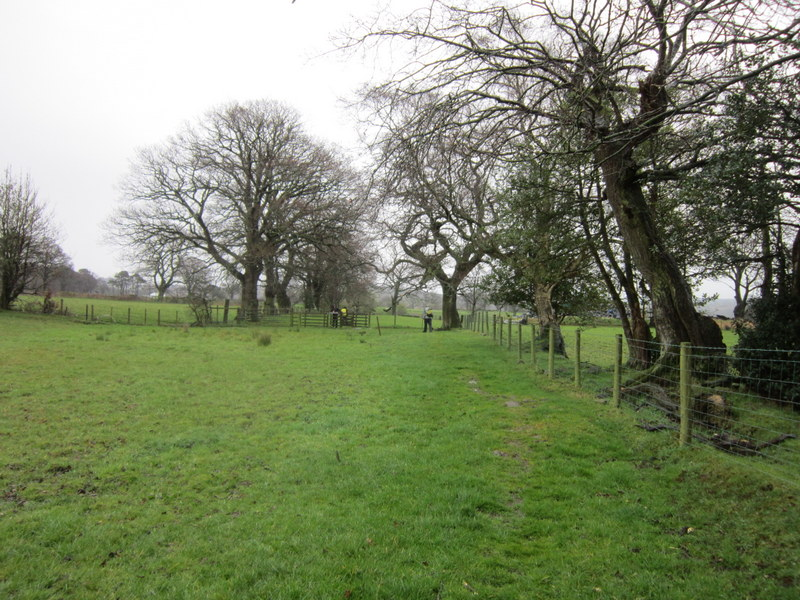
- Hadrian's Wall Path in the vicinity of Milecastle 55

- Location within Cumbria
- 54.971818°N 2.726444°W
- Type: Milecastle
- Location: Cumbria, England

Milecastle 55 (Low Wall) was a milecastle on Hadrian's Wall (grid reference NY53596437).

== Description ==
Milecastle 55 is in a pasture field east of the village of Walton, Cumbria. There is no surface trace of the milecastle, except a low turf platform visible as a slight rise in the hedgeline. It measures 22 metres east to west but its north-south length is uncertain because its extent to the south is unclear.

Hadrian's Wall in the vicinity of Milecastle 55 survives as a substantial turf covered bank, up to 1.4 metres high, surmounted by a fence and hedge.

== Excavations ==
Milecastle 55 was located and partly excavated in 1900. The excavation yielded some late 4th century pottery.

== Associated turrets ==
Each milecastle on Hadrian's Wall had two associated turret structures. These turrets were positioned approximately one-third and two-thirds of a Roman mile to the west of the Milecastle, and would probably have been manned by part of the milecastle's garrison. The turrets associated with Milecastle 55 are known as Turret 55A and Turret 55B.

=== Turret 55A ===
Turret 55A (Dovecote) (grid reference NY53106436) was located in 1933. It is situated about 170 metres to the north of High Dovecote. There is no surface trace of the turret visible.

=== Turret 55B ===
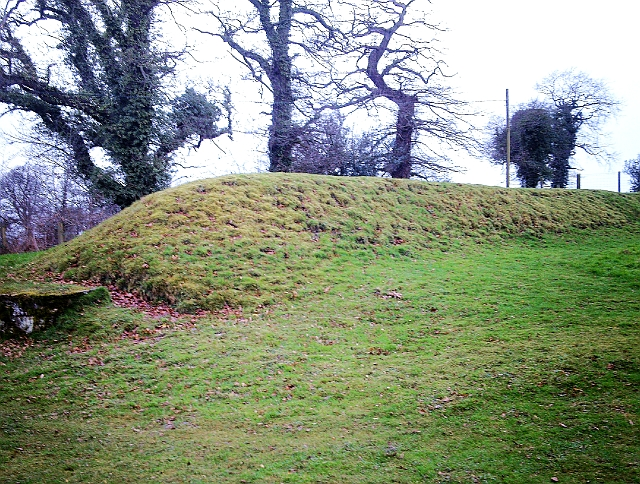
Hadrian's Wall in the vicinity of Turret 55B

Turret 55B (Townhead Croft) (grid reference NY52666433) was located in 1959 following a failed attempt to find it in 1933. It is situated about 40 metres west of Dovecote Bridge. There is no surface trace of the turret visible.

A section of Hadrian's Wall, 1 metre high and 20 metres long, can be seen close to the site of Turret 55B near Dovecote Bridge. It is currently covered by a protective mound of earth to preserve the fragile stonework.
