= Milecastle 77 =

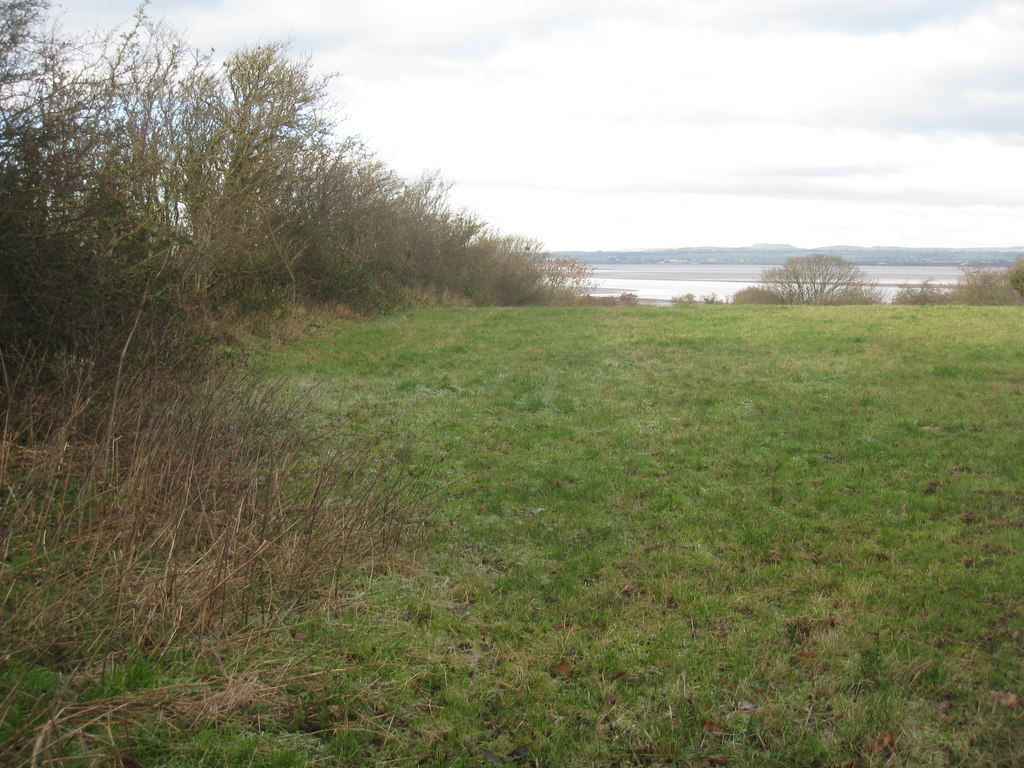
- View towards the Solway Firth near the site of Milecastle 77

- Location within Cumbria
- 54.935277°N 3.161712°W
- Type: Milecastle
- Location: Cumbria, England

Milecastle 77 (Raven Bank) was one of a series of Milecastles or small fortlets built at intervals of approximately one Roman mile along Hadrian's Wall (grid reference NY25666068).

== Description ==
Milecastle 77 is thought to lie northeast of the village of Glasson. The exact location has not been found. The area was excavated in 1973, but the results were inconclusive. It is thought to be situated about 50 metres south of the junction of the Glasson road with the Bowness-Carlisle road.

The vallum survives as a feature visible on the ground to the southwest of the milecastle.

== Associated turrets ==
Each milecastle on Hadrian's Wall had two associated turret structures. These turrets were positioned approximately one-third and two-thirds of a Roman mile to the west of the Milecastle, and would probably have been manned by part of the milecastle's garrison. The turrets associated with Milecastle 77 are known as Turret 77A (grid reference NY255611) and Turret 77B (grid reference NY251612). The exact locations of the turrets have not been found.
