= Milecastle 73 =

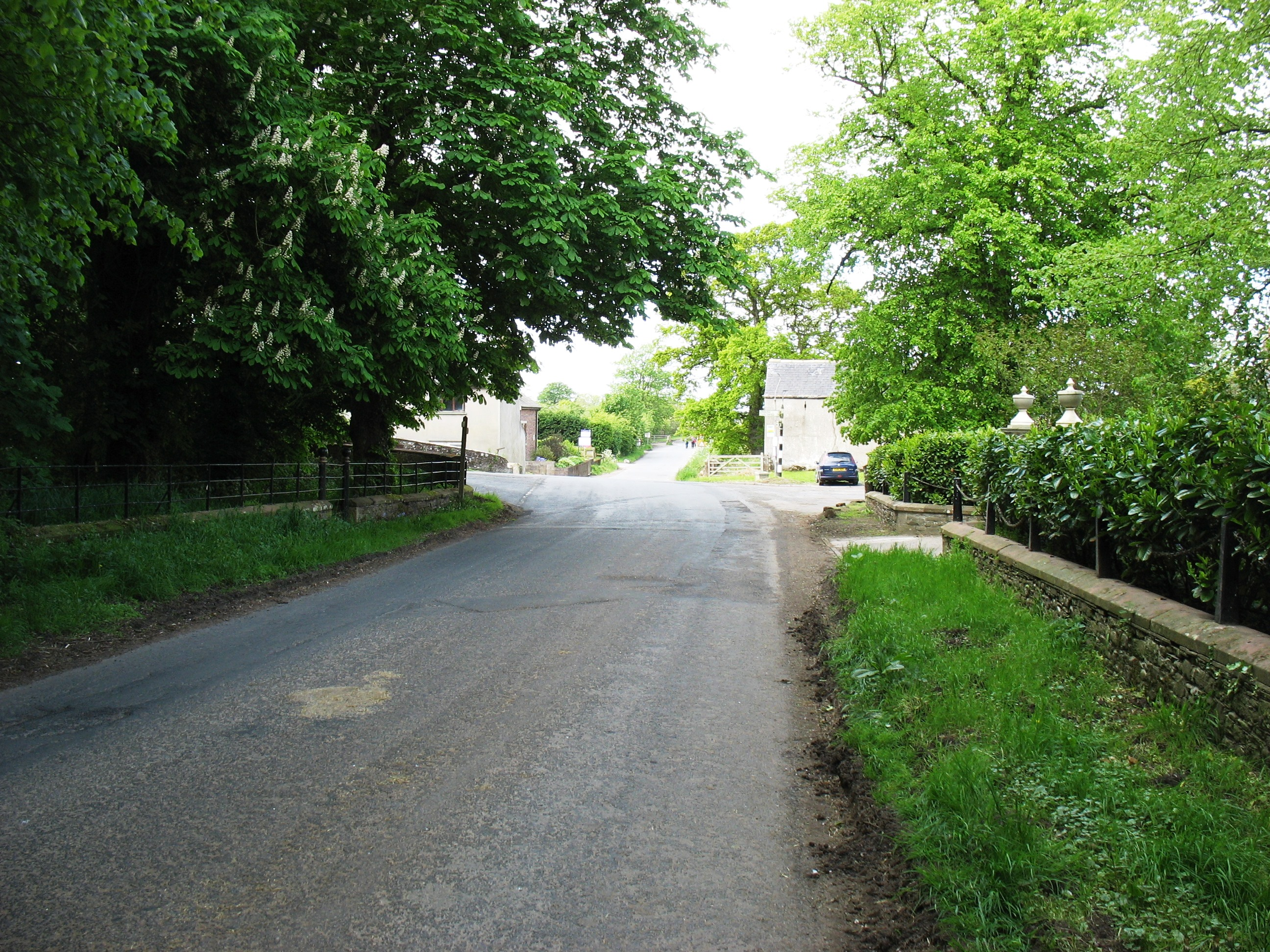
- Milecastle 73 lies north of the road leading west out of Burgh by Sands

- Location within the former City of Carlisle district Location within Cumbria
- 54.924271°N 3.078538°W
- Type: Milecastle
- Location: Cumbria, England

Milecastle 73 (Dykesfield) was one of a series of Milecastles or small fortlets built at intervals of approximately one Roman mile along Hadrian's Wall (grid reference NY30975937).

== Description ==
Milecastle 73 is about a mile west of the village of Burgh by Sands. There are no visible remains above ground.

Milecastle 73 was located and partially excavated in 1948. It measured 19.2 metres north-south by 18.7 metres east-west internally. The walls were 2 metres thick.

The milecastle was located again in a geophysical survey. It measured 24.75 metres north-south and 26 metres east-west externally. The survey identified a possible road at the milecastle, and two neighbouring enclosures built onto each of the east and west walls of the milecastle, with a further one built to the west of the western enclosure. Some evidence of buildings and divisions were seen in both western enclosures.

== Associated turrets ==
Each milecastle on Hadrian's Wall had two associated turret structures. These turrets were positioned approximately one-third and two-thirds of a Roman mile to the west of the Milecastle, and would probably have been manned by part of the milecastle's garrison. The turrets associated with Milecastle 73 are known as Turret 73A (grid reference NY30505952) and Turret 73B (grid reference NY30025961). The exact locations of the turrets have not been found. Both sites fall within Burgh Marsh where there is no evidence for any Wall structures.
