= Milecastle 68 =

Milecastle on Hadrian's Wall

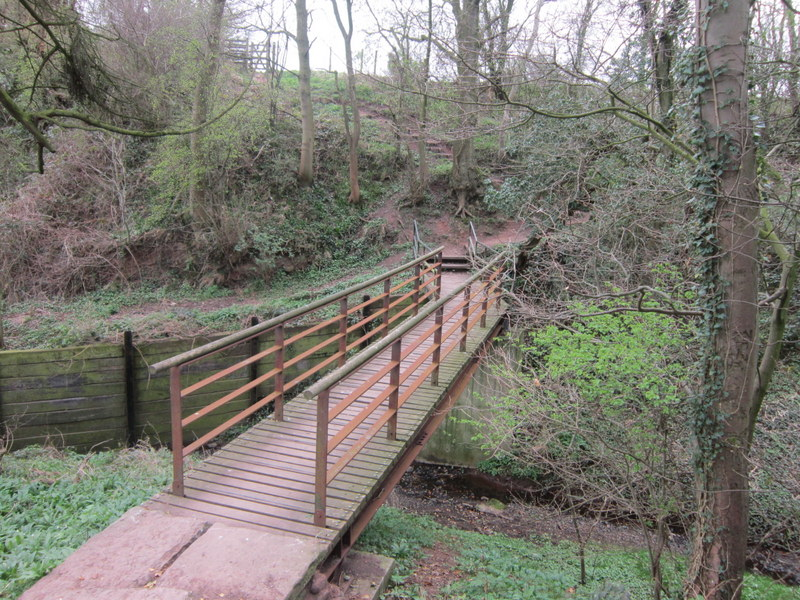
- The footbridge over Boomby Gill

- Location within Cumbria
- 54.904240°N 2.970858°W
- Type: Milecastle
- Location: Cumbria, England

Milecastle 68 (Boomby Gill) is a conjectured milecastle of the Roman Hadrian's Wall. The site of the milecastle (adjacent to Boomby Gill) has been calculated from measurement to known milecastle sites, but no remains providing proof of its existence have been identified.

== Excavations and investigations ==
- 1969 – English Heritage Field Investigation. It was noted that no visible remains existed.
- 1972 – English Heritage Field Investigation. An old excavation trench was noted at grid reference NY37095717. The Field Investigator speculated that it could have been opened in an attempt to find the north-west angle of the milecastle, but without apparent success. The trench had, however revealed many undressed stones, some large.
- 1990 – Hadrian's Wall Project Field Investigation. It was noted that no visible remains existed, and no trace of the trench noted by the previous Field Investigator could be identified.

== Associated turrets ==
Each milecastle on Hadrian's Wall had two associated turret structures. These turrets were positioned approximately one-third and two-thirds of a Roman mile to the west of the Milecastle, and would probably have been manned by part of the milecastle's garrison. The turrets associated with Milecastle 68 are known as Turret 68A (grid reference NY369575) and Turret 68B (grid reference NY368579), though no evidence of either has been identified.

== Monument records ==
Monument	Monument Number	National Monuments Record Number
Milecastle 68	10588	NY 35 NE 14

== Bibliography ==
- Daniels, Charles (1979), "Review: Fact and Theory on Hadrian's Wall", Britannia, 10: 357–364, doi:10.2307/526069, JSTOR 526069
