= Milecastle 64 =

Milecastle on Hadrian's Wall in England

- Location within Cumbria
- 54.919989°N 2.909922°W
- Type: Milecastle
- Location: Cumbria, England

Milecastle 64 (Drawdykes) was a milecastle on Hadrian's Wall (grid reference NY41775874).

== Description ==
Milecastle 64 is 100 metres west of Brunstock Beck on the waste ground of a former army camp. The M6 motorway passes by just to the east. There are no visible remains of the milecastle.

== Excavations ==
Milecastle 64 was located and excavated in 1962. It was found to be a short axis milecastle, and measured internally 17.8 metres by 14.6 metres. The walls had been extensively robbed of stone. The north gateway, which was 3 metres wide, had been blocked at some stage. A cobbled road 5 metres wide ran through the centre of the milecastle.

A section of a Roman milestone was found on the west side of the milecastle in the 1962 excavations. It is inscribed with the letters "MP". The milestone is in Carlisle Museum.

== Associated turrets ==
Each milecastle on Hadrian's Wall had two associated turret structures. These turrets were positioned approximately one-third and two-thirds of a Roman mile to the west of the Milecastle, and would probably have been manned by part of the milecastle's garrison. The turrets associated with Milecastle 64 are known as Turret 64A (grid reference NY414585) and Turret 64B (grid reference NY411582). None of the turrets between Milecastles 59 and 72 were sought or identified before 1961, and the exact locations of turrets 64A and 64B have not been found.
