= Milecastle 74 =

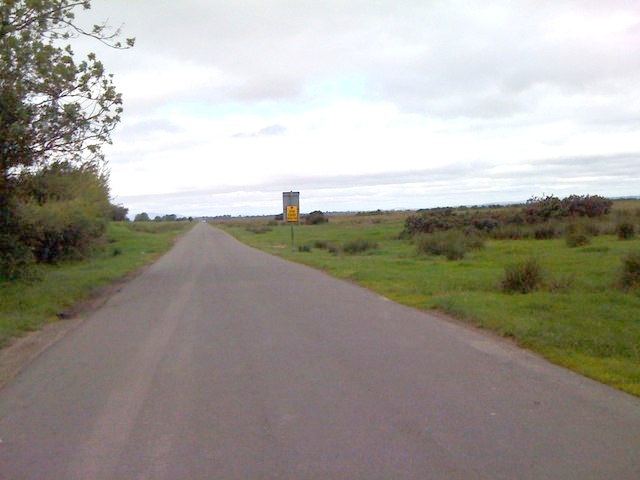
- Milecastle 74 lies near the road from Burgh by Sands to Drumburgh

- Location within the former City of Carlisle district Location within Cumbria
- 54.92659°N 3.100446°W
- Type: Milecastle
- Location: Cumbria, England

Milecastle 74 (Burgh Marsh) was one of a series of milecastles or small fortlets built at intervals of approximately one Roman mile along Hadrian's Wall (grid reference NY29575965).

== Description ==
Milecastle 74 is thought to lie near the road leading from Burgh by Sands to Drumburgh. The milecastle has never been found, and its position has been estimated in reference to neighbouring wall structures. The site falls within Burgh Marsh where there are no known remains of Hadrian's Wall.

== Associated turrets ==
Each milecastle on Hadrian's Wall had two associated turret structures. These turrets were positioned approximately one-third and two-thirds of a Roman mile to the west of the Milecastle, and would probably have been manned by part of the milecastle's garrison. The turrets associated with Milecastle 74 are known as Turret 74A (grid reference NY29015972) and Turret 74B (grid reference NY28545974). The exact locations of the turrets have not been found. Both sites fall within Burgh Marsh where there is no evidence for any Wall structures.
