= Milecastle 61 =

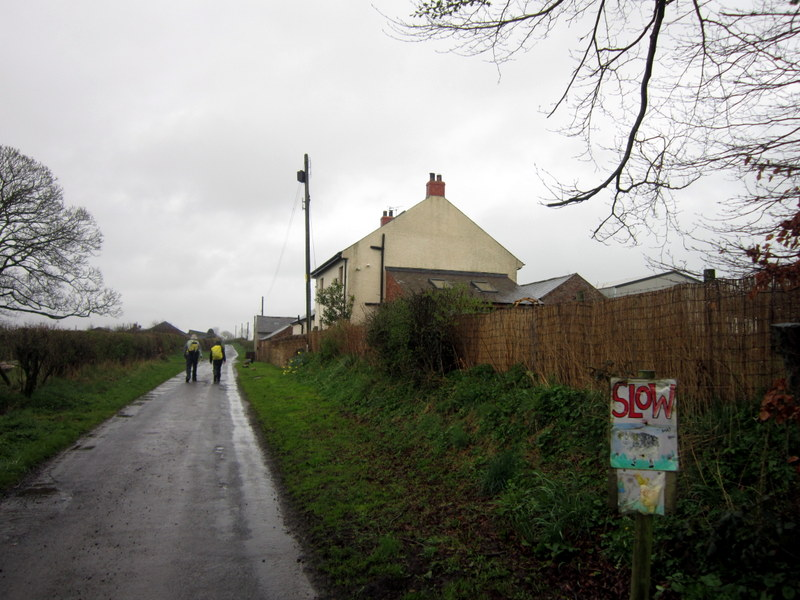
- Hadrian's Wall Path at the approximate location of Milecastle 61

- Location within Cumbria
- 54.939648°N 2.850894°W
- Type: Milecastle
- Location: Cumbria, England

Milecastle 61 (Wallhead) was a milecastle on Hadrian's Wall (grid reference NY45586088).

== Description ==
Milecastle 61 is believed to lie close to Wallhead Farm in the civil parish of Stanwix Rural. Its exact position is uncertain, but its location may be indicated by area of high resistance found during a geophysical survey conducted in 1981.

About 400 metres to the south is a complex of cropmarks at Moss Side, first observed in 1949. It is believed that they consist principally of two superimposed Roman temporary camps.

== Associated turrets ==
Each milecastle on Hadrian's Wall had two associated turret structures. These turrets were positioned approximately one-third and two-thirds of a Roman mile to the west of the Milecastle, and would probably have been manned by part of the milecastle's garrison. The turrets associated with Milecastle 61 are known as Turret 61A (grid reference NY451607) and Turret 61B (grid reference NY447606). None of the turrets between Milecastles 59 and 72 were sought or identified prior to 1961, and the exact locations of turrets 61A and 61B have not been found.
