= Milecastle 47 =

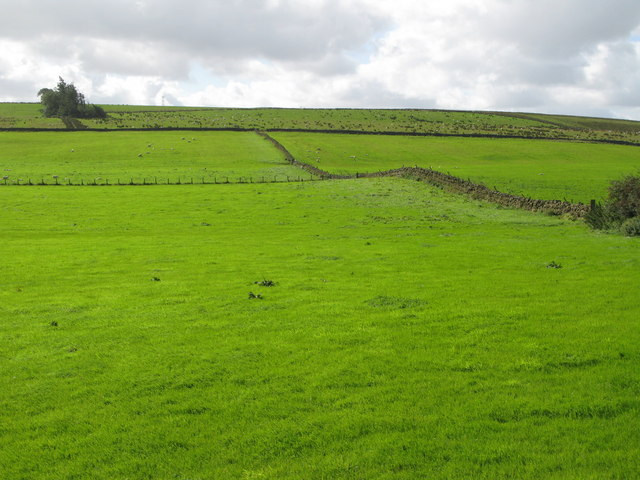
- The site of Milecastle 47

- Location within Northumberland
- 54.988021°N 2.549985°W
- Type: Milecastle
- Location: Northumberland, England

Milecastle 47 (Chapel House) was a milecastle on Hadrian's Wall (grid reference NY64906607).

== Description ==
Milecastle 47 is about 270 metres east of Chapel House near Gilsland. The site is in a pasture field, and there are no visible remains other than a slight earthwork platform. Robbing of the milecastle using explosives occurred in the 19th century.

== Associated turrets ==
Each milecastle on Hadrian's Wall had two associated turret structures. These turrets were positioned approximately one-third and two-thirds of a Roman mile to the west of the Milecastle, and would probably have been manned by part of the milecastle's garrison. The turrets associated with Milecastle 47 are known as Turret 47A and Turret 47B.

=== Turret 47A ===
Turret 47A (Foultown) (grid reference NY64416615) was located by exploratory excavation in 1912. There are no remains visible.

=== Turret 47B ===
Turret 47B (Gap) (grid reference NY63926625) was also located by exploratory excavation in 1912. The site is now overlain by a house and garden.
