= Milecastle 72 =

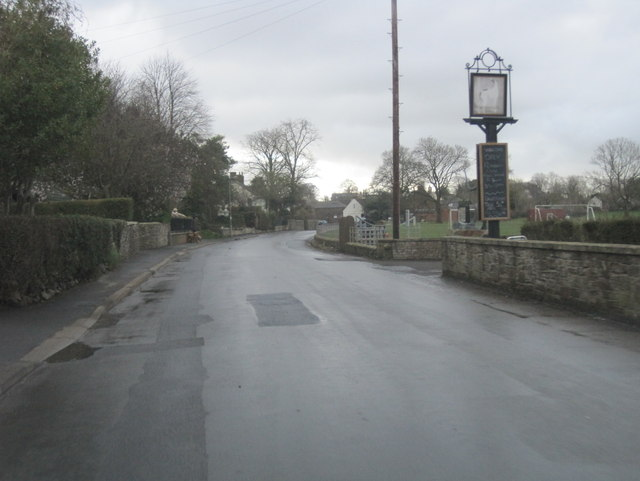
- Milecastle 72 lies next to the road passing through Burgh by Sands

- Location within the former City of Carlisle district Location within Cumbria
- 54.922312°N 3.056017°W
- Type: Milecastle
- Location: Cumbria, England

Milecastle 72 (Fauld Farm) was one of a series of Milecastles or small fortlets built at intervals of approximately one Roman mile along Hadrian's Wall (grid reference NY32415913).

== Description ==
Milecastle 72 is in the village of Burgh by Sands. The east wall of the milecastle is below a farm access track. It was located about 400 metres west of the Roman fort of Aballava. There are no visible remains above ground.

== Excavations ==
Milecastle 72 was located and partially excavated in 1960. It was excavated again in 1977 and 1989. The excavations uncovered the north, west and east walls. The milecastle was originally built with turf walls and then replaced in stone, probably in the second half of the 2nd-century at the same time as the replacement of the Turf Wall by a stone wall. The walls were 2.2 metres wide. The stone milecastle measured 24.3 metres across its overall width, with an internal width between the walls of 19 metres. The south side of the milecastle has not been identified. Most of the pottery found was of the 2nd century.

== Associated turrets ==
Each milecastle on Hadrian's Wall had two associated turret structures. These turrets were positioned approximately one-third and two-thirds of a Roman mile to the west of the Milecastle, and would probably have been manned by part of the milecastle's garrison. The turrets associated with Milecastle 72 are known as Turret 72A and Turret 72B.

Turret 72A (grid reference NY31925908) has never been located, and its position has been calculated from the neighbouring milecastles. Pottery fragments have been found near the measured position, but no trace of the turret has been found.

Turret 72B (Rindle Hill) (grid reference NY31445922) was located and partially excavated in 1948. It lies in the north east corner of a field. The excavations showed that it was from the original Turf Wall series and it projected 1.2 metres north of the line of the later Stone Wall. There are no visible remains above ground.
