= Milecastle =

Small fort on a Roman frontier

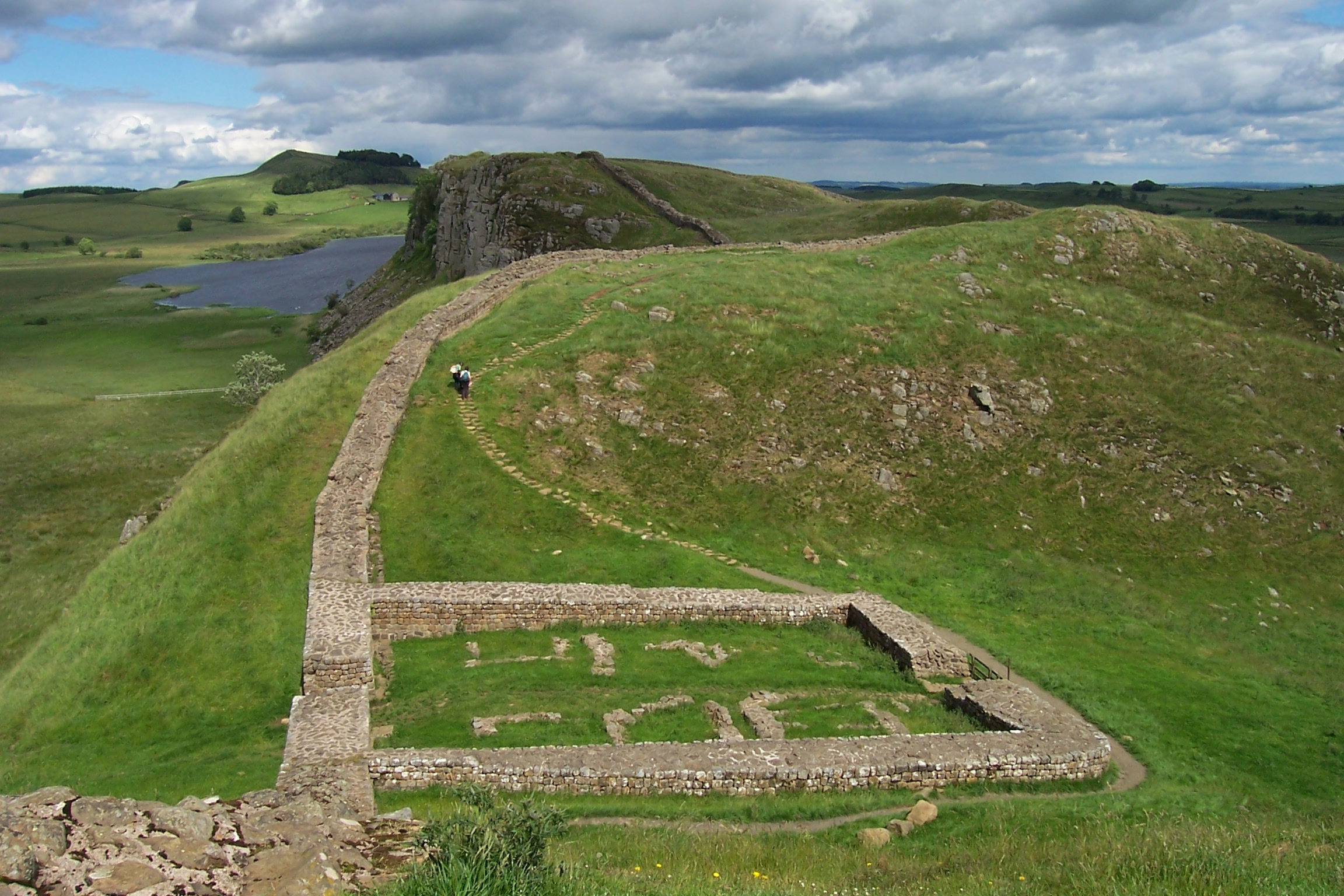
The remains of Milecastle 39 (Castle Nick), near Steel Rigg on Hadrian's Wall

A milecastle was a small fort (fortlet), a rectangular fortification built during the period of the Roman Empire. They were placed at intervals of approximately one Roman mile along several major frontiers, for example Hadrian's Wall in Great Britain (Britannia in the Roman period), hence the name.

Along Hadrian's Wall, milecastles were initially constructed of stone in the eastern two thirds, and stacked turf with a wooden palisade in the western third, though the turf milecastles were later rebuilt in stone. Size varied, but in general they were about 15m by 18m (50 feet by 65 feet) internally, with stone walls as much as 3m (10 feet) thick and probably 5m to 6m (17 to 20 feet) high, to match the height of the adjacent wall. There were 80 milecastles and 158 turrets.

On Hadrian's Wall, a milecastle (there are a few exceptions) guarded a gateway through the Wall with a corresponding causeway across the Wall ditch to the north, and had a garrison of perhaps 20–30 auxiliary soldiers housed in two barrack blocks. On either side of the milecastle was a stone tower (turret), located about one-third of a Roman mile (500 m or 540 yards) away. It is assumed that the garrison also supplied soldiers to man the turrets. The milecastle's garrison controlled the passage of people, goods and livestock across the frontier, and it is likely that the milecastle acted as a customs post to levy taxation on that traffic.

A system of milecastles (known as milefortlets) and intervening stone watchtowers extended from the western end of Hadrian's Wall, along the Cumbrian coast as far as Tower 25B at Flimby, but they were linked by a wooden palisade and not a wall fronted by a deep ditch, and they had no gateway through the palisade.

== Terminology and numbering ==
The term milecastle was formalised by Robert Smith in 1708, but was in informal use by locals before that date. It generally refers to the installations attached to the curtain wall, with the term 'Milefortlet' being widely used to refer to similar installations that continued along the Cumbrian coast and were contemporary with the Milecastles. Turrets standing between milefortlets are referred to as towers.

Milecastles are numbered from 1 (the easternmost Milecastle) to 80 in the West. This system was introduced by J. Collingwood Bruce at the end of the 19th century, and became a standard around 1930, though Peter Hill has suggested that there may have additionally been a Milecastle 0. Milefortlets are numbered from 1 (West of Bowness on Solway) possibly as far as 26 (at Flimby). The widely used shorthand is, for example, 'MC1', 'MC2', etc. for Milecastles and 'MF1', 'MF2', etc. for Milefortlets. Intervening Turrets and Towers are referred to with an alphabetic suffix, so the turrets to the West of MC20 would be Turrets 20a and 20b, or 'T20a' and 'T20b'. Despite evidence of the curtain wall continuing for around a quarter of a mile west of Bowness-on-Solway, the Turrets between MC80 and MF1 are known as Towers 0a and 0b.

Where the Turf Wall and Stone Walls diverge from one another (just to the west of Birdoswald), Milecastles and Turrets unique to the Turf Wall are given a 'TW' suffix, for example 'MC50 TW'.

== Milecastle plans ==
=== Gateways ===
The milecastles of Hadrian's Wall are recognised as having three principal types of gateway:

1. Type I have piers protruding symmetrically on the inside and outside of the gateway, with responds on both the inside and outside. The piers and passage-walls tend to be in large masonry, and the structure is broader (E to W) than it is deep (N to S, i.e. between the gateways). Examples are MC 38 (Hotbank) and MC 42 (Cawfields). Generally thought to have been built by Legio II Augusta.
2. Type II have piers protruding on the inside of the gateway, with responds on outside. The piers and passage-walls tend to be in smaller masonry than Type I. Only found on Narrow Wall milecastles; when similar gateways are found on Broad Wall milecastles, it is sometimes referred to as Type IV. An example is MC 9 (Chapel House). Generally thought to have been built by Legio XX Valeria Victrix.
3. Type III have piers protruding on the inside of the gateway, with responds on both the inside and outside. The piers tend to be in large masonry and the passage-walls in smaller material. Examples are MC 47 (Chapel House, E of Gilsland) and MC 48 (Poltross Burn). Generally thought to have been built by Legio VI Victrix.

=== Axes ===
Two types of milecastle are discernible in plan. These are known as 'Long Axis' and 'Short Axis', with the referred axis being that between the northern and southern gateways. The only (known) exception is Milecastle 79, which was a Turf Wall milecastle subsequently rebuilt with stone.

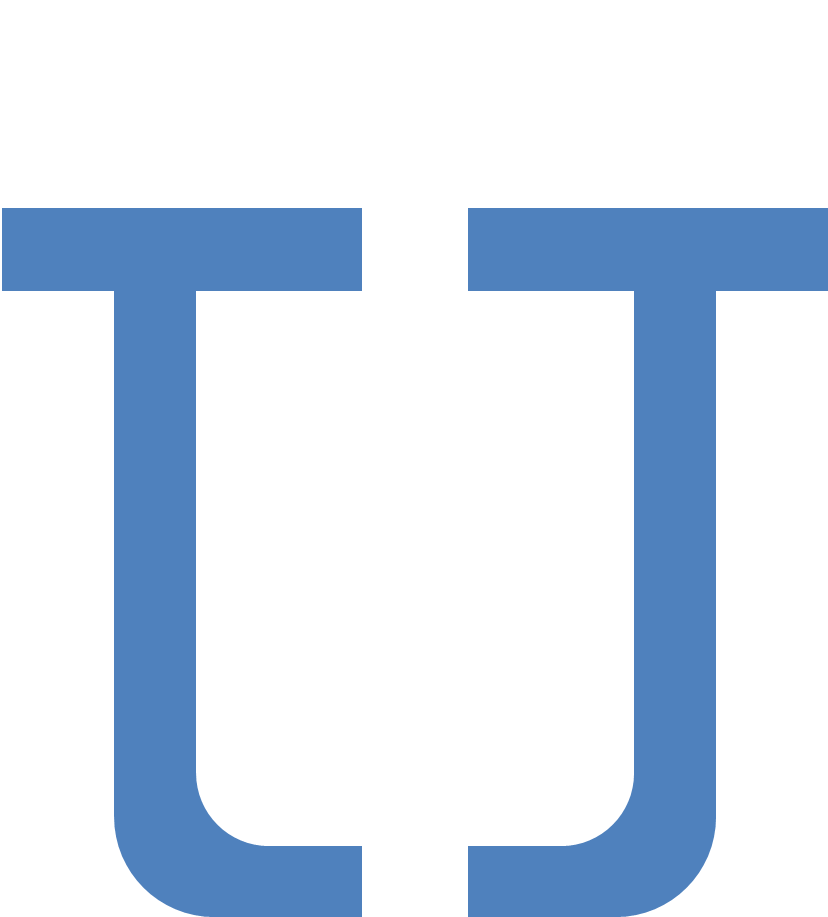
Typical Long Axis Milecastle Plan

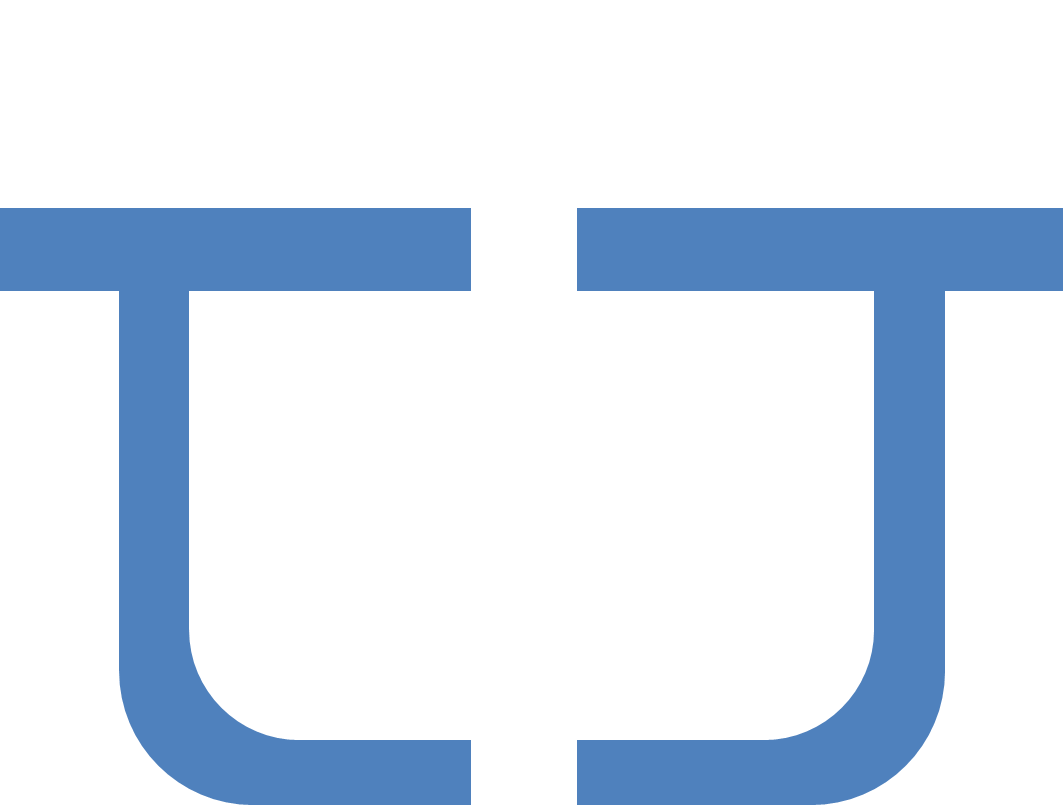
Typical Short Axis Milecastle Plan

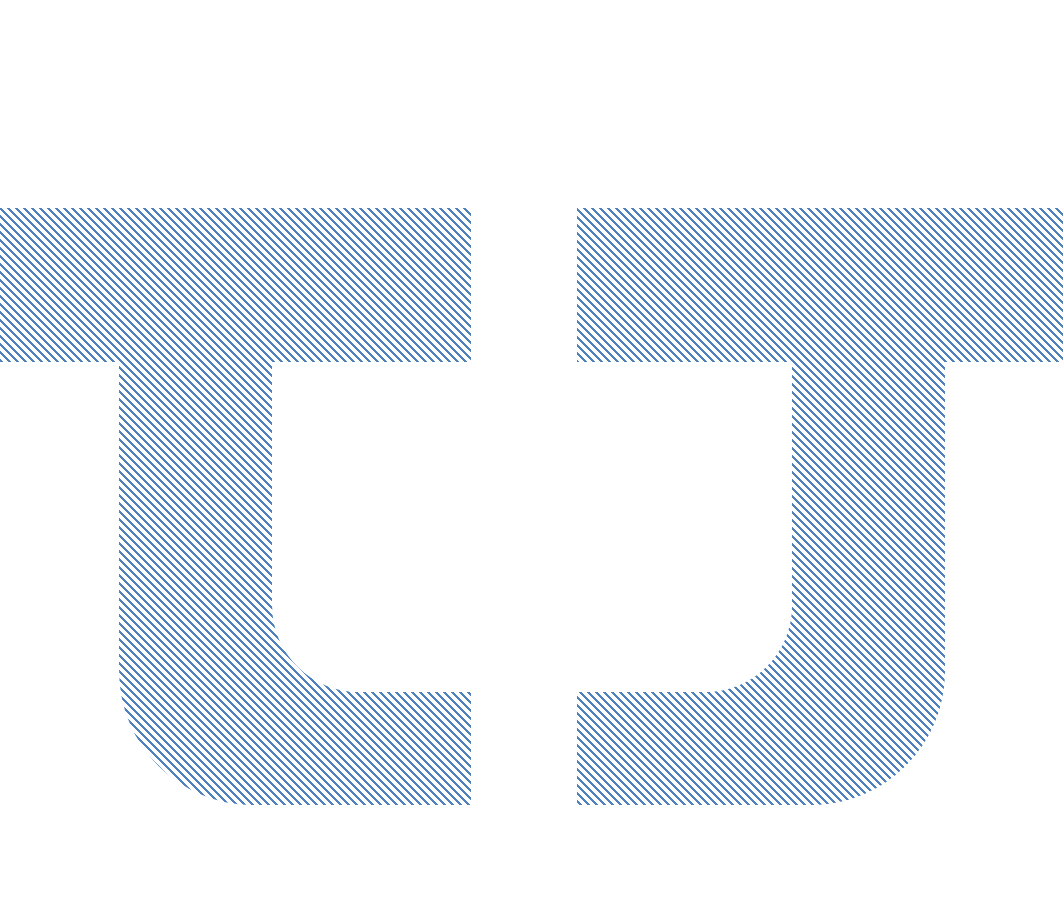
Typical Turf Wall Milecastle Plan
- Gateway Type I – Short-axis milecastles built by legio II Augusta
- Gateway Types II and IV – long-axis milecastles built by legio XX Valeria Victrix
- Gateway Type III – Long-axis milecastles built by legio VI Victrix

== List of milecastles ==
Number	Name
0	(unnamed, existence uncertain)
1	Stott's Pow
2	Walker
3	Ouseburn
4	Westgate Road
5	Quarry House
6	Benwell Grove
7	Benwell Bank
8	West Denton
9	Chapel House
10	Walbottle Dene
11	Throckley Bank Top
12	Heddon
13	Rudchester Burn
14	March Burn
15	Whitchester
16	Harlow Hill
17	Welton
18	East Wallhouses
19	Matfen Piers
20	Halton Shields
21	Down Hill
22	Portgate
23	Stanley
24	Wall Fell
25	Codlawhill
26	Planetrees
27	Low Brunton
28	Walwick
29	Tower Tye
30	Limestone Corner
31	Carrowburgh
32	Carraw
33	Shield-on-the-Wall
34	Grindon
35	Sewingshields
36	King's Hill
37	Housesteads
38	Hotbank
39	Castle Nick
40	Winshields
41	Melkridge
42	Cawfields
43	(Unnamed?)
44	Allolee
45	Walltown
46	Carvoran
47	Chapel House
48	Poltross Burn
49	Harrow's Scar
50	Turf Wall
51	Wall Bowers
52	Bankshead
53	Banks Burn
54	Randylands
55	Low Wall
56	Walton
57	Cambeckhill
58	Newtown
59	Old Wall
60	High Strand
61	Wallhead
62	Walby East
63	Walby West
64	Drawdykes
65	Tarraby
66	Stanwix Bank
67	Stainton
68	Boomby Gill
69	Sourmilk Bridge
70	Braelees
71	Wormanby
72	Fauld Farm
73	Dykesfield
74	Burgh Marsh
75	Easton
76	Drumburgh
77	Raven Bank
78	Kirkland
79	Solway House
80	(Unnamed)
