= Milecastle 57 =

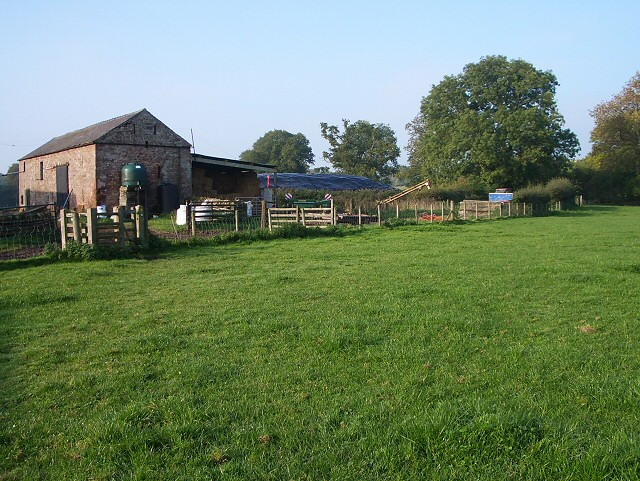
- Milecastle 57 is thought to lie under Cambeckhill Farm

- Location within Cumbria
- 54.965351°N 2.769748°W
- Type: Milecastle
- Location: Cumbria, England

Milecastle 57 (Cambeckhill) was a milecastle on Hadrian's Wall (grid reference NY50816368).

== Description ==
The exact location of Milecastle 57 is not known. Its position has been estimated in relation to the neighbouring turrets, and it is thought to be located below the farm at Cambeckhill.

In the 1960s an exploratory trench was dug by the Ministry of Public Building and Works before a new barn was erected in the farmyard of Cambeckhill Farm. The excavations found the foundations of Hadrian's Wall, consisting of red sandstone blocks and rubble. Elsewhere the course of Hadrian's Wall is indicated by a broad swelling in the field to the southwest of Cambeckhill farm and as occasional rises in hedgelines which cross its course. The site of the Roman fort at Castlesteads (Camboglanna) is situated 430 metres southeast of Milecastle 57.

== Associated turrets ==
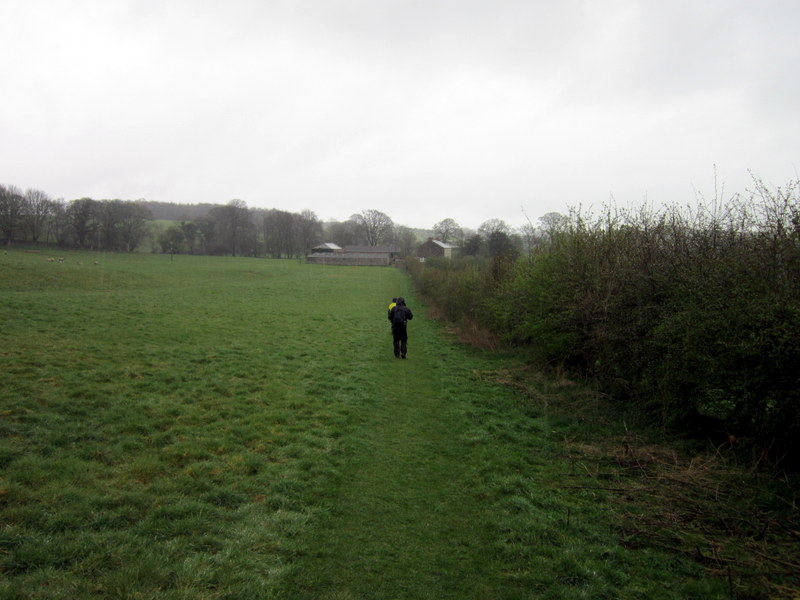
Hadrian's Wall Path in the vicinity of Turret 57A

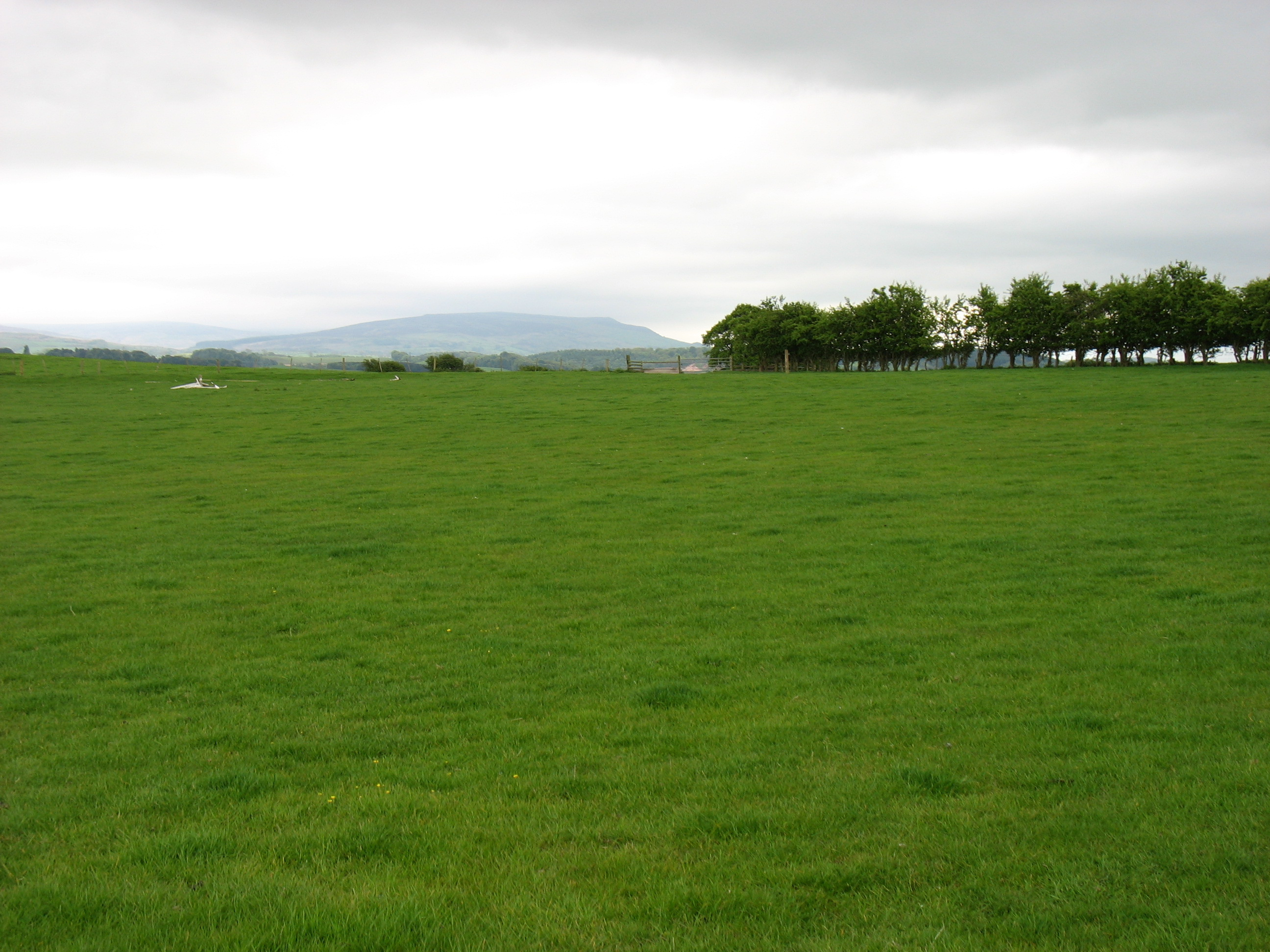
Turret 57B is thought to lie in the fields northeast of Newtown Farm

Each milecastle on Hadrian's Wall had two associated turret structures. These turrets were positioned approximately one-third and two-thirds of a Roman mile to the west of the Milecastle, and would probably have been manned by part of the milecastle's garrison. The turrets associated with Milecastle 57 are known as Turret 57A and Turret 57B.

=== Turret 57A ===
Turret 57A (Beck) (grid reference NY50456333) is situated about 180 metres southwest of Dodgson's Beck. It was excavated in 1933. The excavations confirmed that it was a Turf Wall turret, and it measured 6.1 by 6.9 metres. Much pottery was found including Samian ware. The site of Turret 57A is visible only as a slight swelling in the ground.

=== Turret 57B ===
Turret 57B (grid reference NY50156293) has never been located. Its approximate position has been calculated in relation to other structures on Hadrian's Wall, and it is thought to be situated about 110 metres northeast of Newtown Farm.
