= Milecastle 75 =

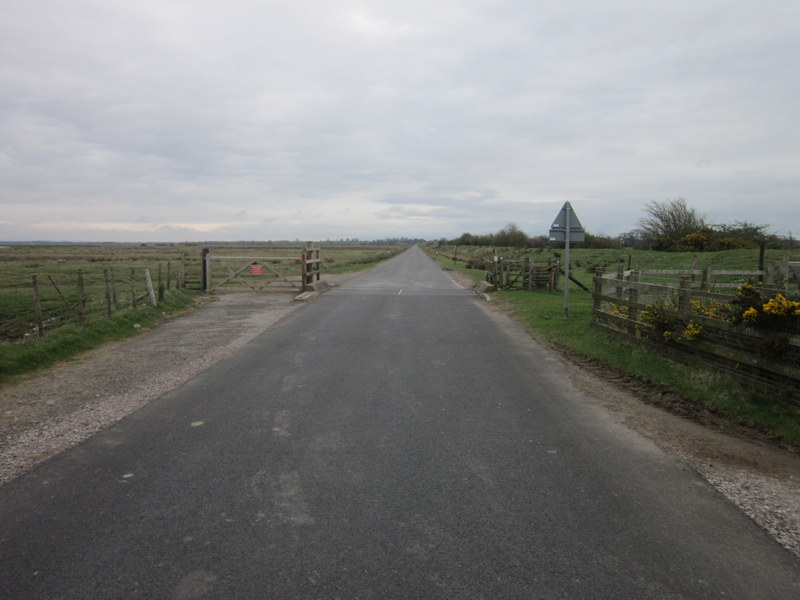
- Milecastle 75 lies near the road from Drumburgh to Burgh by Sands

- Location within Cumbria
- 54.927282°N 3.123093°W
- Type: Milecastle
- Location: Cumbria, England

Milecastle 75 (Easton) was one of a series of Milecastles or small fortlets built at intervals of approximately one Roman mile along Hadrian's Wall in England (grid reference NY28125975).

== Description ==
Milecastle 75 is thought to lie near the road leading from Burgh by Sands to Drumburgh. The milecastle has never been found, and its position has been estimated in reference to neighbouring wall structures. The site falls within Burgh Marsh where there are no known remains of Hadrian's Wall.

== Associated turrets ==
Each milecastle on Hadrian's Wall had two associated turret structures. These turrets were positioned approximately one-third and two-thirds of a Roman mile to the west of the Milecastle, and would probably have been manned by part of the milecastle's garrison. The turrets associated with Milecastle 75 are known as Turret 75A (grid reference NY276598) and Turret 75B (grid reference NY271598). The exact locations of the turrets have not been found. Both sites fall within Burgh Marsh where there is no evidence for any Wall structures.
