= Milecastle 71 =

Milecastle on Hadrian's Wall

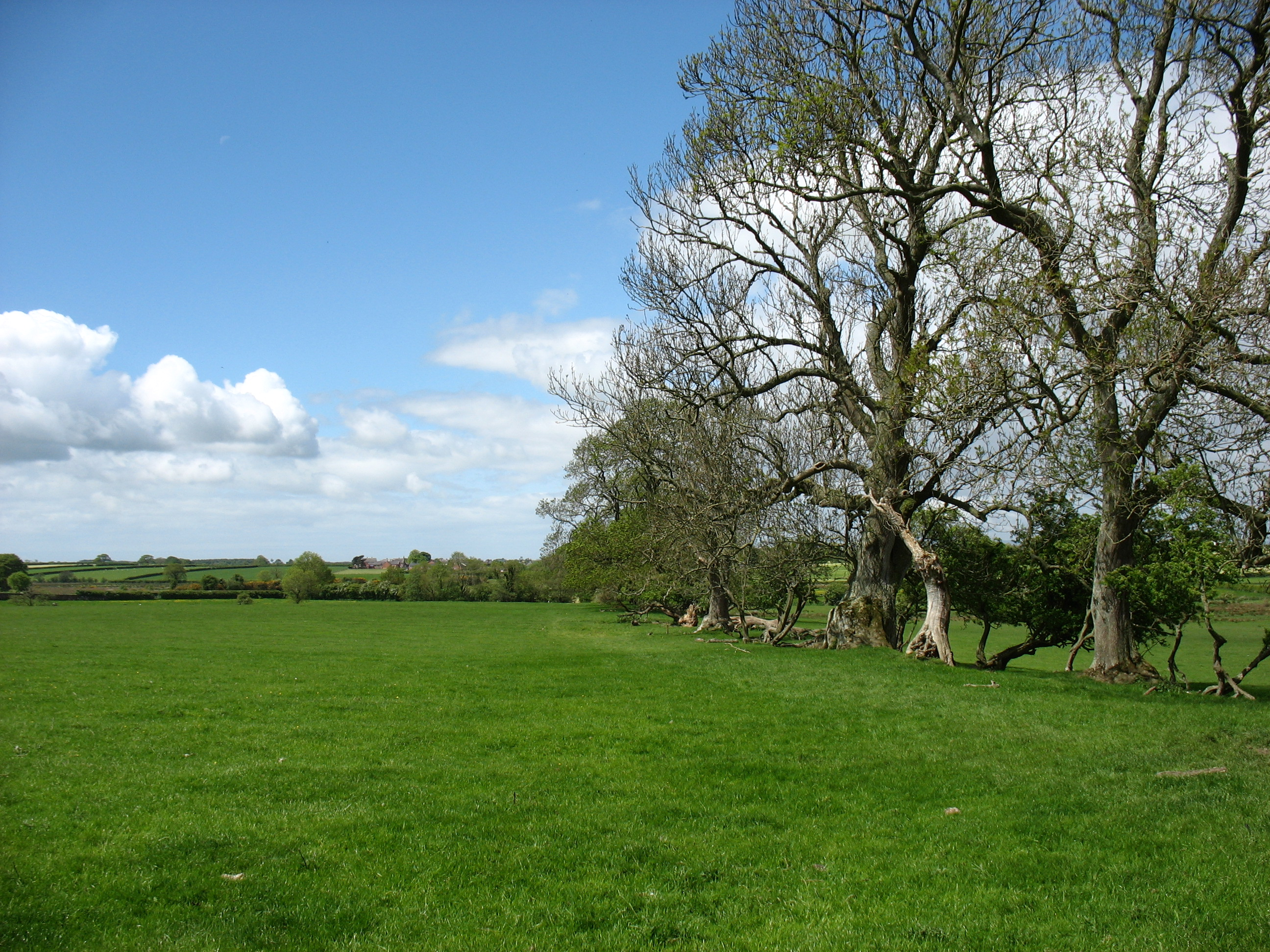
- Hadrian's Wall Path near the site of Milecastle 71

- Location within the former City of Carlisle district Location within Cumbria
- 54.923127°N 3.03435°W
- Type: Milecastle
- Location: Cumbria, England

Milecastle 71 (Wormanby) was one of a series of Milecastles or small fortlets built at intervals of approximately one Roman mile along Hadrian's Wall (grid reference NY33805920).

== Description ==
Milecastle 71 is southeast of the western end of Milldikes Lane, between the villages of Burgh by Sands and Beaumont. Its position was located in 1960, and it was partially excavated. The south and west walls were found, but the east wall lay under a field boundary and could not be located. Five evaluation trenches were excavated in 2000 as part of the Hadrian's wall Milecastles Project. Hadrian's Wall survived as two partial courses of stone overlying a remnant of turf wall. The east wall of the milecastle was located, and there was a possible interior building on the east side of the milecastle. There are no visible remains above ground.

== Associated turrets ==
Each milecastle on Hadrian's Wall had two associated turret structures. These turrets were positioned approximately one-third and two-thirds of a Roman mile to the west of the Milecastle, and would probably have been manned by part of the milecastle's garrison. The turrets associated with Milecastle 71 are known as Turret 71A (grid reference NY33355913) and Turret 71B (grid reference NY32895914). None of the turrets between Milecastles 59 and 72 were sought or identified prior to 1961, and the exact locations of turrets 71A and 71B are uncertain.

The calculated position of Turret 71A is west of the footbridge over Greathill Beck. In the 1960s it was said that traces of worked stone, tiles, and a part of a column could be seen in the stream close to the footbridge. Turret 71B is believed to lie under the fort at Burgh-by-Sands. It is in the area of a modern graveyard.
