= Milecastle 66 =

Milecastle on Hadrian's wall

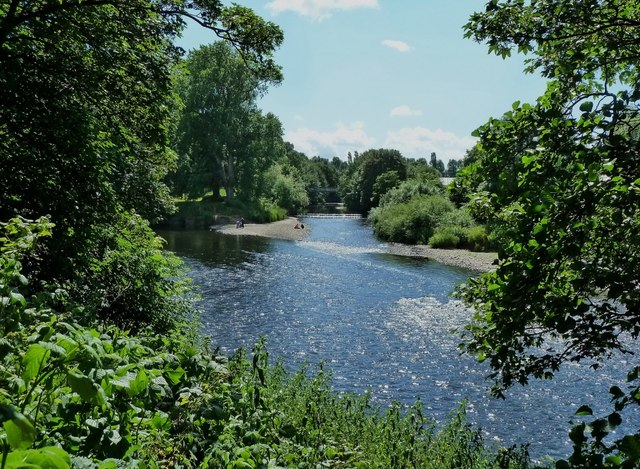
- The River Eden close to the site of Milecastle 66 and the Roman bridge

- Location within Cumbria
- 54.902135°N 2.941333°W
- Type: Milecastle
- Location: Cumbria, England

Milecastle 66 (Stanwix Bank) was a milecastle on Hadrian's Wall (grid reference NY39735678).

== Description ==
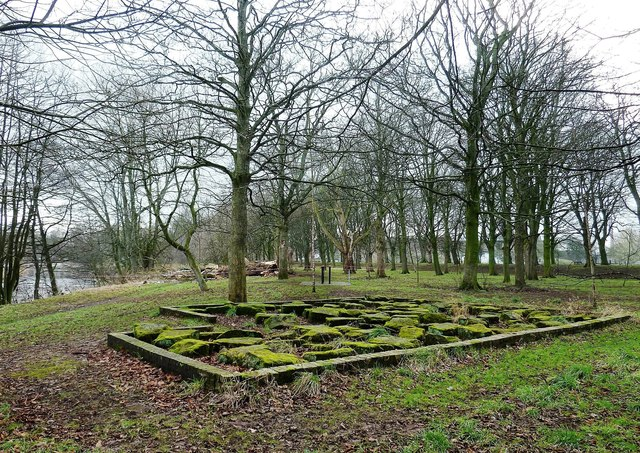
Dredged remains of the Roman bridge in Bitts Park, Carlisle

Milecastle 66 was on the north, Stanwix, side of the River Eden in Carlisle. The site is near the cricket ground. In Roman times there was a bridge crossing the Eden at this point. On the south side of the river was the Roman fort and town known as Luguvalium. In the 16th century, William Camden noted remains of the bridge as "within the chanell of the river, mighty stones the remaines thereof." When the Eden was dredged in 1951, nearly 100 stones were recovered. Most of these dredged stones can be seen today in Bitts Park.

Milecastle 66 was seen by Thomas Pennant in 1772, when he passed through Carlisle on his way to Scotland. He describes the milecastle as "vestiges of some dikes describing a small square, the site of a fort to defend the pass". There are no visible remains of the milecastle today.

== Associated turrets ==
Each milecastle on Hadrian's Wall had two associated turret structures. These turrets were positioned approximately one-third and two-thirds of a Roman mile to the west of the Milecastle, and would probably have been manned by part of the milecastle's garrison. The turrets associated with Milecastle 66 are known as Turret 66A (grid reference NY392566) and Turret 66B (grid reference NY387565). None of the turrets between Milecastles 59 and 72 were sought or identified prior to 1961, and the exact locations of turrets 66A and 66B have not been found.
