= Milecastle 38 =

Part of Hadrian's Wall

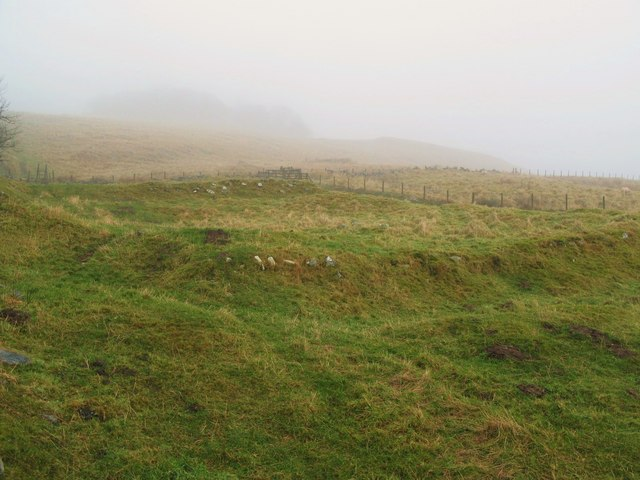
- The site of Milecastle 38

- Location within Northumberland
- 55.007253°N 2.35684°W
- Type: Milecastle
- Location: Northumberland, England

Milecastle 38 (Hotbank) was a milecastle on Hadrian's Wall in the vicinity of Hotbank Farm, (grid reference NY77276813). It is notable for the joint inscription bearing the names of the emperor Hadrian and Aulus Platorius Nepos, the governor of Britannia at the time the Wall was built.

== Description ==
The site of Milecastle 38 is in the vicinity of Hotbank Farm, Little remains of the milecastle except rubble walls outlined by robber trenches.

== Excavations ==
The milecastle was excavated in 1935 and found to be 18 metres (59 ft) east–west by 15 metres (49 ft) north–south. It was found to have a short axis, with a Type I gateway. Pottery finds indicated an occupation of the 4th century. There was a rectangular building in the south-west corner and a causeway, 3.6 metres (12 ft) wide, to the east. A tombstone was found, inscribed "...us.. xit annis... mensibus du...ebus quinque", re-used as a pivot stone in the south gateway.

=== Inscription ===
Milecastle 38 is notable for the joint inscription bearing the names of the emperor Hadrian and Aulus Platorius Nepos, the governor of Britannia at the time the Wall was built. The left-hand part was found c. 1715 and the right-hand part was found in 1829.

The stone reads:

IMP CAES TRAIAN
HADRIANI AVG
LEG II AVG
APLATORIONEPOTELEGPRPR

The first two lines identifies the emperor Hadrian, the third the Legion – Legio secunda Augusta (Second Augustan Legion) which erected the plaque, and the fourth the governor Aulus Platorius Nepos.

== Associated turrets ==
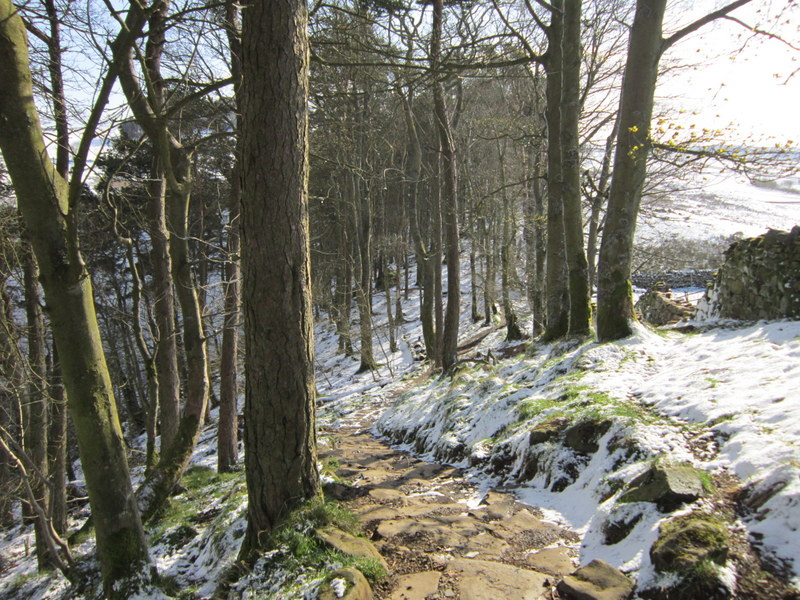
Hadrian's Wall Path near the site of Turret 38A

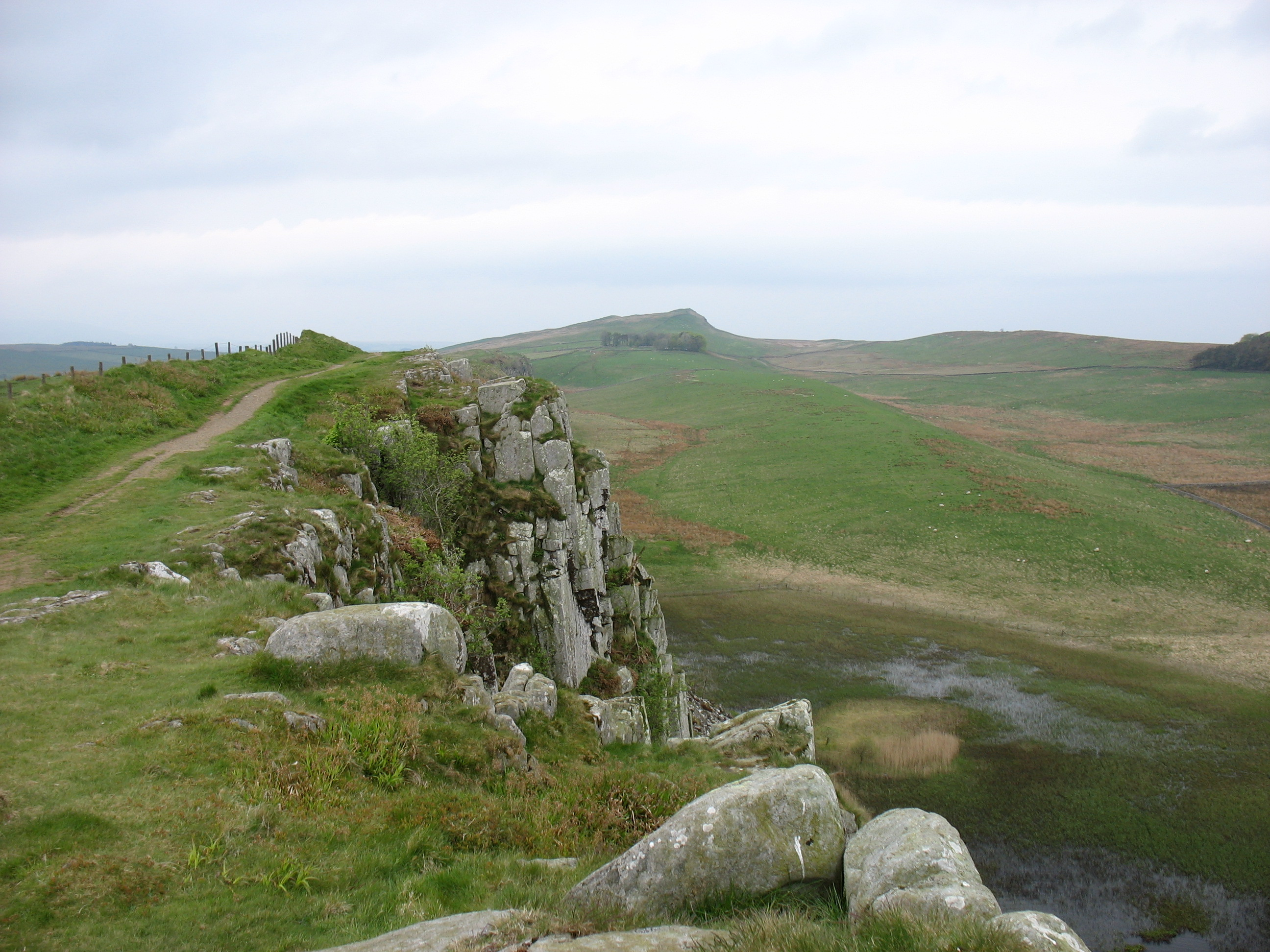
View over Crag Lough near the site of Turret 38B

Each milecastle on Hadrian's Wall had two associated turret structures. These turrets were positioned approximately one-third and two-thirds of a Roman mile to the west of the Milecastle, and would probably have been manned by part of the milecastle's garrison. The turrets associated with Milecastle 38 are known as Turret 38A and Turret 38B.

=== Turret 38A ===
Turret 38A (Milking Gap) (grid reference NY76876792) was located by exploratory excavation in 1911. There are no visible remains.

=== Turret 38B ===
Turret 38B (Highshield Crag) (grid reference NY76396785) was also located by exploratory excavation in 1911. The turret is only visible as an earthwork platform.

== Public access ==
The milecastle, and the sites of both turrets, are accessible via the Hadrian's Wall Path.
