= Milecastle 40 =

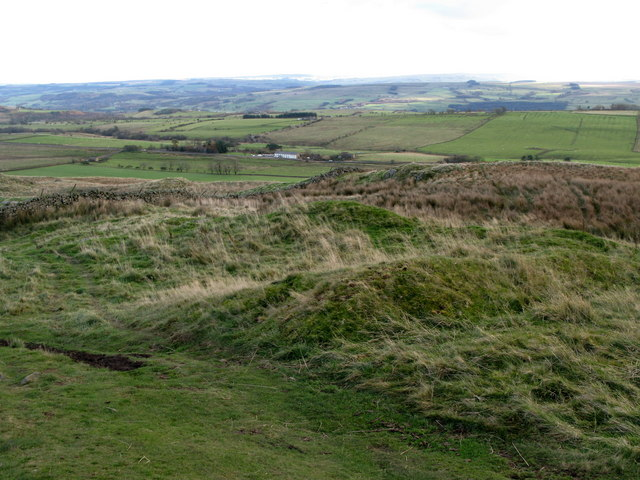
- The site of Milecastle 40

- Location within Northumberland
- 55.002179°N 2.399161°W
- Type: Milecastle
- Location: Northumberland, England

Milecastle 40 (Winshields) was a milecastle on Hadrian's Wall (grid reference NY74566758).

== Description ==
Milecastle 40 is located northwest of Twice Brewed, just below the top of Winshields. The milecastle can be seen as turf-covered rubble banks up to 1.0 metre high.

== Excavations ==
The milecastle was excavated in 1908. The remains were greatly disturbed but the south wall was still ten courses high. It was found to have a Type II gateway; no satisfactory plan of the interior buildings was recovered.

== Associated turrets ==
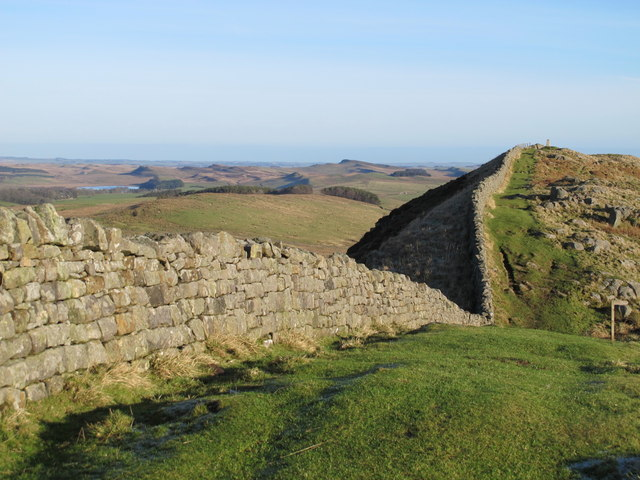
Hadrian's Wall at the site of Turret 40A

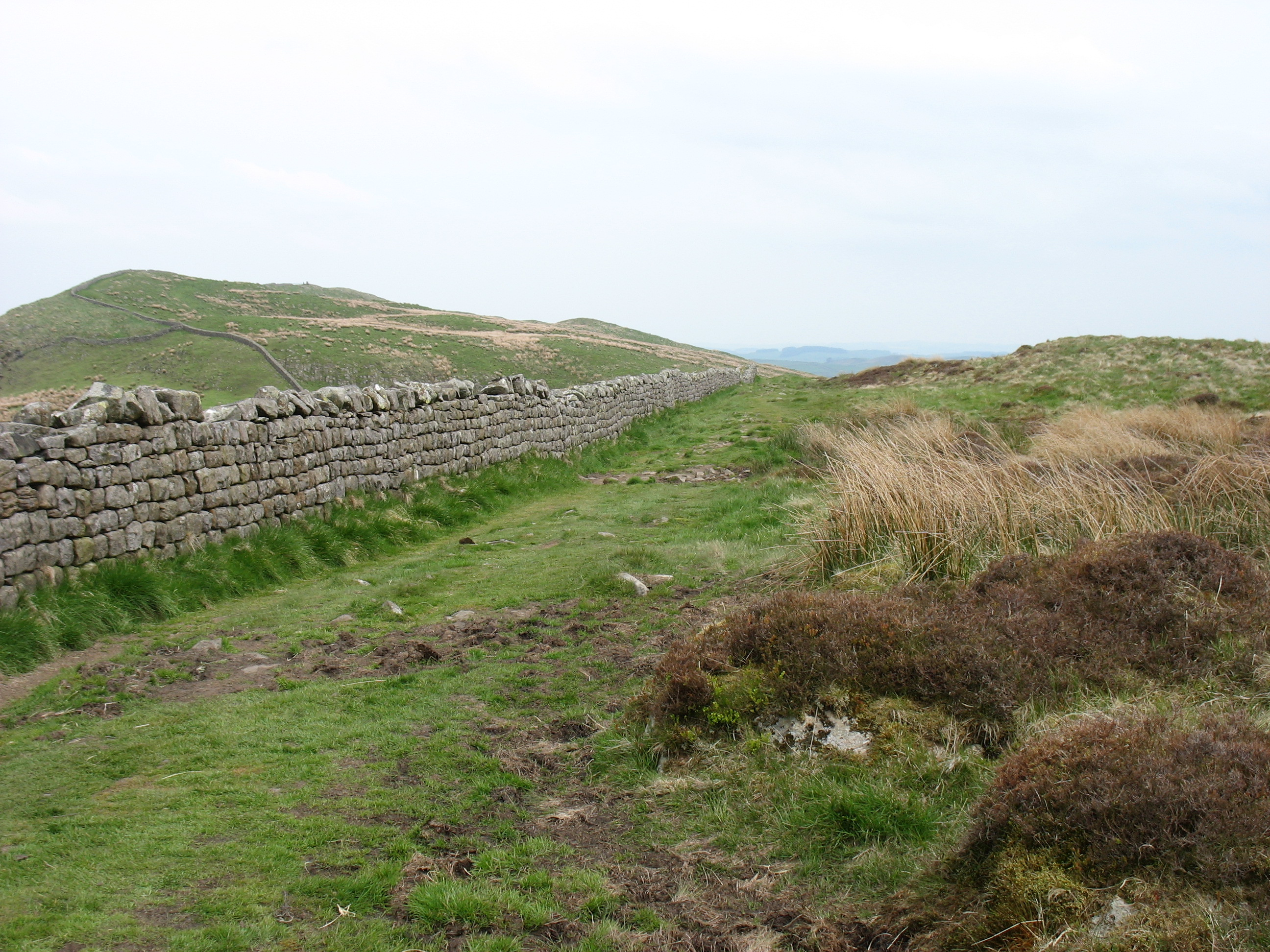
Hadrian's Wall at the site of Turret 40B

Each milecastle on Hadrian's Wall had two associated turret structures. These turrets were positioned approximately one-third and two-thirds of a Roman mile to the west of the Milecastle, and would probably have been manned by part of the milecastle's garrison. The turrets associated with Milecastle 40 are known as Turret 40A and Turret 40B.

=== Turret 40A ===
Turret 40A (Winshields) (grid reference NY74016751) was located in 1912 and was excavated in 1946. It had narrow walls, and had been almost completely destroyed during the Roman occupation. There are no visible remains.

=== Turret 40B ===
Turret 40B (Melkridge) (grid reference NY73526723) was also located in 1912 and excavated in 1946. It was badly preserved, with only the east doorjamb remaining. The excavations revealed that the turret was unusually wide, with an internal width of 2.7 metres. There are no visible remains.

== Public access ==
The sites of the milecastle and both turrets are accessible via the Hadrian's Wall Path.
