= Milecastle 27 =

Milecastle on Hadrian's Wall in England

- Northumberland, England, UK
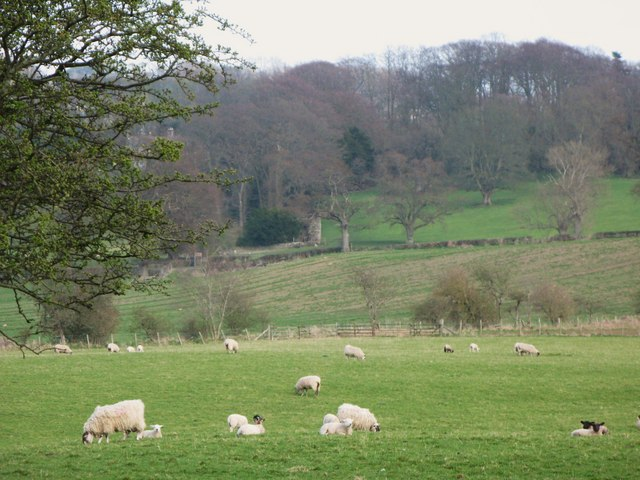
- Site of Milecastle 27

Location
- Location in Northumberland
- Coordinates: 55.024321°N 2.131845°W
- Grid reference: NY91666998

Milecastle 27 (Low Brunton) was a milecastle of the Roman Hadrian's Wall. It was located on the line of Hadrian's Wall, approximately midway between the A6079 and the River North Tyne. Its remains survive as a slight squarish platform with a maximum height of 0.4 metres (1.3 ft), but it is poorly defined to the north and east.

== Construction ==
Milecastle 27 was a long-axis milecastle with unknown gateway type. Such milecastles were thought to have been constructed by the Legio XX Valeria Victrix who were based in Deva Victrix (Chester).

The milecastle had internal dimensions of 60 feet (18 m) N-S and 50 feet (15 m) E-W. The milecastle is of type IV, with broad side walls.

The Milecastle was set in the Broad Wall which, at this point had a clay core with facing stones set in mortar, and unusually broad foundations (varying between 3.35 metres (11.0 ft) and 3.5 metres (11 ft)).

== Excavations and investigations ==
- 1930 – Milecastle 27 was located on 5 April by Miss T Hepple.
- 1952 – The dimensions of the Milecastel were established. No coins or inscriptions were found. Only one piece of pottery was found, but it was not dateable.
- 1966 – English Heritage Field Investigation. It was noted that the milecastle was visible as a low but distinct mound in a pasture field, but that no stonework remained. The milecastle was surveyed at 1:2500.
- 1989 – English Heritage Field Investigation. It was noted that the milecastle survived as a slight squarish platform with a maximum height of 0.4 metres (1.3 ft), but that it was poorly defined to the north and east. Nettle growth was noted within.

== Associated turrets ==
Each milecastle on Hadrian's Wall had two associated turret structures. These turrets were positioned approximately one-third and two-thirds of a Roman mile to the west of the Milecastle, and would probably have been manned by part of the milecastle's garrison. The turrets associated with Milecastle 27 are known as Turret 27A and Turret 27B.

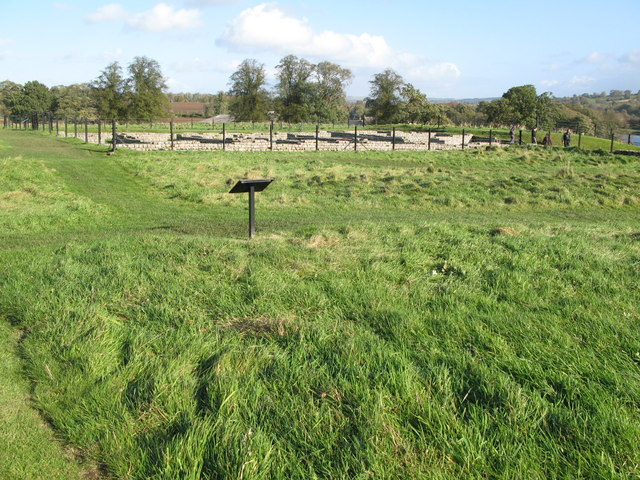
The site of Turret 27A at Chesters Fort

=== Turret 27A ===
Turret 27A was demolished soon after construction to allow the construction of Cilurnum (Chesters Roman Fort). Therefore, only its foundations exist, underlying the remains of the fort. They are located immediately to the east of the northwest corner of the fort's principia (headquarters block). The foundations measured 3.36 metres (11.0 ft) square. The remaining foundations consist of a single layer of clay and massive cobbles.

Location on Ordnance Survey 1:25 000 map: 55.025912°N 2.139139°W

=== Turret 27B ===
No traces of Turret 27B remain. The position is calculated.

Location (by calculation) 55.027639°N 2.145684°W

== Monument records ==
Monument	Monument Number	English Heritage Archive Number
Milecastle 27	18300	NY 96 NW 7
Turret 27A	19098	NY 97 SW 1
Turret 27B	19101	NY 97 SW 2

== Public access ==
There is no public access to Milecastle 27, or the calculated site of Turret 27B.

Access to Turret 27A is with English Heritage admission to Chesters Roman Fort.

== Bibliography ==
- Daniels, Charles (1979), "Review: Fact and Theory on Hadrian's Wall", Britannia, 10: 357–364, doi:10.2307/526069, JSTOR 526069
