= Milecastle 62 =

Milecastle on Hadrian's Wall in England

- Location within Cumbria
- 54.936002°N 2.870795°W
- Type: Milecastle
- Location: Cumbria, England

Milecastle 62 (Walby East) was a milecastle on Hadrian's Wall (grid reference NY44306049).

== Description ==
Milecastle 62 is about 500 metres east of the hamlet of Walby in the civil parish of Stanwix Rural. There are no visible remains.

== Excavations ==
The site of Milecastle 62 was tentatively identified in a geophysical survey in 1980/1. Nine test pits were dug across the site in 1999. The milecastle had been heavily robbed of stone, but the excavators were able to identify various features such as the site of the north gate, and an internal building. The milecastle was of the long axis type and measured (internally) 16.5 metres by 24 metres. Traces of the original Turf Wall and its milecastle survived beneath the stonework.

== Associated turrets ==
Each milecastle on Hadrian's Wall had two associated turret structures. These turrets were positioned approximately one-third and two-thirds of a Roman mile to the west of the Milecastle, and would probably have been manned by part of the milecastle's garrison. The turrets associated with Milecastle 62 are known as Turret 62A (grid reference NY438604) and Turret 62B (grid reference NY435601). None of the turrets between Milecastles 59 and 72 were sought or identified prior to 1961, and the exact locations of turrets 62A and 62B have not been found.
