= Milecastle 21 =

Milecastle on Hadrian's Wall in England

- Northumberland, England, UK
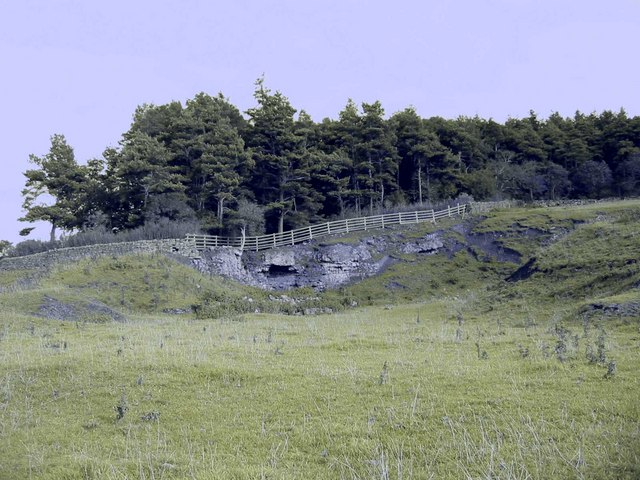
- The quarry at Downhill which has obliterated any trace of the milecastle

Location
- Location in Northumberland
- Coordinates: 55.011201°N 1.994794°W
- Grid reference: NZ00436851

Milecastle 21 (Down Hill) was a milecastle of the Roman Hadrian's Wall. The site was identified by measurement only, as the milecastle's remains have been totally removed. This is probably due to extensive quarrying at the site, which now lies under pasture (and partly beneath the Military Road).

== Construction ==
No details of the Milecastle's construction have been identified.

== Excavations and investigations ==
- 1966 – English Heritage Field Investigation. It was noted that there were no visible remains, and that the area was greatly disturbed by quarry tracks and spoil.
- 1989 – English Heritage Field Investigation. It was again noted that there were no visible remains, and the probable location was restated.

== Associated turrets ==
Each milecastle on Hadrian's Wall had two associated turret structures. These turrets were positioned approximately one-third and two-thirds of a Roman mile to the west of the Milecastle, and would probably have been manned by part of the milecastle's garrison. The turrets associated with Milecastle 21 are known as Turret 21A and Turret 21B.

=== Turret 21A ===
Turret 21A (Red House) is probably located 73 metres (80 yd) to the east of the east wall of Onnum, though some doubt has been expressed by an English Heritage field investigation. Its remains lie under the modern road.

Location on Ordnance Survey 1:25 000 map: 55.010895°N 2.003081°W

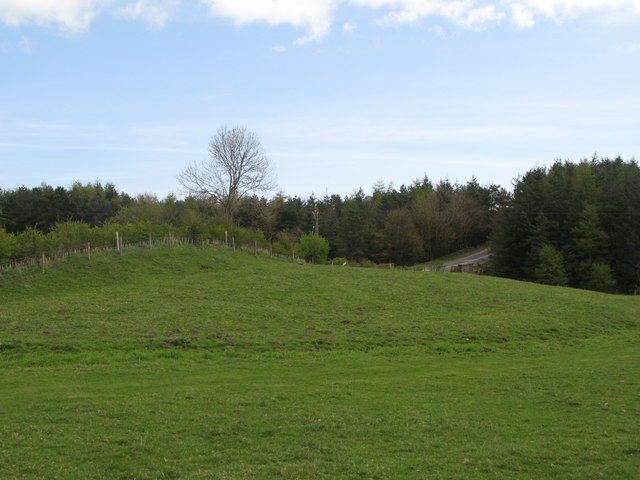
The site of Turret 21B

=== Turret 21B ===
Turret 21B (Fence Burn) is probably located partly beneath the military road, though the exact location has been speculated due to the presence of a small mound along with dark soil and pottery discovered in 1930.

== Monument records ==
Monument	Monument Number	English Heritage Archive Number
Milecastle 21	20473	NZ 06 NW 10
Turret 21A	18154	NY 96 NE 1
Turret 21B	18160	NY 96 NE 3

== Bibliography ==
- Daniels, Charles (1979), "Review: Fact and Theory on Hadrian's Wall", Britannia, 10: 357–364, JSTOR 526069
