= Milecastle 76 =

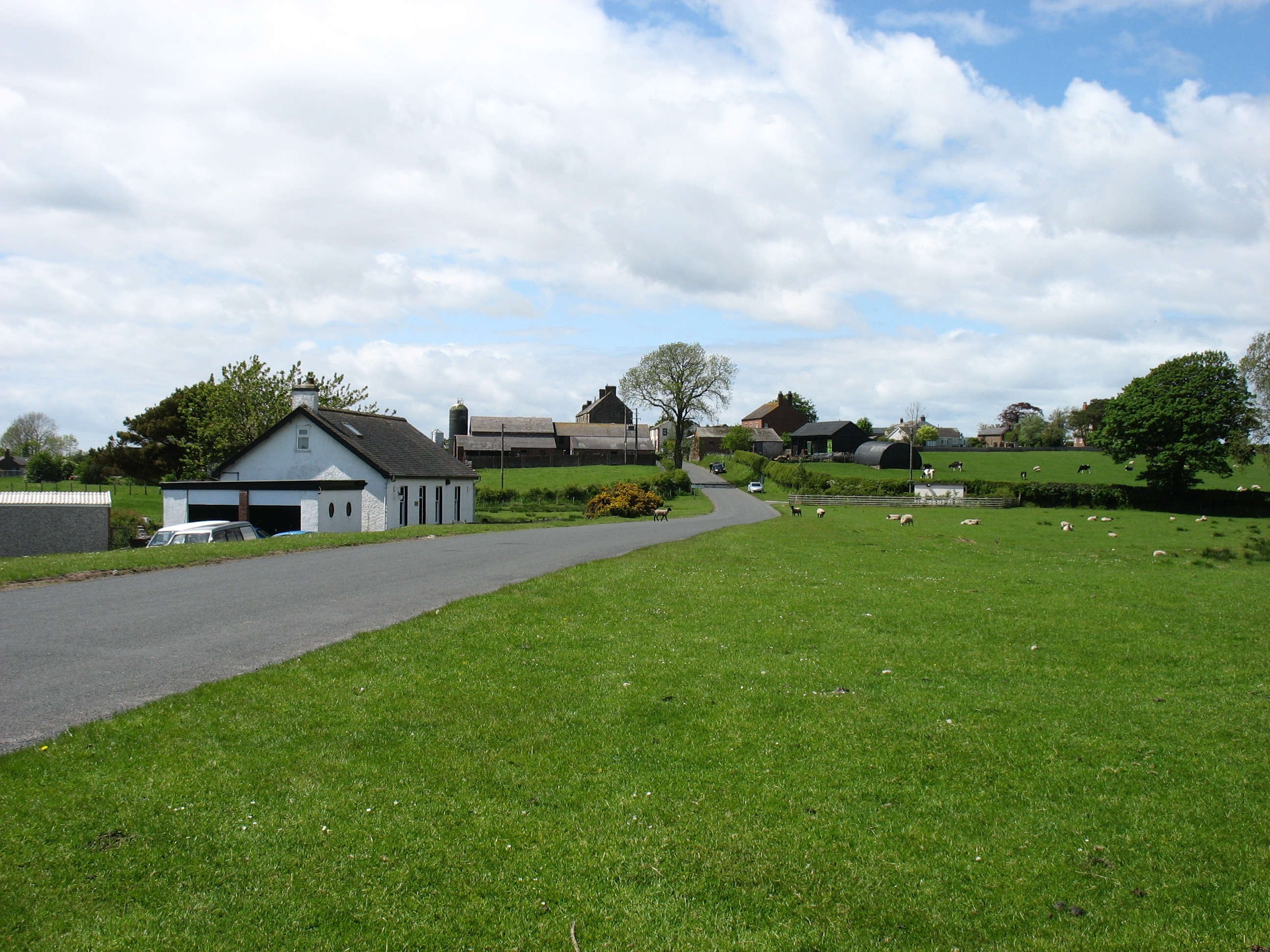
- Milecastle 76 lies near the road leading west into Drumburgh

- Location within Cumbria
- 54.92815°N 3.145589°W
- Type: Milecastle
- Location: Cumbria, England

Milecastle 76 (Drumburgh) was one of a series of Milecastles or small fortlets built at intervals of approximately one Roman mile along Hadrian's Wall (grid reference NY26685987).

== Description ==
Milecastle 76 is thought to lie on the east side of the village of Drumburgh, about 200 metres east of the site of Drumburgh Roman fort (Concavata). The exact location has not been confirmed. There is said to be a faint platform near this location, but it is doubtful whether it is the remains of the milecastle.

About 100 metres to the east it is claimed that remains of Hadrian's Wall were seen submerged in the marsh in 1962.

== Associated turrets ==
Each milecastle on Hadrian's Wall had two associated turret structures. These turrets were positioned approximately one-third and two-thirds of a Roman mile to the west of the Milecastle, and would probably have been manned by part of the milecastle's garrison. The turrets associated with Milecastle 76 are known as Turret 76A and Turret 76B.

Turret 76A (Drumburgh) (grid reference NY26205997) was identified on the ground in 1948. It is said to be located just east of "Drumburgh schoolhouse". There are no visible traces of the turret above ground.

Turret 76B (grid reference NY258602) has never been located. Its position has been calculated by reference to neighbouring structures on Hadrian's Wall, and it is thought to be located 90 metres south of where the dismantled railway crosses Hadrian's Wall east of Glasson.
