= Milecastle 6 =

Milecastle on Hadrian's Wall in England

- Tyne and Wear, England, UK
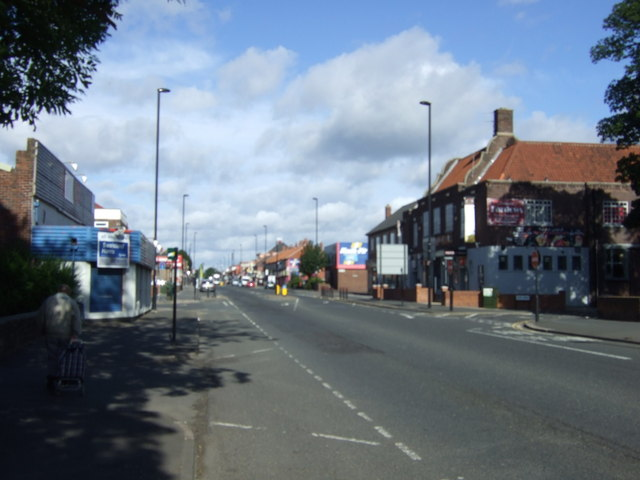
- Milecastle 6 probably lies under the A186 road

Location
- Location in Tyne and Wear
- Coordinates: 54.974663°N 1.653079°W
- Grid reference: NZ22306450

Milecastle 6 (Benwell Grove) was a milecastle of the Roman Hadrian's Wall.

== Construction ==
The exact location of this milecastle is unknown but the wall in this area runs beneath the A186. The area is built over with roads and terraced houses and no milecastle remains are known.

== Excavations and investigations ==
In 1966 J Collingwood Bruce suggested that the site of Milecastle 6 lay beneath the Benwell Grove road in Newcastle.

== Associated turrets ==
Each milecastle on Hadrian's Wall had two associated turret structures. These turrets were positioned approximately one-third and two-thirds of a Roman mile to the west of the Milecastle, and would probably have been manned by part of the milecastle's garrison. The turrets associated with Milecastle 6 are known as Turret 6A and Turret 6B.

=== Turret 6A ===
Turret 6A has never been located from its remains. It has been positioned from the average distance to Turret 6B. This places Turret 6A approximately 90 yards (82 m) east of the eastern rampart of Condercum fort. This places it underneath the houses and road of Westholme Gardens in Benwell.

Location: 54.976487°N 1.662437°W

=== Turret 6B ===
Turret 6B (Benwell Hill) was discovered by Robert Shafto in 1751, during construction of the Military Road, Shafto stated that it was approximately 4 yards (3.7 m) square. It was positioned at a point 308 yards (282 m) west of the western rampart of Condercum. This places it somewhere near to the modern road of Two Ball Lonnen. All surface trace of the turret had been obliterated by modern development by 1968.

Location: 54.978391°N 1.668827°W

== Monument records ==
Monument	Monument Number	English Heritage Archive Number
Milecastle 6	25035	NZ 26 SW 6
Turret 6A	25038	NZ 26 SW 7
Turret 6B	25044	NZ 26 SW 9
