= Milecastle 58 =

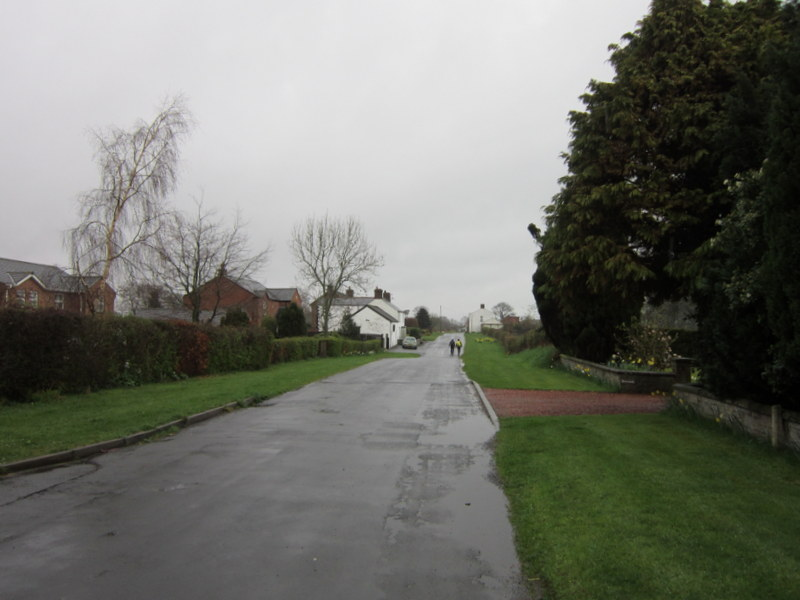
- Milecastle 58 lies just south of the lane passing through Newtown

- Location within Cumbria
- 54.955364°N 2.785641°W
- Type: Milecastle
- Location: Cumbria, England

Milecastle 58 (Newtown) was a milecastle on Hadrian's Wall (grid reference NY49786258).

== Description ==
Milecastle 58 is believed to lie near the lane heading southwest out of the village of Newtown, Cumbria. It is thought to be located on the north side of a hedge which has traces of a platform below it, and an unusually large quantity of stones in the hedge bottom. In 1853, a stone inscribed with the words "LEG II AUG FECIT" (The Second Augustan Legion built this) was apparently found among the stones at Milecastle 58. A geophysical survey conducted in 1980–81 failed to detect the milecastle.

Excavations in 1902 located the course of Hadrian's Wall to the southwest of Newtown, and the geophysical survey in 1981 indicated that masonry still survives on the line of the Wall to the immediate southwest of Newtown.

== Associated turrets ==
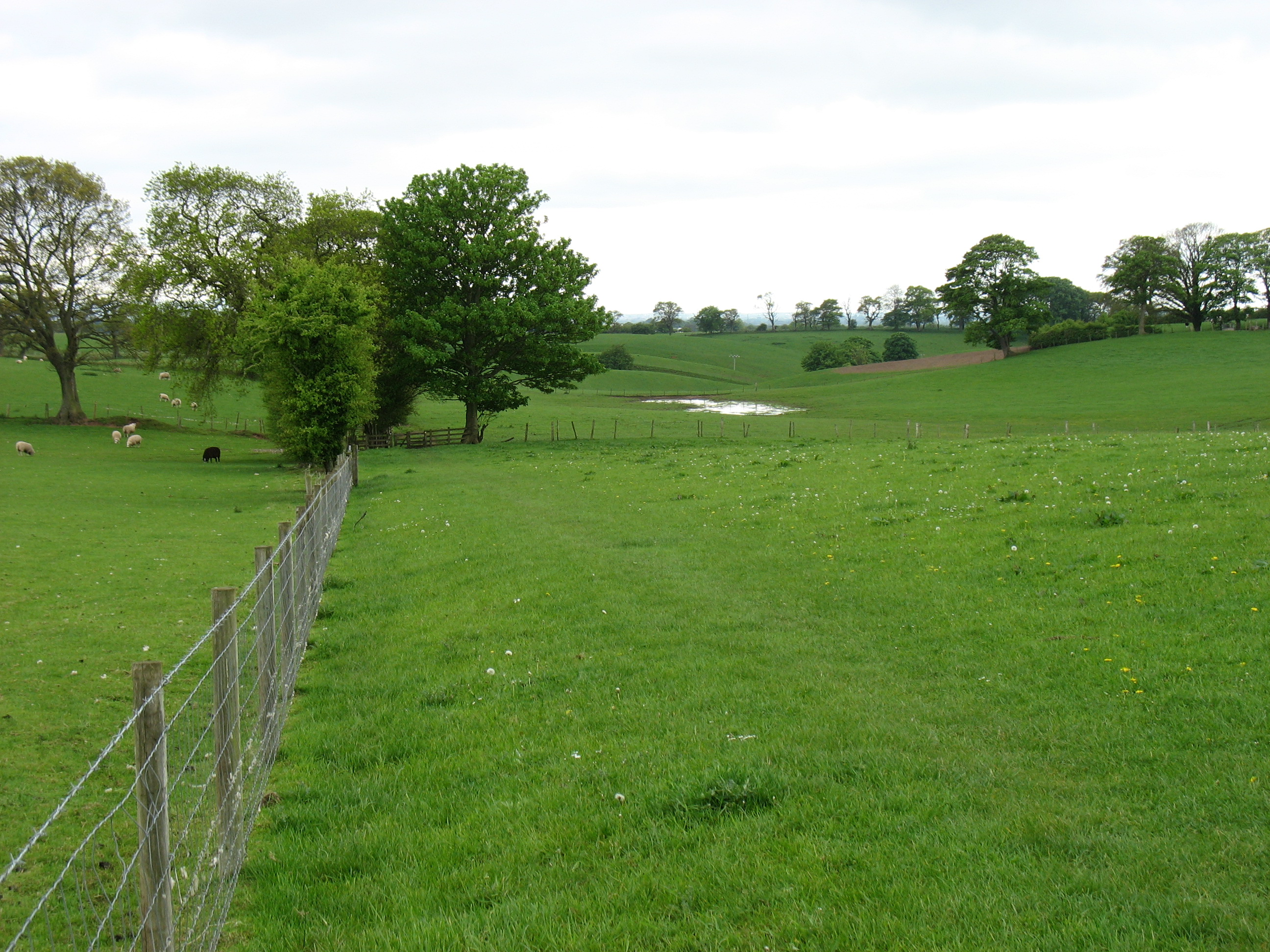
Hadrian's Wall Path at the approximate site of Turret 58A

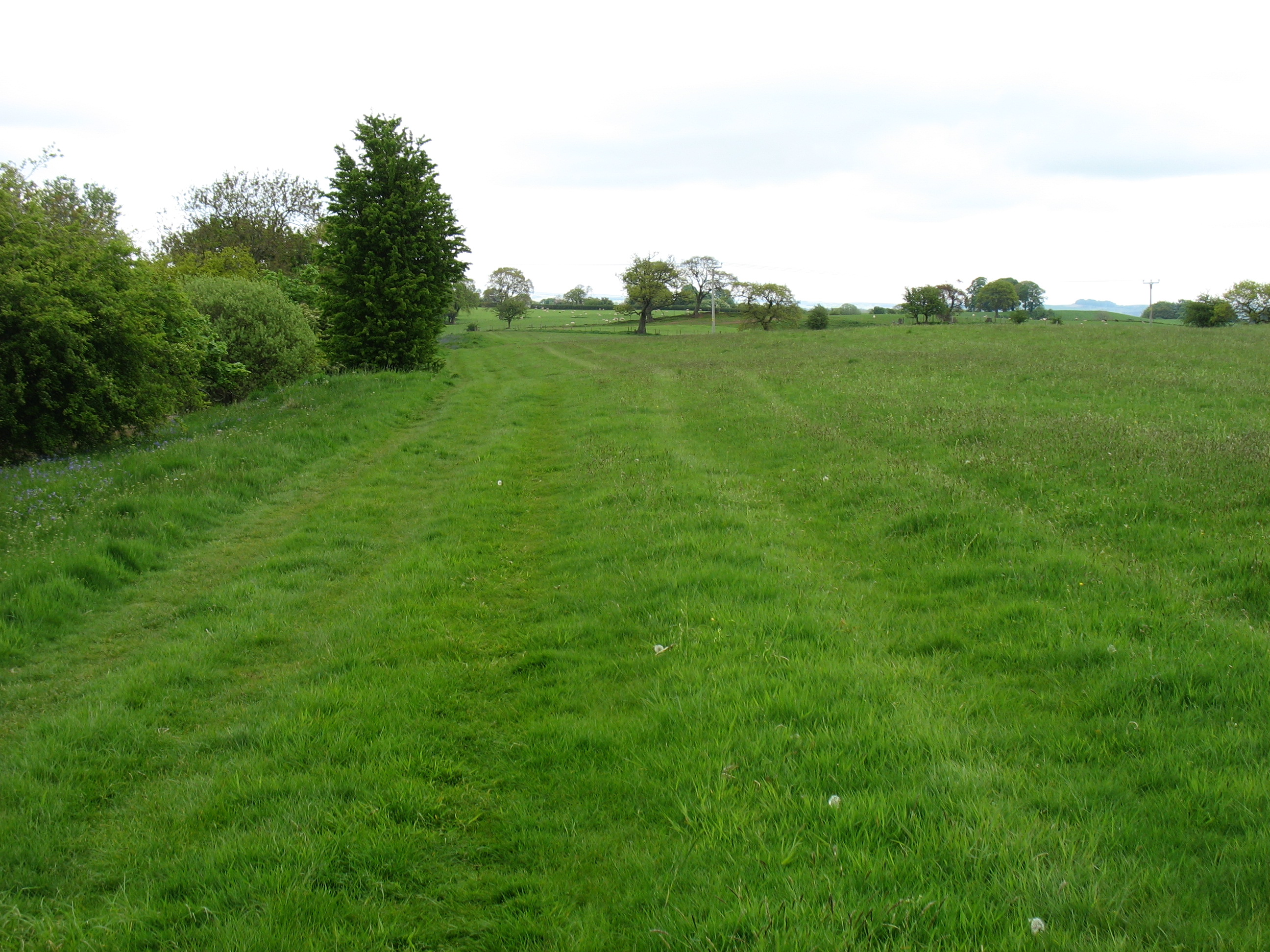
Hadrian's Wall Path at the approximate site of Turret 58B

Each milecastle on Hadrian's Wall had two associated turret structures. These turrets were positioned approximately one-third and two-thirds of a Roman mile to the west of the Milecastle, and would probably have been manned by part of the milecastle's garrison. The turrets associated with Milecastle 58 are known as Turret 58A and Turret 58B.

=== Turret 58A ===
Turret 58A (grid reference NY49406223) has never been located. Its approximate position has been calculated in relation to other structures on Hadrian's Wall, and it is thought to be situated about 300 metres east of Cumrenton farm.

=== Turret 58B ===
Turret 58B (grid reference NY49026188) has an uncertain location. It was apparently found in 1894 by the Society of Antiquities of Newcastle but its precise location was not recorded. Its approximate position has been calculated in relation to other structures on Hadrian's Wall, and it is thought to be situated in the field immediately northeast of Chapel Field.
