= Milecastle 14 =

Milecastle on Hadrian's Wall in England

- Northumberland, England, UK
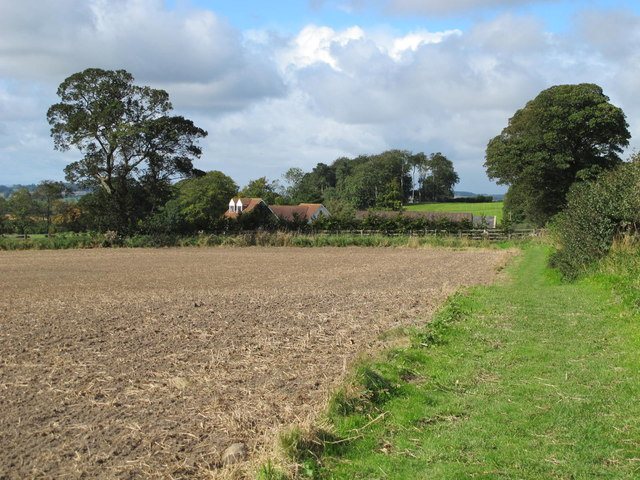
- The site of Milecastle 14

Location
- Location in Northumberland
- Coordinates: 55.003682°N 1.833018°W
- Grid reference: NZ10686768

Milecastle 14 (March Burn) was a milecastle of the Roman Hadrian's Wall. Its remains exist as a low (maximum 0.4 metres (1.3 ft) on the west side) platform, south of the B6318 Military Road and about 1 kilometre (0.62 mi) to the west of the road junction at Rudchester Farm.

== Construction ==
Milecastle 14 was a short-axis milecastle with unknown gateway type (though the dimensions of the north gateway were found to match those of Milecastle 37, and the gateway had been blocked up some time after construction.) Short axis milecastles (Type I) were thought to have been constructed by the Legio II Augusta who were based in Isca Augusta (Caerleon).

The milecastle had dimensions of 18.29 metres (60.0 ft) across, having broad walls.

The remains of an internal building 5.11 metres (16.8 ft) wide, (located on the west side) have been identified.

== Excavations and investigations ==
- 1930 – The earthworks of the Milecastle platform are identified from an aerial photograph.
- 1946 – Stevens investigated the milecastle, identifying the measurements and state of the north gate. Any remaining evidence of the south gate had been ploughed away.
- 1966 – English Heritage Field Investigation. The previous description was confirmed.
- 1989 – English Heritage Field Investigation. No additional information.

== Associated turrets ==
Each milecastle on Hadrian's Wall had two associated turret structures. These turrets were positioned approximately one-third and two-thirds of a Roman mile to the west of the Milecastle, and would probably have been manned by part of the milecastle's garrison. The turrets associated with Milecastle 14 are known as Turret 14A and Turret 14B.

=== Turret 14A ===
No visible remains exist of Turret 14A (Eppies Hill), though in 1966, an English Heritage Field Investigation reported a concentration of stone in the field boundary hedge, at NZ 1011 6770, on the highest point of the hill, and proposed that this may be an indication of its site. Horsley reported seeing the turret, but is ambiguous with regard to the location.

Approximate location: 55.003741°N 1.843555°W

=== Turret 14B ===
No trace has been found of Turret 14B.

Expected location: 55.004493°N 1.848977°W

== Monument records ==
Monument	Monument Number	English Heritage Archive Number
Milecastle 14	22795	NZ 16 NW 9
Turret 14A	22798	NZ 16 NW 10
Turret 14B	20375	NZ 06 NE 1

== Bibliography ==
- Daniels, Charles (1979), "Review: Fact and Theory on Hadrian's Wall", Britannia, 10: 357–364, JSTOR 526069
