= Milecastle 60 =

Milecastle on Hadrian's Wall

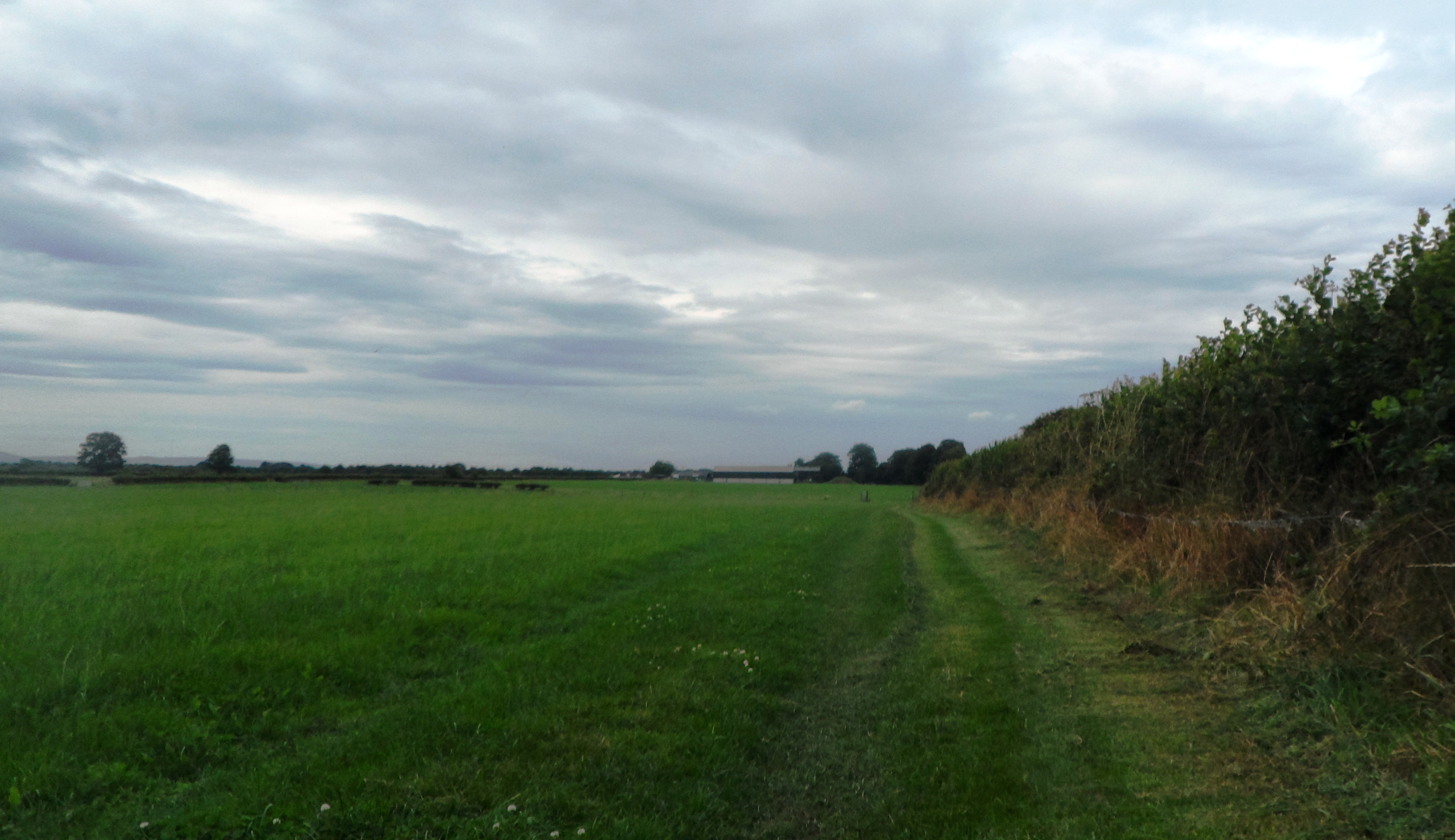
- Hadrian's Wall Path close to the site of Milecastle 60

- Location within Cumbria
- 54.944493°N 2.825862°W
- Type: Milecastle
- Location: Cumbria, England

Milecastle 60 (High Strand) was one of a series of Milecastles or small fortlets built at intervals of approximately one Roman mile along Hadrian's Wall (grid reference NY47196140).

== Description ==
Though its exact position is uncertain, Milecastle 60 is believed to lie about 450 metres (1,480 ft) northeast of Bleatarn Farm in the civil parish of Irthington, at a spot called High Strand, about midway between Oldwall and Bleatarn Farm. In 1851 an altar was ploughed up at this spot. The altar was dedicated to Cocidius, and was erected by the Sixth Legion.

== Associated turrets ==
Each milecastle on Hadrian's Wall had two associated turret structures. These turrets were positioned approximately one-third and two-thirds of a Roman mile to the west of the Milecastle, and would probably have been manned by part of the milecastle's garrison. The turrets associated with Milecastle 60 are known as Turret 60A (grid reference NY466612) and Turret 60B (grid reference NY461610). None of the turrets between Milecastles 59 and 72 were sought or identified prior to 1961, and the exact locations of turrets 60A and 60B have not been found.
