= Milecastle 20 =

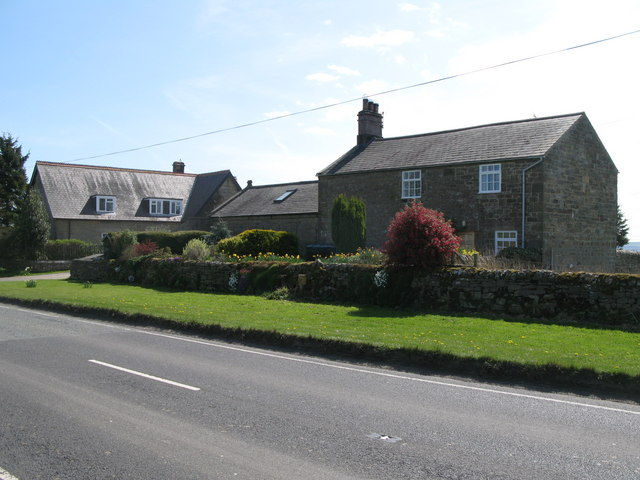
- Milecastle 20 is thought to lie beneath these houses in the hamlet of Halton Shields

- Location within Northumberland
- 55.012716°N 1.972057°W
- Type: Milecastle
- Location: Northumberland, England

Milecastle 20 (Halton Shields) was one of the milecastles on Hadrian's Wall (grid reference NZ01886868). It is situated in the hamlet of Halton Shields, and was excavated in 1935. There is no visible trace of the milecastle above ground.

== Description ==
Milecastle 20 is situated at the east end of the hamlet of Halton Shields. Its remains are located in the garden of a cottage, with the south wall and gate being covered by a house to the immediate west.

An antiquarian depiction of the Military Road at the entrance to Halton Shields Farm dated 1879, shows several large blocks which appear to have been the pivot stones from the milecastle gateway, together with threshold blocks.

== Excavations ==
Milecastle 20 was excavated in 1935. It was about 17.7 metres by 16.3 metres, with a Type III gateway.

== Associated turrets ==
Each milecastle on Hadrian's Wall had two associated turret structures. These turrets were positioned approximately one-third and two-thirds of a Roman mile to the west of the Milecastle, and would probably have been manned by part of the nearest milecastle's garrison. The turrets associated with Milecastle 20 are known as Turret 20A and Turret 20B.

=== Turret 20A ===
Turret 20A (Carr Hill) (grid reference NZ013687) is covered by the modern road, and the precise location is uncertain. It was apparently located in 1935 by pottery finds only.

=== Turret 20B ===
Turret 20B (Downhill East) (grid reference NZ009686) is likewise covered by a modern road, and the precise location is uncertain.

== Roman temporary camps ==
The partial remains of two possible Roman temporary camps lie about 350 metres to the south of Milecastle 20. The camps are visible as earthworks on aerial photographs. The more complete camp is centred at grid reference NZ01886831. The north-western half of the enclosure is visible as a low bank with two rounded corners. A second, less clear potential camp, is to the north-east of the first camp.

== Monument records ==
Monument	Monument Number	English Heritage Archive Number
Milecastle 20	20464	NZ 06 NW 7
Turret 20A	20467	NZ 06 NW 8
Turret 20B	20470	NZ 06 NW 9
Roman temporary camps	1433441	NZ 06 NW 149
