= Milecastle 41 =

Milecastle on Hadrian's Wall in England

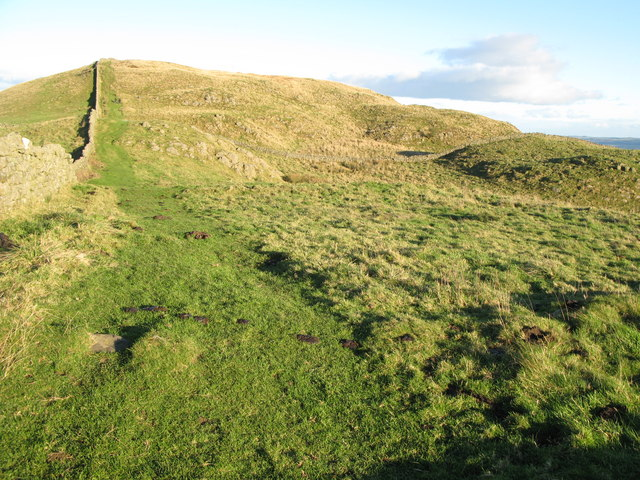
- The site of Milecastle 41

- Location within Northumberland
- 54.997335°N 2.423185°W
- Type: Milecastle
- Location: Northumberland, England

Milecastle 41 (Melkridge) was a milecastle on Hadrian's Wall (grid reference NY73026705).

== Description ==
Milecastle 41 is located to the east of Caw Gap. The milecastle can be seen as turf-covered banks outlined by robber trenches. A cottage, long removed, occupied the site of, and was built from, the materials of milecastle 41.

== Excavations ==
The milecastle was examined in 1946. It was found to have a short axis, but had undergone extensive reconstruction.

== Associated turrets ==
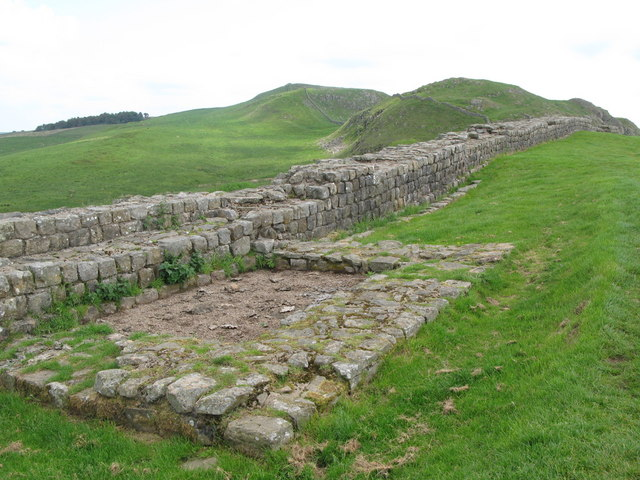
Turret 41A

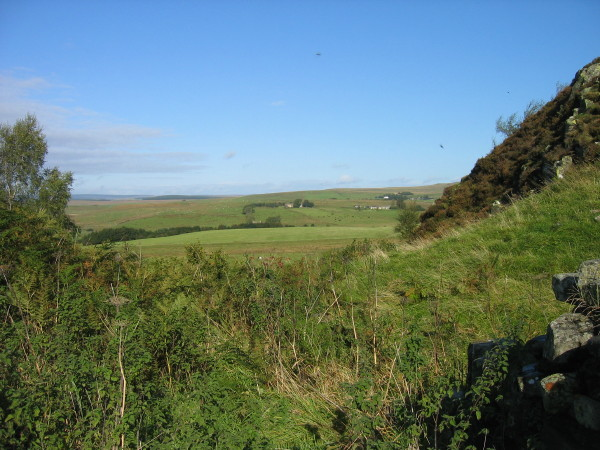
Site of Turret 41B

Each milecastle on Hadrian's Wall had two associated turret structures. These turrets were positioned approximately one-third and two-thirds of a Roman mile to the west of the Milecastle, and would probably have been manned by part of the milecastle's garrison. The turrets associated with Milecastle 41 are known as Turret 41A and Turret 41B.

=== Turret 41A ===
Turret 41A (Caw Gap) (grid reference NY72556688) was located by exploratory excavation in 1912. It had a doorway on the east side of the south wall. In the later Roman period, the turret was deliberately demolished, and the Wall rebuilt across its site. The remains of Turret 41A were consolidated in 1972-3 and are 20 centimetres high.

=== Turret 41B ===
Turret 41B (Thorny Doors) (grid reference NY72056683) was also located by exploratory excavation in 1912. There are no visible remains.

== Public access ==
The site of the milecastle, Turret 41A, and the site of Turret 41B are all accessible via the Hadrian's Wall Path.
