= Milecastle 9 =

Milecastle on Hadrian's Wall in England

- Tyne and Wear, England, UK
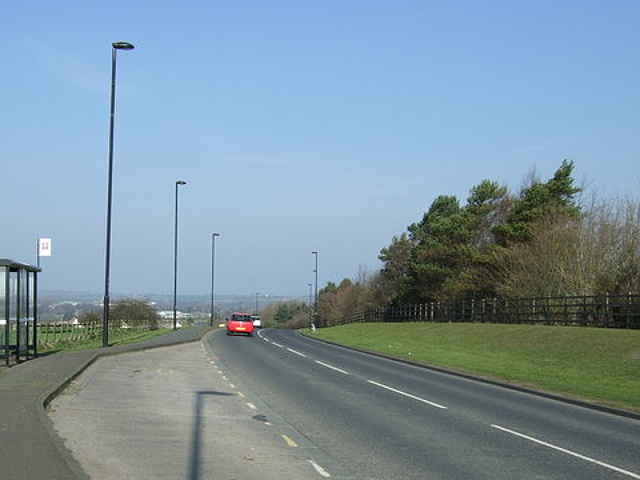
- Milecastle 9 lies under the B6528 road in West Denton

Location
- Location in Tyne and Wear
- Coordinates: 54.990701°N 1.722327°W
- Grid reference: NZ17866627

Milecastle 9 (Chapel House) was a milecastle of the Roman Hadrian's Wall. Its remains exist partially as a low platform, and are located in West Denton (to the west of Newcastle upon Tyne), 300 yards (270 m) from Chapel House Farm. However, the northern part of the remains are now mostly covered by the modern roads (A69/B6528). The milecastle marks a watershed between those with relatively well-defined positions (to the west) and those whose position are less certain (to the east). Milecastle 9 (Chapel House) was a milecastle of the Roman Hadrian’s Wall. Constructed during the early 2nd century AD under Emperor Hadrian, it formed part of the defensive network that marked the northern frontier of Roman Britain. Its remains, though mostly buried beneath modern roads, provide evidence of Roman military architecture and the organization of frontier defenses in the region.

== Construction ==
Milecastle 9 was a long-axis milecastle with Type IV gateways (a broad wall variation of Type II gateways).). Such milecastles were thought to have been constructed by the Legio XX Valeria Victrix who were based in Deva Victrix (Chester). The only other known milecastles with Type IV gateways are Milecastle 27 and possibly Milecastle 10.

The milecastle had internal dimensions of 48 feet 10 inches (14.88 m) wide by 60 feet (18 m) long, with gates 9 feet (2.7 m) wide. The side walls were 9 feet (2.7 m) thick with the south wall being slightly narrower and having rounded internal and external corners to the side walls. The side walls were constructed of a clay and rubble core, with mortared facing stones. Seven stones from the base course were found to bear numerals (5 of 'VIII', 1 of 'VIIII' and one of 'IX'). It is possible that these were cut at the quarry.

A posthole has been found in the western portion of Milecastle 9, possibly indicating an earlier timber structure. The barrack block covered a reasonably small 32m^{2}. As a result, it has been suggested that the garrison size was 8 men, smaller than many other milecastles (which had up to 32). The stone built barracks was extended in the third century and another building of unknown function erected close by to the west.

== Excavations and investigations ==
- 1840 – Hodgson wrote that "about 1790 strong foundations of masonry were dug up at Chapel Houses, on the site called Chapel".
- 1858 – Henry MacLauchlan describes the remains of Chapel House as destroyed so that the outlines can barely be seen.
- 1929 - Only the foundation course of the milecastle's side walls were found to remain, but six courses above the foundation stones remained of the north and south walls. The milecastle's dimensions were established (including an estimate for the width of the south gate). Finds included:.
  - A posthole found in the western portion. This indicates the possibility an earlier timber structure.
  - Part of a stone barrack block. This covered a relatively small 32 square metres, suggested a garrison size of a Contubernium (8 men), smaller than many other milecastles. The barracks was extended in the third century (probably to house 4 contubernia (32 men)).
  - A further building of unknown function erected a short distance.
  - Pottery reflecting each Wall period
  - Coins of Tetricus I and also Valentinian I (indicating the milecastle to be one of only 10 yielding 4th century material)
  - A gaming board
  - A sword scabbard chape
  - Part of a relief of a female figure
  - A further unusual find was that of a Roman or post-Roman cist burial outside the south wall. It contained a headless skeleton thought to be of an individual of 17 years. Also, the bones of an adult man and a woman of about 20 were discovered close by.
  - The Military Way was discovered 32 feet (9.8 m) to the south running east–west, with a branch road to the gateway. At this point, the Military Way was more than 32 feet (9.8 m) wide, of sandstone penning with traces of a curb on the north side
- 1951 – Partial re-examination. The north gate was found, and identified to be a variant of Type II (now known as Type IV).
- 1966 – English Heritage Field Investigation. It was noted that the major part of the milecastle had now been covered by road widening, but the southern portion was still evident as an ill-defined ground swelling within an arable field. There was no evidence of the Military Way or branch road. Excavations were carried out to locate Turret 9A in 1928 but failed to find it.
- 1979 – English Heritage Field Investigation. It was noted that the site had become even more ill-defined since the previous investigation. The site showing no intelligible remains.
- Late 1990s – An English Heritage investigation found that Milecastle 9 was one of only 14 milecastles on cultivated land and that only it and Milecastle 19 were being damaged by farming. Milecastle 9 suffered plough scores across the tops of the surviving walls (the south side lying under a farmer's field). It was concluded that the only way to prevent future plough damage is to take the land out of cultivation.
- 2000 – Partial re-examination. A flagged surface was recorded beyond the south-east corner, and evidence was found that the milecastle may have been constructed on earlier archaeological deposits. A layer of yellow clay was noted below the milecastle, possibly laid down as a building platform. A ditch was found to be present to the east of the milecastle, possibly part of the defences. If this were the case, Milecastle 9 would be one of only five milecastles where a perimeter ditch has been identified.

== Associated turrets ==
Each milecastle on Hadrian's Wall had two associated turret structures. These turrets were positioned approximately one-third and two-thirds of a Roman mile to the west of the Milecastle, and would probably have been manned by part of the milecastle's garrison. The turrets associated with Milecastle 9 are known as Turret 9A and Turret 9B.

=== Turret 9A ===
Turret 9A is thought to lie beneath a modern road in Walbottle, though its precise position is unknown as no visible traces remain. Excavations were carried out to locate the turret in 1929 but failed to find it.

Presumed location: 54.9922°N 1.729511°W

=== Turret 9B ===
Turret 9B (Walbottle) is also located under a modern road (Hawthorn Terrace) near the west end of St. Cuthbert's Primary School. Although surface remains are now obscured by the road, 19 feet (5.8 m) of Turret 9B's south wall was located in 1928, under a hedge to the north of the road. The precise position is a matter of dispute with the excavation report placing it 545 yards (498 m) east of Milecastle 10 whilst another source gives the distance as 570 yards (520 m), however it was recorded that it was built using the same substantial masonry as Turret 7B, with the door in the same position.

Location on Ordnance Survey 1:25 000 map: 54.993672°N 1.736733°W

== Monument records ==
Monument	Monument Number	English Heritage Archive Number
Milecastle 9	22662	NZ 16 NE 5
Turret 9A	22667	NZ 16 NE 6
Turret 9B	22670	NZ 16 NE 7

== Bibliography ==
- Daniels, Charles (1979), "Review: Fact and Theory on Hadrian's Wall", Britannia, 10: 357–364, JSTOR 526069
