= Turret (Hadrian's Wall) =

Small watch tower on Hadrian's Wall

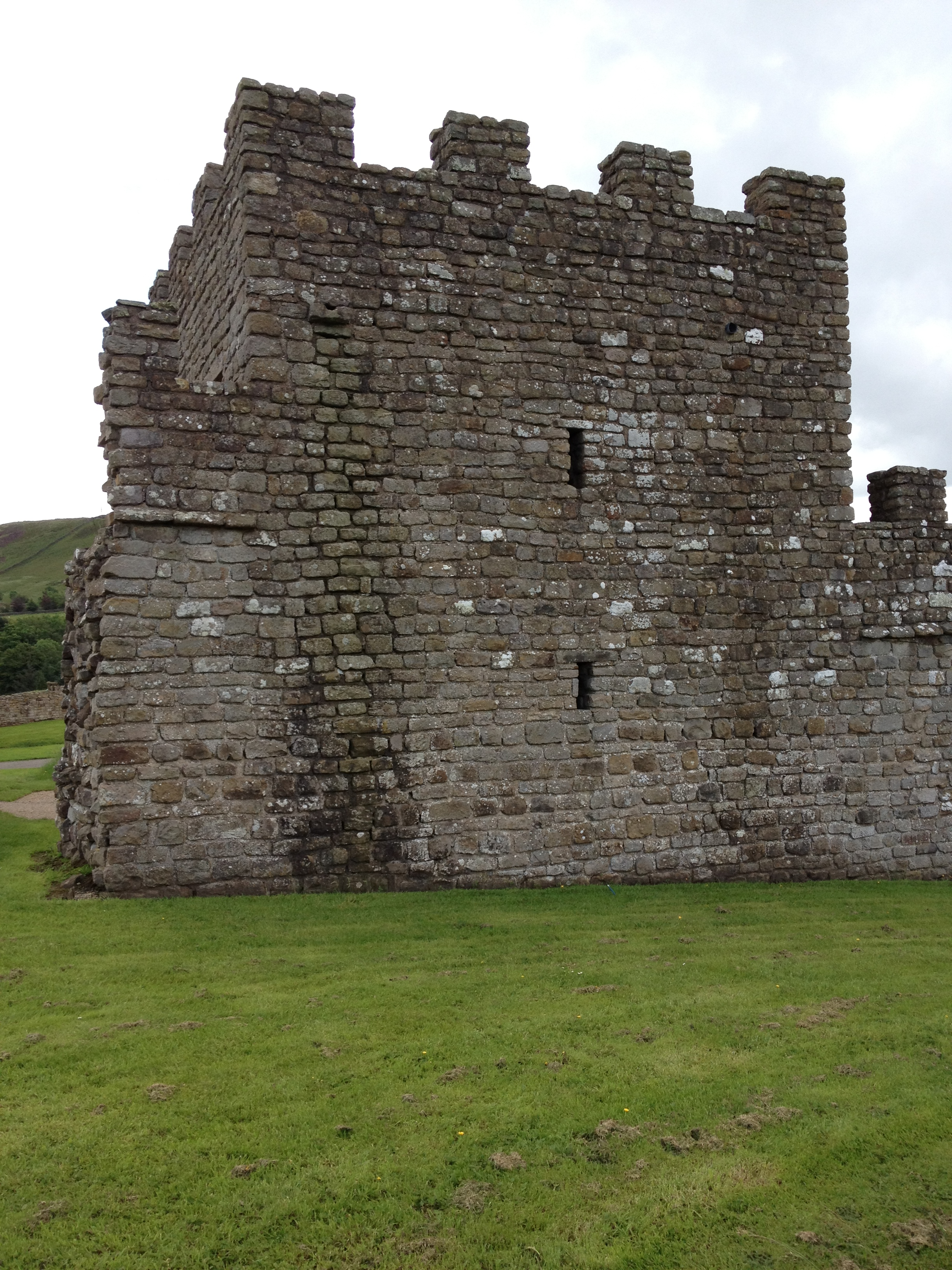
A reconstructed Hadrian's Wall stone wall turret at Vindolanda, just to the south of the actual Hadrian's Wall

A turret was a small watch tower, incorporated into the curtain wall of Hadrian's Wall. The turrets were normally spaced at intervals of one third of a Roman mile (equivalent to 495 metres (541 yd)) between Milecastles, giving two Turrets between each Milecastle.

== Numbering system and naming ==
In the numbering system introduced by John Collingwood Bruce in 1930, Turrets were numbered after the Milecastle located to the east of the turret. The nearest turret to the milecastle is suffixed by 'A', and the other turret by 'B'. For example, travelling west from Milecastle 33, the first Turret encountered would be Turret 33A, and the second would be Turret 33B. Both lower and upper case 'A' and 'B' suffixes are in widespread use, and the full name is often abbreviated to (for example) 'T33a'.

Many turrets also have a name, which is often shown in brackets following the number. For example, Brunton Turret is often referred to as 'Turret 26B (Brunton)'.

=== Turf Wall ===
Where the Turf Wall and Stone Walls diverge from one another (just to the east of Birdoswald), Milecastles and Turrets unique to the Turf Wall are given a 'TW' suffix, for example 'T50bTW'. A suffix of 'SW' may also be used to uniquely identify a turret as belonging to the 'Stone Wall'.

=== Cumbrian Coast ===
Although Hadrian's Wall itself ended (at its western terminus) just beyond the fort of Maia at the modern village of Bowness-on-Solway on the Cumbrian coast, the system of milecastles and turrets continued beyond this point, along the west coast as far as Flimby, with comparable spacing. However, the nomenclature adopted for the coastal Milecastle equivalent is 'Milefortlet', and the equivalent of the turret is here called a Tower. The numbering system adopted for the towers along the Cumbrian Coast is (for example) 'T21a CC' (the 'CC' suffix meaning 'Cumbrian Coast'), though the CC suffix is often not used if the reference is clear from the context, so care must be taken not to confuse (for example) 'T21a' meaning 'Turret 21a', and 'T21a' meaning 'Tower 21a'.

The first referenced tower is 'T0a CC' (just to the west of the Bowness on Solway), and the last is 'T25b CC'.

== Construction ==
=== Plan ===
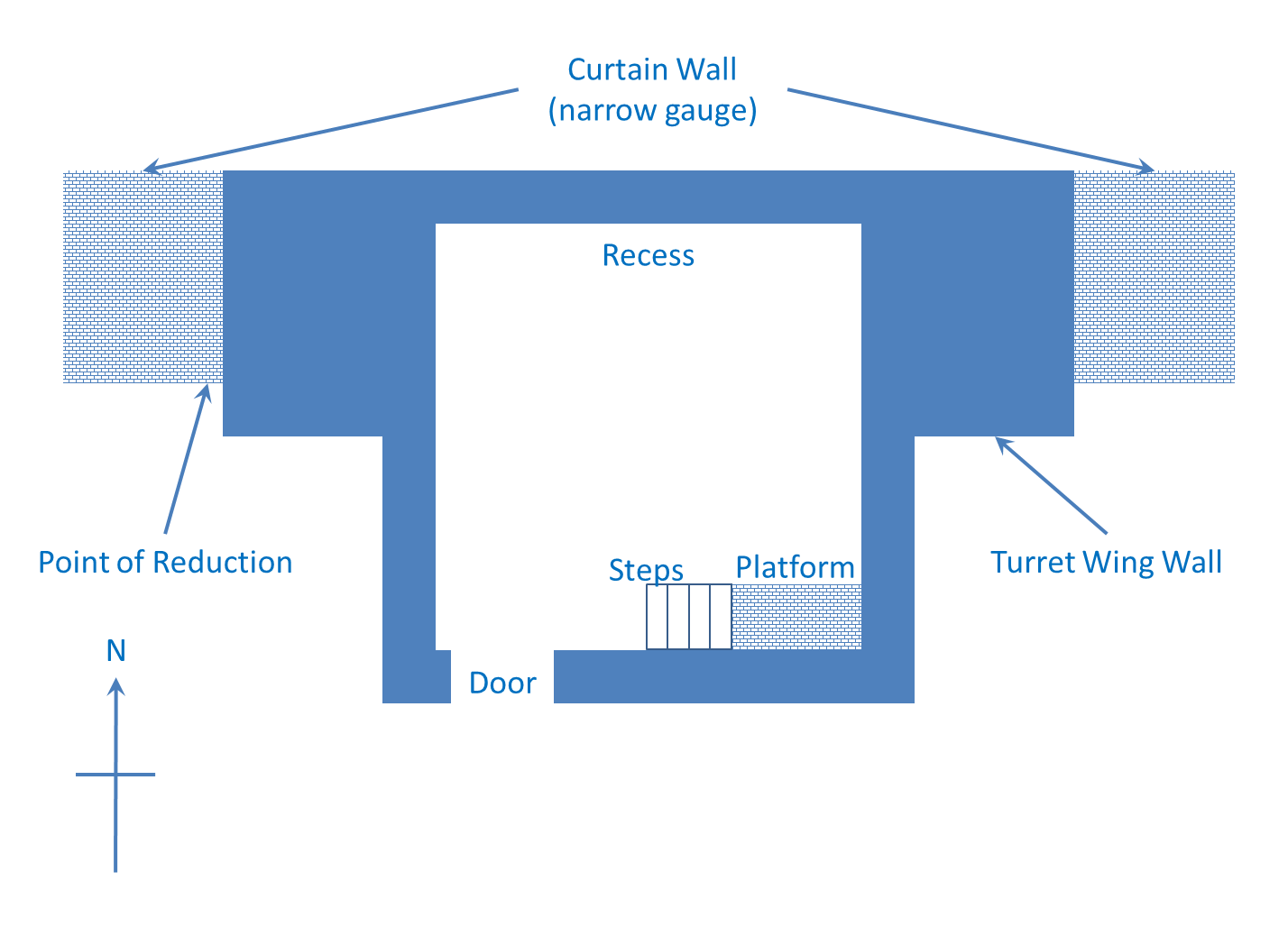
Typical layout of stone wall turret

Turrets were constructed of mortared stone (the exception being Turret 19B, which used clay). They were built to a square plan, usually around 20 Roman feet along a side, which is equivalent to 19 feet (5.8 m). Evidence suggests that the floors were originally clay (e.g. Turret 7B and Turret 10A), or clay and mortar (e.g. Turret 25B and Turret 26A). In many cases, later repairs to the floor had been made, either with stone (e.g. Turret 26A), or with flagstones (e.g. Turret 7B). Many turrets' floors had undergone subsequent (sometimes multiple) resurfacing, in some cases with sand (e.g. Turret 26A) and in some cases with flagstones (also Turret 26A). Turret 51B was found to have had straw as a floor covering, as had Tower 16B.

An access doorway was provided in the south wall (the east wall is the equivalent on the Cumbria Coast) of the turret, located either at the east or western end. These contained an outward opening door, above a stone threshold. Two threshold types have been identified: monolithic, or cut from a number of stones. Keys have been found at two of the towers along the Cumbrian Coast, but at no other turret.

The remains of hearths have been found in many turrets, though (unlike milecastles) no remains of ovens have been found. These were in no fixed position, and in some cases had been moved to different locations over time (e.g. Turret 10A), usually corresponding with a renewal of the floor. In at least one case (Turret 18B), the temperature at which the hearth had been operated, together with other finds at the site, suggested that the turret had been used as a workshop.

Several turrets have been identified that had paths leading to the door.

==== Variations: Stone Wall ====
On the stone wall, (in the same way as Milecastles,) additional structures known as Wing Walls were incorporated on the east and west side, allowing bonding to the curtain wall. This is interpreted as evidence that turrets (and milecastles) were constructed before the curtain wall. Where turrets were built with the intention of bonding to a broad gauge curtain wall, they were given broad wing walls. However, there are many cases where the curtain wall actually constructed was of narrow gauge, giving a point of reduction where the curtain wall and turret wing walls join. To facilitate bonding with the curtain wall, wing walls were constructed longer at the base, and stepping inwards as they were built upwards. Turrets thought to have been constructed later in the plan were built with much shorter wing walls.

Excepting the north wall, which is always thicker than the other three, two widths of turret wall have been identified: 2.5 feet (0.76 m), and 3.5 feet (1.1 m) thick (approx.), the thinner gauge often has an offset above the second course. The access doorways provided in the south wall of the turret were located either at the east or western ends of the south wall, though for those stone wall turrets with the thicker walls, only doorways at the eastern end have been located. This gives three turret types, based on wall thickness and door position:

- Narrower walls and an eastern door
- Narrower walls and a western door
- Broader walls and an eastern door

There is inconclusive evidence that the three turret types correspond to the three legions known to have been involved with the construction of the wall, as follows:

Wall	Door Position	Possible Responsible Legion
Narrow	East	Legio VI Victrix
Narrow	West	Legio XX Valeria Victrix
Broad	East	Legio II Augusta

In the other interior southern corner of the turret from the doorway, a stone platform was often built (thought to be secondary additions). The length of these structures varied between 7 feet (2.1 m) and 8 feet (2.4 m), the width was 3 feet (0.91 m), and the height (based on evidence from Turret 18A) was nearly 3 feet (0.91 m). There is no evident purpose for this structure, though the presence of four or five steps in some cases (where they have survived) suggests a possible platform for a ladder to access an upper floor.

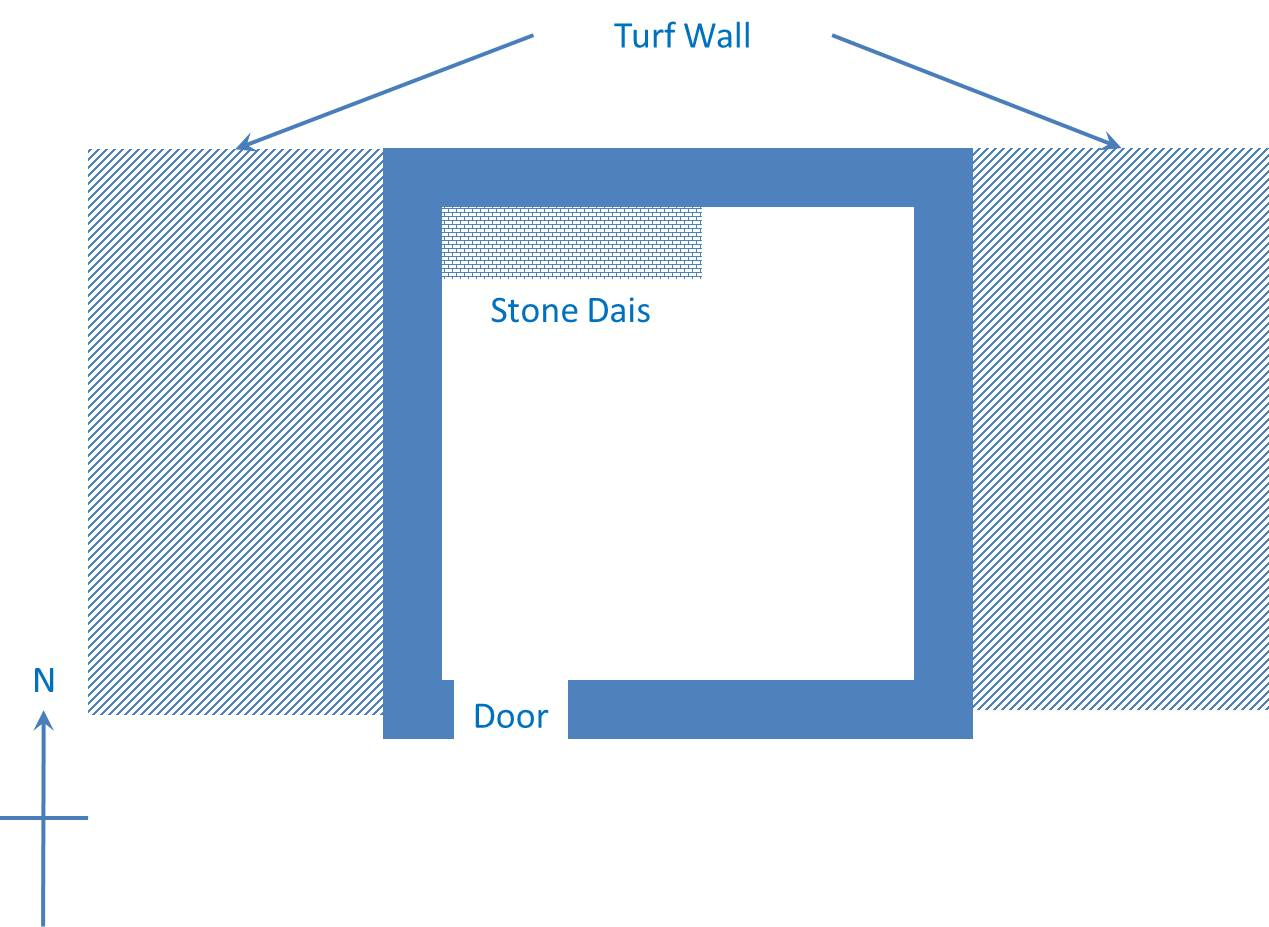
Plan of typical Turf Wall turret

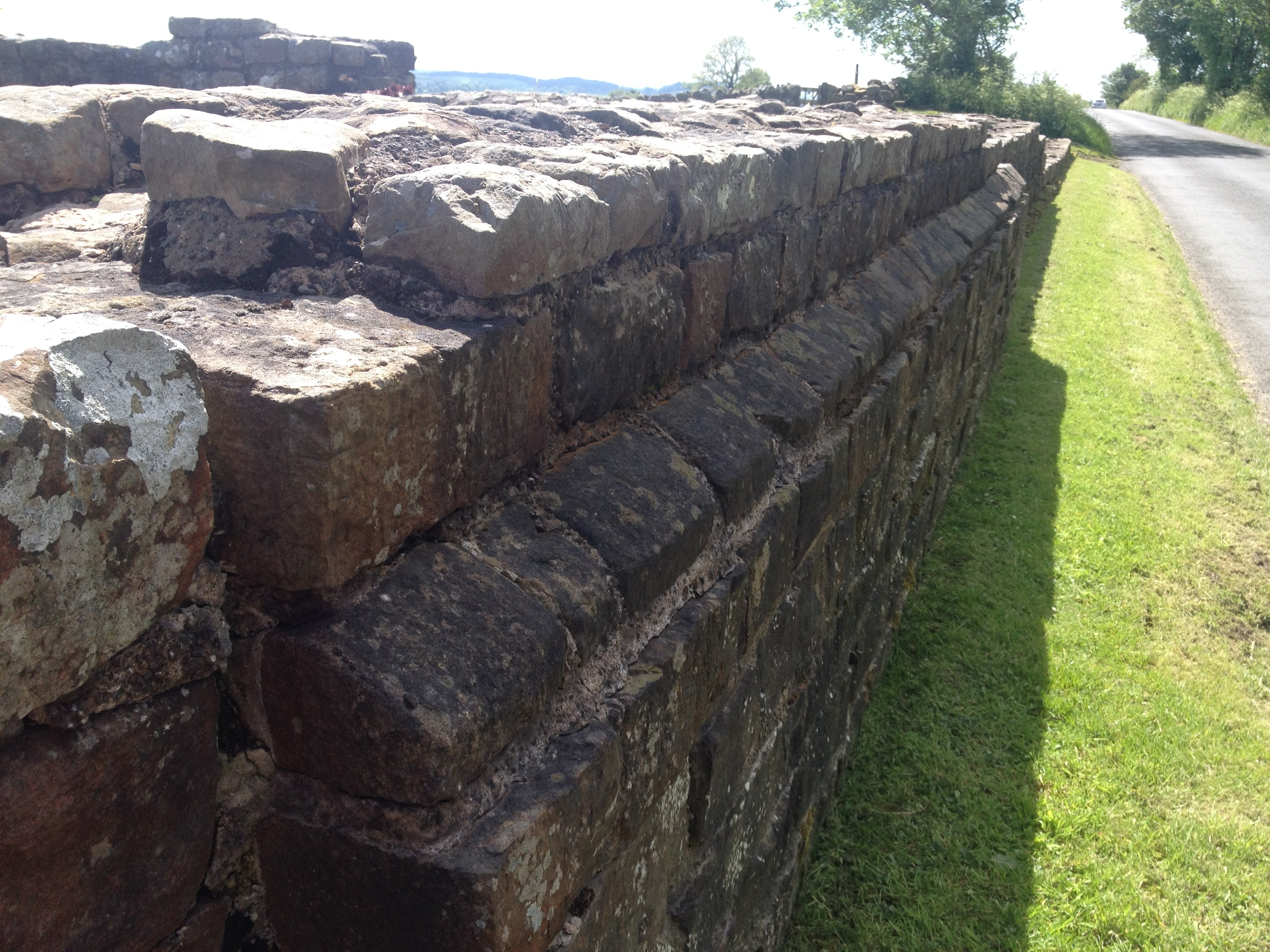
Photograph showing the plinth course on the outer north wall of Turret 52A (Banks East).

==== Variations: Turf Wall ====
Turrets built for the turf wall (unlike Milecastles built for the turf wall) were built of stone, though no wing walls were required for bonding to the turf wall. The turret walls themselves were thicker on the north and south walls, though the thickness reduced at a plinth course, presumably due to the slope of the turf wall.

Nothing equivalent to the platforms have been discovered against the south walls, though many have a low stone dais against the north wall. No evidence of steps associated with these structures has been found.

==== Variations: Cumbrian Coast ====
The towers of the Cumbrian Coast fortifications, like those on the turf wall, lacked wing walls (having no substantial curtain with which to bond).

Platforms, like those on the stone wall, have been found in two of the towers, along with evidence of steps.

=== Structure ===
Because only the lower courses of any turret currently exist, and no definitive description exists, the exact structure of the turrets on Hadrian's Wall is not known.

==== Height ====
The favoured value for the height of a turret is around 9 metres (30 ft) to the viewing platform. This was within the capabilities of the Roman engineers, and could be supported by the observed foundations, despite these foundations being significantly less deep than those used for the earlier Pike Hill Signal Tower.

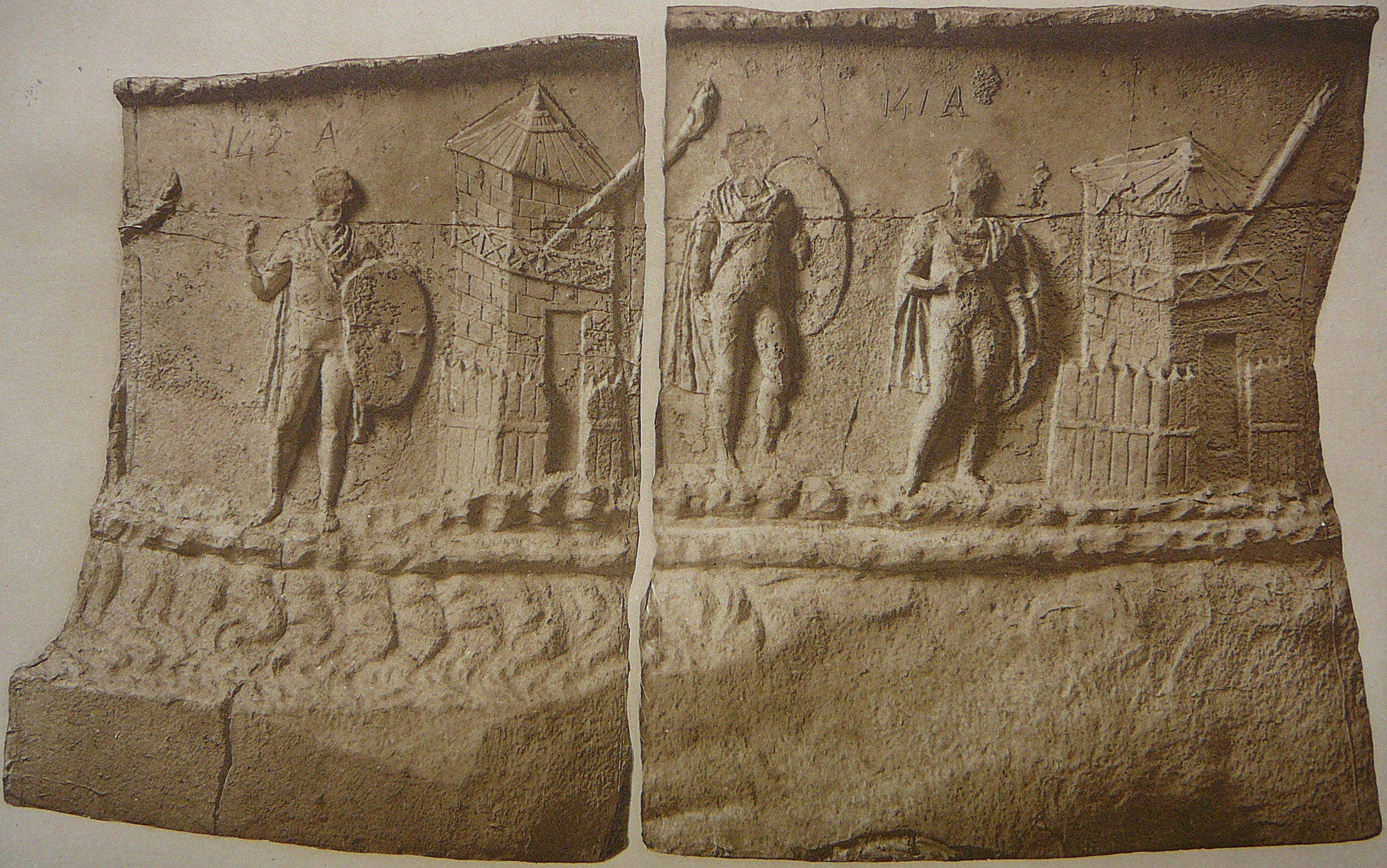
An image from near the base of Trajan's Column in Rome, showing signal towers surrounded by sharpened stakes, and displaying flaming beacons.

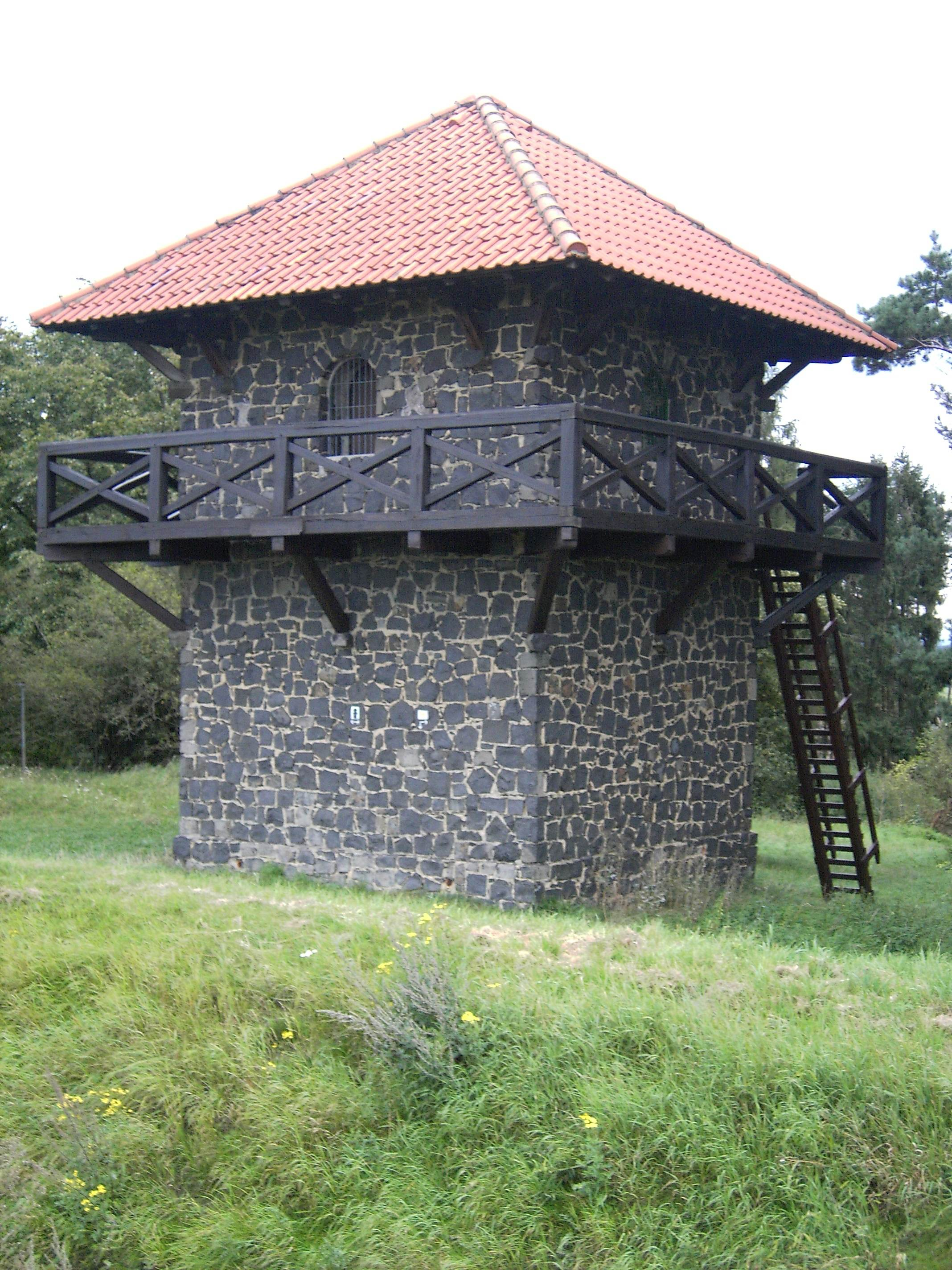
A reconstructed Roman Watchtower near the village of Grüningen in Germany. This is one possible design for Hadrian's Wall turrets, though clay tiles are less likely than slates or wooden shingles.

==== Roof ====
To an extent, a turret's height would be influenced by the design of the roof. Both the Rudge Cup and the Amiens Skillet exhibit a design indicative of Hadrian's Wall. Incorporated within the design are features thought to represent turrets, and these are shown with a crenellated area around the top. This design would require a viewing platform probably of flagstones, but these would lead to inherent difficulties in keeping the turret's interior dry, especially in the wetter climate of the time. Flagstones have been found in some turrets (e.g. Turret 29B, Turret 34A, and Turret 44B). These flags were 30 centimetres (0.98 ft) square by around 8 centimetres (3.1 in) thick.

Another possible design for the roof is suggested by the slightly earlier Trajan's Column, where watchtowers are shown with hipped (or pyramidal) roofs. In this design, a balcony is shown below the roof, acting as the observation platform. To maintain the equivalent viewing height as the flat roofed design, this design would necessitate a slightly higher tower. Physical evidence supporting this design comes in the form of both roof tiles fragments in a few turrets, and slates in some others.

The lack of physical evidence has led to suggestions that shingle or thatch could have been used, neither of which would leave significant physical remains. Similarly, timber roofs secured with wooden pegs may also have rotted away.

A similar design incorporating a gabled roof has also been suggested.

==== Windows ====
Nothing is known about the presence of windows in turrets, though window glass has been found in five of them. Also suggesting the presence of windows are accumulations of occupation debris (e.g. pottery) just outside the centre of the east wall of Turret 7B. Similar accumulations were found beside the west wall of Turret 25B.

== Occupation ==
=== Phases of occupation ===
The occupation of the turrets seems to have occurred in distinct phases. The first was the initial occupation immediately after construction (from 122 AD onwards), and remained in use after the construction of forts along the wall line. As with many of the Wall's defences, the turrets were abandoned in favour of the Antonine Wall around 142 AD. During this period of abandonment, many turrets were robbed of building stone, possibly by the remaining Roman garrisons.

On withdrawal from the Antonine Wall (around 162 AD), all turrets appear to have been extensively rebuilt (where robbing had taken place) and reoccupied. It was at this time that the Turf Wall was rebuilt in stone, and so new turrets were built on the realigned stretch west of Birdoswald. Very few, if any, of the towers on the Cumbrian coast were reoccupied at this time. Any that may have been are likely to have been abandoned in 180 AD along with much of the rest of the Cumbrian Coastal defences.

During the phase of occupation from 160 AD, a number of turrets fell out of use, and their doorways were blocked up. In the latter part of the second century, or early part of the third century, turrets in the central section of the stone wall (between Turrets 33B and 41B, and many others) were abandoned and demolished. During this process, the turret recess was filled in, presumably to remove a possible point of structural weakness.

Following the second century abandonment, there was a further and gradual abandonment of further turrets through the third century, with very few remaining in use into the fourth century. Late fourth century pottery has only been found at Turret 7B and, although inconclusive evidence of occupation, a coin of Valens was found at Turret 44B.

=== Purpose and Usage ===
There is no direct evidence of how the turrets were used, or what purpose they were intended to serve; however, it can be presumed that they were to provide regular observation posts. It is clear that the structures also provided temporary accommodation for soldiers manning them, though there is no evidence that the soldiers slept in them. It is more probable that they were based in the milecastles or forts, and manned the turrets in rotation. Given the presumed requirement to provide a reliable 24-hour watch, limited by the size of the structure, it is supposed that there may have been four to six soldiers stationed at a turret at any one time.

Despite the lack of an oven (like those found in milecastles), it is clear from finds, including quernstones, mixing bowls, cooking pots, jars and amphorae, that the soldiers cooked and ate there. Understandably, gaming boards and counters are regularly found.

== Reconstructions ==
A reconstruction stone wall turret (with flat roof and crenellated viewing platform) has been built as part of the stone wall reconstruction at Vindolanda.

== Notable turrets ==
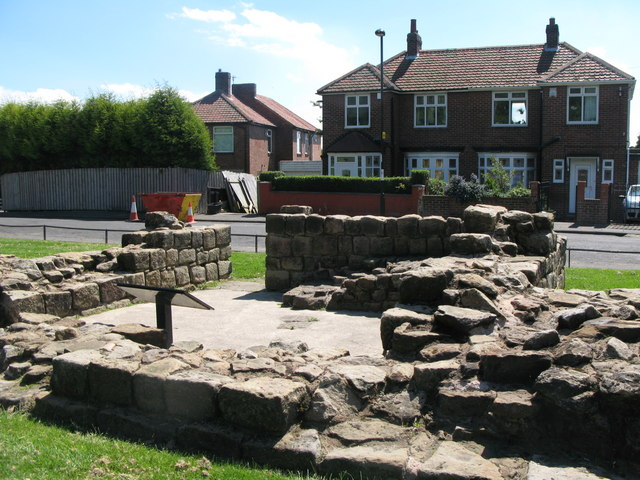
The remains of Turret 7B (Denton Hall)

Turret 7B (Denton Hall Turret or Denton Turret) is the most easterly extant turret. It stands up to six courses high and is made from sandstone. The turret was placed under English Heritage guardianship by 1971. It, and the attached wall, are maintained as a single property by English Heritage (known as "Denton Hall Turret"). The organisation operates the property as an open access site with no entrance fees.

Turret 25B (St Oswald's) is mainly notable as being one of the turrets showing evidence of a window, but also for the remains of 50 flagons found there.

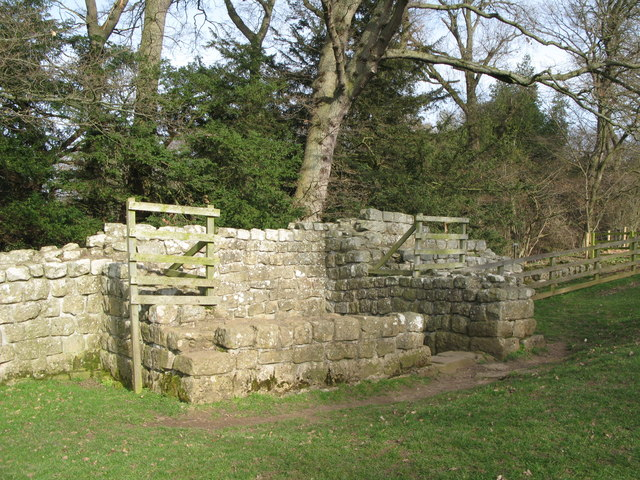
The remains of Turret 26B (Brunton Turret)

Turret 26B (Brunton) is the turret with the highest standing remains, being up to 2.8 metres (9.2 ft) high. It forms part of a 69 metres (226 ft) extant section of Hadrian's Wall.

Turret 27A was demolished soon after construction to allow the construction of Cilurnum (Chesters Roman Fort). Therefore, only its foundations exist, underlying the remains of the fort. They are located immediately to the east of the northwest corner of the fort's principia (headquarters block).

Turret 29B (Limestone Bank) remains as a low earthwork, turf covered with little (if any) visible masonry. The track connecting the turret to the Military Way can also be discerned. When excavated, roofing slabs (many pierced by nails) were found.

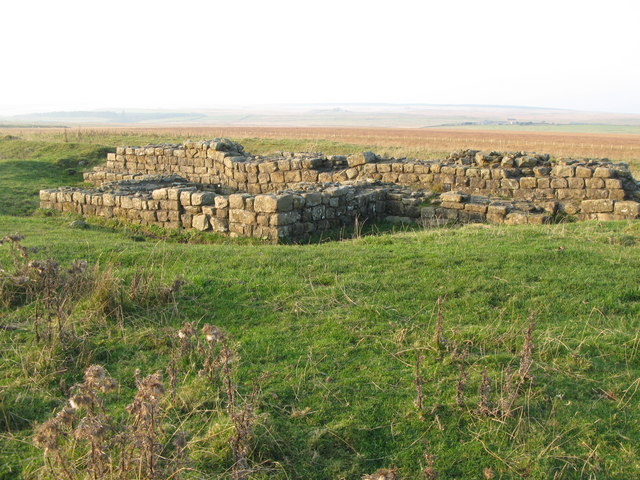
The remains of Turret 33B (Coesike)

Turret 33B (Coesike) has been exposed, and consolidated to a maximum height of 1.1 metres (3.6 ft), and extensive archeological work has been carried out on it. It shows clear evidence of the phases of occupation, including abandonment in favour of the Antonine Wall, demolition in the late second century, when the recess was filled. It is accessible from the Hadrian's Wall Path.

== Details of individual turrets ==
Details of individual turrets are recorded under each turret's milecastle (e.g. Turret 22A can be found at the entry for Milecastle 22).
