= Milecastle 17 =

- Northumberland, England, UK
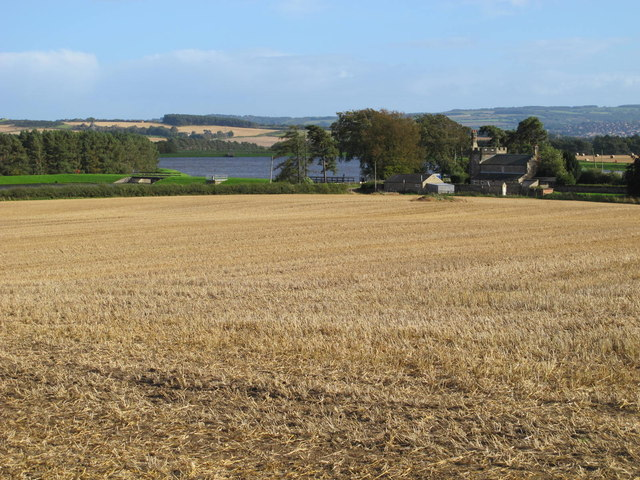
- The site of Milecastle 17

Location
- Location in Northumberland
- Coordinates: 55.00850°N 1.90303°W
- Grid reference: NZ06306822

Milecastle 17 (Welton/Whittledean) was a milecastle of the Roman Hadrian's Wall. The milecastle is located near to the Whittle Dene reservoirs and is visible as a platform in the ground. Just 174m west of the milecastle is a distinct change in wall construction, indicating that it may have formed a boundary between different legions. The existence of the milecastle has been known since at least 1732 and excavations have produced numerous finds and evidence of post-Roman occupation. The associated turrets both lie beneath the B3618 Military Road. A stone found near the milecastle is the only known written record of the name of Gaius Julius Marcus, a Roman Governor of Britain whose name has been erased from other inscriptions possibly because he fell out of favour with Emperor Caracalla.

== Construction ==
Milecastle 17 was a short-axis milecastle with Type I gateways. Short axis milecastles are thought to have been constructed by the Legio II Augusta who were based in Isca Augusta (Caerleon). The milecastle is located near to Welton, Northumberland and around 200 yards (180 m) from the Whittle Dene reservoirs from which it derives its common names. The remains of the milecastle are visible in the ground as a low platform 14.93m by 17.68m in size. Ploughing has reduced the size of the platform but it remains visible with a scarp on the eastern side and a scatter of stones to mark its position.

At a point on the wall 174m west of Milecastle 17 there is a significant change in construction, discovered in 1931. East of this point the wall is constructed at the thickness of the foundations for one course of stone before stepping in to a narrower wall, west of here the wall continues at full foundation thickness for three or four courses before stepping in. In addition the western part tends to use smaller stones, and east of Milecastle 17 until Turret 12A all turrets have east doors and thick walls, with those west until Turret 21A having doors in the western part of the south wall and thinner walls. These differences has been attributed to a boundary between two legions engaged in construction of the wall.

A milestone used to stand to the east of the milecastle, erected in AD 213. This stone is now missing but amounts to the only written record of the name of Gaius Julius Marcus, a governor of Roman Britain. During this year it is known that Marcus made a large number of inscriptions declaring his loyalty to the paranoid emperor Caracalla. In every other case apart from the milestone his name has been erased. Roman historian Guy de la Bédoyère has proposed that Marcus may have been subsequently arrested, convicted of treason and executed on Caracalla's orders as happened to the governor of Gallia Narbonensis that same year.

== Excavations and investigations ==
- 1732 – Location of milecastle identified by Horseley.
- 1858 – Horseley's location was confirmed by Henry MacLauchlan.
- 1867 – The milecastle was located and identified by Bruce.
- Pre 1931 – Investigations on the northern portion of the milecastle by Hepple showed it to be a short-axis milecastle with type I gateways. Three courses of stone (up to 0.8m in height) were discovered on the 3.3m wide north wall. The side walls were discovered to be 2.41m thick.
- 1931 – Excavations by Birley, Brewis and Simpson confirmed the narrow side walls and recorded the dimensions of the milecastle as 53 feet (16 m) east to west and 49 feet (15 m) north to south. The west half of the northern gateway was said to have been in good condition, with the liner of the pivothole being found and deposited in the Black Gate Museum.
- 14 July 1997 – The milecastle structure was designated a Scheduled Ancient Monument.
- 1999 – Milecastles Project studied it, 2 trenches excavated on the platform showed it was deeply buried in colluvium. Evidence for activity outside the walls existed with a gully and pit which probably dated to the Roman era. Inside the milecastle most deposits were post-Roman including probable remains of a post-medieval barn.
- 1999 – The Centre for Archaeology undertook an interim assessment of the milecastle. The investigation reported that a very clear, distinct terrace could be seen in the ground. Two trenches were dug in the area. The first was a 6m by 2m trench outside the milecastle which showed a linear gully and a shallow pit which were dated to the Roman period by a pottery sherd. The second trench was 8m long and 2m wide and crossed the west wall of the milecastle, it showed the structure to be buried beneath a deep layer of hillwash. Post-Roman walls were found to have been built within the milecastle, which were presumed to have been gone by the 19th century as they are not mentioned by earlier reports. Finds included pottery, charcoal, coal, slag, tiles, cattle bones and fired clay. An unfinished 3rd century jet ring was discovered that was probably made in Whitby.

== Associated turrets ==
Each milecastle on Hadrian's Wall had two associated turret structures. These turrets were positioned approximately one-third and two-thirds of a Roman mile to the west of the Milecastle, and would probably have been manned by part of the milecastle's garrison. The turrets associated with Milecastle 17 are known as Turret 17A and Turret 17B.

=== Turret 17A ===
Turret 17A (Welton East) became a Scheduled Ancient Monument on 14 July 1997. The site was excavated in 1931 when a door was located in the southwest corner, the access ladder platform in the southeast and an additional platform in the northwest. One of the finds discovered in 1931 was a whinstone ballista ball. There are no visible surface remains, the site now lying beneath the B3618 Military Road.

Location: 55.008688°N 1.911003°W

=== Turret 17B ===
Turret 17B (Horsley) was scheduled at the same time as Turret 17A. 17B was located on 11 June 1931 and excavated later that year. It was found to be similar to 17A with a door at the southwest and a ladder platform in the southeast and lies beneath the B3618, leaving no visible surface traces of its existence.

Location: 55.009233°N 1.918507°W

== Monument records ==
Monument	Monument Number	English Heritage Archive Number
Milecastle 17	20396	NZ 06 NE 8
Turret 17A	20399	NZ 06 NE 9
Turret 17B	20402	NZ 06 NE 10
