= Milecastle 35 =

Historic site in England

- Consolidated remains of Milecastle 35

- Location within Northumberland
- 55.025812°N 2.306637°W
- Type: Milecastle
- Location: Northumberland, England

Milecastle 35 (Sewingshields) is one of the milecastles on Hadrian's Wall (grid reference NY80497018). The remains still exist as exposed masonry.

== Description ==
The remains of Milecastle 35 are on the east-facing slope of Sewingshields Crags and survive as stone foundations. The milecastle measures 18.3 metres by 15.2 metres internally and its walls are up to 3.2 metres wide. A Roman branch road running south from Milecastle 35 to join the Military Way survives as a low agger up to 5.5 metres wide and up to 20 centimetres high.

== Construction ==
Milecastle 35 was a long-axis milecastle with a Type IV gateway (south gate).

== Excavations ==
Milecastle 35 was excavated in 1947 and again between 1978 and 1980 (with an additional week in 1982). Several phases of internal buildings were detected. Phase I consisted of a small building 4.25 metres by 7.45 metres with stone footings. Phase II, probably dating to the late 2nd or early 3rd century, consisted of a new buildings on the east and west side. The site then fell into disrepair. Phase III consisted of new buildings, somewhat crudely constructed, with considerable industrial activity. Phase IV consisted of some new stone footings placed over previous metal-working areas.

The site was reoccupied in the late medieval period (13th to 16th century), when two substantial longhouse buildings were built. The medieval remains were removed during excavations.

== Associated turrets ==
Remains of Turret 35A

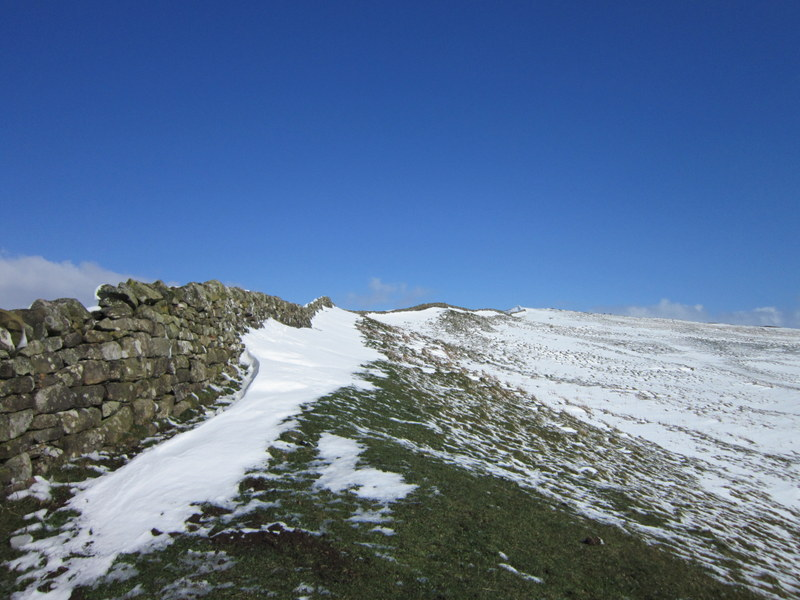
Approximate site of Turret 35B

Each milecastle on Hadrian's Wall had two associated turret structures. These turrets were positioned approximately one-third and two-thirds of a Roman mile to the west of the Milecastle, and would probably have been manned by part of the nearest milecastle's garrison. The turrets associated with Milecastle 35 are known as Turret 35A and Turret 35B.

=== Turret 35A ===
Turret 35A (Sewingshields Crag) (grid reference NY80087008) exists as a consolidated structure. The turret measures 3.7 metres by 2.4 metres internally, and the walls are up to 0.75 metres high. It was excavated in 1958. A rough inscribed slab was found 19 metres east of the Turret in the 1958 excavations.

=== Turret 35B ===
Turret 35B (Busy Gap) (grid reference NY79906973) is at the top of the ridge before the descent into Busy Gap. It was located in 1913 and excavated in 1946. The excavations showed that the turret had narrow walls and a door to the east. There are no visible remains above ground except for an earthwork platform measuring 3.8 metres by 5.5 metres and up to 0.5 metres high.

== Monument records ==
Monument	Monument Number	English Heritage Archive Number
Milecastle 35	16829	NY 87 SW 10
Medieval buildings	938892	NY 87 SW 34
Turret 35A	16832	NY 87 SW 11
Inscribed slab	952053	NY 87 SW 36
Turret 35B	15134	NY 76 NE 1

== Public access ==
The milecastle, Turret 35A, and the site of Turret 35B, are all accessible via the Hadrian's Wall Path.
