= Milecastle 33 =

Milecastle on Hadrian's Wall in England

- Northumberland, England, UK
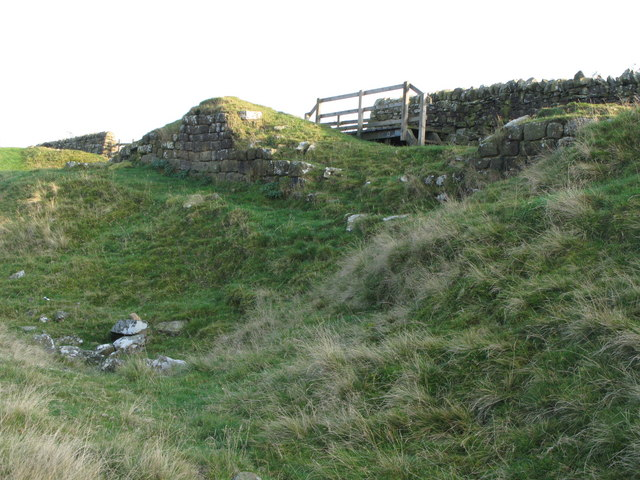
- Milecastle 33 from the north

Location
- Location in Northumberland
- Coordinates: 55.030867°N 2.266110°W
- Grid reference: NY83087073

Milecastle 33 (Shield on the Wall) was a milecastle of the Roman Hadrian's Wall, one of a series of small fortlets built at intervals of approximately one Roman mile along the length of the UNESCO World Heritage Site in northern England.

Its remains exist as clearly visible earthworks, with the exception of part of the north gate and wall, and a fragment of the south gate, which are exposed. Exposed parts survive to a maximum height of 1.2 metres (3 ft 11 in) (north wall). The remains are located a few metres to the north of the B6318 Military Road.

== Construction ==
Milecastle 33 was a long-axis milecastle with Type II gateways. Such milecastles were thought to have been constructed by the legio XX Valeria Victrix who were based in Deva Victrix (Chester). The external dimensions of the milecastle are 78 feet (24 m) by 68 feet (21 m), and the large, monolithic threshold installed is of the same type installed in milecastles 13, 17, and 53.

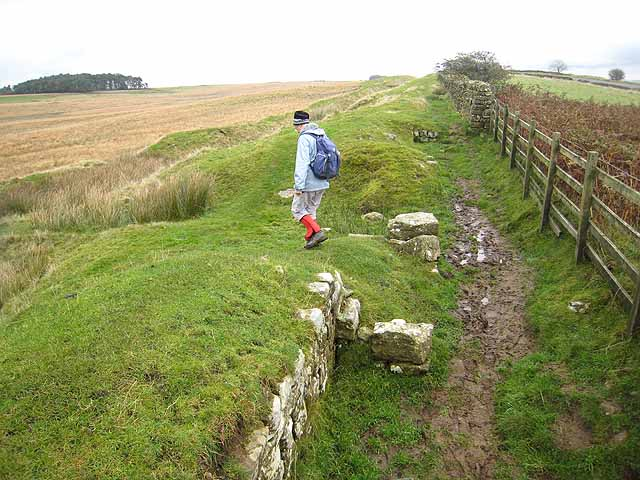
Remains of the north gateway

== Excavations and investigations ==
- 1930 – A fragment of ornamented stone with a distinct pattern of leaves is found at the North gate.
- 1935–36 – The milecastle is excavated, and the dimensions and remaining structure established.
- 1966 – English Heritage Field Investigation. The 1935–36 findings were reconfirmed.
- 1988 – English Heritage Field Investigation as part of the Hadrian's Wall Project. It was noted that the maximum height of surviving masonry (at the north wall) was 1.2 metres (3 ft 11 in). Other previous findings are reconfirmed.

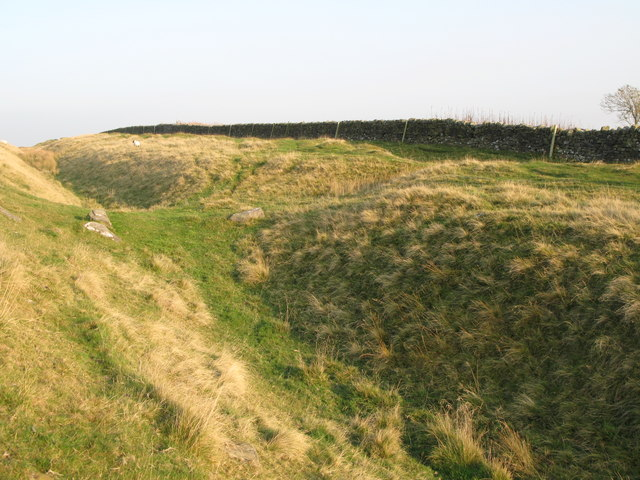
The site of Turret 33A

== Associated turrets ==
Each milecastle on Hadrian's Wall had two associated turret structures. These turrets were positioned approximately one-third and two-thirds of a Roman mile to the west of the Milecastle, and would probably have been manned by part of the milecastle's garrison. The turrets associated with Milecastle 33 are known as Turret 33A and Turret 33B.

=== Turret 33A ===
Located in 1920, nothing now remains of Turret 33A, due to extensive stone robbing. Its position was stated by Eric Birley in 1961 as "150 yds. east of the twenty-seventh milestone at the bridge crossing the Coesike".

Location on Ordnance Survey 1:25 000 map: 55.030132°N 2.273380°W

=== Turret 33B ===
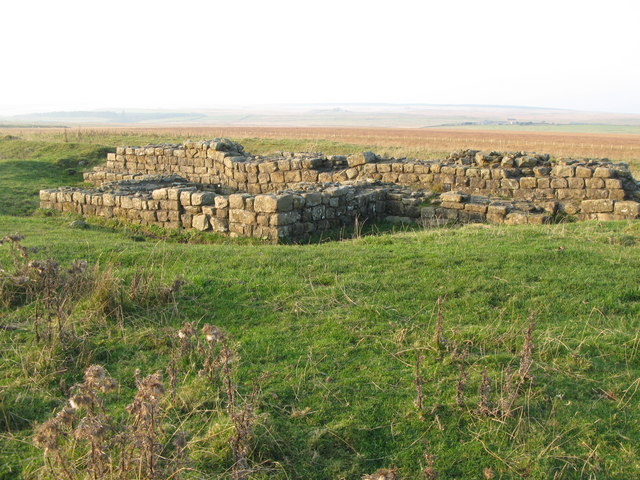
The remains of Turret 33B

Turret 33B (Coesike) is located approximately 150 metres (490 ft) west of the point where the wall line and the B6318 Military Road diverge. It has been exposed, and consolidated to a maximum height of 1.1 metres (3 ft 7 in). In plan, the turret has an entrance to the east end of the south wall, with a platform in the south-west corner, and a hearth at the centre. The walls are 0.9 metres (2 ft 11 in) thick. It was built with broad wing walls of Standard A, which join to a narrow gauge wall at this reach. Material used for the blocking of the rear recess mentioned below included an inscribed stone naming the Legio VI Victrix. This suggests that this legion were responsible for the original construction.

There is evidence that the following changes occurred during occupation:

- The hearth was replaced twice (evidenced by ashes spilling on the surrounding floor)
- The floor was raised and part-flagged
- The threshold of the door was lifted
- The turret was abandoned, then reoccupied following withdrawal from the Antonine Wall
- The door was blocked at the end of the second century, when the turret apparently went out of use.
- Subsequently, the turret was demolished down to four courses and the recess in the rear of the wall blocked up.

Occupation evidence includes jars and cooking pots (Hadrianic), butchered remains of young animals (cows, sheep and pigs), and the dumping of ashes from the hearth outside the east wall.

Location on Ordnance Survey 1:25 000 map: 55.029189°N 2.281070°W

== Monument records ==
Monument	Monument Number	English Heritage Archive Number
Milecastle 33	16809	NY 87 SW 4
Turret 33A	16812	NY 87 SW 5
Turret 33B	16815	NY 87 SW 6

== Public access ==
The milecastle, the site of Turret 33A, and Turret 33B, are all accessible via the Hadrian's Wall Path.

== Bibliography ==
- Daniels, Charles (1979), "Review: Fact and Theory on Hadrian's Wall", Britannia, 10: 357–364, doi:10.2307/526069, JSTOR 526069
