= Milecastle 34 =

Milecastle on Hadrian's Wall in Northumberland, England

- Northumberland, England, UK
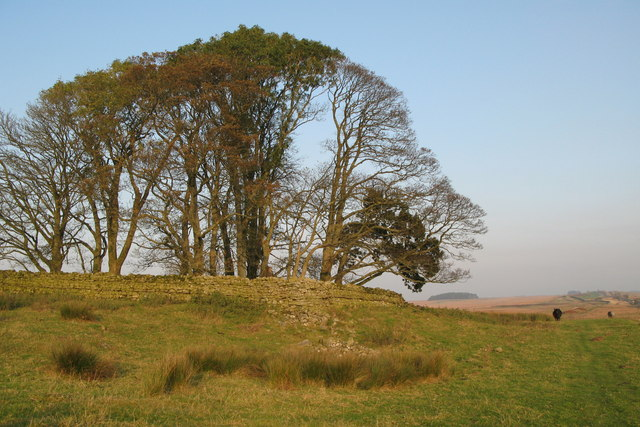
- The walled plantation marking the site of Milecastle 34

Location
- Location in Northumberland
- Coordinates: 55.028706°N 2.287715°W
- Grid reference: NY81707050

Milecastle 34 (Grindon) was a milecastle of the Roman Hadrian's Wall. There are no visible remains, but the site is within a small, tree-filled, walled enclosure located around 0.5 kilometres (0.31 mi) east of Sewingshields farm.

== Construction ==
Milecastle 34 was a long-axis milecastle with Type II gateways. Such milecastles were thought to have been constructed by the legio XX Valeria Victrix who were based in Deva Victrix (Chester).

== Excavations and investigations ==
- 1947 – The axis and type are established.
- 1965 – English Heritage Field Investigation. Lack of visible remains was noted, and the location within the enclosure confirmed.
- 1988 – English Heritage Field Investigation as part of Hadrian's Wall project. Previous findings were confirmed

== Associated turrets ==
Each milecastle on Hadrian's Wall had two associated turret structures. These turrets were positioned approximately one-third and two-thirds of a Roman mile to the west of the Milecastle, and would probably have been manned by part of the milecastle's garrison. The turrets associated with Milecastle 34 are known as Turret 34A and Turret 34B.

=== Turret 34A ===
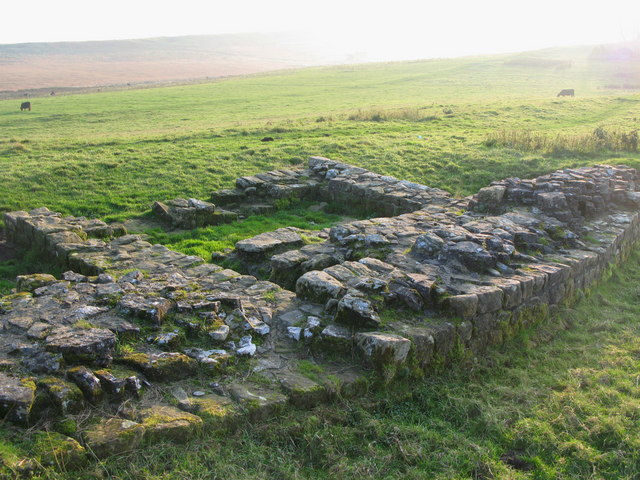
Turret 34A

Turret 34A (Grindon West) exists as a consolidated structure, and is located in the expected position, just to the east of Sewingshields farm. It is constructed with narrow walls (approximately 0.95 metres (3 ft 1 in) thick) having a mortar core. Like some milecastles, it has unusually short wing walls (0.9 metres (2 ft 11 in) long and 0.6 metres (2 ft 0 in) deep), suggesting it was constructed late in the scheme. The cores of both the wall (at this point), and the turret's wing walls are of large whinstone blocks. There is a suggestion of a platform in the southwest corner, and the door is at the east side of the south wall. it is 1.15 metres (3 ft 9 in) in width, with a surviving (though worn and cracked) threshold stone, showing visible seating for stone jambs and pivot hole. The turret's internal dimensions are 3.9 metres (13 ft) east/west by 2.3 metres (7 ft 7 in). Outside the turret, a path consisting of small stones and amphora fragments was discovered leading to the door.

Consolidation was carried out initially by FG Simpson in 1912, and then by the Ministry of Works (which at the time was being absorbed by the Department of the Environment) to a height of 0.6 metres (2 ft 0 in), in 1971.

The structure was partly dug by FG Simpson in 1913, though results were not published. It was further excavated in 1947 and 1958, and then in 1971 by D Charlesworth, for the Department of the Environment. The precise date of the end of the structure's occupation (late 2nd or early 3rd century) could not be established, but at this point the recess was blocked up (with blocking 1.2 metres (3 ft 11 in) thick), and the turret demolished. Finds included a javelin-head, a brooch, a coin of Vespasian, and Samian ware. Three scattered hearths were found (later replaced by one), along with a litter of bones and pot sherds, (mostly from cooking-pots). The recovery of green-glazed ware from the site provided evidence of occupation during the medieval period.

Location on Ordnance Survey 1:25 000 map: 54.993672°N 1.736733°W (Ordnance Survey National Grid Coordinates: NY 8127 7043)

=== Turret 34B ===
The measured site of Turret 34B is overlaid by a farmhouse at Sewingshields Farm (itself built of Roman stone). Therefore, there are no visible remains.

Predicted location: 55.026726°N 2.300230°W (Ordnance Survey National Grid Coordinates: NY 8090 7028)

== Monument records ==
Monument	Monument Number	English Heritage Archive Number
Milecastle 34	16820	NY 87 SW 7
Turret 34A	16821	NY 87 SW 8
Turret 34B	16826	NY 87 SW 9

== Public access ==
Both the milecastle and turret 34A are readily accessible from the Hadrian's Wall Path. Having been built over, turret 34B is not accessible.

== Bibliography ==
- Daniels, Charles (1979), "Review: Fact and Theory on Hadrian's Wall", Britannia, 10: 357–364, doi:10.2307/526069, JSTOR 526069
