= Military Way =

Military Way may refer to:

- Roman Military Way (Hadrian's Wall)
- Roman Military Way (Antonine Wall) on the Antonine Wall
- The 18th-century highway, Military Road (Northumberland), also running near Hadrian's Wall
