= Milecastle 19 =

Milecastle on Hadrian's Wall

- Northumberland, England, UK
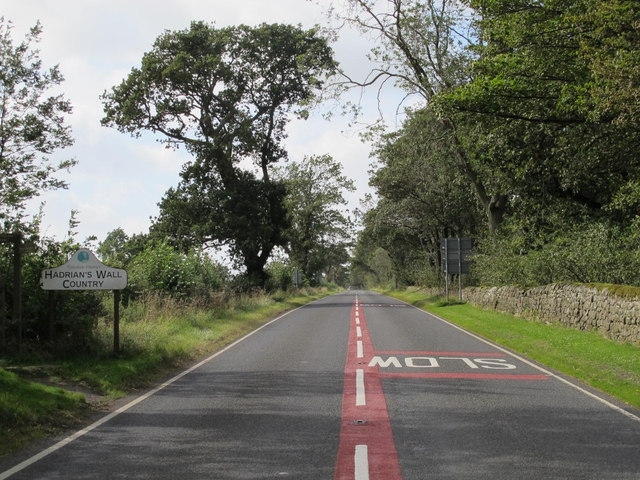
- The line of Hadrian's Wall (beneath the modern road) just to the west of Milecastle 19

Location
- Location in Northumberland
- Coordinates: 55.011316°N 1.949307°W
- Grid reference: NZ 0334 6853

Milecastle 19 (Matfen Piers) was a milecastle of the Roman Hadrian's Wall. Sited just to the east of the hamlet of Matfen Piers, the milecastle is today covered by the B6318 Military Road. The milecastle is notable for the discovery of an altar by Eric Birley in the 1930s. An inscription on the altar is one of the few dedications to a mother goddess found in Roman Britain, and was made by members of the First Cohort of Varduli from northern Spain. The presence of the Vardulians at this milecastle has led to debate amongst archaeologists over the origins of troops used to garrison the wall. A smaller altar was found at one of the two associated turrets.

== Construction ==
Milecastle 19 was a long-axis milecastle with Type III gateways. Such milecastles were thought to have been constructed by the legio VI Victrix who were based in Eboracum (York). The milecastle lies 150 metres (160 yd) east of the hamlet of Matfen Piers on a section of the narrow wall and, though part of it lies beneath the modern Military Road, is visible as a substantial rise in the hedgerow and as a 0.15m high platform in a cereal field to the south of the road. The milecastle measures 16.25 metres (17.77 yd) east to west and 17.2 metres (18.8 yd) north to south. It is known to be situated on an outcrop of degraded sandstone, either naturally occurring or placed for this purpose.

== Excavations and investigations ==
- 1858 – The low platform marking the milecastle is noted by Henry MacLauchlan in his survey of the wall.
- 1867 – John Collingwood Bruce also notes the presence of a platform in his book The Roman Wall.
- 1931–32 – Excavated by Eric Birley and the North of England Excavation Committee during work on the Carlisle to Newcastle road. The north gate was found to have vanished, though its foundations remained, and a hearth discovered at the western side of the southern end of the passage suggested that this gate was partially blocked during the Roman era. The only side wall to remain was part of the western passage wall, though footings indicated that this milecastle had type III gates, and a 2.38 metres (2.60 yd) south wall suggested a narrow wall construction. A Roman altar was discovered immediately outside the south gate of the milecastle.
- 1935 – Excavated by Frank G. Simpson.
- 1980s – The wall of an internal building within the milecastle was exposed by ploughing.
- 14 July 1997 – The milecastle was scheduled as an ancient monument.
- 1999 – An excavation is undertaken by English Heritage consisting of two trenches, one through the eastern wall and interior and one through the southern wall. The eastern wall was noticeably robbed but found to be of stone, bonded by clay, with a rubble core. The excavation discovered that the floor was made of sandy clay or else this formed the basis for a later earthen floor, and that it was cobbled in the western portion of the interior. Finds recovered included some ironwork, modern glass, an animal bone, one Roman Sestertius of Emperor Hadrian dating from AD 125–138 and pottery (some pre-Roman, but mostly 2nd/3rd century AD). The archaeologists were able to confirm that the milecastle was of narrow wall construction. The milecastle was noted to have been damaged by ploughing.

The altar discovered, in a 2nd-century AD context, in the 1930s led Birley to suggest that there was a shrine located nearby or that the milecastle had later been converted to religious use. The size of the altar suggests that the temple would have been very small.

Though altars are not uncommon on Hadrian's Wall, there are 13 other altars or tombs located near to milecastles, it is an inscription on the altar at Milecastle 19 that makes it important to Roman historians. The inscription reads "MATRIB TEMPL CVM ARA VEX COH I VARD INSTANTE P D V VSLM" which translates as "to the Mother Goddesses, this temple with its altarstone [was built by] a detachment of the First Cohort of Varduli, under P[ublius] D[omitius?] V[?], willingly and deservedly fulfilling their vow".

The dedication to the Matres, or mother goddesses is one of only 60 known from Roman Britain. The First Cohort of Varduli are also mentioned in inscriptions at the Antonine Wall, Longovicium in Durham, Bremenium and Corstopitum in Northumberland and on the Dere Street in Cappuck in the Scottish Borders. The Vardullians are known to have been present at Corbridge in the AD 160s. The inscription has led to debate amongst archaeologists as to whether Hadrian's Wall was manned by Roman legionaries or men of the non-citizen auxilia or numeri. Birley suggested that those soldiers who were tasked with manning the wall were drawn from separate units from those who manned the supporting forts. The altar itself is recorded as a separate monument to the milecastle by English Heritage and is now in the collection of the Durham University Museum of Archaeology.

The wall at Milecastle 19 was less than 2.44 metres (8.0 ft) wide, with a noticeable stepped reduction in wall thickness just 27.5 metres (90 ft) east of the milecastle. This step occurred between the second and third courses and is thought to indicate a later repair of the wall. A causeway used to be visible across the vallum to the south of the milecastle. An English Heritage report in the late 1990s found that MC19 was one of only two milecastles being actively damaged by agriculture (the other being Milecastle 9) and that it had almost totally been destroyed through farming.

== Associated turrets ==
Each milecastle on Hadrian's Wall had two associated turret structures. These turrets were positioned approximately one-third and two-thirds of a Roman mile to the west of the Milecastle, and would probably have been manned by part of the milecastle's garrison. The turrets associated with Milecastle 19 are known as Turret 19A and Turret 19B.

=== Turret 19A ===
Turret 19A (East Clarewood) lies beneath the modern Military Road, though 5 metres (16 ft) of rough stone walling, 0.8 metres (2.6 ft) high, remains visible within a hedge. The door was thought to lie at the western end of the turret's south wall. The turret was apparently dismantled by the Romans, with the latest evidence of occupation being some pottery of 200 AD. It was examined by Birley in 1932, who found pottery dating only to the 2nd century AD, and found to be of the same construction as Turrets 18A and B except that the recess was blocked up with walls founded on earlier occupation earth. A doorjamb and hypocaust pillar were found to have been incorporated into the wall. Irregularities in the vallum to the south of Turret 19A were once visible, consisting of gaps in the southern mound that were protected by an additional mound outside of the line in the manner of a traverse. Turret 19A was scheduled as an ancient monument at the same time as the milecastle.

Location on Ordnance Survey 1:25 000 map: 55.011858°N 1.956812°W

=== Turret 19B ===
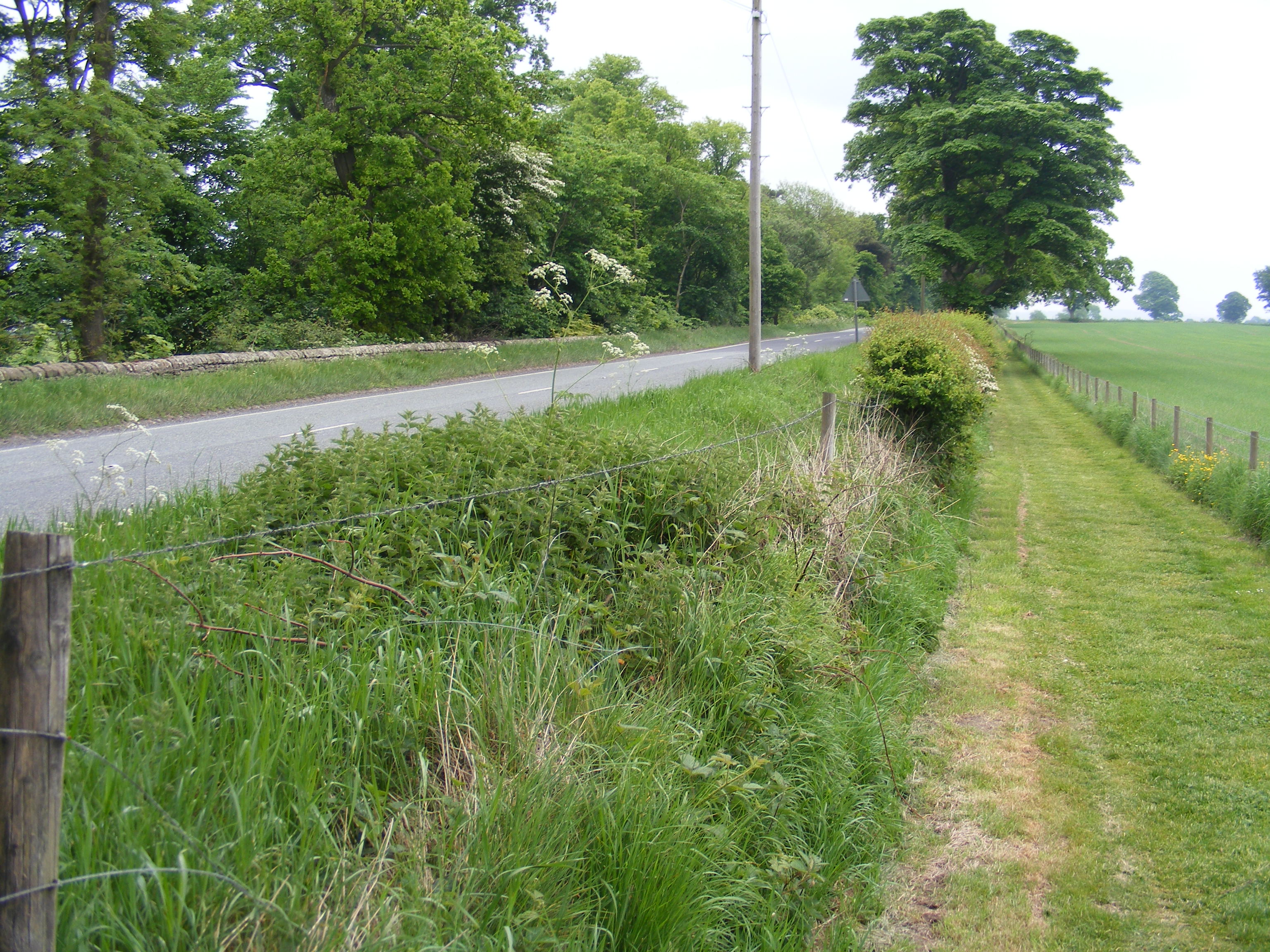
The site of Turret 19B next to the Military Road, marked by nettle growth, a sign of human habitation.

Turret 19B (West Clarewood) also lies beneath the modern Military Road, with no visible remains, and was excavated in 1932. This turret was constructed mainly with clay rather than mortar and has wider walls than normally found on narrow wall turrets, being 2.97 metres (9.7 ft) thick. The door was proven to lie at the western end of the south wall and a small and uninscribed altar was discovered beneath a floor of flagstones. The altar showed reliefs of a jug, cleaver, knife and phallus and was located below the last surviving floor level. East of the turret gaps are once more noticeable in the southern mound of the vallum. The turret is thought to have been abandoned during the 2nd century AD. Turret 19B was scheduled by English Heritage along with the milecastle, the altar is scheduled separately

Location on Ordnance Survey 1:25 000 map: 55.012310°N 1.964474°W

== Monument records ==
Monument	Monument Number	English Heritage Archive Number
Milecastle 19	20455	NZ 06 NW 4
Turret 19A	20458	NZ 06 NW 5
Turret 19B	20461	NZ 06 NW 6
Inscribed altar associated with milecastle	1004321	NZ 06 NW 26
Uninscribed altar found at Turret 19B	1004325	NZ 06 NW 27
