= John Gay (photographer) =

British photographer

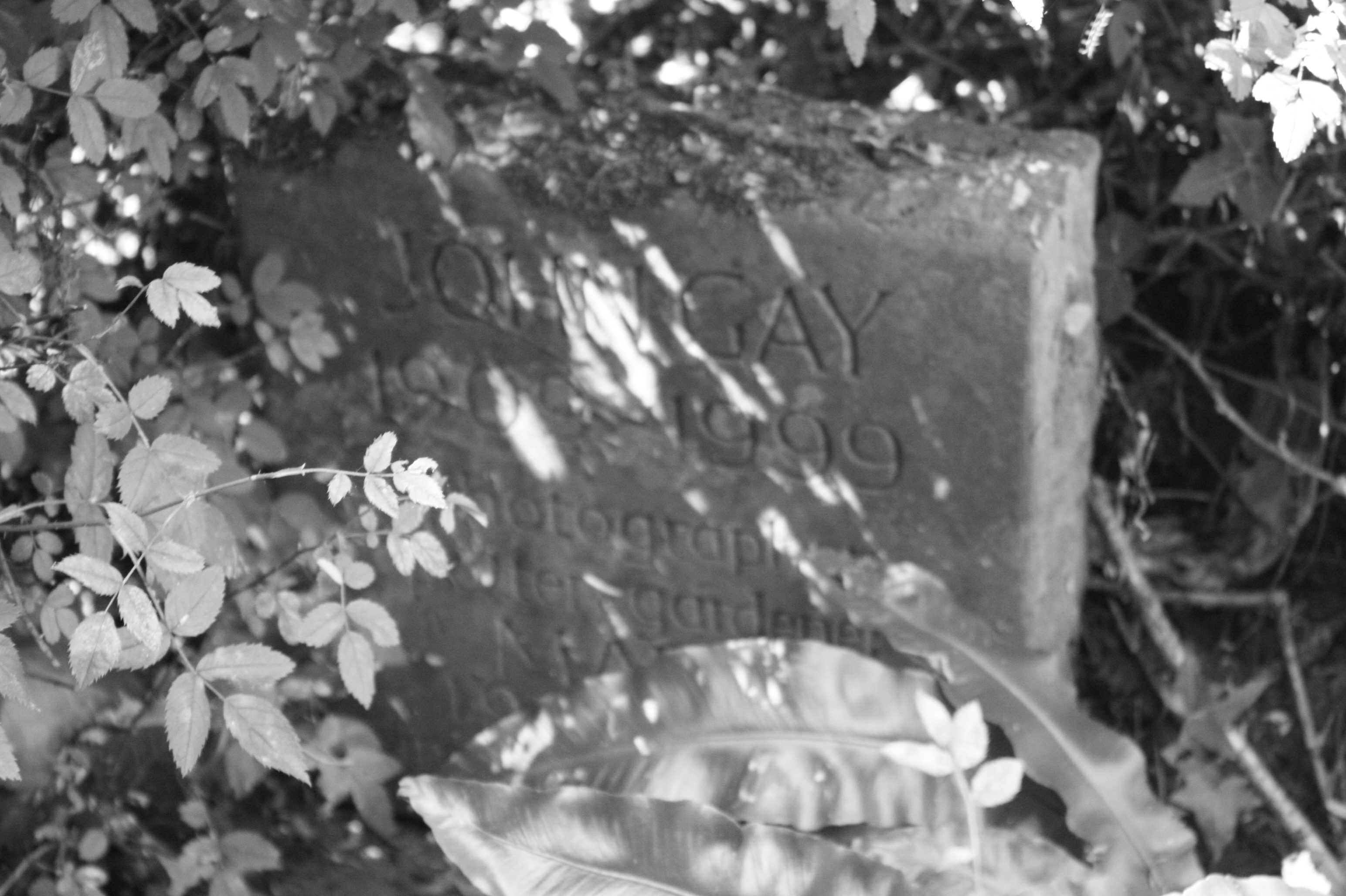
The gravestone of John Gay, Highgate Cemetery, London

John Gay (born Hans Ludwig Göhler: 2 September 1909 in Karlsruhe, Germany – died 24 January 1999 in Highgate, London) was a photographer.

== Early life ==
Hans was an artistic child whose creativity was encouraged by his mother, a painter of flowers and animals, and his paternal uncle, Hermann Göhler, an artist and a professor of art at Karsruhe Art College which Hans also attended. In 1935 he left Germany, to study in England (initially language and later painting). The opportunity to emigrate came from family friends, Mr and Mrs Sally Stern, the parents of his boyhood friend Walter Stern. The Sterns decided to leave Germany in 1933 following Hitler's appointment as Chancellor. Hans thought of himself as the Stern's adopted son so great was their influence, Walter's mother Martha was a photographer.

== Career ==
He settled in London, where he changed his name, and launched a photographic career, finding work as a self-employed commercial photographer, before serving with the Pioneer Corps from 1939 until the end of the Second World War.

After his marriage to Marie Arnheim in 1942, the couple settled in Highgate, London. He based his professional photographic practice here, which covered a varied range of subjects from animals for pet food companies, architecture and country scenes for Country Fair magazine, to the portraits of literary personalities including Terence Rattigan, Dylan Thomas and Vita Sackville-West for the Strand Magazine.

In the summer of 1949 Gay captured a series of photographs of Blackpool holidaymakers for Country Fair, many of which now typify the popular image of seaside holidays of the past.

Gay's love of architecture, nature and the countryside are reflected in his work. His photographs are published in six books. His second book, Prospect of Highgate & Hampstead (1967) put Gay on the map as an architectural photographer. In 1972 he published London’s Historic Railway Stations with Sir John Betjeman but his best known book is Highgate Cemetery, published in 1984, with Felix Barker. A subject close to his heart, Gay was actively involved in the rejuvenation of Highgate Cemetery following years of neglect after the Second World War.

After his death in 1999, over 40,000 of Gay's photographs were left to English Heritage and are held in its public archive, now the Historic England Archive. The National Portrait Gallery also holds a collection of his portraits of personalities.

There is what appears to be a headstone in the west of Highgate Cemetery suggesting that his ashes are buried there, however there is no record of their interment in the Cemetery's archives. The stone lies near a main path, opposite the grave of George Michael, but it is easily missed, being small and partly obscured by planting.

== Books published ==
=== John Gay: England Observed ===
- published in 2009 by English Heritage. 300 photographs from the large collection of his work held by English Heritage in its public archive.

ISBN 978-1-84802-003-0

Highgate Cemetery: Victorian Valhalla

=== Prospect of Highgate & Hampstead ===
- published in 1967 and attributed to Clark, Leonard and John Gay

=== London’s Historic Railway Stations ===
- published in 1972 and attributed to Sir John Betjeman (author) and John Gay (photographer) ISBN 978-1-85414-254-2

=== Highgate Cemetery: Victorian Valhalla ===
Gay spent a lot of time as a volunteer with the Friends of Highgate Cemetery. In 1984 they published this book incorporating a collection of his photographs, with a commentary by Francis Barker (ISBN 978-0719541377)
