= Ethel Booty =

English photographer of buildings

Ethel Mary Booty
- Born: Ethel Mary Lawson circa 1873; Clapham, London, England
- Died: 13 April 1964 (aged 90–91)
- Resting place: Littleham, East Devon, England
- Occupation: Photographer
- Years active: 1940s – early 1960s

Ethel Mary Booty (née Lawson; c. 1873 – 13 April 1964), was an English photographer of buildings, whose work forms a collection held by Historic England.

== Life ==
Ethel Mary Booty was born in Clapham, London. She was a photographer who contributed to the National Buildings Record between 1940 and the 1960s. Her photographs held in the Historic England Archive focus mainly on church architecture (especially Norman fonts), as well as castles, ruined priories and villages in the south of England. She also contributed photographs to the Conway Library archive, Courtauld Institute of Art, in London, which is currently undergoing a digitisation project. Her Conway photographs include general views of Bolton (Greater Manchester), views of Bishopsteignton, Devon, and miscellaneous ecclesiastical subjects.

She spent some time in India, and in Madras on 13 January 1897 married a magistrate, Percy Abbey Booty (1873 – 14 August 1939), who worked for the Indian Civil Service. They had a daughter, Doris Marjorie Booty (24 January 1898 – 15 January 1974). By 1911 they had returned to England, and lived in St Leonards-on-Sea, East Sussex. The three of them are buried under one headstone in the churchyard of St Margaret and St Andrew Church, Littleham, East Devon.

== Subjects of her photographs ==
The following are examples of some of the subjects that she photographed, held in the Historic England archive.

=== Buildings ===
- Bamburgh Castle, Bamburgh, Northumberland (1940s-early 1950s)
- Church of St John the Baptist, Burford, Oxfordshire (1940s-early 1960s)
- Huddington Court, Huddington, Wychavon, Worcestershire (1940s)
- Dunster Castle Mill, Mill Lane, Dunster, Dunster Park, West Somerset (1940s)
- Lanercost Priory, Burtholme, Lanercost, Carlisle, Cumbria (1940s-early 1960s)
- Tintern Abbey, Monmouthshire (1940s-early 1960s)
- Cleeve Abbey, Chapter House, Old Cleeve, West Somerset (1940s)
- Malt House, Upper Street, Hollingbourne, Maidstone, Kent (1940s)
- South Park Farm, Smarts Hill, Penshurst, Sevenoaks, Kent (1940s)
- Odda's Chapel, Deerhurst, Tewkesbury, Gloucestershire (1940s)
- Castle Acre Priory, Priory Road, Castle Acre, King's Lynn and West Norfolk (1940s)
- The Star Inn, High Street, Alfriston, Wealden, East Sussex (1940s)
- Fountains Abbey, Harrogate, North Yorkshire (1940s)
- Rievaulx Abbey, Ryedale, North Yorkshire (1940s)

=== Objects ===
- Font in the Church of St Mary Magdalene, Eardisley, Herefordshire (1940s)
- Font in the nave of the Church of St James, Swimbridge, Devon (1940s-early 1960s)
- Font in St Mary's Church, Luppitt, East Devon (1940s)
- Font in St Peter's Church, Southrop, Cotswolds, Gloucestershire (1940s)
- Font in All Saints' Church, East Meon, East Hampshire (1940s)
- Font in St Michael's Church, Castle Frome, Herefordshire (1940s)
- Font in St Mary's Church, Brancaster, Burnham Deepdale, King's Lynn And West Norfolk (1940s)
- Font in St Mary's Church, Stalham, North Norfolk (1940s)
- Font in St Mary's Church, Childrey, Vale of White Horse, Oxfordshire
- Font in Holy Trinity Church, Church Street, Lenton, Nottingham (1940s)
- Font in Church of the Holy Rood, Shilton, West Oxfordshire (1940s)
- Font in St Andrew's Church, Market Place, Castle Combe, Wiltshire (1940s)
- King John's Bridge, Tewkesbury, Gloucestershire (1940s)
- Butter Cross, High Street, Winchester, Hampshire (1940s)

=== Places ===
- Church Steps, Vicarage Road, Minehead, Somerset (1940s)
- Selworthy, West Somerset (1940s)
- Dunster, West Somerset (1940s-early 1950s)
