= Sydney Pitcher =

British photographer

Sydney Alfred Pitcher FRPS (9 March 1884 – 4 March 1950) was a photographer with a special interest in medieval ecclesiastical architecture, particularly stained glass windows. In his 1926 book on English Stained Glass, the art historian and critic, Sir Herbert Read, acknowledged that the illustration of the book would have been difficult “without the co-operation of Mr Sydney Pitcher of Gloucester” to whom “all students of stained glass and of medieval art in general, are under a great debt for the enthusiastic zeal with which he is recording the remains of church art in England”.

== Early life ==
Sydney Pitcher was born in Gloucester, the only surviving son of Arthur Hearsham Pitcher (1851-1912) and Sarah Alice Pitcher (née Marrett,1853–1933). His father was a professional photographer in the city and president of the Gloucester Photographic Society between 1911 and 1912. Pitcher learned his craft from his father and as early as 1900, when he was only 16, his photograph of the Crypt of Gloucester Cathedral was selected for the annual exhibition of the Royal Photographic Society.

== Career ==
Pitcher worked with his father at his photographic business in the shadow of Gloucester Cathedral until his father's death in 1912 when he inherited the family business and home. In the 1927 Kelly's Directory of the County of Gloucester, Sydney Pitcher is listed as a commercial photographer, publisher and picture frame maker, operating from 5 & 7 College Court, Gloucester.

Early on in his career, Pitcher showed a keen interest in medieval art and architecture. In 1910, he corresponded with Dugald Sutherland MacColl, the keeper of the Tate Gallery about the inclusion of his images of medieval misericords for an article. By 1915 Pitcher was working with John Le Couteur and the classicist Gordon McNeil Rushforth, both scholars of stained glass. Rushforth and Pitcher later collaborated to produce the 6 volume series The Stained Glass of Great Malvern Priory Church that Pitcher self-published between 1916 and 1935. Many of Pitcher's Malvern photographs are included in Rushforth's book published by Clarendon Press, Oxford in 1936: Medieval Christian Imagery as Illustrated by the Painted Windows of Great Malvern Priory Church Worcestershire.

In the introduction to the portfolio of photographs taken by Pitcher, Mediaeval Sculptures at Winchester College, published in 1935 by Oxford University Press with letterpress by Herbert Chitty, the circumstance of how the survey and book came about is detailed in its introduction on page 3 and reproduced below-;

In November 1917, the Warden and Fellows of Winchester College decided, at the suggestion of Sir Frederic Kenyon, that a photographic survey should be made of the sculptured ornaments of its ancient buildings. A year later Mr. Sydney Pitcher, F.P.S. of College Court, Gloucester, was invited to undertake this survey, and accepted the invitation. He started the work in 1922 and brought it to a close in 1929. The main scheme was to obtain a permanent record of the many perishable stone carvings with which the buildings had been adorned when originally erected...The portfolio reproduces a selection from Mr. Pitcher's photographs; it consists of forty-seven plates, comprising one hundred and twenty-three of the photographs taken by him. The whole collection is preserved amongst the College archives.

Pitcher not only took photographs, and self-published portfolios of those photographs, but also produced and wrote a survey of the stained glass in Gloucester's ecclesiastical buildings, Ancient Stained Glass in Gloucestershire Churches, that was published in the ‘Transactions of the Bristol and Gloucestershire Archaeological Society’ in 1925. Considered a pioneering survey, it was heralded as “a model to all future cataloguers and writers how these things should be done” in a review by the stained glass historian John Alder Knowles. Another reviewer remarked; “If a similar work were carried out for all the English counties we should be in possession of an archaeological “corpus” of permanent value and wide interest”. Pitcher visited every cathedral and church in the county between 1915 and 1925 and the survey lists 115 sites with medieval glass together with a further 23 which Pitcher's research revealed had glass before 1875 that had subsequently disappeared. It remains the most comprehensive survey of medieval glass in the county and this record, together with his other photographic works, continue to be points of reference for scholars today.

As well as his commercial work, Pitcher was also an experimental and technical photographer who took some early colour process negatives of Pauntley church in Gloucestershire thought to be connected with the three-plate Carbro process. He joined the Royal Photographic Society (RPS) in 1904, was admitted as an Associate member in 1925, and became a Fellow in 1928. In 1927, the RPS held an exhibition of seventy-two of his photographs of stained glass. The exhibition received praise in the Journal of the British Society of Master Glass-Painters as being ‘the first of its kind’ and in Country Life magazine, where it was described as a ‘triumph of photographic art’. During, and after, the Second World War, Pitcher photographed buildings and other artworks for the National Buildings Record. He was also on the Central Council of Diocesan Advisory Committee for the Care of Churches in Gloucester.

Sydney Pitcher died in Gloucestershire Royal Hospital on 4 March 1950 from cancer.

== Photographic legacy ==
Historic England Archive contains images by Pitcher, whose collection of over 5000 glass plates was commissioned by/donated to the Royal Commission on the Historical Monuments of England (formerly the National Buildings Record), and is of either secular or ecclesiastical architecture, especially cathedrals, in Gloucestershire, Hereford and Worcester, Oxfordshire, Hampshire and Berkshire. The University of Exeter has a small collection of over 400 black and white postcards and prints of ecclesiastical buildings in their archives, reportedly the stock from the business that was sold after Pitcher's death.

Gloucestershire Archives hold an album of photographs taken by Pitcher of the stained glass in the De Clare windows at Tewkesbury Abbey in 1925 which was presented to the sacristan, W.G. Bannister, upon his retirement. Not unsurprisingly, photographs by Pitcher are also included in the picture archive of the Corpus Vitrearum Medii Aevi (CVMA) of Great Britain; the CVMA being an international research project dedicated to recording medieval stained glass.

Photographs attributed to Pitcher are held in the Conway Library, whose archive, of primarily architectural images, is in the process of being digitised as part of the wider Courtauld Connects project. The collections of the British Museum and the Victoria and Albert Museum also contain photographs by Pitcher; the latter holding a complete set of the photographs of Gloucester churches included in his 1925 article Ancient Stained Glass in Gloucestershire Churches.
