= Milecastle 22 =

Milecastle on Hadrian's Wall in England

- Northumberland, England, UK
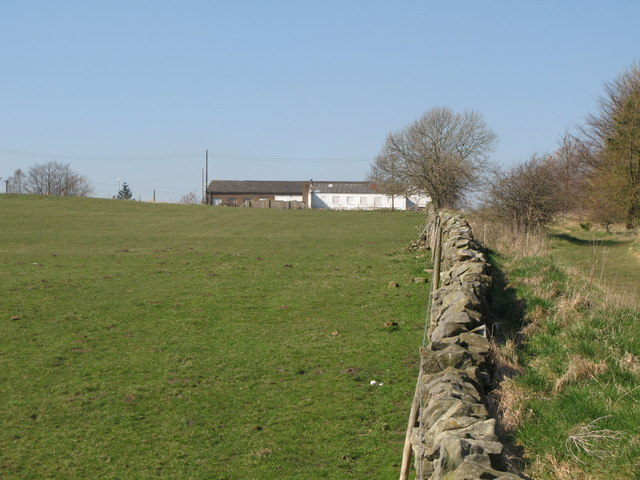
- The site of Milecastle 22

Location
- Location in Northumberland
- Coordinates: 55.012062°N 2.017702°W
- Grid reference: NY98966861

Milecastle 22 (Portgate) was a milecastle of the Roman Hadrian's Wall. Its remains exist as a low, turf covered platform just east of the Portgate roundabout (junction of the A68 and B6318). The platform is 0.5 metres (1.6 ft) on the east side, reducing to only a parch mark on the west side.

== Construction ==
Milecastle 22 was assumed to be a long-axis milecastle, and had Type III gateways (only the north gateway has been identified). Such milecastles were thought to have been constructed by the legio VI Victrix who were based in Eboracum (York).

The milecastle was 16.76 metres (55.0 ft) across, but due to the location, the length of the other axis cannot be determined. It was constructed with Narrow Walls with a Standard B offset.

Some time soon after construction of the milecastle, the north gateway was blocked by construction of a wall about 1 metre (3.3 ft) thick. It has been suggested that this is due to the proximity of the Portgate, rendering the milecastle redundant as a means of passage through the wall.

The curtain wall at this location was 3.05 metres (10.0 ft) wide.

== Excavations and investigations ==
- 1930 – Excavation showed that the side walls were 8 feet (2.4 m) thick, but the north Wall had the normal thickness (9 feet (2.7 m)). The internal width and the north gateway's type were also established. It was also discovered that the north gateway had been blocked.
- 1966 – English Heritage Field Investigation. The location was confirmed. It was also noted that the remains consisted of a slight earthen platform, considerably spread by cultivation.
- 1989 – English Heritage Field Investigation. It was noted that the milecastle survived as a squarish turf-covered platform, 0.5m high on the east side, but elsewhere as a parch mark only.
- 1992 – The eastern part of the south wall was unearthed, standing five courses high.

== Associated turrets ==
Each milecastle on Hadrian's Wall had two associated turret structures. These turrets were positioned approximately one-third and two-thirds of a Roman mile to the west of the Milecastle, and would probably have been manned by part of the milecastle's garrison. The turrets associated with Milecastle 22 are known as Turret 22A and Turret 22B.

Situated between Milecastle 22 and Turret 22A is a structure known as the Portgate. This was a major gateway, allowing Dere Street to pass through the line of the Hadrian's Wall.

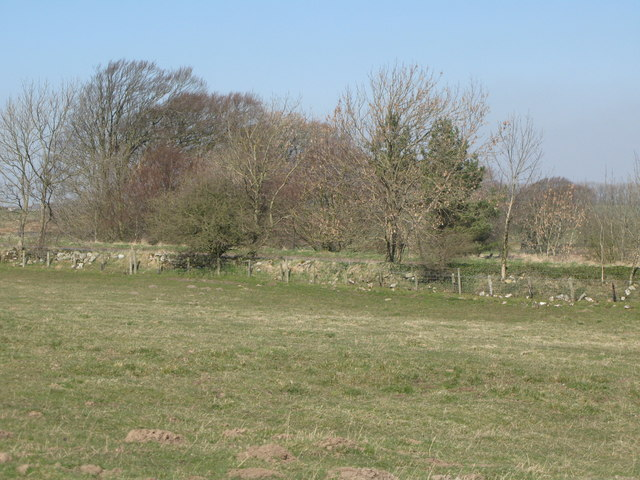
The site of Turret 22A

=== Turret 22A ===
Turret 22A (Portgate) is (all but the south wall) buried beneath the Military Road. The south wall is under a fence immediately to the south of the road and does not project into the field. Excavation in 1930 revealed that the masonry was four courses high on the west side and three on the east. The turret is of Standard A construction, indicating a change of builder since Milecastle 22.

In 1850, a stone was found in the vicinity inscribed with the words Latin: "Fulgar divom" ("the lightning of the gods"). It is thought that this was set up where lightning had struck.

Location on Ordnance Survey 1:25 000 map: 55.013139°N 2.025240°W

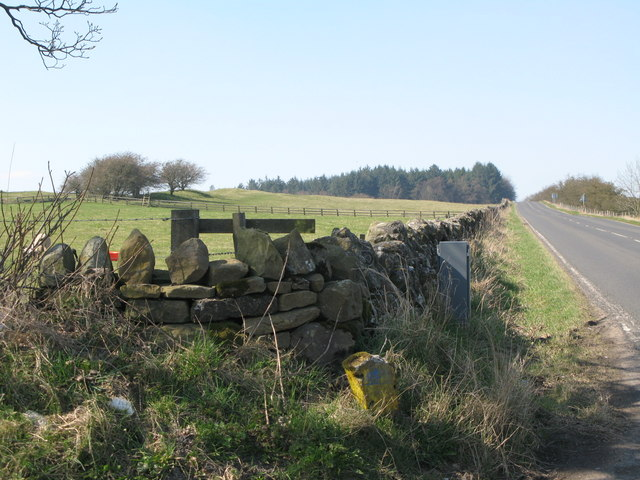
The site of Turret 22B

=== Turret 22B ===
Turret 22B (Stanley) was located in 1930, alongside the Military Road, 10 yards (9.1 m) to the west of the lane leading to Portgate Farm. There are no visible remains, the site being mainly covered by a modern road.

The vallum around the area of Turret 22B was particularly well preserved, causing William Hutton to write

I climbed over a stone wall to examine the wonder ... was fascinated, and unable to proceed; forgot I was on a wild common, a stranger, and the evening approaching ... lost in astonishment, I was not able to move at all.

Location on Ordnance Survey 1:25 000 map: 55.014081°N 2.033184°W

== Monument records ==
Monument	Monument Number	English Heritage Archive Number
Milecastle 22	18163	NY 96 NE 4
Turret 22A	18171	NY 96 NE 6
Turret 22B	18174	NY 96 NE 7

== Bibliography ==
- Daniels, Charles (1979), "Review: Fact and Theory on Hadrian's Wall", Britannia, 10: 357–364, JSTOR 526069
