= Milecastle 12 =

Mile Castle of Hadrian's Wall

- Northumberland, England, UK
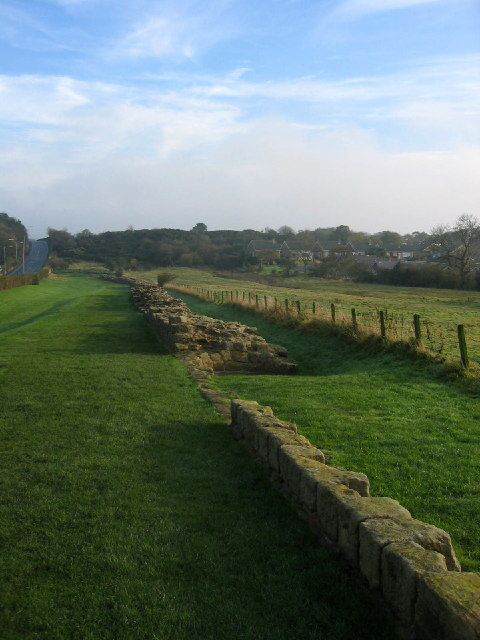
- The curtain wall in Heddon-on-the-Wall (east of Milecastle 12). The Vallum ditch can be seen running parallel in the field at right.

Location
- Location in Northumberland
- Coordinates: 54.996768°N 1.789811°W
- Grid reference: NZ135669

Milecastle 12 (Heddon) was a milecastle of the Roman Hadrian's Wall. Its remains lay under Town Farm, Heddon-on-the-Wall, (just opposite the farm house) with nothing visible on the surface.

== Construction ==
Milecastle 12 is of unknown axis and gateway types.

== Excavations and investigations ==
- circa 1746 - During construction of the Military Road, two inscriptions were discovered (presumed to be from the Heddon-on-the-Wall area). These attest rebuilding work by the Legio VI Victrix. One reads "LEG·VI·V·P·F·REF·TER·ET·SAC·COS", referring to Tertullus and Sacerdos (Consuls for 158AD).
- 1752 – A large hoard of coins in wooden boxes is found here.
- 1820 – A small hoard of coins is found near here. These comprise coins from Emperor Maximian (286 – 305 AD) to Emperor Arcadius (383 – 408 AD).
- 1926 – The north gate is recorded as having been found.
- 1928–29 – A further search is made, without success.
- 1966 – English Heritage Field Investigation. It was noted that there were no surface indications from which the site could be established, and the area was largely covered by modern farm buildings.
- 1989 – English Heritage Field Investigation. It was noted that there was no surface trace of the milecastle, though its exact position is unknown.

== Associated turrets ==
Each milecastle on Hadrian's Wall had two associated turret structures. These turrets were positioned approximately one-third and two-thirds of a Roman mile to the west of the Milecastle, and would probably have been manned by part of the milecastle's garrison. The turrets associated with Milecastle 12 are known as Turret 12A and Turret 12B.

=== Turret 12A ===
Turret 12A (Heddon West) is located beside (and mainly beneath) the B6318 Military Road a short distance West North West of Heddon-on-the-Wall. No surface traces are currently visible.

The turret was located in 1928 as 548 yards (501 m) west of Milecastle 12. This location was confirmed by a partial excavation in 1930. It was found that the walls were reduced to ground level beyond the edge of the roadway, but had the same plan as Turret 12B. However, the platform (which occupied the South side of the interior of Turrets 12B and 13A), was too badly robbed for any trace to remain. The mortared walls were recorded as 1.22 metres (4.0 ft) thick, with the doorway lying to the east.
Location on Ordnance Survey 1:25 000 map: 54.998174°N 1.797620°W

=== Turret 12B ===
Turret 12B (North Lodge) is located beside the Military Road (at a point where the B6318 is diverted away from it, but it still exists as a narrow metaled track). It was located in 1928, 543 yards from Turret 12a and 529 yards from Milecastle 13. It was excavated in 1930, and found to be almost identical in plan to Turret 12A. The platform was rectangular and occupied the south side of the interior.
Location on Ordnance Survey 1:25 000 map: 54.999264°N 1.805243°W

== Monument records ==
Monument	Monument Number	English Heritage Archive Number
Milecastle 12	22775	NZ 16 NW 3
Turret 12A	22778	NZ 16 NW 4
Turret 12B	22781	NZ 16 NW 5

== Bibliography ==
- Daniels, Charles (1979), "Review: Fact and Theory on Hadrian's Wall", Britannia, 10: 357–364, JSTOR 526069
