= Milecastle 18 =

- Northumberland, England, UK
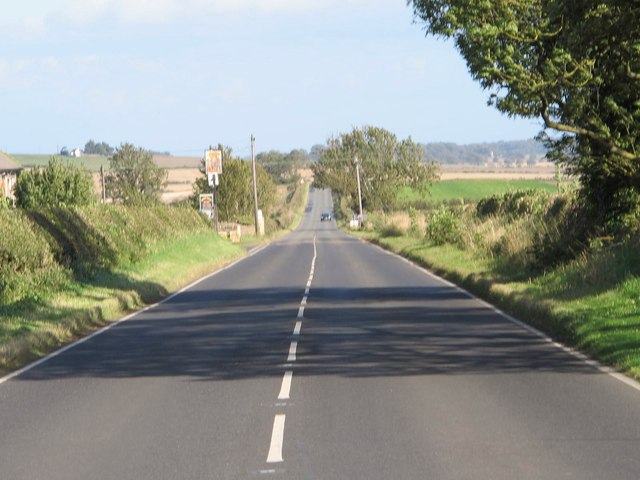
- The line of Hadrian's Wall (beneath the modern road) at Milecastle 18

Location
- Location in Northumberland
- Coordinates: 55.009777°N 1.926324°W
- Grid reference: NZ04816836

Milecastle 18 (East Wallhouses) was a milecastle of the Roman Hadrian's Wall. It is located to the west of the settlement of East Wallhouses in Northumberland and is visible as a platform in the ground. The milecastle is of a unique construction, having a gateway associated with builders of the Legio II Augusta and a layout typical of the Legio VI Victrix or Legio XX Valeria Victrix. Historians have suggested that it may have been begun by men of one legion and finished by those of another. One of Milecastle 18's associated turrets shows evidence of being used as a workshop, possibly for the repair of shoes.

== Construction ==
Milecastle 18 was a long-axis milecastle with Type I gateways. Long axis milecastles were usually built by the Legio VI Victrix or Legio XX Valeria Victrix, whilst those with type I gateways are thought to have been built by Legio II Augusta. Milecastle 18 is the only one of the series of 80 to have the combination of type I gateways and a long axis. The gateway of this milecastle is of a rougher construction than others with type I gateways. The milecastle has a broad north wall but narrow side walls suggesting that this example was begun by troops of one legion but completed by those of another.

The milecastle is situated on the Military Road just to the west of East Wallhouses. It measures 53 feet 8 inches (16.36 m) east to west and 59 feet 6 inches (18.14 m) north to south with side walls 7 feet 9 inches (2.36 m) thick. It was scheduled as an ancient monument on 14 July 1997. There are no structural remains though part of the milecastle is visible as a 0.5-metre-high (1.6 ft) platform next to the road, which covers much of the former milecastle.

== Excavations and investigations ==
- 1931 – Milecastle 18 is found to be largely robbed of stone when excavated, except the portion preserved beneath the modern road.
- 1978 – Excavations slightly to the west of the milecastle toward a farm reveal the presence of cobbles and sandstone that may be associated with a roadway approaching the south gate of the fort possibly as part of the Roman Military Way.
- 1999 – The ditch outside of this milecastle is excavated. It is found to be 13 m (43 ft) across and between 2.74 and 2.96 m (9 ft 0 in and 9 ft 9 in) deep with a U-shaped profile. There is no sign of a causeway across it, though one used to exist across the Vallum, south of the wall.

== Associated turrets ==
Each milecastle on Hadrian's Wall had two associated turret structures. These turrets were positioned approximately one-third and two-thirds of a Roman mile to the west of the Milecastle, and would probably have been manned by part of the milecastle's garrison. The turrets associated with Milecastle 18 are known as Turret 18A and Turret 18B.

=== Turret 18A ===
Turret 18A (Wallhouses East) is located at the junction of Moorhouse Road and the Military Road. Its position can be seen by a rise in the hedgeline. When excavated in 1931 it was found to be well preserved with the ladder platform still standing at full height and with six stone steps. A ballista ball was also discovered during the excavation. To the west of Turret 18A an excavation of the Vallum was undertaken in 1980–81 in advance of construction works for a pipeline. The Vallum was discovered to be 8m wide and 2.29m deep at this point. The mounds beside the Vallum had been breached during the Antonine period to allow a metalled causeway to be laid across. Plough marks were discovered beneath the mounds, indicating the presence of farming in this area prior to the Vallum's construction. Turret 18A became a scheduled monument at the same time as milecastle 18.

Location on Ordnance Survey 1:25 000 map: 55.010320°N 1.933828°W

=== Turret 18B ===
Turret 18B (Wallhouses West) lies beneath the grass verge of the Military Road. A toll house, now demolished, used to stand on much of the turret's remains. The turret was partially excavated in 1931 with a full excavation being undertaken by Durham University in 1959. The excavations revealed evidence of a platform on the turret's floor (made of clay) and a hearth in the doorway. This turret may have functioned as a workshop, as the hearth shows evidence of being used at high temperatures; a 1 m (3 ft 3 in) deep layer of iron oxide impregnated ash was present and many iron finds were made. A nearby small enclosure was apparently used as a coal store. Finds included an iron shield boss and 60 hobnails (suggesting the repair of shoes was carried out here) as well as a brooch, three copper items, a bone plaque, a struck flake, cooking pots, cut bones of cattle and pigs and shellfish remains. These finds demonstrate two distinct periods of occupation, separated by a layer of rubble. Durham University's excavation concluded that the turret had fallen out of use by the end of the 2nd century AD. There are no visible remains, and the turret was scheduled at the same time as the Milecastle and Turret 18A.

Location on Ordnance Survey 1:25 000 map: 55.010863°N 1.941646°W

== Monument records ==
| Monument | Monument Number | English Heritage Archive Number |
|---|---|---|
| Milecastle 18 | 20446 | NZ 06 NW 1 |
| Turret 18A | 20449 | NZ 06 NW 2 |
| Turret 18B | 20452 | NZ 06 NW 3 |
