= Milecastle 7 =

Milecastle of the Roman Hadrian's Wall in United Kingdom

- Tyne and Wear, England, UK
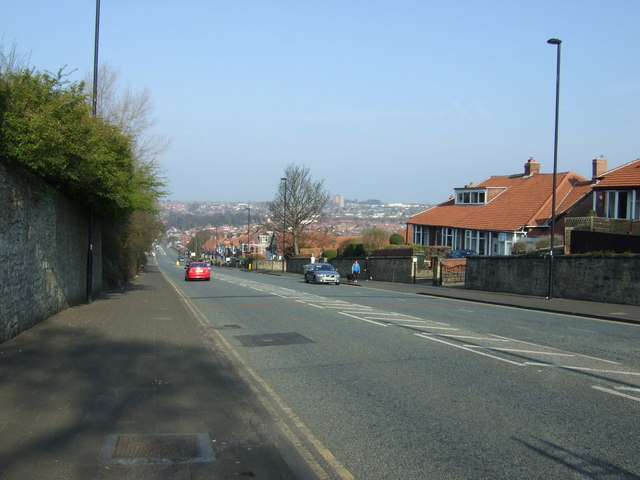
- Milecastle 7 probably lies near the A186 road

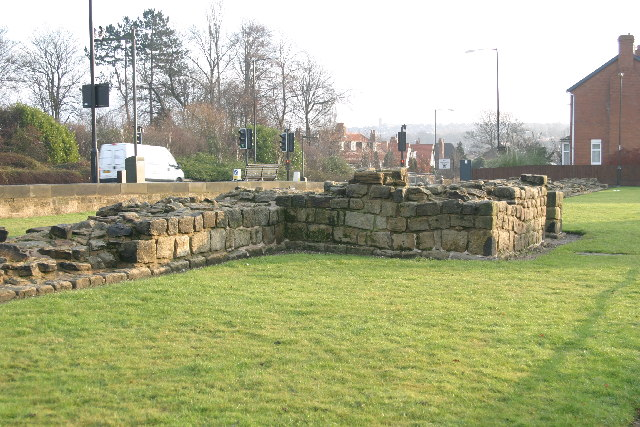
- Turret 7B and attached wall

Location
- Location in Tyne and Wear
- Coordinates: 54.980119°N 1.676469°W
- Grid reference: NZ20806510

Milecastle 7 (Benwell Bank or Benwell Hill) was a milecastle of the Roman Hadrian's Wall. The milecastle itself has not been discovered by archaeologists and its presumed location lies beneath a modern housing development. Roman finds have been made in the area and the associated structure of Turret 7B is a significant surviving structure of the wall.

== Construction ==
Milecastle 7 has not been located. English Heritage currently lists it at a presumed location midway between Turret 6B (which was located in 1751) and Turret 7A (which has visible remains). This location is covered by modern housing development.

== Excavations and investigations ==
A site investigation in 1928 failed to discover any trace of the milecastle. Three stones have been found in the area of Milecastle 7 bearing the markings of the Legio II Augusta. Their style dates them to the late 2nd century AD, suggesting that the wall here was repaired around that date.

== Associated turrets ==
Each milecastle on Hadrian's Wall had two associated turret structures. These turrets were positioned approximately one-third and two-thirds of a Roman mile to the west of the Milecastle, and would probably have been manned by part of the milecastle's garrison. The turrets associated with Milecastle 7 are known as Turret 7A and Turret 7B.

=== Turret 7A ===
Turret 7A is located in Denton Burn, in between Thorntree Drive and Brignall Gardens off the A186. During the construction of a nearby house in 1923 a sestertius coin dating to the reign of Emperor Trajan was discovered. Another coin was found in 1929.

Location: 54.981843°N 1.682549°W

=== Turret 7B ===
Turret 7B (Denton Hall Turret or Denton Turret) is located in West Denton opposite East Denton Hall (also known as Bishops House) on West Road. The turret is up to six courses high and is made from sandstone. It is recessed by 5 feet (1.5 m) into a section of the broad part of Hadrian's Wall that measures 65m long. Turret 7B is 13 feet (4.0 m) wide north to south and 14 feet (4.3 m) east to west with a 3 feet 8 inches (1.12 m) wide entrance in its south side. The wall associated with Turret 7B is the furthest east of the known surviving sections. Small sections of consolidated wall lie between Turret 7B and 7A at 54.98287°N 1.68616°W and 54.98271°N 1.68546°W.

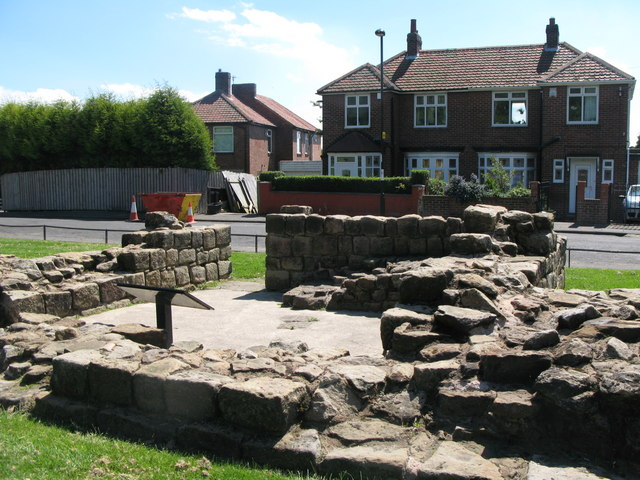
The interior of Turret 7B

The turret was first located in 1928 and excavated by the Office of Works in 1929. The excavation discovered a heap of pottery in the centre of the east wall, which has been suggested as the location of a window. Three different levels of floor were found suggesting three stages of occupation of 122–196, 205–295 and 300–367 AD. The original floor was constructed of clay and contained a hearth and a stone box, with a stone bowl on it, the floor had been partially repaired with flagstones. A spearhead and the binding from a shield were discovered within the repair. A building had been constructed over the turret and 18th-century pottery remains associated with this were also found. Another excavation was carried out in 1936. It has been proposed that Turret 7B was one of the structures garrisoned by soldiers based at the Condercum fort to the east in Benwell.

The turret was placed under English Heritage guardianship by 1971. The turret and attached wall are maintained as a single property by English Heritage (known as "Denton Hall Turret"). The organisation operates the property as an open access site with no entrance fees. Turret 7B was the first site on Hadrian's Wall visited in Guy de la Bédoyère's BBC Radio 4 series The Romans in Britain.

Location: 54.984139°N 1.691234°W

== Monument records ==
Monument	Monument Number	English Heritage Archive Number
Milecastle 7	24841	NZ 26 NW 1
Turret 7A	24842	NZ 26 NW 2
Turret 7B	22648	NZ 16 NE 1
