= Milecastle 13 =

Milecastle on Hadrian's Wall in England

- Northumberland, England, UK
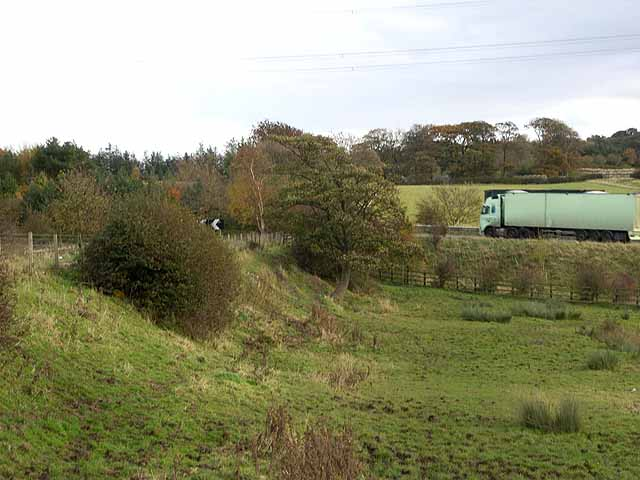
- Hadrian's Wall Path near the site of Milecastle 13

Location
- Location in Northumberland
- Coordinates: 55.000327°N 1.812460°W
- Grid reference: NZ120673

Milecastle 13 (Rudchester Burn) was a milecastle of the Roman Hadrian's Wall. Its remains exist as a low platform south of the B6318 Military Road.

== Construction ==
Milecastle 13 was a short-axis milecastle and the north gateway has been identified as Type I. Such milecastles were thought to have been constructed by the legio II Augusta who were based in Isca Augusta (Caerleon).

The milecastle measured 15.24 metres (50.0 ft) × 17.91 metres (58.8 ft) with narrow side walls having a thickness of 2.34 metres (7.7 ft).

The threshold of the north gate was unworn, and raised 23 centimetres (9.1 in). One stone remained, which could have acted as a third threshold, or part of a later narrowing of the gateway.

== Excavations and investigations ==
- 1776 – A hoard of 516 gold and silver coins (in a pot) was found. The latest dated to AD 168.
- 1930 – Excavation revealed the dimensions and gateway type.
- 1955 – English Heritage Field Investigation. It was noted that the milecastle was visible as a slight rise, but that the slopes not surveyable.
- 1966 – English Heritage Field Investigation. The description and published survey was confirmed.
- 1989 – English Heritage Field Investigation. It was noted that a platform survived, 0.2 metres (0.66 ft) to 0.4 metres (1.3 ft) high, with a further drop of around 4 metres (13 ft) to the east. The platform measured approximately 20 metres (66 ft) east-west and 13 metres (43 ft) north-south overall. 20 metres (66 ft) to the east was another slight mound, measuring 12 metres (39 ft) east-west and 7 metres (23 ft) north-south overall.

== Associated turrets ==
Each milecastle on Hadrian's Wall had two associated turret structures. These turrets were positioned approximately one-third and two-thirds of a Roman mile to the west of the Milecastle, and would probably have been manned by part of the milecastle's garrison. The turrets associated with Milecastle 13 are known as Turret 13A and Turret 13B.

=== Turret 13A ===
The remains of Turret 13A (Rudchester East) are covered by the B6318 Military Road. Investigation in 1930 revealed the turret to have the same plan as Turrets 12A and 12B, having a rectangular platform which occupied the south side of the interior. The mortared walls were recorded as 1.22 metres (4.0 ft) thick, with the doorway lying to the east. At the location of Turret 13B, the curtain wall was recorded as 2.82 metres (9.3 ft) thick (broad wall).

The fort of Vindobala (Rudchester) lies between Turrets 13A and 13B.

Location on Ordnance Survey 1:25 000 map: 55.001399°N 1.819958°W

=== Turret 13B ===
No remains exist of Turret 13B (Rudchester West). Its measured position is 73 metres (80 yd) beyond the fort's west wall, at the location of an old toll-cottage.

Measured location: 55.002596°N 1.827551°W

== Monument records ==
Monument	Monument Number	English Heritage Archive Number
Milecastle 13	22784	NZ 16 NW 6
Turret 13A	22789	NZ 16 NW 7
Turret 13B	22792	NZ 16 NW 8

== Bibliography ==
- Daniels, Charles (1979), "Review: Fact and Theory on Hadrian's Wall", Britannia, 10: 357–364, doi:10.2307/526069, JSTOR 526069
