= Milecastle 10 =

Milecastle on Hadrian's Wall in England

- Tyne and Wear, England, UK
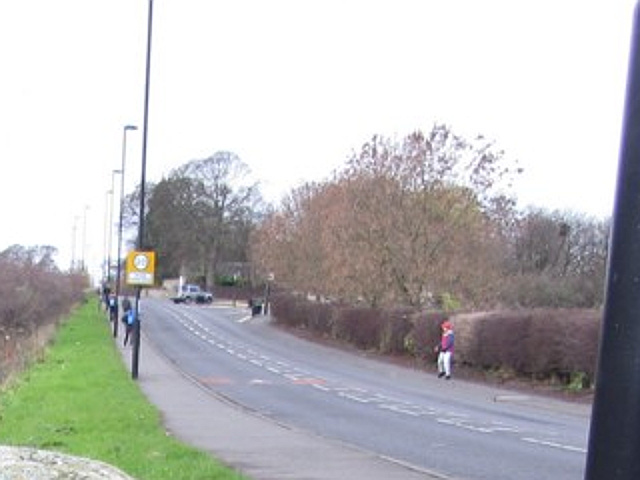
- Milecastle 10 lies near the B6528 road near Throckley

Location
- Location in Tyne and Wear
- Coordinates: 54.995197°N 1.744027°W
- Grid reference: NZ16476676

Milecastle 10 (Walbottle Dene) was a milecastle of the Roman Hadrian's Wall. It is located near to the modern village of Throckley in Tyne and Wear, northern England. Much of the milecastle lies beneath a road but partial remains of the north wall can be seen in the garden of Dene House. It has been excavated several times and its walls located, though the remains have been "considerably damaged by ploughing". Only one of the two associated turrets has been located and excavated.

== Construction ==
Milecastle 10 was a long-axis milecastle with Type IV gateways. Such milecastles were thought to have been constructed by the legio XX Valeria Victrix who were based in Deva Victrix (Chester). The usually straight Hadrian's Wall changes direction in this area, making a 20 degree turn just before it crosses a Dene (valley) and heading towards the Great Hill at Heddon-on-the-Wall.

The milecastle measures 78 feet 2 inches (23.83 m) long north to south and 67 feet (20 m) east to west with walls approximately 10 feet (3.0 m) wide. The north gateway survives in the front garden of Dene House and consists of twelve foundation slabs with three stone blocks lying on top. One of the blocks is marked with an asterisk, two of them contain pivot holes for a gate and one shows signs of a lewis-hole. The southern part of the milecastle is visible only as a 0.4m high mound in a field and part of the ditch is also visible.

== Excavations and investigations ==
- 1864 – The north and south gateways were excavated, the centre of the milecastle lying beneath a road. The north gateway was found to stand two courses high and contained an entrance 11 feet (3.4 m) wide. A centurial stone was discovered that was inscribed with "c[entvria] Car...", this stone is now in the collection of the Black Gate Museum.
- 1928 – The milecastle was excavated by the North of England Excavation Committee. They uncovered part of the south west gateway which lay in a field to the south of the road. The excavation discovered that little remained of the east wall and found no evidence of any internal structures.
- 1966 – An English Heritage field investigation found that only the northern gateway remained visible on the surface.
- 1979 – Another English Heritage field investigation was carried out and recorded the foundations of part of the north wall. The foundations were 6.4m long with three blocks of the first stone course still lying on top of them.
- 1988 – The Royal Commission on the Historical Monuments of England surveyed and measured the milecastle.
- 1999 – The milecastle was excavated by P Duffy of Central Archaeological Services as part of an interim evaluation carried out by English Heritage's Centre for Archaeology. Two trenches were put in to assess the state of the milecastle. The east and west walls were uncovered as well as some flagstone surfacing on the west side and an oven in the south-east corner. The remains were found to have been "considerably damaged by ploughing".
- 2000 – An archaeological investigation was carried out on the vallum near to Milecastle 10 by English Heritage in September.

== Associated turrets ==
Each milecastle on Hadrian's Wall had two associated turret structures. These turrets were positioned approximately one-third and two-thirds of a Roman mile to the west of the Milecastle, and would probably have been manned by part of the milecastle's garrison. The turrets associated with Milecastle 10 are known as Turret 10A and Turret 10B.

=== Turret 10A ===
Turret 10A (Throckley East) is located 509 yards (465 m) west of Milecastle 10. The turret lies beneath the modern Hexham Road (B6528) and there are no visible surface remains but has been excavated in 1930 and 1980. The 1930 excavation could only examine the south-east corner of the turret. It discovered that the walls were approximately 3 feet (0.91 m) thick and stood five courses of stone high. The entrance to the turret was in the south wall. The 1980 excavation, carried out before some nearby construction work, was more extensive and discovered just two distinct occupation layers within the turret.

Most of the pottery discovered in the turret has been dated to before 140 AD with just one sherd dating later than that. This places the turret's occupation to within the early period of the wall's life with little later activity, though there is no evidence that the turret was demolished after it ceased to be occupied. The excavation discovered that the walls consisted of a core of sandstone and clay surrounded by pointed mortar, with foundations of stone slabs set on clay. Extensive areas of burning and charcoal were discovered within the turret which could represent a series of hearths in the door threshold and along the north wall. Other finds on the site have included a spearhead and four worked flints and a possible platform in the south west corner.

The 1980 excavation removed the floor of the turret to examine the underlying clay layer. Here they discovered a series of criss-crossed grooves in the clay that were vertical on one side and sloping on the other. These were identified as ard (plough) marks that were likely to date to the late Neolithic or early Bronze Age periods and are certainly pre-Hadrianic. The excavation was later backfilled and the ard marks and turret sealed beneath the modern road.

Location: 54.995841°N 1.751213°W

=== Turret 10B ===
Turret 10B (Throckley) has not yet been located and there are no visible surface remains. Its likely position is under Hexham Road but excavations carried out in 1928 and 1983 failed to locate the turret. The soil in the area contains burnt wood remains possibly associated with ground clearance for the construction of the wall in this area.

Location: 54.996036°N 1.758871°W

== Monument records ==
Monument	Monument Number	English Heritage Archive Number
Milecastle 10	22673	NZ 16 NE 8
Turret 10A	22678	NZ 16 NE 9
Turret 10B	22681	NZ 16 NE 10
