= SmartFrame =

Image-obscuring software for websites

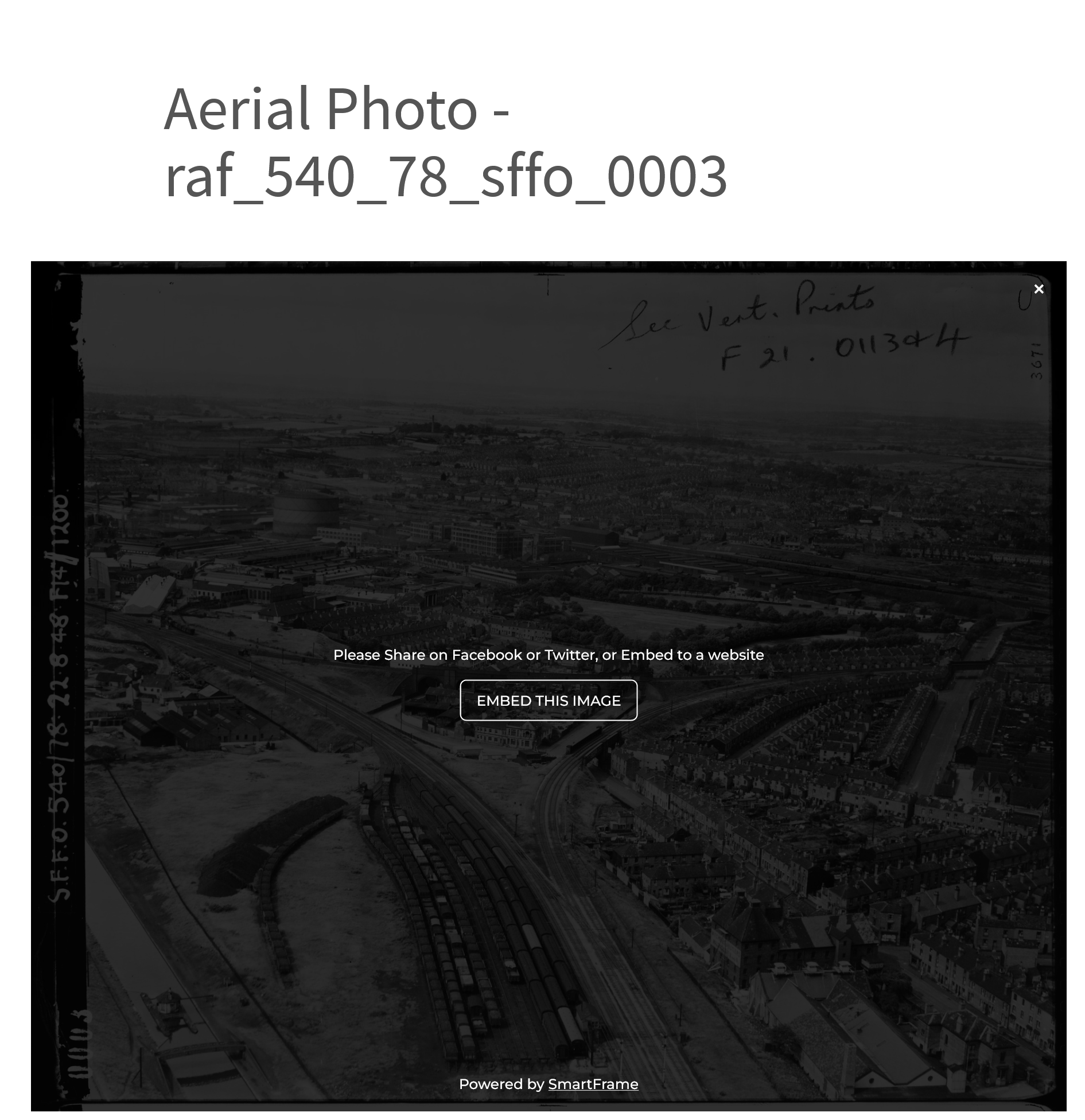
- The interstitial shown when a Windows user right-clicks on an image served by SmartFrame, on an Historic England website
- Original author: SmartFrame Technologies
- Type: Online image delivery
- Website: smartframe.io

SmartFrame was an online image delivery service and form of digital restrictions management that attempted to prevent viewers from downloading or copying the images it served, and to discourage them from taking screenshots of such images. It was sold by SmartFrame Technologies, founded in 2015, who described its methodology as "image streaming". The DRM can be bypassed by end users.

== Clients ==
Organisations using SmartFrame include:

- Historic England
- Tate
- Coventry University
