= Military Way (Hadrian's Wall) =

Roman road south of Hadrian's Wall

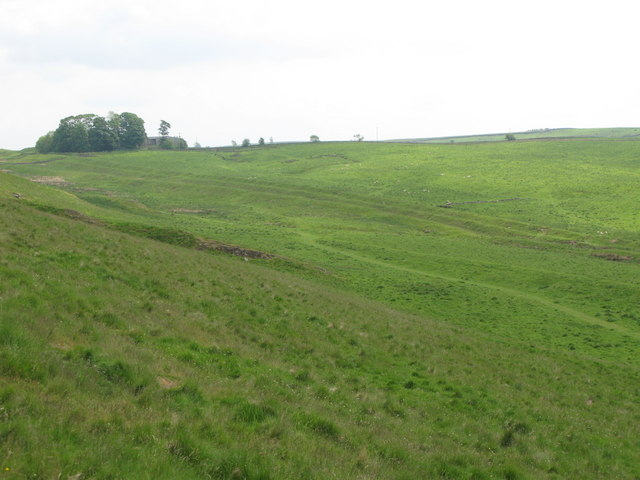
The course of the Military Way, seen here near Milecastle 42, ran between the southside of Hadrian's Wall and the Vallum.

The Military Way is the modern name given to a Roman road constructed immediately to the south of Hadrian's Wall.

== Establishment ==
Evidence has shown that the road was constructed before the abandonment of the turrets in the second century (linking roads between the Military Way and some turrets have been identified). The existence of the Stanegate suggests that it was not included in the original plan, and therefore it is likely to have been constructed soon after the reoccupation of Hadrian's Wall following the abandonment of the Antonine Wall in 162 AD.

== Characteristics ==
As with most Roman roads, the Military Way was constructed from large stones, and surfaced with gravel. It was usually around 6 metres (20 ft) wide with a camber of up to 46 centimetres (18 in). John Collingwood Bruce suggested that it was not intended for use by wheeled vehicles, and this is backed up by a survey of wall miles 40/41, where severe gradients up to 25% (33% in short stretches) were recorded.

Spurs have been identified linking the Military Way to some milecastles, for example Milecastle 9.

Some milestones have been found along the road (taking columnar form). These indicate that, in the third century, distances were numbered westwards from Dere Street.

== Course ==
The Military Way runs along the top of the north mound of the Vallum in many places, and elsewhere runs between the Vallum and the curtain wall. At the river crossings at Chesters Bridge and at Willowford Bridge near Birdoswald Roman fort, the bridges were widened in the early third century to take the road, as opposed to just the walkway as was previously the case.

== Present day ==
The course of the Military Way is still very much evident and walkable between Sewing Shields (near Milecastle 35) and Walltown Quarry (near Turret 45A). A public right of way follows the Military Way from Milking Gap (near Milecastle 38) to Walltown Quarry.
