= Gaius Julius Marcus =

Gaius Iulius Marcus is the name of one of the early governors of Britannia Inferior, c. 213 -214.

His name is recorded on a milestone on the Military Way at Hadrian's Wall although it has been partially erased, suggesting that he had brought disfavour on himself sometime later. He also undertook building work at the forts of Old Carlisle and Netherby.

Iulius Marcus' troops sided with Caracalla in the dispute over the throne that followed the death of Septimius Severus and erected their own dedications to their chosen candidate. The damnatio memoriae that their governor suffered may have been connected with this.
