= West Denton =

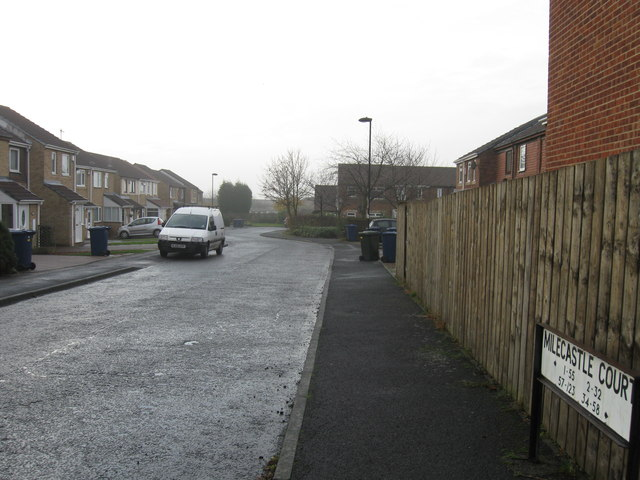
- Milecastle Court

- Location in Tyne and Wear
- Coordinates: 54.992°N 1.706°W
- OS grid reference: NZ189664
- Sovereign state: United Kingdom
- Country: England
- City and metropolitan borough: Newcastle upon Tyne

West Denton is an area in the western part of the city of Newcastle upon Tyne, Tyne and Wear, England.

== Education ==
Some of the schools in the area include:

Primary:

- Beech Hill Primary School
- West Denton Primary School
- St John Vianney RC Primary School

Specialist:

- Thomas Bewick

=== Secondary ===
- Studio West
- Mary Astell Academy

== History ==
West Denton was formerly a township in the parish of Newburn, in 1866 West Denton became a separate civil parish, on 1 April 1935 the parish was abolished and merged with Newburn. In 1931 the parish had a population of 861. In 1974 it became part of the metropolitan district of Newcastle upon Tyne.
