= Historic England Archive =

Public archive in Swindon, England

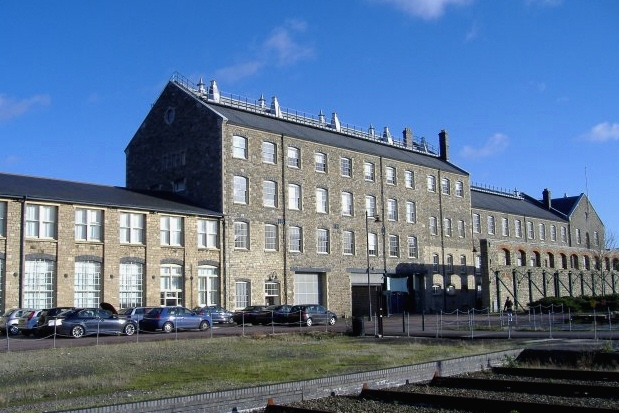
- The Historic England Archive's building
- Location: Fire Fly Avenue, Swindon, Wiltshire, England
- Type: Public
- Established: 2012
- Affiliation: Historic England

Building information
- Building: The Engine House
- Construction date: 1840s
- Heritage status: Listed
- Website: historicengland.org.uk/images-books/archive

The Historic England Archive is the public archive of Historic England, located in The Engine House on Fire Fly Avenue in Swindon, formerly part of the Swindon Works of the Great Western Railway.

It is a public archive of architectural and archaeological records and holds over 12 million historic photographs, plans, drawings, reports, records and publications covering England's archaeology, architecture, social and local history. It is a dynamic collection, with records being added to this day. The PastScape website allows searching of over 420,000 records (as of 2016).

== History ==
The roots of the archive go back to 1908 and the foundation of the Royal Commission on the Historical Monuments of England (RCHME) which was set up to compile and publish an inventory of all ancient and historical monuments up to the year 1700 by county and by parish.

Its more immediate forerunner, however, was the National Buildings Record (NBR), an independent body set up in 1940 under the inspiration of Walter Godfrey, its first director, "to meet the dangers of war then threatening many buildings of national importance". Between the declaration of war in 1939 and the first London air-raids in 1940 many moveable works of art, archives and antiquities were evacuated to the relative safety of the countryside. For example, the contents of the National Gallery were taken to country houses, slate mines and quarries in Wales. However, buildings could not be protected in this way, so steps were taken to collect architectural plans, drawings, photographs and other records. The RCHME worked closely with the NBR to carry out the extensive photographic recording of the towns in the eastern and southern counties at risk from enemy action.

Although there were other voluntary and academic bodies at the time that collected some architectural records (including the RCHME, the Royal Institute of British Architects and the London Survey Committee), they were apparently deemed to be too small or narrowly focused for the sort of comprehensive venture that seemed necessary in the chaos of wartime Britain.

The initial core of the collection was formed by the Conway Library of architectural photographs held by the Courtauld Institute of Art; the negatives of the Victorian photographer Henry Taunt of Oxford; items from the University of London and by quickly setting photographers to work recording buildings in London and other vulnerable areas. Over the next few years the NBR attracted donations from amateur photographers, people who possessed drawings and owners of collections of negatives.

By the end of the war the collection had grown to such size and importance that it was continued and was funded by the Treasury. The 1944 and 1947 Town and Country Planning Acts were important for the NBR as they meant that lists of buildings of architectural and historic importance were started, and the NBR had to be informed before an historic building was demolished.

The recession of the late 1940s and early 1950s presented a different challenge from bombing, but no less severe. This time the destruction of significant buildings was due to deliberate demolition because the owners (through new inheritance taxation and shortage of building materials) could no longer afford to maintain them. In 1946 the RCHME work was extended to include the recording of 18th and 19th century architecture.

In the 1950s the NBR archive acquisitions included the collections of Sydney Pitcher (medieval architecture and vernacular buildings); Helmut Gernsheim (photographs of tombs in St Paul's Cathedral and Westminster Abbey) as well as continued recording of architectural details such as glass, fixtures and fittings, woodwork and sculpture. The 1950s also saw the start of aerial photography to discover and record ancient sites, as more intensive agriculture, forestry and gravel extraction threatened historic remains on "marginal land".

The NBR was merged with the Royal Commission on the Historical Monuments of England (RCHME) in 1963. The name was then changed to the National Monuments Record (NMR) to denote the inclusion of archaeological and photographic records. During the 1960s, the importance of photographic records grew, and the archive acquired the surviving negatives of architectural photographer Harry Bedford Lemere (1864–1944) of houses, public buildings and interior decoration. (The National Maritime Museum holds another large section of his work.) The demolition of the Euston Arch and City of London Coal Exchange demonstrated the lack of regard there was at the time for (then) unfashionable Victorian architecture and the importance of keeping records of their existence.

During the 1970s and 1980s the NMR increased its recording of industrial and commercial building records as well as country houses. The expanding breadth of the archive is shown by the acquisition of Rev Denys Rokeby's collection of railway photographs, and H. E. S. Simmons's negatives of water and wind-mills, and John Maltby's collection of photographs of Odeon cinemas.

In 1983 the Ordnance Survey Archaeology Division was transferred to the NBR/RCHME which greatly expanded the records available. These are now digitised and available through the PastScape website. In 1984 the NMR took over the responsibility for the National Library of Aerial Photographs from the Department of the Environment, together with two million RAF and Ordnance Survey oblique and vertical aerial photographs.

A further acquisition was the Industrial Monuments Survey, transferred from the Department of the Environment (DoE) in 1981. This was followed by the RCHME taking on responsibility for the Survey of London following the abolition of the Greater London Council.

In 1992 the commission's terms of reference was extended to include responsibility for creating a central national record of historic wrecks and other archaeological sites within the 12-mile coastal limit.

The RCHME, including the NMR, merged with English Heritage in April 1999. In April 2012 the NMR was renamed the English Heritage Archive. In 2015 English Heritage was divided into two parts: those departments carrying out statutory and advisory functions became Historic England, and the archive, as part of the new body, was renamed the Historic England Archive.

In the late 2010s, the archive was reorganised, and the PastScape website is due to be decommissioned on 17 December 2020. Records that were previously available through PastScape will appear as Historic England research records on the Heritage Gateway.

== Contents ==
Its collections arose from a number of sources, including the work of national institutions concerned with the buildings and archaeology of England, and from collections acquired from others. The collections are not only used by historians, architects and designers seeking inspiration but also by family history researchers looking for photographs of where their ancestors lived and worked.

The scope and content of the material is wide-ranging – modern and historic photography, including coverage of the whole of England in aerial photographs; information on most known archaeological sites and listed buildings; complete sets of Country Life magazine; Victoria County Histories; the Council of British Archaeology's Industrial Archaeology index; Professor Goodhart-Rendel's personal index of late 19th century churches; the typescript report, photographs and drawings of Lt Col G W Meates's Lullingstone Roman villa excavation; and much more. There is also a specialist reference library. Although photographs form the largest proportion of the Historic England Archive's holdings, collections also include plans of historic houses, reports, correspondence and digital files. All of this material is available for public viewing and a substantial number of images from the Historic England Archive are now available online and free to access.

=== Buildings, drawings and surveys ===
The Historic England Archive holds information on over 70,000 individual buildings, as photographs, drawings, notes, reports from the Royal Commission on Historical Monuments for England (RCHME) and from English Heritage fieldwork. In addition, it holds over 56,000 architectural drawings, including plans, elevations, sketches and watercolours from the RCHME and other sources as well as many plans of English Heritage's properties. The original research material (notes, sketches and photographs) for RCHME inventory volumes are also in the archives.

There is a selection of brochures advertising the sales of estate and properties across England from the late 19th and 20th centuries.

=== Historic photographs ===
The Historic England Archive contains photographic collections dating from the 1850s. These include country house albums by anonymous amateurs; famous photographers such as Roger Fenton and Bill Brandt; architectural photographers such as Bedford Lemere & Co; commercial photographers like Miller and Harris, John Gay, Helmut Gernsheim and Eric de Mare; and the Thames Valley views of Henry Taunt. The earliest image in the archive taken by a woman (1864) is held amongst those by the many males, and joined in the collection by works of Alice Marcon, Margaret Harker, Eileen 'Dusty' Deste, Margaret Tomlinson, Ethel Booty, Ursula Clark, Marjory L Wight, Katherine J Macfee, Mary Theodora Pollit, and Patricia Payne.

There are also more esoteric collections acquired from, or donated by, individuals who were particularly interested in specialist topics such as medieval stained glass, public parks or windmills.

==== Aerial photographs ====
The Historic England Archive holds the largest public archive of aerial photographs in England, organised as two distinct collections – oblique and vertical – each acquired from different sources. More than 680,000 oblique (taken at an angle to the ground) aerial photographs of locations throughout England are available on open access in the Historic England Archive search rooms. The archive also holds more than two million vertical (bird's-eye view) aerial photographs, covering the whole of England, including near-complete coverage taken by the RAF in 1946–48, whose Crown copyright expired 50 years after the images were created. These are available via a search request from the Archive Services Team and many are online, via an "Aerial Photography EXplorer" launched in March 2022, which uses SmartFrame technology, which prevents users from saving images to a local drive, instead presenting an interstitial with the legend "This image is copyrighted". The 'Britain from Above' project, funded by the Heritage Lottery Fund, completed digitisation and cataloguing of 95,000 of the Aerofilms aerial image negatives from 1919 to 1953 and put them online.

==== Survey photographs ====
The photographs taken by the RCHME and English Heritage survey teams, which range from workers' cottages to power stations, are also available.

== Access ==
=== Online resources ===
Approximately 20% of the archive, i.e. over 2 million records, can be searched online.

The main online resources are:

- Historic England Archives – over a million free online catalogue descriptions of photographs and records of England's buildings and heritage sites. No longer updated.
- England's Places – Discover photos of English cities, towns and villages using this online version of the Architectural Red Box Collection from the Historic England Archive.
- Britain from Above – a unique archive of historical aerial photographs across Britain, from the Aerofilms collection (1919–2006)
- Images of England – over 300,000 contemporary photographs of England's listed buildings and monuments; based on the statutory list as it was in 2001, no longer updated
- PastScape – over 400,000 records on England's archaeological sites (including maritime sites) and architecture. With links to historic and modern maps and aerial photographs where available.
- The National Heritage List for England – database of all 400,000 nationally designated heritage assets i.e. listed buildings; scheduled monuments; protected wreck sites; registered battlefields and registered parks and gardens.
- Heritage Gateway – a partnership with the Association of Local Government Archaeology Officers (ALGAO) and the Institute of Historic Building Conservation (IHBC) to share local records on listed buildings

=== Personal visitors ===
For access to the wider archive, not just the material available online, it is possible to call, write or visit the Historic England Archive in Swindon, Wiltshire. Although an appointment is not necessary, it is recommended to contact them in advance.

In addition to accessing the collections, visitors to the Historic England Archive can also make use of the reference library. This includes the entire collection of Country Life and Architects' Journal magazines going back to the 19th century, both of which feature plans and photographs of thousands of homes, country estates, commercial and civic buildings.

== Archive services ==
The Historic England Archive offers a remote enquiry service providing a comprehensive search for information on areas of interest. Search requests are handled free of charge provided they fall within standard search criteria (for example, a single building per enquiry).

== See also ==
- National Monuments Record of Scotland
- National Monuments Record of Wales
- National Register of Historic Parks and Gardens
- Heritage asset
