= Coggabata =

Roman fort in Cumbria, England

- Drumburgh; Congavata, Concavata
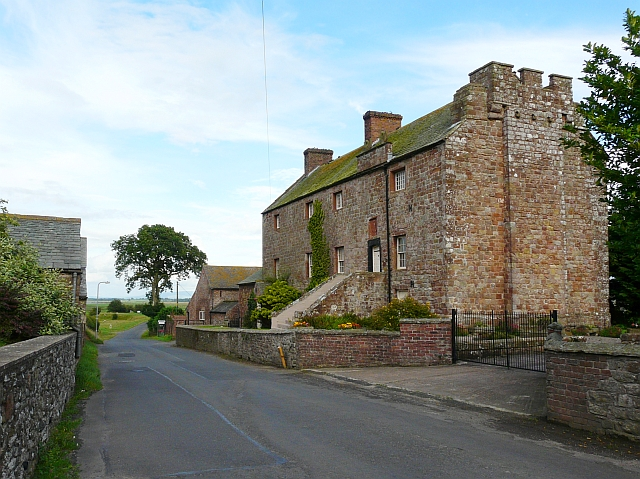
- Site of Concavata at Drumburgh. The fortified farmhouse or pele tower of Drumburgh Castle seen here was built with Roman wall stones.

- Location within Cumbria
- 54.927°N 3.148°W
- Location: Cumbria, England

Coggabata, or Congavata / Concavata, (with the modern name of Drumburgh) was a Roman fort on Hadrian's Wall, between Aballava (Burgh by Sands) to the east and Mais (Bowness-on-Solway) to the west. It was built on a hill commanding views over the flatter land to the east and west and to the shore of the Solway Firth to the north. Its purpose was to guard the southern end of two important Solway fords, the Stonewath and the Sandwath.

The Notitia Dignitatum gives the name of the fort as 'Congavata', but the Staffordshire Moorlands Pan gives the name as 'Coggabata'.

== Description ==
The fort was an oblong and built of stone, with the Wall running along its northern side, and measured 270 feet (82 m) north to south by 316 feet (96 m) east to west, occupying an area of just less than 2 acres (8,100 m^{2}). The Wall at this point is nine feet seven inches wide, and is made of stone. It was constructed on the foundations of the levelled Turf Wall. There were gates on each side, with the north gate giving access beyond the wall.

A Roman road has been proved by LIDAR photography to have linked Coggabata with the nearby Roman fort at Kirkbride to the south-west.

There is a pele tower, Drumburgh Castle (shown above right), lying across the line of the north wall of the fort, built entirely of Roman stones.

== Garrison ==
The Notitia Dignitatum gives the garrison as the Second Cohort of Lingones but only a detachment could be accommodated in such a small fort.

== Excavations ==
The site was excavated in 1899, when the stone fort was revealed. A buttressed granary was found within the north-west angle of the fort.

Excavations in 1947 revealed that the stone fort had been built within a slightly larger fort whose clay ramparts had been levelled. It is presumed that the earthwork fort had been added to the initial Turf Wall version of Hadrian's Wall in Cumbria, and that the stone fort replaced it when the Turf Wall was re-built in stone. This would date the stone fort to about 160 AD.

No sign of a vicus has yet been detected near to the fort.
