= Milecastle 78 =

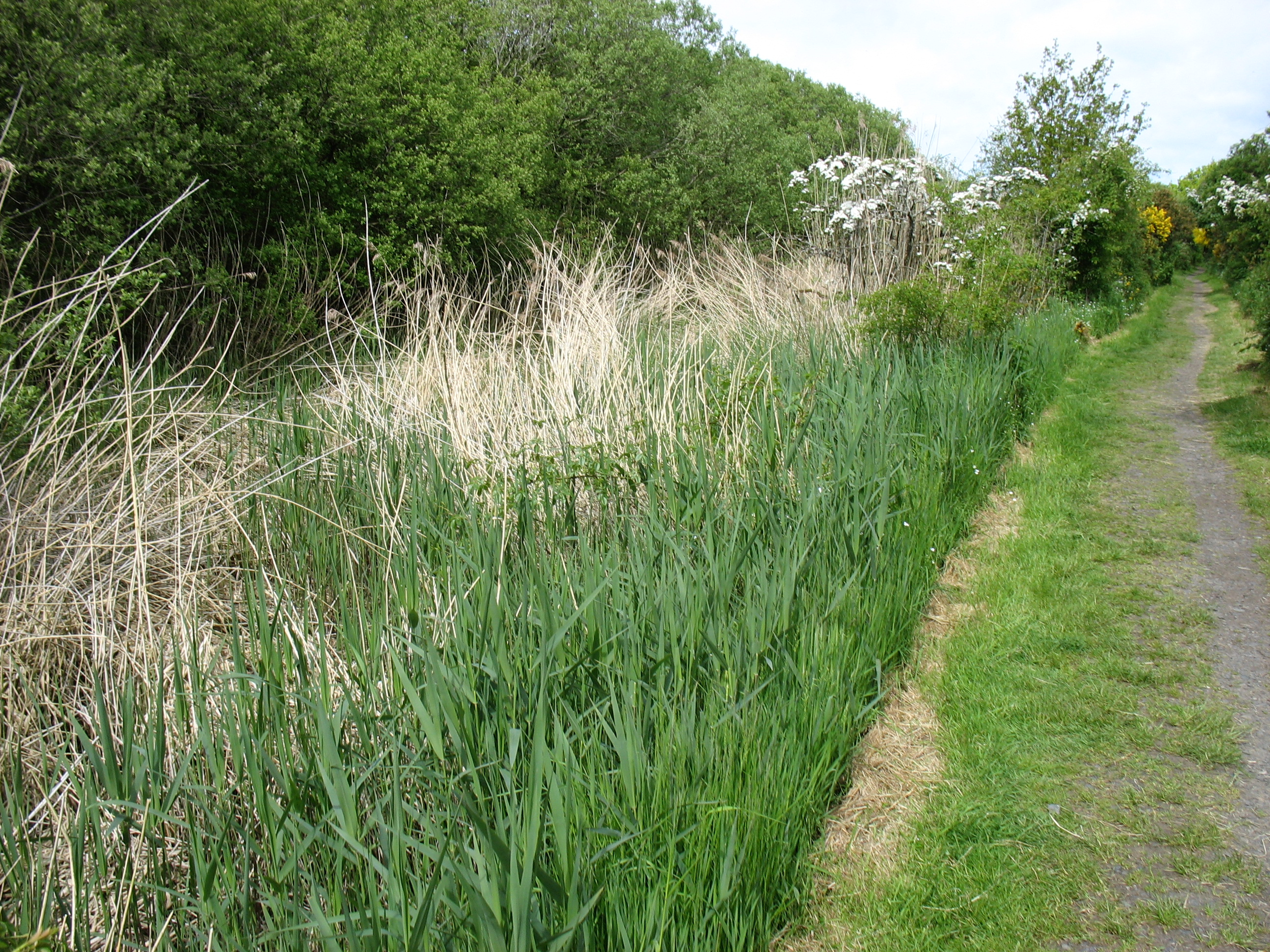
- Hadrian's Wall Path near the site of Milecastle 78

- Location within Cumbria
- 54.941084°N 3.179285°W
- Type: Milecastle
- Location: Cumbria, England

Milecastle 78 (Kirkland) was one of a series of Milecastles or small fortlets built at intervals of approximately one Roman mile along Hadrian's Wall (grid reference NY245613).

== Description ==
Milecastle 78 lies halfway between the villages of Glasson and Port Carlisle. It is northwest of an access road to a caravan park. There are no remains visible above ground.

The vallum ditch can be traced in this area as a depression up to 0.8 metres deep.

== Excavations ==
Milecastle 78 was first located and partially excavated in 1934. Only the west wall was examined in the excavations and was found to be 2.8 metres wide. One course of masonry stood upon the inner face; the outer face had been robbed. The excavators did not record whether remains of the earlier turf and timber phase of the milecastle survive.

The milecastle was investigated again in 2000 as part of the Milecastles Project. Trenches were excavated across the west, south, and east walls of the milecastle. The stone milecastle measured approximately 19.2 metres east-west, and 20.7 metres north-south externally. The foundations of the walls were 2.5 metres wide. A burnt feature, possibly a hearth or oven, was found in the southwest corner. No evidence for the Turf Wall milecastle was recovered.

== Associated turrets ==
Each milecastle on Hadrian's Wall had two associated turret structures. These turrets were positioned approximately one-third and two-thirds of a Roman mile to the west of the Milecastle, and would probably have been manned by part of the milecastle's garrison. The turrets associated with Milecastle 78 are known as Turret 78A and Turret 78B.

Turret 78A (Kirkland) (grid reference NY24316175) lies 20 metres northwest of Kirkland farm-buildings in the line of a hedge on the south side of the road. It was identified in the 18th century by the antiquarian John Horsley. The location was confirmed in a trial excavation in 1948. There are no remains visible above ground.

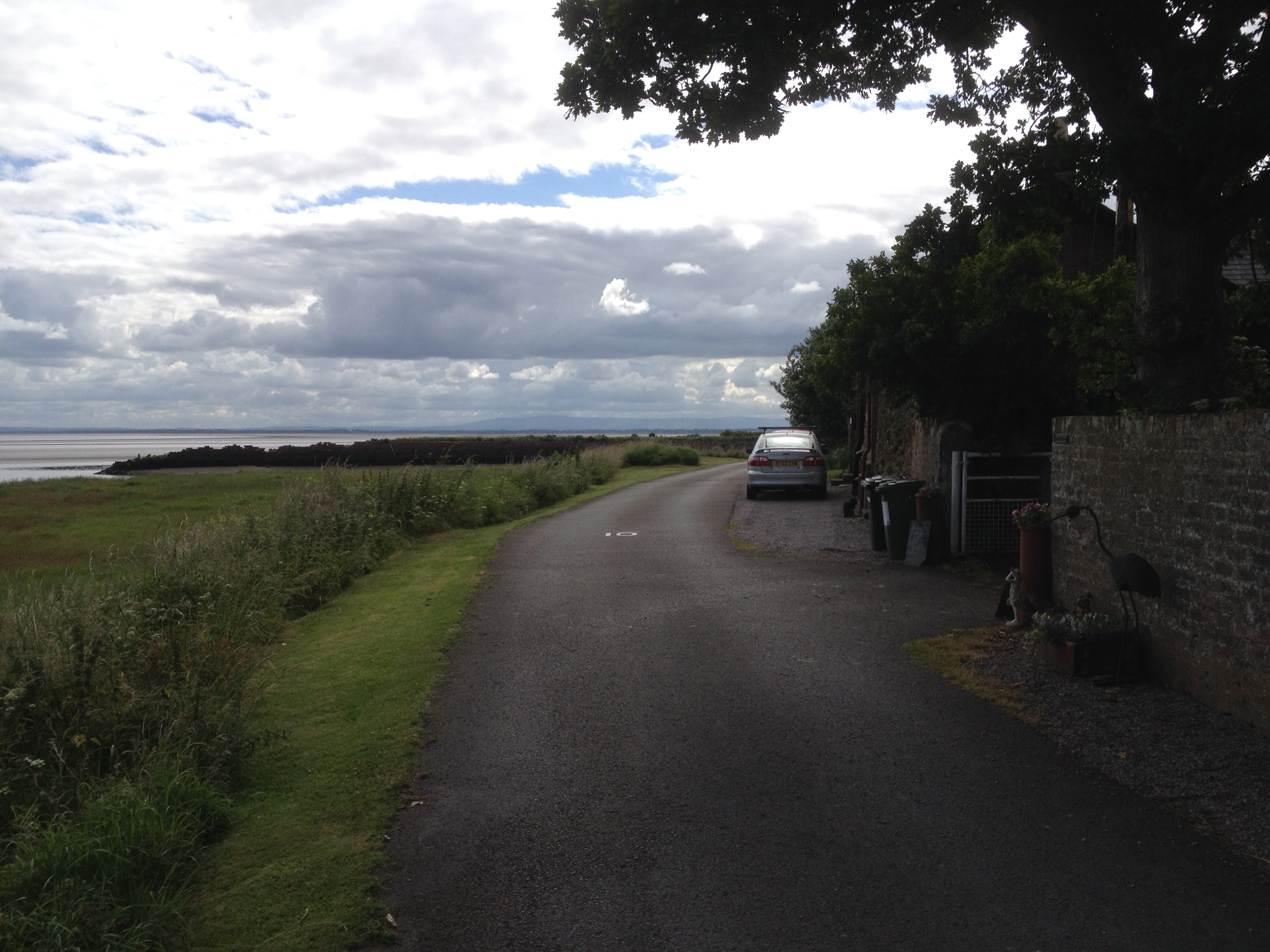
The presumed site of Turret 78B

Turret 78B (grid reference NY24076226) has never been accurately located. Tradition records a mound or tumulus close to its calculated position, and it is claimed that an upright stone (possibly a medieval cross) once stood there. There are no visible remains of a turret, mound, or stone.
