= Drumburgh railway station =

Disused railway station in Cumbria, England

Drumburgh
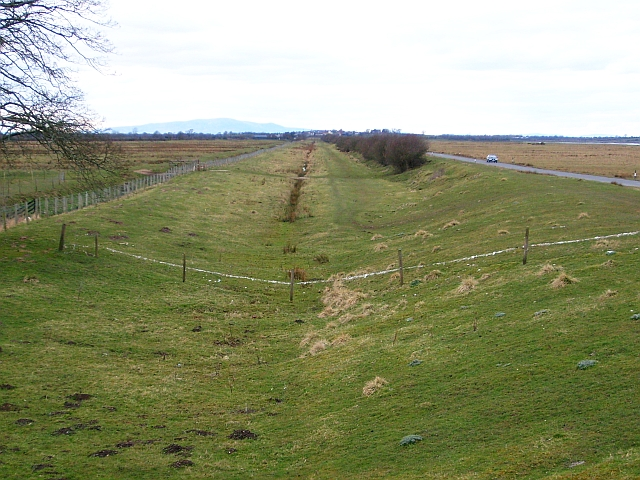
- A section of the old canal and railway near Drumburgh

General information
- Location: Drumburgh, Cumberland; England
- Coordinates: 54.926°N 3.137°W
- Grid reference: NY272596
- Platforms: 2 (Island)

Other information
- Status: Disused

History
- Original company: Port Carlisle Railway
- Pre-grouping: North British Railway
- Post-grouping: London and North Eastern Railway

Key dates
- 1854: Opened
- 4 July 1955: Closed
Location

Drumburgh railway station was near the village of Drumburgh (pronounced "Drumbruff"), Cumbria, England.

It was the junction station for the Port Carlisle Railway branch and the Silloth branch, serving both as a junction and transfer station and also serving the small village of Drumburgh. The station closed on 4 July 1955; nothing now remains of the station. The line to Silloth closed on 7 September 1964 as part of the Beeching cuts. Port Carlisle was two and a half miles away by train and Glasson was one and a quarter miles away. The journey time was nine minutes, although Glasson was a request stop.

== History ==
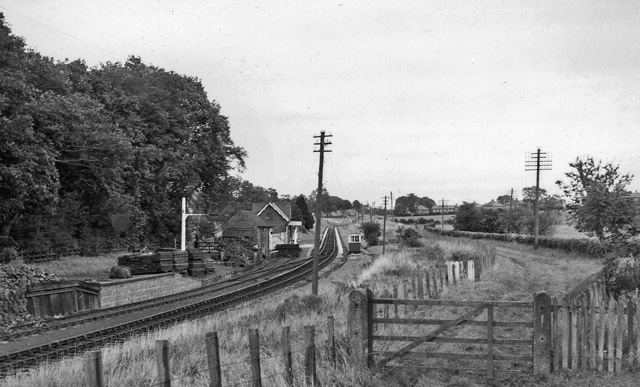
Burgh-by-Sands railway station

In 1819 a port was constructed at Port Carlisle and in 1821, the Carlisle Navigation Canal. was built to take goods to Carlisle. The canal was closed in 1853 and much of it was infilled by the Port Carlisle Railway Company who constructed a railway that started passenger services in 1854, discontinuing them two years later when the Carlisle & Silloth Bay Railway & Dock Company's (C&SBRDC) new railway to Silloth opened, utilising the Port Carlisle Branch as far as Drumburgh. A brief resurgence of business at Port Carlisle had taken place upon the opening of the railway, taken away however by the new port at Silloth and the transfer of the steamer service to Liverpool.

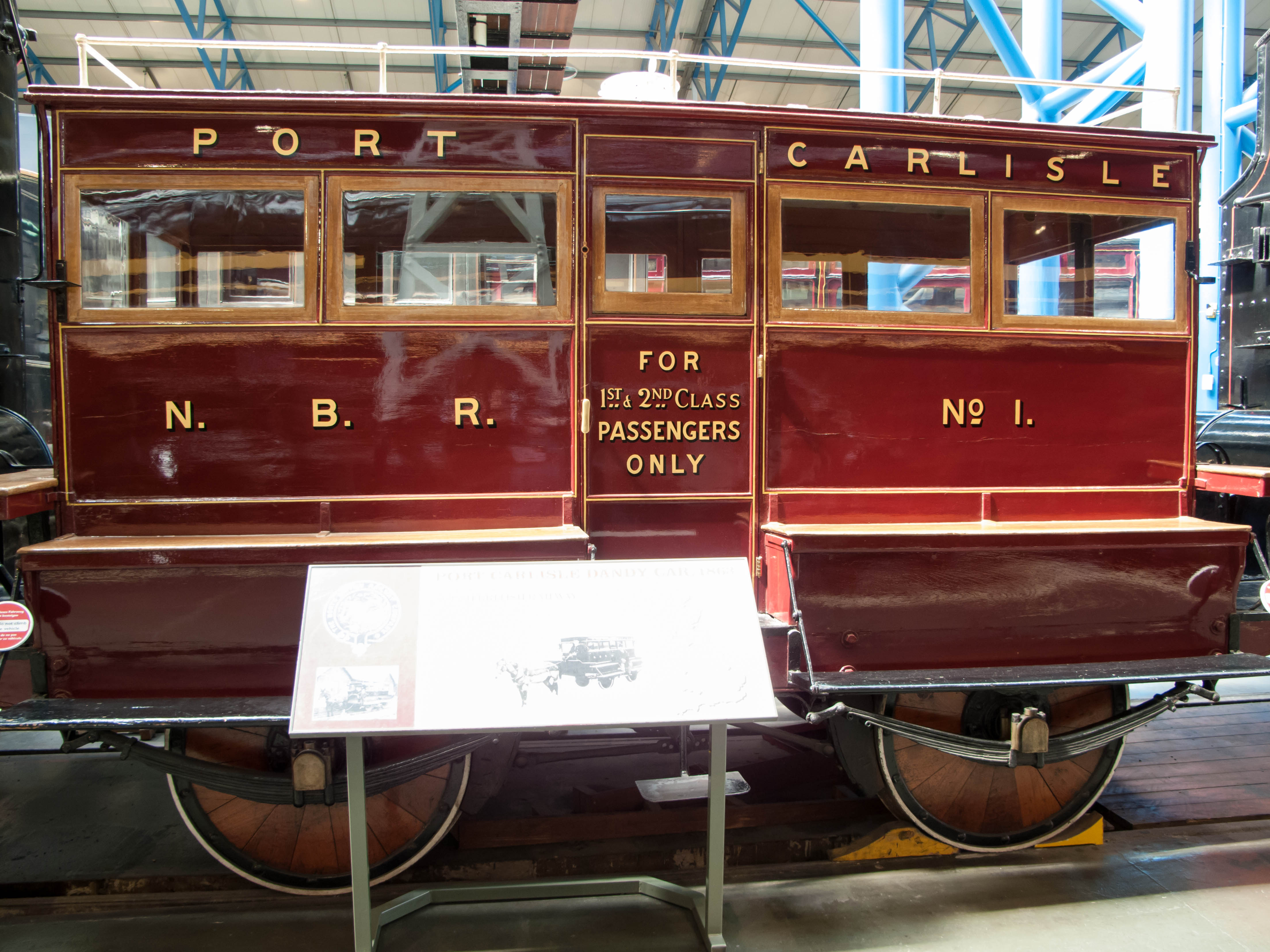
'Dandy', one of the old horse-drawn carriages used on the Port Carlisle – Glasson – Drumburgh line.

To reduce costs a horse-drawn service was provided in 1856 between Drumburgh, Glasson, and Port Carlisle; however, in 1914 steam power was introduced; finally to try to avoid closure a steam railmotor called 'Flower of Yarrow' was built and this service to Port Carlisle railway station via Drumburgh lasted until the branch was closed in 1932. Freight services to Port Carlisle had been withdrawn in 1899. The Port Carlisle Railway Company had agreed to supply a locomotive if the C&SBRDC provided rolling stock. The North British Railway leased the line from 1862; it was absorbed by them in 1880, and then taken over by the London and North Eastern Railway in 1923.

Four horse-drawn 'Dandy cars' were built by the North British Railway. The Dandy car was originally preserved at Carlisle, before being moved to the National Railway Museum at York. The Port Carlisle line became a day tourist attraction to Carlisle Victorians.

The 'Flower of Yarrow' Sentinel Railcar used on the line was driven by James Grey with T. Jackson as the fireman worked on the Port Carlisle Railway in 1932 before its final closure.

On 23 October 1950 a passenger train derailed near Drumburgh killing the Driver & Fireman.

Drumburgh remained open as a station and passing point on the Silloth branch until it closed on 4 July 1955, some years before Silloth railway station. A stub end of track was left in place running towards Glasson.

=== Infrastructure ===
The station sat to the south of the village, reached by minor road; it had a single central or island platform, a shelter and a signal box. A siding was present nearby on the line to Glasson. At Canal Junction the Port Carlisle line made an end on junction with the earlier goods branch from London Road and it was this section on to Drumburgh (pronounced drum-bruff) that was taken over by the Carlisle & Silloth Bay Railway & Dock Company. Immediately west of Drumburgh station the line branched off from the line to Silloth, passing under a minor road to Port Carlisle. The branch ran close to the south bank of the Solway Firth and the course of Hadrians Wall at Glasson and elsewhere, heading over low ground to the terminus of the line at Port Carlisle.

Preceding station	Disused railways	Following station
Burgh-by-Sands; Line and station closed	North British Railway; Port Carlisle Railway Company	Glasson; Line and station closed
Burgh-by-Sands; Line and station closed	North British Railway; Carlisle & Silloth Bay Railway & Dock Company	New Dykes Brow; Line and station closed
