= Glasson railway station =

Disused railway station in Cumbria, England

Glasson
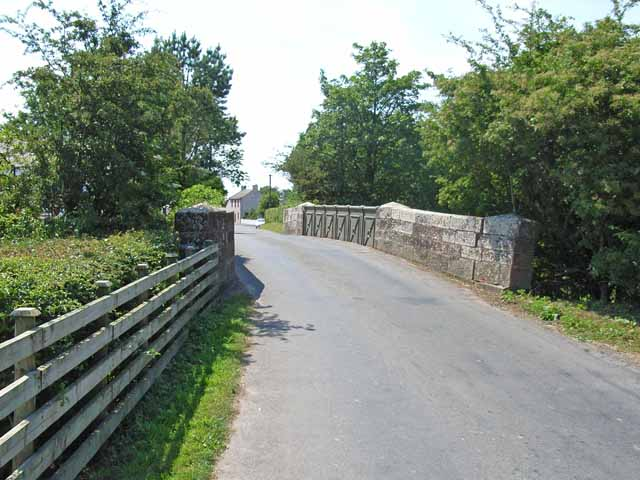
- The railway bridge at the old Glasson Station site

General information
- Location: Glasson, Cumberland; England
- Coordinates: 54.934832°N 3.16613°W
- Grid reference: NY253606
- Platforms: 1

Other information
- Status: Disused

History
- Original company: Port Carlisle Railway
- Pre-grouping: North British Railway
- Post-grouping: London and North Eastern Railway

Key dates
- 22 June 1854: Opened
- 1 January 1917: Closed
- 1 February 1919: opened
- 1 June 1932: Closed
Location

Glasson railway station was a railway station in Glasson, Cumbria, England. It was the last station before the terminus on the Port Carlisle Railway branch, serving the small village of that name. Nothing now remains of the station.

== History ==
A port was built in 1819 at Port Carlisle and in 1821, the eleven-and-a-half-mile-long Carlisle Navigation Canal was built to take goods to Carlisle. The canal was closed in 1853, and the canal basin at Carlisle and parts of the canal were filled in by the Port Carlisle Railway Company which constructed a railway that started passenger services in 1854. However, the Port Carlisle Railway Company discontinued them two years later when the Carlisle & Silloth Bay Railway & Dock Company's (C&SBRDC) new railway to Silloth opened, utilising the Port Carlisle Branch as far as Drumburgh. A brief resurgence of business at Port Carlisle had taken place upon the opening of the railway, taken away however by the new port at Silloth and the transfer of the steamer service to Liverpool.

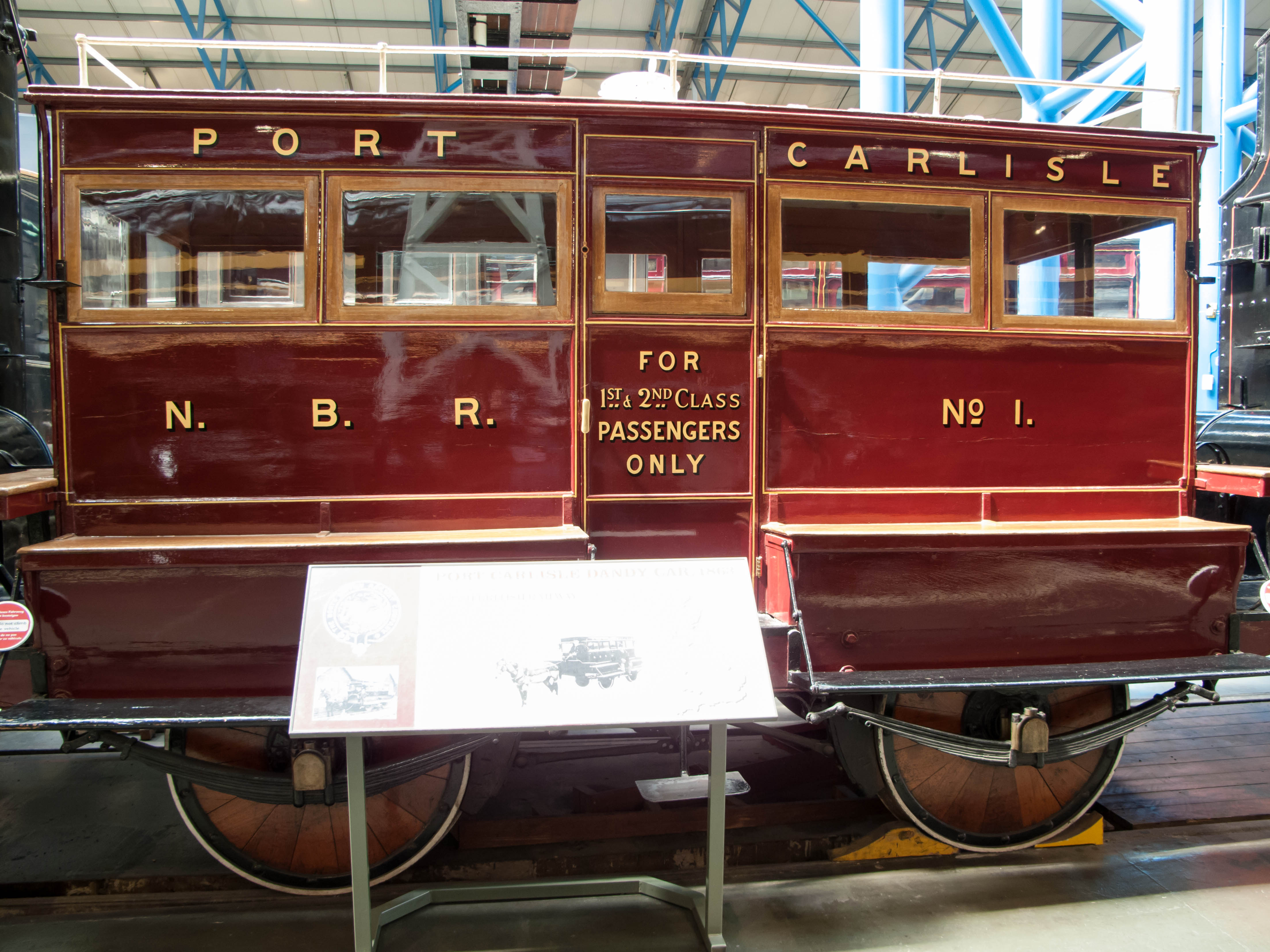
'Dandy', one of the old horse-drawn carriages used on the Port Carlisle - Glasson - Drumburgh line.

To reduce costs, a horse-drawn service was provided in 1856 between Drumburgh, Glasson, and Port Carlisle for a number of years. The horse-drawn train did not always stop, and the passengers were sometimes obliged to carefully jump off; which was not as difficult as it sounds for 3rd Class passengers as they sat outside on benches. The last horse-drawn train ran on Saturday, 4 April 1914 and the first steam-powered train ran on 6 April 1914. In an attempt to stave off closure, one of the first steam railmotors was built and this service to Port Carlisle railway station via Glasson from Drumburgh lasted until the branch was closed in 1932. Freight services had been withdrawn in 1899.

The construction of the Solway railway viaduct of the Solway Junction Railway caused Port Carlisle harbour to silt up and lose trade; this contributed to the abandonment of the Port Carlisle to Carlisle railway via Glasson. The Port Carlisle Railway Company had agreed to supply a locomotive if the C&SBRDC provided rolling stock. The North British Railway leased the line in 1862, it was absorbed by them in 1880, and then taken over by the London and North Eastern Railway in 1923.

=== Infrastructure ===
The station sat close to the village, reached by an entrance off one side of the overbridge; it had a single short platform and a small shelter. No sidings were present. At Canal Junction, the Port Carlisle line made an end on junction with the earlier goods branch from London Road and it was this section on to Drumburgh (pronounced drum-bruff) that was taken over by the Carlisle & Silloth Bay Railway & Dock Company. Immediately west of Drumburgh station, the line branched off from the line to Silloth, passing under a minor road to Port Carlisle. The branch ran close to the south bank of the Solway Firth and the course of Hadrian's Wall at Glasson and elsewhere, heading over low ground to the terminus of the line at Port Carlisle.

The old overbridge, built in 1819–23, in Glasson (NY254606) is a listed structure. It was originally built as a bridge over a canal. It has a cast-iron parapet. The Plinth with rounded corners was originally the supporting structure for the canal drawbridge but increased in height to convert it into a railway bridge. An old canal lock keeper's cottage also survives.

== Micro-history ==
Port Carlisle was one and a quarter miles away by train and Drumburgh was also one and a quarter miles away. The journey time was around four minutes, although Glasson was a request stop.

Four horse-drawn 'Dandy cars' were built by the North British Railway. The Dandy car was originally preserved at Carlisle, before being moved to the National Railway Museum in York. The Port Carlisle line became a day tourist attraction to Carlisle Victorians.

The 'Flower of Yarrow' Sentinel Railcar used on the line was driven by James Grey with T. Jackson as the fireman worked on the Port Carlisle Railway in 1932 before its final closure.

Preceding station	Disused railways	Following station
Drumburgh; Line and station closed	Port Carlisle Railway Company	Port Carlisle; Line and station closed
