= Glasson, Bowness =

Village in Cumbria, England

Coordinates: 54.933361°N 03.168739°W

Glasson
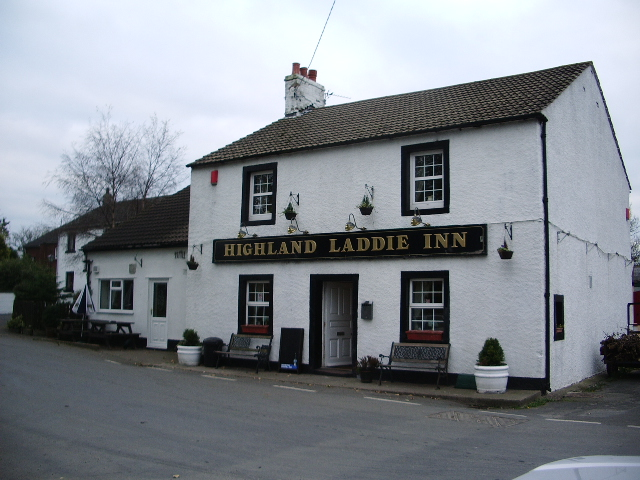
- The Highland Laddie Inn(closed), Glasson

- Location in Allerdale, Cumbria Location within Cumbria
- OS grid reference: NY25216047
- Civil parish: Bowness
- Unitary authority: Cumberland
- Ceremonial county: Cumbria
- Region: North West
- Country: England
- Sovereign state: United Kingdom
- Post town: WIGTON
- Postcode district: CA7
- Dialling code: 016973
- Police: Cumbria
- Fire: Cumbria
- Ambulance: North West
- UK Parliament: Penrith and Solway

Glasson is a village in Cumbria, England, just inland from the Solway coast, eight miles (13 km) northwest of Carlisle on the course of Hadrian's Wall near Drumburgh. The place name derives from the Anglo-Scandinavian glaise, meaning "a small stream".

== History ==
The line of the Vallum (National Monument number 26122) of Hadrians Wall, dating from 128AD-130AD runs through the village. No trace of the vallum is now visible within the village itself, however its earthworks are clearly visible in the fields to the east. A sandstone building stone inscribed "Legions II Aug Coh III" was found in the vicinity of Glasson in the 18th century.

The earliest map from the mid-eighteenth century shows a rural village aligned along the course of the old vallum and made up of 21 dwellings. The 1838 tithe map shows 32 dwelling in Glasson with the same alignment. Between 1864 and 1926 the OS maps show that the village experienced a gradual expansion up to approximately 68 dwellings, aided by the establishment of the railway station on the line to Port Carlisle and to Carlisle via Drumburgh.

The village lies in the old Barony of Burgh, dating from 1092, the baron now being the Earl of Lonsdale. The barony was a bulwark against Scottish invasion across the Solway

== Transport ==
=== Canals ===
The Carlisle Navigation Canal (1821–1853) ran slightly to the east of the village, reaching the Solway at Port Carlisle. The Port Carlisle Railway Company filled in the canal and rail passenger services commenced in 1854. The old overbridge, with a cast-iron parapet, built in 1819-23 at NY254606 is a listed structure and was originally built as a bridge over canal. The plinth with rounded corners was originally the supporting structure for the canal drawbridge, increased in height to convert it to a railway bridge. An old canal lock keepers cottage also survives.

=== Railways ===
Glasson railway station was the intermediate station on the old Port Carlisle branch line from Carlisle, diverging at the junction near Drumburgh. It had a single platform and a shelter. A horse-drawn passenger service was provided between Drumburgh and Port Carlisle through Glasson from 1856, replaced in 1914 by steam propulsion until a steam railmotor 'Flower of Yarrow' was introduced, running until the branch closed in 1932.

== Natural history ==
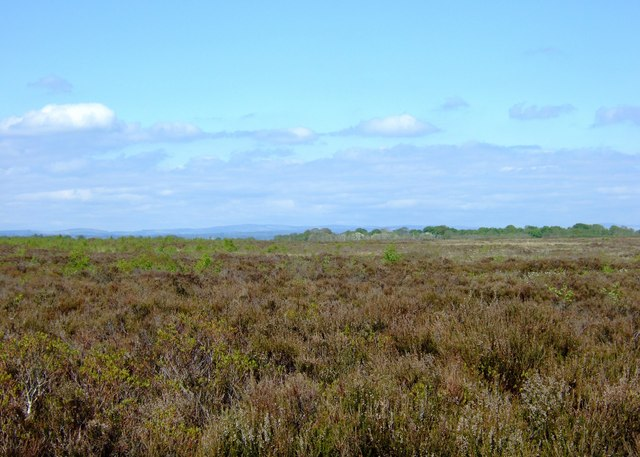
Glasson Moss National Nature Reserve

Glasson Moss NNR lies near the village. Much of the area was worked for peat in the past, however it is the best preserved of the Solway Mosses with a typical moss carpet and flora and notable bryophytes and invertebrates.

== See also ==
- Listed buildings in Bowness
