= Milecastle 80 =

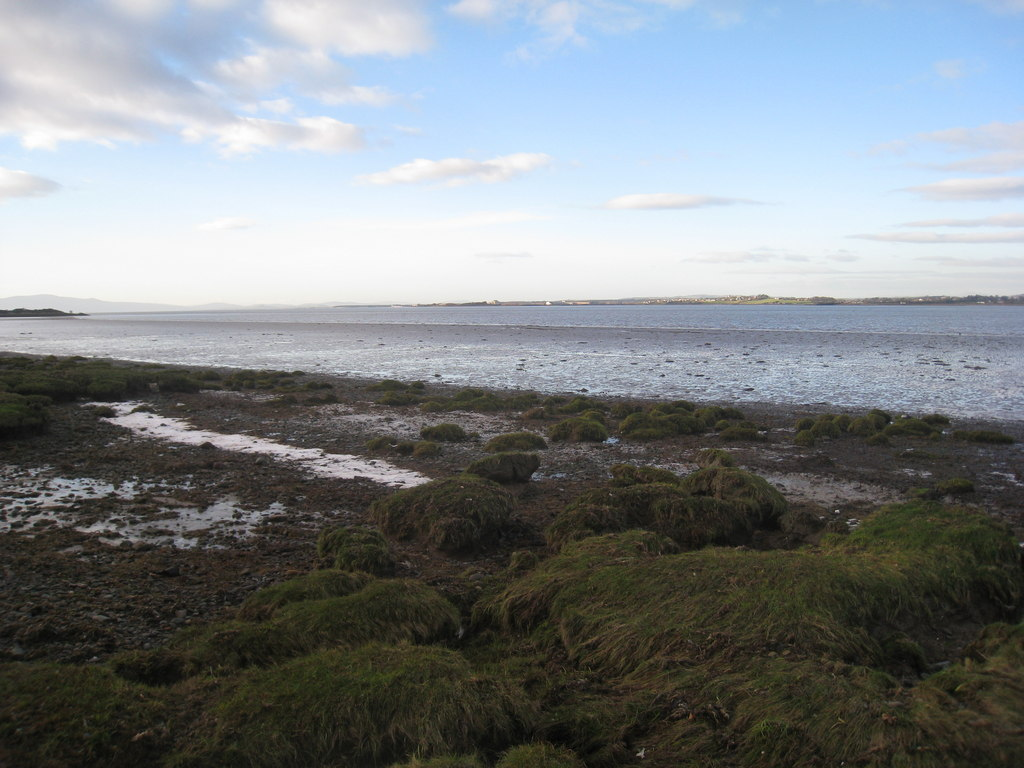
- View over the Solway Firth near the site of Milecastle 80

- Location within Cumbria
- 54.952908°N 3.215155°W
- Type: Milecastle
- Location: Cumbria, England

Milecastle 80 was one of a series of Milecastles or small fortlets built at intervals of approximately one Roman mile along Hadrian's Wall (grid reference NY22276270).

== Description ==
The site of Milecastle 80 is in the village of Bowness-on-Solway. The location corresponds to the site of the Roman fort at Bowness (Maia). It was presumably replaced by the fort, but the milecastle has not been located in excavations of the fort. It is possible that coastal erosion has removed at least some of the remains.

It would be expected that Hadrian's Wall terminated here. However, in 1707 Bishop William Nicolson apparently saw an extension of Hadrian's wall about a quarter of a mile west of Bowness. This would be the equivalent of the spur wall at the east end of the Wall at Wallsend. However, its precise location and survival have not been confirmed since.

== Associated turrets ==
Each milecastle on Hadrian's Wall had two associated turret structures. These turrets were positioned approximately one-third and two-thirds of a Roman mile to the west of the Milecastle, and would probably have been manned by part of the milecastle's garrison. However, on the assumption that Hadrian's Wall terminated at Bowness, it is assumed that any structures to the west of Bowness would be part of the Cumbrian Coast defences beginning with Milefortlet 1. The possible turrets between Milecastle 80 and Milefortlet 1 are known as Tower 0A (grid reference NY217624) and Tower 0B (grid reference NY212622). There is currently no evidence for the existence of either tower.
