= Burgh-by-Sands railway station =

Disused railway station in Cumbria, England

Burgh-by-Sands
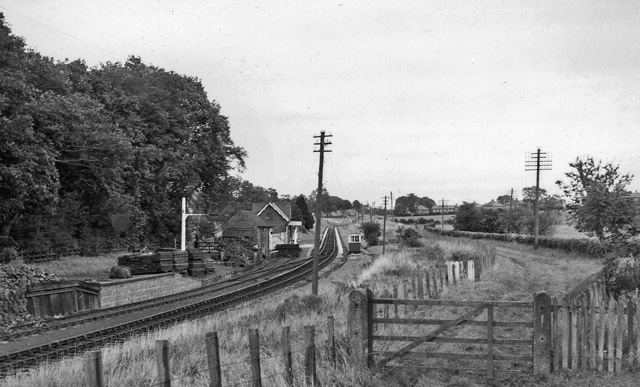
- Burgh-by-Sands station

General information
- Location: Burgh-by-Sands, Cumberland; England
- Coordinates: 54.9200°N 3.0585°W
- Grid reference: NY322588
- Platforms: 1

Other information
- Status: Disused

History
- Original company: Port Carlisle Railway
- Pre-grouping: North British Railway
- Post-grouping: London and North Eastern Railway

Key dates
- 1854: Opened as "Burgh"
- 7 September 1964: Closed
Location
- Location within the former City of Carlisle district Location within Cumbria

Burgh-by-Sands railway station was originally named Burgh (pronounced "Bruff"). It opened in 1854 on the Port Carlisle Railway branch and later the Silloth branch, serving the village of Burgh in Cumberland - now Cumbria - England. The line and station closed on 7 September 1964 as part of the Beeching cuts.

In 2014 the station building survived as a private dwelling.

== History ==
In 1819 a port was constructed at Port Carlisle and in 1821, the Carlisle Navigation Canal was built to take goods to Carlisle. The canal was closed in 1853 and much of it was infilled by the Port Carlisle Railway Company who constructed a railway that started passenger services in 1854, discontinuing them two years later when the Carlisle & Silloth Bay Railway & Dock Company's (C&SBRDC) new railway to Silloth opened, utilising the Port Carlisle Branch as far as Drumburgh. Opened as Burgh railway station, it was renamed Burgh-by-Sands in 1923.

The North British Railway leased the line from 1862, it was absorbed by them in 1880, and then taken over by the London and North Eastern Railway in 1923.

=== Infrastructure ===
The station sat close the village, reached by Station Road that branched off the mainstreet; it had a single platform, a shelter and a signal box. The branch ran close to the course of Hadrians Wall. A substantial station building was present, together with a station master's house.

== Micro-history ==
In the 1930s a Walter Tait was the station master.

Preceding station	Disused railways	Following station
Kirkandrews; Line and station closed	North British Railway; Carlisle and Silloth Bay Railway	Drumburgh; Line and station closed
