= Fingland =

Hamlet in Cumbria, England

Coordinates: 54.902°N 3.162°W

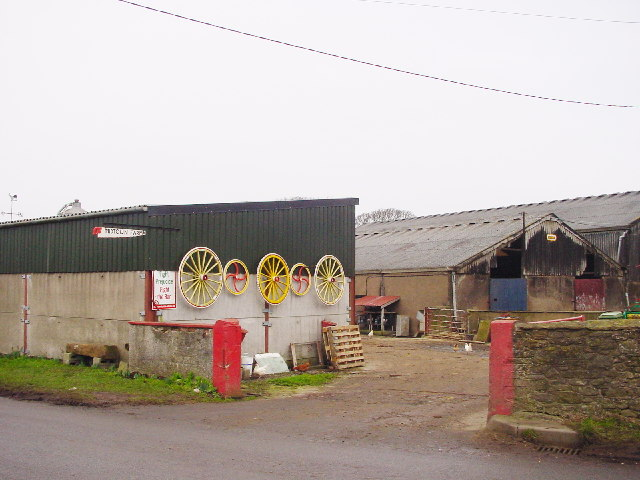
- Midtown Farm, Fingland

- Location in Allerdale, Cumbria Location within Cumbria
- OS grid reference: NY254569
- Civil parish: Bowness
- Unitary authority: Cumberland
- Ceremonial county: Cumbria
- Region: North West
- Country: England
- Sovereign state: United Kingdom
- Post town: WIGTON
- Postcode district: CA7
- Dialling code: 016973
- Police: Cumbria
- Fire: Cumbria
- Ambulance: North West
- UK Parliament: Penrith and Solway

Fingland is a hamlet in the Cumberland district, in the county of Cumbria, England. Fingland is located on the B5307 road in between the villages of Kirkbride and Kirkbampton. In 1870–72 the township had a population of 219. There is a farm called Fingland Rigg nearby, which gives its name to Finglandrigg Woods National Nature Reserve.

It was called Thingland in the Middle Ages (Thingland in 1279) meaning "place of the a Scandinavian ting, assembly". There is a similar place-name in Normandy near Jobourg (Cotentin) : le Tingland.

== See also ==
- Listed buildings in Bowness
