= Aballava =

Roman fort in Cumbria, England

- Cumbria, England
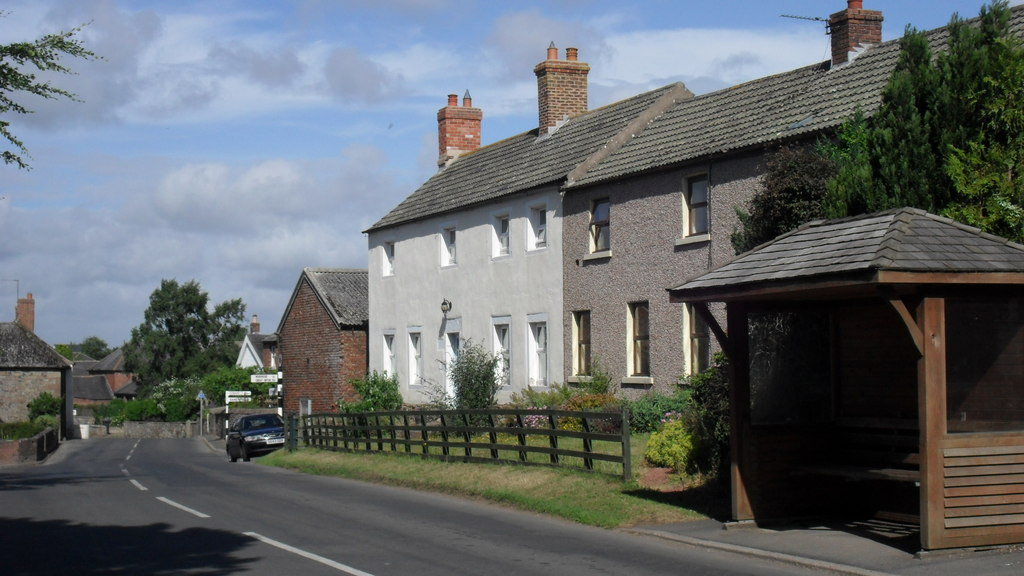
- Village centre of Burgh by Sands, the site of Aballava

Location
- Location in the former Carlisle district, Cumbria Location in Cumbria, England
- Coordinates: 54.922°N 3.050°W
- Grid reference: NY327591

Aballava or Aballaba (with the modern name of Burgh by Sands) was a Roman fort on Hadrian's Wall, between Petriana (Stanwix) to the east and Coggabata (Drumburgh) to the west. It is about one and a half miles south of the Solway Firth, and its purpose was to guard the south end of two important Solway fords, the Peat Wath and the Sandwath, which were also to become favourite routes for medieval border raiders.

The name 'Aballava' probably comes from the British Celtic for '(apple) orchard'. The fort is five and a half miles west of Stanwix. The fort was an oblong, straddling the Wall, and measured 500 feet (150 m) north to south by 400 feet (120 m) east to west, occupying an area of 5 acres (20,000 m^{2}). Only the location of the eastern wall is known for certain. It is believed that it was built over the site of turret 71b. There is a fortified border church on the site built almost entirely of Roman stones, and it is believed that this stands on the site of the principia of the fort.

There was a vicus to the south-west of the fort, and it is believed that a cemetery existed to the south of the fort.

== Garrison ==
The second-century garrison was the Ala I Tungrorum followed by a part-mounted cavalry regiment, Cohors I Nerviorum. The third-century garrison was a mounted detachment (cuneus) of Frisians. The epigraphic evidence for the location of this unit is attested by two sandstone altars found in the 19th century at Cockermouth Castle in Cumbria. These most probably came originally from the nearby Roman fort at Papcastle (Derventio). Some confusion had previously arisen among Romano-British historians concerning the precise location of Aballava and its identification with Papcastle. It has now been recognized that the Roman fort at Burgh by Sands is the correct location. The unit, (Cuneus Frisiorum) apparently remained there long enough to acquire the title, 'Aballavensium'. In the mid-third century an infantry detachment (numerus) of Aurelian Moors (Morocco) is also attested.

== Excavations ==
Excavations carried out in 1922 established that the fort straddled the Wall. Two other forts were found on the same site, by aerial photography, in 1976 and 1977. The second fort, discovered in 1976, and excavated 13 years later, is thought to pre-date Hadrian's Wall. It has been claimed that this fort was an extension to the Stanegate system of forts, but this is largely conjecture.

A small-scale excavation 200 metres south of the fort undertaken by Headland Archaeology uncovered a group of features associated with the vicus. Features included post-pits for a substantial building, postholes and beamslots relating to other timber buildings and shallow ditches and gullies; all dated to the mid-2nd century. There was no evidence for the later 2nd and 3rd century occupation identified during the previous investigations, suggesting some discontinuity in the use of the site.

== In fiction ==
- Gillian Bradshaw, Dark North (2007) Set in Roman Britain in 208 AD, it looks at the troubled reign of Emperor Septimius Severus — and his attempt to conquer Scotland — through the eyes of Memnon, an Ethiopian cavalry scout with the numerus of Aurelian Moors based at the Wall fort of Aballava.
