= St Michael's Church, Bowness-on-Solway =

Coordinates: 54.9524°N 3.2135°W

St Michael's Church
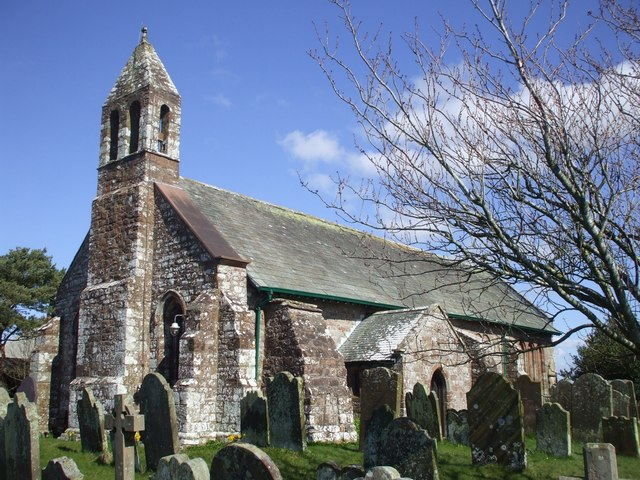
- St Michael's Church from the southwest

- Location in Allerdale, Cumbria Location in Cumbria, England
- OS grid reference: NY 224,627
- Location: Bowness-on-Solway, Cumbria
- Country: England
- Denomination: Anglican
- Website: St Michael, Bowness-on-Solway

History
- Status: Parish church
- Dedication: Saint Michael

Architecture
- Functional status: Active
- Heritage designation: Grade II*
- Designated: 11 April 1967
- Architect(s): Paley, Austin and Paley (north transept)
- Style: Norman, English Gothic architecture, Gothic Revival
- Groundbreaking: 12th century

Specifications
- Materials: Sandstone, slate roofs

Administration
- Province: York
- Diocese: Carlisle
- Archdeaconry: Carlisle
- Deanery: Carlisle
- Parish: Bowness

Clergy
- Vicar: Revd Peter Blackett

St Michael's Church is in the village of Bowness-on-Solway, Cumbria, England. It is an active Anglican parish church in the deanery of Carlisle, the archdeaconry of Carlisle, and the diocese of Carlisle. Its benefice is united with those of St Bride, Kirkbride, and St John the Evangelist, Newton Arlosh. The church is recorded in the National Heritage List for England as a designated Grade II* listed building.

== History ==
The church dates from the 12th century, with a restoration in the 18th century. A north transept was added in 1891 by the Lancaster architects Paley, Austin and Paley.

== Architecture ==
=== Exterior ===
St Michael's is constructed in red and calciferous sandstone, taken from the nearby Hadrian's Wall, with a green slate roof. Its plan consists of a four-bay nave, a south porch, a north transept, and a single-bay chancel with a north vestry. At the west end of the church is a double bellcote, standing on a large buttress; it has arched openings and is surmounted by an oblong pyramidal roof. There are doorways on the north and south sides of the church, both of which are Norman. Both are damaged and have one order of columns. There is also one Norman window on the north side of the chancel; the other windows are Victorian. Most of these are lancet windows, other than the three-light windows in the east and south walls of the chancel.

=== Interior ===
The font is Norman, and stands on a shaft dating from 1848. The stained glass in the east window dates from 1891, and is by Daniel Bell. The rest of the glass is from the 20th century. In the north transept are windows by Clayton and Bell dated 1900, and by Powells, dated 1918. On the west side of the church are two windows by Millican, Baguley and Atkinson of Newcastle, dated 1954. On the south side is a window by A. E. Buss, dated 1957, depicting the Good Samaritan, and windows by R. R. Nichol, dated 1990, showing Christ with young people, and Alex Haynes, dated 1999, depicting Saint Michael.

== See also ==
- Grade II* listed buildings in Cumberland
- Listed buildings in Bowness
- List of works by Paley, Austin and Paley
