= Kirkandrews =

Kirkandrews or Kirkanders may refer to:

- Kirkandrews, Dumfries and Galloway, hamlet in Dumfries and Galloway, Scotland
- Kirkandrews-on-Eden, village and former civil parish in Beaumont civil parish, Carlisle, Cumbria, England
  - Kirkandrews railway station, a former station
- Kirkandrews-on-Esk, civil parish in Carlisle, Cumbria, England
