= Listed buildings in Bowness-on-Solway =

Bowness-on-Solway is a civil parish in the Cumberland district in Cumbria, England. It contains 36 listed buildings that are recorded in the National Heritage List for England. Of these, one is listed at Grade I, the highest of the three grades, two are at Grade II*, the middle grade, and the others are at Grade II, the lowest grade. The parish contains the village of Bowness-on-Solway, and the settlements of Port Carlisle, Glasson, Drumburgh, Easton, Fingland, Whitrigg, and Anthorn. Because of its proximity to the Scottish border, it contains fortified houses, some of which have survived and are listed. Hadrian's Wall passes through the parish, and a number of listed buildings are constructed in material taken from the wall. In the early 19th century the Carlisle Canal was built, and was later replaced by the Port Carlisle Dock and Railway. Some structures remain from this and are listed. Otherwise, most of the listed buildings are houses and associated structures, farmhouses and farm buildings. The other listed buildings include a medieval cross, a church, a war memorial, and a public house.

== Key ==
Grade	Criteria
I	Buildings of exceptional interest, sometimes considered to be internationally important
II*	Particularly important buildings of more than special interest
II	Buildings of national importance and special interest

== Buildings ==
Name and location	Photograph	Date	Notes	Grade
Anthorn Cross; 54.90656°N 3.26535°W	—	Medieval (probable)	The cross is in sandstone, and consists of a rough, weathered cross-shaped stone set into the ground.	II
St Michael's Church; 54.95242°N 3.21360°W		12th century	The church was restored in the 18th century and extended in 1891. It is built in calciferous sandstone and red sandstone, some of it from Hadrian's Wall, on a chamfered plinth, and has a green slate roof. The church consists of a nave, a south porch, a north transept, a chancel, and a north vestry, On the west gable is an open twin bellcote. Some Norman features have been retained, and most of the windows are lancets. The font has a Norman bowl on a 19th-century shaft.	II*
Drumburgh Castle; 54.92716°N 3.14725°W		13th century	A fortified house that was altered in the 14th, 15th and 19th centuries. It is built in sandstone from Hadrian's Wall on a chamfered plinth with a green slate roof. Over the entrance is a parapet with carved stone eagle finials. The house has a rectangular plan, with three storeys and five bays, and there is a single-storey single-bay extension to the left. There is a 19th-century porch on the ground floor, and steps leading up to another entrance on the first floor; above its doorway is a carved coat of arms. The lower two floor have sash windows, and in the top floor are mullioned windows with sliding sashes. The right wall was rebuilt in the 1970s, and has a central buttress and a corbelled-out embattled parapet.	I
Barracks House; 54.93390°N 3.16733°W		Early or mid 16th century	A fortified house that was altered in the 18th and 20th centuries. It has thick walls built in sandstone from Hadrian's Wall, and a 20th-century tile roof. There are two storeys and three bays. In the walls are blocked arrow slits. Many of the other original openings are also blocked, and the current windows and door date from the 20th century. In one of the gable walls is a datestone from the 1760s. Inside the house, one of the walls contains the remains of a stone spiral staircase.	II
Stone barn, Brackenrigg; 54.94120°N 3.20061°W	—	Early or mid 16th century	Originally a fortified house, it has been converted into a barn. It has thick walls in calciferous and red sandstone from Hadrian's Wall, with quoins and a green slate roof. There are two storeys and two bays, with an additional bay to the right in cobble. The doorway has a moulded architrave, and above it is a loft entrance. There are original slit vents on two levels. The extension contains a doorway and a casement window.	II
Former house to east of Bowness House Farmhouse; 54.95291°N 3.21387°W	—	17th century (probable)	Originally a house, later used an outbuilding, its façade dates from the early 18th century. It is built in calciferous and red sandstone from Hadrian's Wall, and has a green slate roof. There are two storeys and three bays, and the windows are sashes. The round-headed doorway has a moulded surround with impost blocks and an open-pedimented cornice. In the rear wall are the remains of mullioned windows.	II
Fingland Farmhouse and barn 54.90323°N 3.16376°W	—	Late 17th century (probable)	The farmhouse was altered in 1735. The house and barn are in clay on a stone plinth. They have been repaired with cobbles, raised in height with brick, and rendered; the buildings have a 20th-century Welsh slate roof. The house has two storeys and three bays, and contains a doorway that has a stone architrave with a dated and inscribed entablature. The central windows in both floors are mullioned, other windows are sashes, and there is a fire window. Inside the house is an inglenook, and in the roof are two full cruck trusses and three upper crucks.	II*
Cardurnock Farmhouse; 54.91755°N 3.29291°W	—	Late 17th or early 18th century	The farmhouse is in rendered clay and it has a green slate roof. There are two storeys and three bays, a 20th-century door in a 19th-century surround, and casement windows.	II
Easton Hall and outbuilding 54.92108°N 3.12998°W	—	1724	A rendered farmhouse on a chamfered plinth with quoins and a green slate roof. It has two storeys and five bays with sash windows. Two semicircular steps lead up to a central round-headed doorway with moulded pilasters, a fanlight, a decorated keystone, and an open dated and inscribed swan-neck pediment. The attached outbuilding to the left is in sandstone with a sandstone slate roof, it is lower with two storeys and two bays, and has a doorway with a chamfered surround and an inscribed lintel, a loft door, and a casement window.	II
Garden wall, Easton Hall; 54.92104°N 3.13012°W	—	Early 18th century	The low garden wall and gate piers are in sandstone. The wall has quoins and chamfered coping. The gate piers are rusticated and have pineapple finials.	II
Ole Croft; 54.93383°N 3.16825°W	—	1728	Originally a farmhouse, later converted into a private house, it was extended in the 19th century. The house is rendered with pilastered quoins on the left, and has a Welsh slate roof. There are two storeys and five bays, the left two bays being from the extension. The doorway has a quoined surround, and the windows are sashes.	II
Anthorn Hall; 54.90953°N 3.26260°W	—	1737	A rendered house with a green slate roof. It has two storeys and two bays, with a lower two-storey one-bay extension to the right. The doorway has a stone architrave and a shaped lintel containing an inscription and the date. The windows are sashes.	II
High House; 54.90262°N 3.16087°W	—	1742	A farmhouse in brick on a chamfered plinth with quoins and a Welsh slate roof with eaves modillions. It has two storeys and five bays, and sash windows in architraves. The doorway has a moulded architrave, an inscribed and dated frieze, and a swan-neck pediment with a decorated tympanum. Above the doorway is a stair window.	II
Anthorn House; 54.90996°N 3.26204°W	—	1746	A brick farmhouse on a chamfered plinth with quoins and a green slate roof. It has two storeys and four bays, with a single-bay extension to the left. The doorway is in the extension, and has an architrave with a dated and inscribed entablature. The windows are sashes, also with architraves.	II
Bowness House Farmhouse and Bowness House; 54.95286°N 3.21405°W		18th century	Originally one farmhouse, later divided into two dwellings, it is roughcast with quoins and a green slate roof. It has two storeys and three bays in an L-shaped plan, and the windows are sashes.	II
Orchard House Farmhouse and barn 54.91091°N 3.26079°W	—	Mid 18th century	The farmhouse and barn have roofs of green slate. The house is in rendered brick on a chamfered plinth, with quoins and a plain cornice. It has two storeys and three bays, and contains a doorway and sash windows, all with architraves. The barn is dated 1786, it has two storeys and three bays, and contains doorways, blocked ventilation slits and a blocked loft doorway.	II
Westfield House, outbuildings and cottage 54.94020°N 3.17133°W	—	Mid 18th century	The buildings have roofs mainly of green slate, with some Welsh slate. The farmhouse is stuccoed, with pilastered quoins and sash windows. It has two storeys and three bays. The outbuildings are in cobble and sandstone, they form three sides of the farmyard, and are partly rendered. The buildings are in one and two storeys, and contain doorways, sash windows, and a loading door. The cottage is rendered and has sash windows.	II
Longcroft Farmhouse; 54.91187°N 3.22715°W	—	Late 18th century	The farmhouse was extended in the 19th century. It is rendered with quoins and a slate roof. It has two storeys and three bays, with a lower two-storey three-bay extension. The doorway has a radial fanlight and an open pediment, and the windows are sashes.	II
The Grange and outbuildings 54.92792°N 3.14867°W	—	Late 18th or early 19th century	A rendered house with a green slate roof, in two storeys and five bays. It has sash windows and a doorway with a pilastered surround, a fanlight, and a cornice. To the left is a former stable and barn including a loft door. To the rear is a T-shaped two-storey extension with cobble walls.	II
Marsh House and barn 54.92161°N 3.12994°W	—	Late 18th or early 19th century	The farmhouse and attached barn have green slate roofs. The house is stuccoed on a chamfered plinth with quoins and an eaves cornice. It has two storeys and three bays, and contains sash windows that have flat arches and false keystones. The doorway has a projecting Tuscan porch with an ornamental frieze and a dentilled cornice. The long barn to the right is in cobbles and has two storeys. It contains sash windows, some of which are blocked, and a ventilation slit.	II
Post Office, Hazeldene, Sea View, Harbour View, Dalvean, and Galegarth; 54.94758°N 3.18634°W	—	1810	A terrace consisting of a former post office and five houses. Hazeldene and Sea View are the oldest, the others dating from about 1830. The houses are in red and yellow sandstone with a moulded cornice and a Welsh slate roof; the end houses also have quoins. All the houses have two storeys and two bays, apart from the former post office at the left end, which has three bays. All the doorways are round-headed with fanlights and keystones. The former post office has single-storey canted bay windows. Otherwise, some of the windows in the terrace are sashes, and others are modern replacements.	II
Canal Aqueduct; 54.92497°N 3.11908°W	—	1819–23	The aqueduct was built to carry the Carlisle Canal over Fresh Creek. When the canal closed, it was used as a bridge for the Port Carlisle Dock and Railway Company. The aqueduct is in brick with sandstone coping, and consists of two small arches with plank doors. The parapets have serpentine curves.	II
Canal lock 54.94791°N 3.18617°W	—	1819–23	The lock was built on the Carlisle Canal, and is constructed in red sandstone ashlar.	II
Easton Bridge; 54.92595°N 3.13175°W	—	1819–23	The bridge was built to carry a road over the Carlisle Canal. When the canal closed, it was extended and its height was raised in 1853–54 for the Port Carlisle Dock and Railway Company, but it is now unused. It is in calciferous and red sandstone, and has a central cast iron parapet on wooden pillars.	II
Glasson Bridge; 54.93453°N 3.16617°W		1819–23	The bridge was built for the Carlisle Canal, and extended in 1853–54 for the Port Carlisle Dock and Railway Company, which closed in 1932. It is in calciferous and red sandstone, and has a cast iron parapet.	II
Sea lock and wharf 54.94901°N 3.18609°W		1819–23	The lock and wharf, now disused, were built for the Carlisle Canal. They are in sandstone with granite blocks on the seaward corner. There are recesses for two lock gates that are now missing. The lock wall continues at right angles to form a wharf.	II
Bowder House; 54.95255°N 3.21467°W	—	Early 19th century	A rendered house on a plinth with a green slate roof. It has two storeys and two bays, and contains sash windows with architraves. There are two doorways, each having a fanlight with a pilastered surround, and a modillioned cornice.	II
Bowness Hall; 54.94488°N 3.20782°W		Early 19th century	A brick house on a chamfered plinth, with quoins and a green slate roof. It has two storeys and three bays, and the windows are sashes. The central doorway has pilasters and an open pediment.	II
Eden View, Solway Side, The Dunes, Northlands, Sandheys, Eskdale, Dearham and The Hollies; 54.94799°N 3.18688°W	—	Early 19th century	A terrace of eight sandstone houses on a plinth, with a moulded cornice, and roofs of Welsh and green slate. Some of the houses are stuccoed and others are cement rendered. All the houses have two storeys, and most have two bays, except Sandheys and The Hollies, which have three. The left five houses have round-headed doorways with fanlights and false keystones. Eskdale, Dearham and The Hollies have square-headed doorways, and The Hollies also has engaged columns. Some of the windows are sashes, and others are later replacements.	II
Habberley Cottage, Greenside, and Hope and Anchor Inn; 54.94857°N 3.18762°W		Early 19th century	A public house and three houses forming a terrace, built in sandstone and split cobbles. They have two storeys, and each building has three bays and sash windows. Habberley Cottage, on the left, is the earliest; it has a green slate roof, quoins and a doorway with a pilastered surround and a cornice on consoles. Greenside, in the middle, has been divided into two dwellings, and has a Welsh slate roof. The public house also has a Welsh slate roof, and is rendered with a 20th-century porch.	II
Hesket House; 54.94942°N 3.18859°W	—	Early 19th century	Originally a public house, later used as a farmhouse, it is in sandstone and split cobbles on a chamfered plinth, with quoins and a green slate roof. The house has two storeys and three bays, and contains sash windows. The doorway has a moulded pilastered surround, a triglyph frieze, and a dentilled cornice. Built into the wall above the doorway is a Roman altar.	II
Marine Cottage; 54.94909°N 3.18826°W	—	Early 19th century	A rendered house on a plinth, with quoins on the left corner, a dentilled cornice and a Welsh slate roof. It has two storeys and two bays, and sash windows in plain surrounds. The doorway has a pilastered surround and a fanlight that has a moulded arch with a false keystone.	II
Marsh House; 54.90985°N 3.20783°W	—	Early 19th century	A rendered house with quoins and a green slate roof. It has two storeys and two bays, with a single-storey two-bay extension to the right. The windows are sashes.	II
Whitrigg House; 54.91457°N 3.20141°W	—	Early 19th century	A brick farmhouse on a chamfered stone plinth with rusticated quoins, a plain cornice, and a Welsh slate roof. There are two storeys and three bays. The house has a doorway with pilasters, a fanlight, and an open pediment, and the windows are sashes.	II
Solway House; 54.94835°N 3.18733°W	—	c. 1830	Originally a hotel, later converted into a private house, it is stuccoed with quoins, a moulded cornice, and a green slate roof. The house has two storeys and five bays. There is a protruding Ionic porch, a doorway with a fanlight, and sash windows.	II
War memorial 54.95233°N 3.21419°W		1920	The war memorial is by the entrance to the churchyard of St Michael's Church. It is in polished red granite, and consists of a Latin cross with a simple foot, on a tall plinth on a base of two steps. The top of the plinth is decorated, and below are an inscription and the names of those lost in the two World Wars.	II
