= Kirkandrews railway station =

Disused railway station in Cumbria, England

Kirkandrews
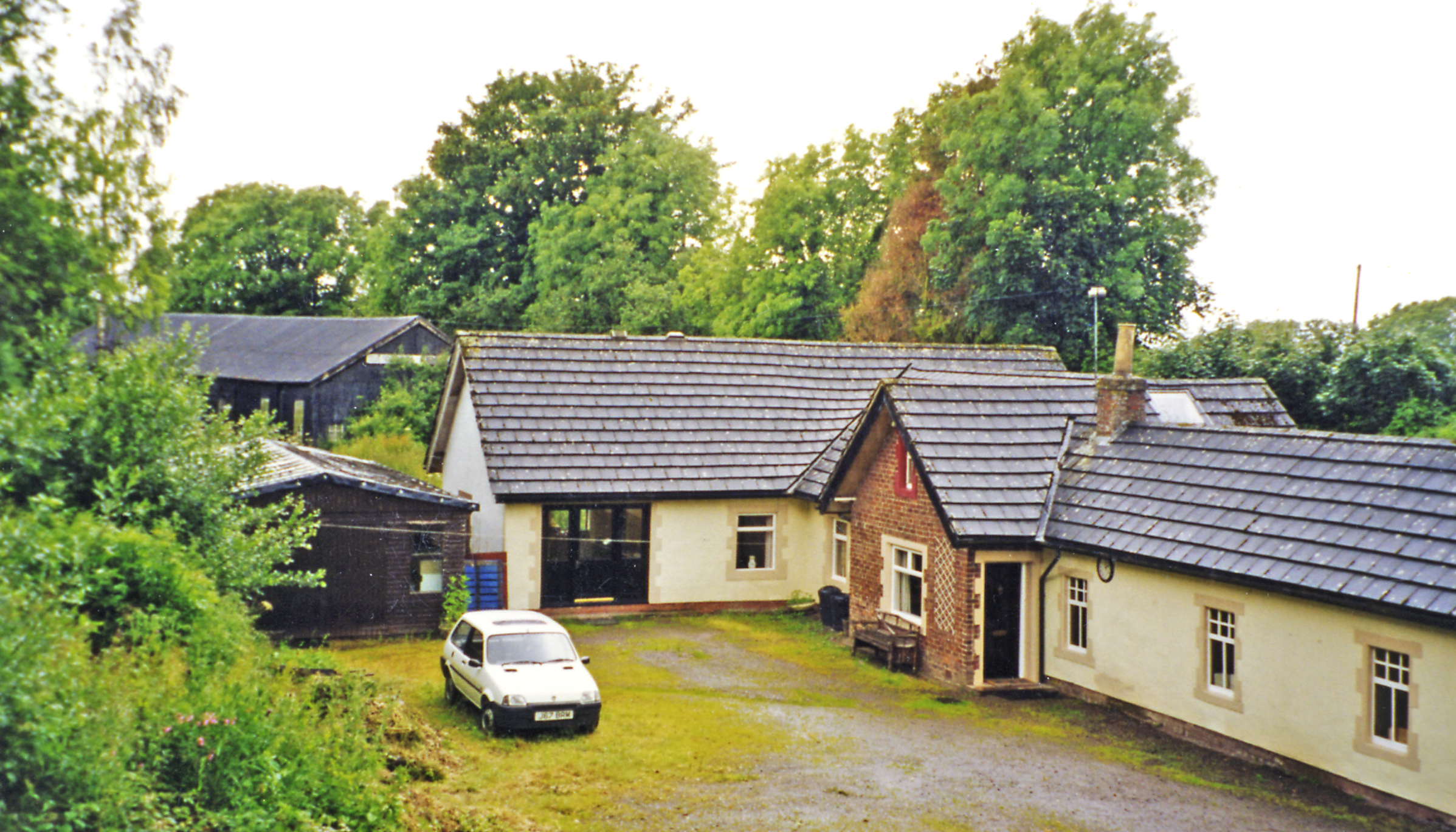
- The former station in 2002

General information
- Location: Kirkandrews-on-Eden, Cumberland; England
- Coordinates: 54.9166°N 3.0121°W
- Grid reference: NY352584
- Platforms: 1

Other information
- Status: Disused

History
- Original company: Port Carlisle Railway
- Pre-grouping: North British Railway
- Post-grouping: London and North Eastern Railway

Key dates
- 1854: Opened
- 7 September 1964: Closed
Location
- Location within Cumbria Location within the former City of Carlisle district

Kirkandrews railway station was near Kirkandrews-on-Eden, Cumberland (now Cumbria), England. It was on the Port Carlisle Railway branch, and later part of the Silloth branch. The station served the village and the rural district. Kirkandrews closed on 7 September 1964; with the line to Silloth as part of the Beeching cuts.The station building survives as a private dwelling.

== History ==
In 1819, a port was constructed at Port Carlisle and in 1821, the Carlisle Navigation Canal was built to take goods to Carlisle. The canal was closed in 1853, when the Port Carlisle Railway Company filled in part of it to construct a railway that began passenger service in 1854. However, the railway discontinued passenger service two years later, when the Carlisle & Silloth Bay Railway & Dock Company opened a new line to Silloth, using the Port Carlisle Branch as far as Drumburgh.

The North British Railway leased the line from 1862, it was absorbed by them in 1880, and then taken over by the London and North Eastern Railway in 1923.

=== Infrastructure ===
The station sat close to the village in the cut of the old canal; it had a single platform, and a shelter. The branch ran close to the course of Hadrian's Wall. A substantial station building was present. A large seed warehouse was located at the station. In common with other stations on the line, it had its name picked out in sea shells on a raised area opposite the station building.

Preceding station	Disused railways	Following station
Carlisle; Station open, line closed	North British Railway; Carlisle and Silloth Bay Railway	Burgh-by-Sands; Line and station closed
