= Port Carlisle railway station =

Disused railway station in Cumbria, England

Port Carlisle
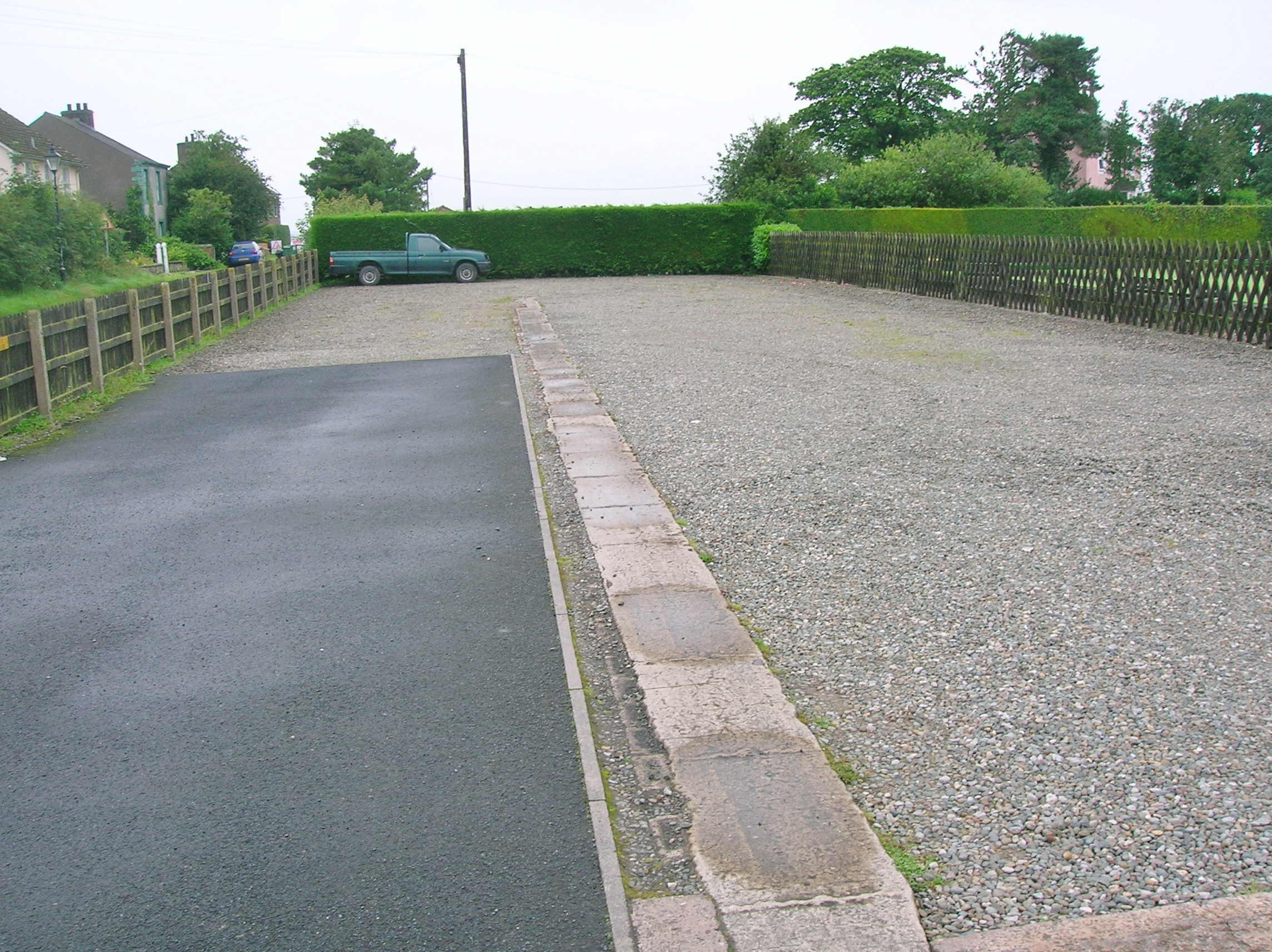
- Remnants of the old station platform

General information
- Location: Port Carlisle, Cumberland; England
- Coordinates: 54.9488°N 3.1874°W
- Grid reference: NY240622
- Platforms: 1

Other information
- Status: Disused

History
- Original company: Port Carlisle Railway
- Pre-grouping: North British Railway
- Post-grouping: London and North Eastern Railway

Key dates
- 22 June 1854: Opened
- 1 January 1917: Closed
- 1 February 1919: Reopened
- 1 June 1932: Closed
Location

Port Carlisle railway station was a railway station in Port Carlisle, Cumbria; the terminus on the Port Carlisle Railway, serving the village and old port and the steamer service to Liverpool that ran from here until 1856, when it was transferred to Silloth. Port Carlisle was two and a half miles away by train from Drumburgh and Glasson was one and a quarter miles away. The journey time to Drumburgh was nine minutes, although Glasson was a request stop.

== History ==
A port was built in 1819 at the hamlet of Fisher's Cross, later renamed Port Carlisle, and four years later, in 1821, the eleven and a half mile-long Carlisle Navigation Canal was built to take goods to Carlisle. The canal was closed in 1853 and the canal basin at Carlisle and parts of the canal were filled in by the Port Carlisle Railway Company, who constructed a railway that started passenger services commenced in 1854, discontinuing them two years later when the Carlisle & Silloth Bay Railway & Dock Company's (C&SBRDC) new railway to Silloth opened, utilising the Port Carlisle Branch as far as Drumburgh. A brief resurgence of business at Port Carlisle had taken place upon the opening of the railway, taken away however by the new port at Silloth and the transfer of the steamer service to Liverpool.

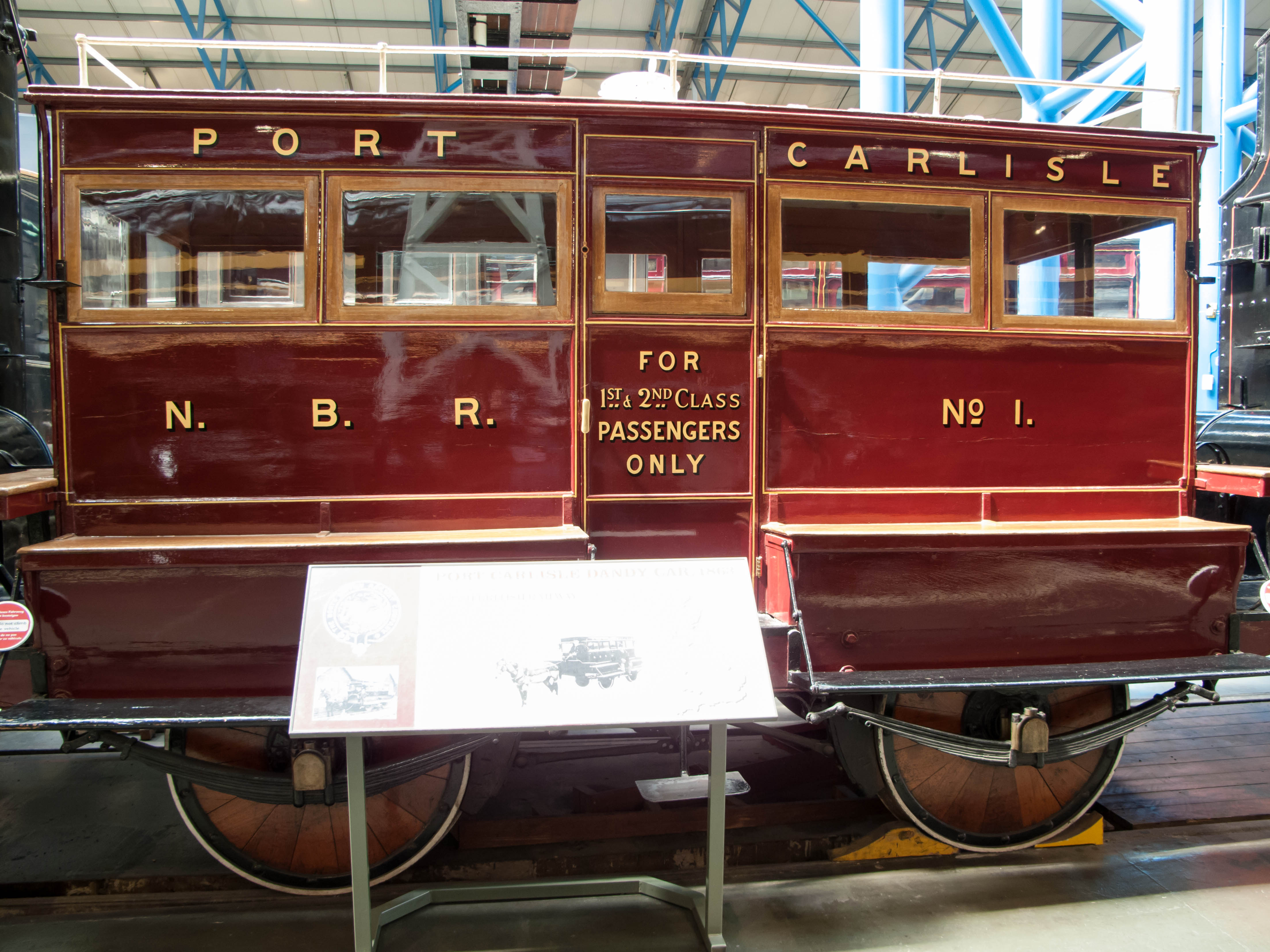
'Dandy'. one of the old horse-drawn carriages

As a cheap alternative a horse-drawn service was provided in 1856 between Drumburgh and Port Carlisle for a number of years. In 1914 steam power was used and to try to avoid closure, a steam railmotor called 'Flower of Yarrow' was built and this service to Port Carlisle railway station lasted until the branch was closed in 1932. Freight services had been withdrawn in 1899.

By altering sediment-carrying currents the construction of Solway railway viaduct of the Solway Junction Railway caused Port Carlisle harbour to silt up and lose trade, which in turn eventually resulted in the abandonment of the Port Carlisle to Carlisle railway. The large Ravenbank Jetty further up the Solway had also thrown the River Eden off towards the Scottish side and further hindered access to the port.

The Port Carlisle Railway Company had agreed to supply a locomotive if the C&SBRDC provided rolling stock. The North British Railway leased the line from 1862, it was absorbed by them in 1880, and then taken over by the London and North Eastern Railway in 1923.

On the day of closure residents gathered in a bower on the bowling green and passed a motion that "the line had been closed because of the poor and inadequate service offered to the public."

=== Infrastructure ===
The station had a substantial station house and a single platform intersected by a road crossing. A spur with sidings ran down towards the old canal jetty basin, a longer siding ran down to a second jetty and a turntable was located near the tumulus.

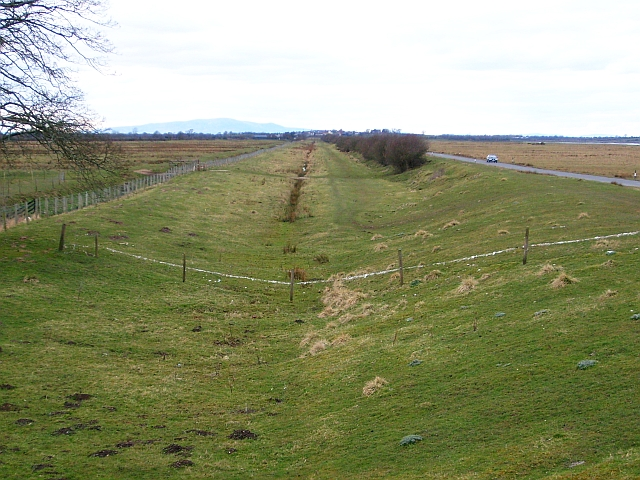
The line of the old railway and canal near Port Carlisle.

At Canal Junction the Port Carlisle line made an end on junction with the earlier goods branch from London Road and it was this section on to Drumburgh (pronounced drum-bruff) that was taken over by the Carlisle & Silloth Bay Railway & Dock Company. Immediately west of Drumburgh station the line branched off from the line to Silloth, passing under a minor road to Port Carlisle. The branch ran close to the south bank of the Solway Firth and the course of Hadrians Wall heading over low ground to the terminus of the line at Port Carlisle.

== Micro-history ==
The Brampton to Brampton Junction line was also worked by a horse-drawn carriage from circa 1838 to 1881 and was known as the 'dandy' line.

Until the 1980s the station platform was fully intact and open to view; it has since been partly infilled to form a car park.

The railway leading to Port Carlisle lay close to the course of Hadrians Wall for much of its course.

Four horse-drawn 'Dandy cars' built by the North British Railway. The Dandy car was originally preserved at Carlisle, before being moved to the National Railway Museum at York. Port Carlisle became a day tourist attraction to Carlisle Victorians. Isaac Hickson was the driver of the horse-drawn train, and he became the guard on the steam powered train that entered service on 6 April 1914.

The 'Flower of Yarrow' Sentinel Railcar used on the line was driven by James Grey with T. Jackson as the fireman worked on the Port Carlisle Railway in 1932, before its final closure.

Preceding station	Disused railways	Following station
Glasson; Line and station closed	Port Carlisle Railway Company	Terminus
