= Drumburgh Castle =

Castle in Cumbria, England

- Cumbria, England
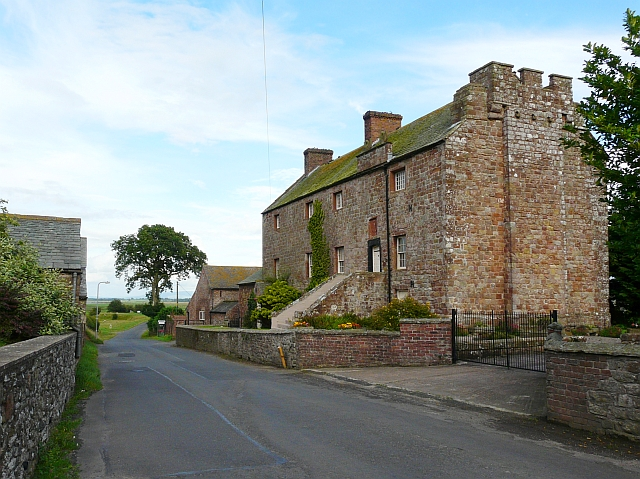
- Drumburgh Castle today

Site information
- Type: Pele tower

Location
- Location in Allerdale, Cumbria Location in Cumbria, England
- Coordinates: 54.9266°N 3.1484°W
- Grid reference: grid reference NY265597

Site history
- Materials: Red sandstone

Drumburgh Castle is a Grade I-listed medieval pele tower in the village of Drumburgh, in Cumbria, England.

== History ==
A pele tower was originally built on this site, near the village of Burgh, by Robert le Brun in 1307, on the site of a former tower that had been part of Hadrian's Wall. The construction used red sandstone masonry from the wall for its construction. Thomas Dacre rebuilt the castle in 1518, producing what contemporaries described as "neither castle nor tower but a house of strength". The house was altered again between 1678 and 1681 by John Alglionby, producing the current design. The property today has a distinctive first floor doorway and staircase - a later addition to the castle - decorated with the Dacre coat of arms, and has parts of a Roman shrine incorporated into its stonework.

== See also ==
- Grade I listed buildings in Cumbria
- Listed buildings in Bowness
- Castles in Great Britain and Ireland
- List of castles in England

== Bibliography ==
- Pettifer, Adrian. (2002) English Castles: a Guide by Counties. Woodbridge, UK: Boydell Press. ISBN 978-0-85115-782-5.
- Richards, Mark and Roger Clegg. (2008) The Spirit of Hadrian's Wall. Cicerone Press. ISBN 978-1-85284-558-2.
