= Drumburgh =

Settlement in Cumbria, England

Coordinates: 54.92°N 03.15°W

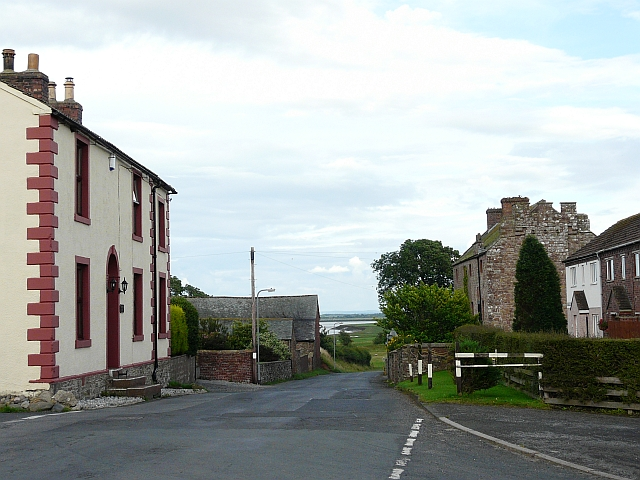
- Drumburgh village, looking east

- Location in Allerdale, Cumbria Location within Cumbria
- OS grid reference: NY2659
- Civil parish: Bowness
- Unitary authority: Cumberland
- Ceremonial county: Cumbria
- Region: North West
- Country: England
- Sovereign state: United Kingdom
- Post town: WIGTON
- Postcode district: CA7
- Dialling code: 01697
- Police: Cumbria
- Fire: Cumbria
- Ambulance: North West
- UK Parliament: Penrith and Solway

Drumburgh (/ˈdrʌmˌbrʌf/ DRUM-bruff) is a small settlement in Cumbria, England. It is 13 kilometres (8 mi) northwest of the city of Carlisle and is on the course of Hadrian's Wall, near to Burgh by Sands. The village is sited on a gentle hill with a good view in all directions over the surrounding lowlands.

== History ==
The name means 'ridge near the fort' as derived from the Celtic language and the common Old English word 'burgh', pronounced as 'bruff' in this instance. Coggabata is the Roman fort referred to in the placename, which was linked by a Roman road to the nearby fort at Kirkbride to the southwest. The fort was located opposite a ford over the Solway Firth, and the site has been both partially overlain by modern housing and additionally it has been damaged by a substantial medieval ditch. John Leland visited in 1539 and reported that the Wall had been heavily robbed to provide for buildings in Drumburgh, such as the castle. The village lies in the old Barony of Burgh, dating from 1092, the baron now being the Earl of Lonsdale. The barony was a bulwark against Scottish invasion across the Solway In 1870-72 the township had a population of 421.

=== Drumburgh Castle ===
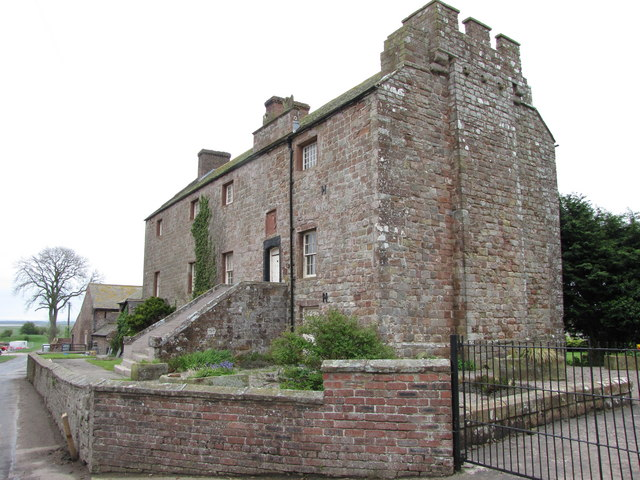
Drumburgh Castle

In the 14th century a pele tower house known as Drumburgh Castle was built here by Thomas, Lord Dacre, whose coat of arms are placed over an entrance at second-floor level. Licence to crenellate the preceding tower had been granted in 1307 to Robert le Brun. It passed by marriage in the 15th century to Jacob Harington, but by 1480 it was ruinous. It again needed urgent repairs in 1580 and by 1593 it was simply a fortified farmhouse, occupied by a bailiff, with a datestone over the upper doorway that was inscribed 1518.

In 1646 Cuthbert Orfeur, a tenant of the Earl of Arundel, complained that he had been forcibly removed from the old castle by Lord Dacre's agent. In 1678 the Duke of Norfolk sold the building to John Aglionby and by 1696 Sir John Lowther was the owner and during his time alteration works were carried out. After a long period of neglect it was fully restored as a private dwelling in the 1970s. It has extremely thick walls built with stones taken from Hadrian's Wall.

== Transport ==
=== Canals ===
The Carlisle Navigation Canal (1821–1853) ran in a straight cut from Burgh by Sands to Drumburgh before turning east to avoid Drumbugh Hill and reaching the Solway at Port Carlisle. The Port Carlisle Railway Company filled in the canal and rail passenger services commenced in 1854.

=== Railways ===
Drumburgh railway station, on the Port Carlisle Railway, was a junction for Port Carlisle on the old branch line to Silloth. It had an island platform and a signal box. A horse-drawn passenger service was provided between Drumburgh and Port Carlisle from 1856, replaced in 1914 by steam propulsion until a steam railmotor 'Flower of Yarrow' was introduced, running until the branch closed in 1932.

== Natural history ==
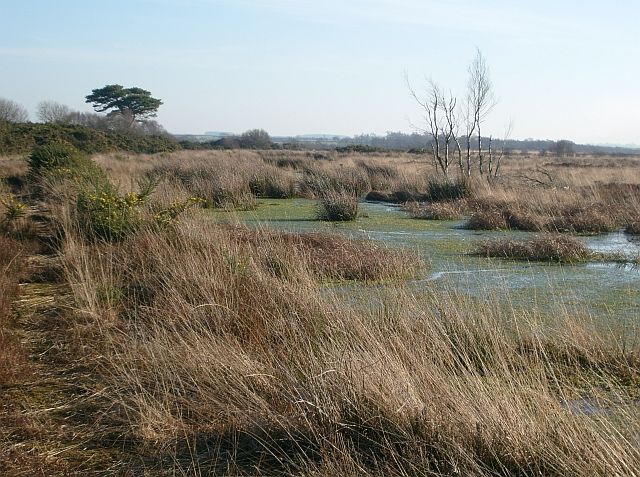
Drumburgh Moss

The nature reserve of Drumburgh Moss (NGR NY 255 586 ) is a peat bog located immediately south of the village, purchased by the Cumbria Wildlife Trust in 1981; various extensions have been purchased since then. It is a Site of Special Scientific Interest (SSSI), a National Nature Reserve (NNR), and a Special Area of Conservation (SAC).

== Micro-history ==
In 1821 Thomas Clark, a blacksmith from Drumburgh, was arrested on a charge of stabbing a labourer on the new canal.

== See also ==
- Listed buildings in Bowness
