= Bowness-on-Solway =

Village in Cumbria, England

Coordinates: 54.950°N 3.216°W

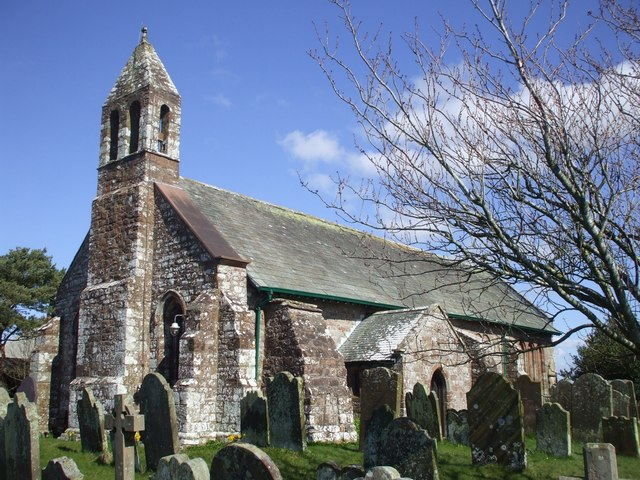
- St. Michael's Church, Bowness-on-Solway

- Location in Allerdale, Cumbria Location within Cumbria
- Population: 1,126 (2011)
- OS grid reference: NY220623
- Civil parish: Bowness
- Unitary authority: Cumberland
- Ceremonial county: Cumbria
- Region: North West
- Country: England
- Sovereign state: United Kingdom
- Post town: WIGTON
- Postcode district: CA7
- Dialling code: 01697
- Police: Cumbria
- Fire: Cumbria
- Ambulance: North West
- UK Parliament: Penrith and Solway

Bowness-on-Solway is a picturesque costal village in Cumbria, England, and in the historic county of Cumberland. It is situated to the west of Carlisle on the southern side of the Solway Firth estuary separating England and Scotland. The civil parish had a population of 1,126 at the 2011 census. The western end of Hadrian's Wall is a notable tourist destination, though the Wall itself is no longer to be seen here above ground. The west end start/ finish point of the Hadrian's Wall Path - an 84 mile (135 Km) long National Trail stretching coast to coast across northern England - is marked by a pavilion on the small coastal cliff at Bowness. The village is part of the Solway Coast Area of Outstanding Natural Beauty.

== Toponymy ==
'Bowness' means 'rounded', or 'bow-shaped headland', from either the Old English 'boga', 'bow', and 'næss', or, more probably, the Old Norse 'bogi' and 'nes'.

== Roman era ==
The village is situated on the site of the Roman fort called Maia, and was the last (or first) fort at the western end of the Wall - overlooking the Solway Firth.The fort is believed to have measured 710 feet (220 m) by 420 feet (130 m), covering about 7 acres (28,000 m^{2}) the second largest on Hadrian's Wall. There was also a notable civilian settlement (vicus) outside the south gate of the fort.

== Governance ==
Bowness-on-Solway is part of the parliamentary constituency of Penrith and Solway.

For Local Government purposes it is in the Cumberland unitary authority area.

== St Michael's Church ==
The Norman church sits atop what may have been the granary for the Roman fort (Maia) in the 12th century. The two original bells were stolen by border raiders in 1626, accidentally dropping them in the Solway during their flight. In retaliation, the villagers raided Dornock and Middlebie in Scotland, making off with a new pair of bells. Traditionally, on inception, the vicar of Annan petitions the village's neighbours for the return of his bells.

== Solway Viaduct ==
In 1869, the Solway Junction Railway was opened, connecting the Maryport and Carlisle Railway to the Scottish railway system more directly than the existing route through Carlisle, by a 1.1 mile (2.161 km) iron girder viaduct (the remains of which can still be seen) across the Solway between Bowness-on-Solway and Annan in Scotland. The construction of the viaduct prevented ships entering the upper Solway and hence destroyed the trade of Port Carlisle, which had already been largely supplanted by the construction of a wet dock at Silloth. The viaduct suffered minor frost damage in 1875; in 1881 large sections of it were destroyed by ice floes, but the viaduct was rebuilt. The railway never lived up to its promoters' expectations, and in 1914 it was restricted to carrying goods only. In 1921 the railway was closed entirely, and in 1934 the viaduct was demolished.

== Gallery ==
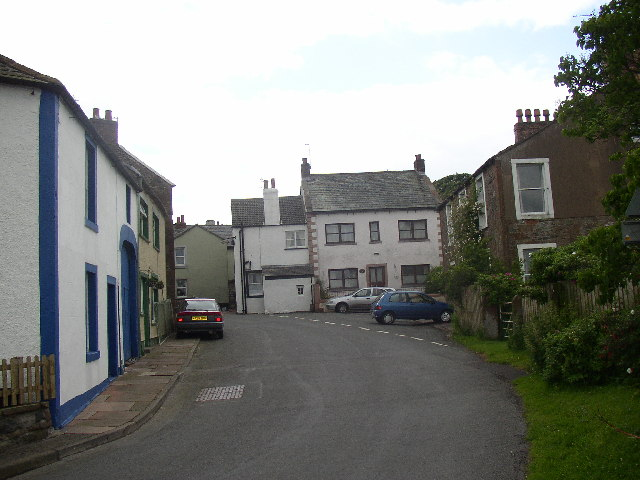
Bowness main street

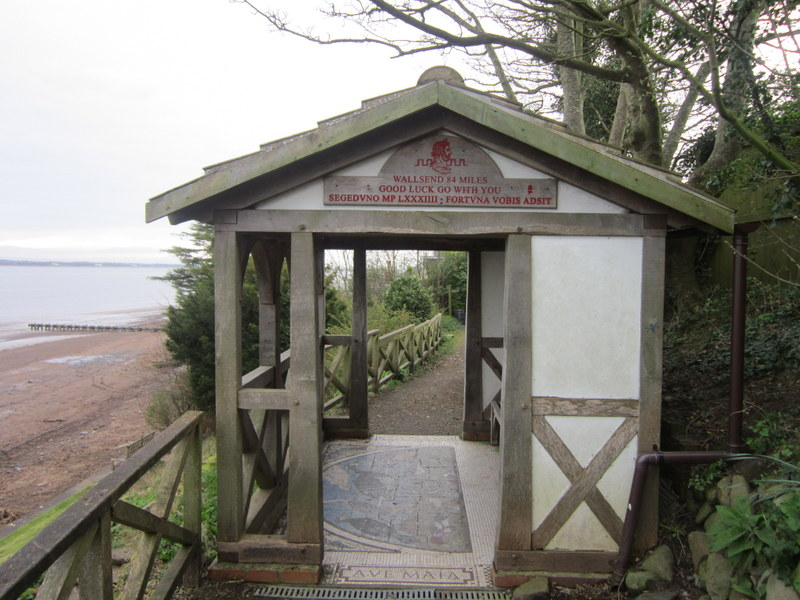
Pavilion at the west end of the Hadrian's Wall Path

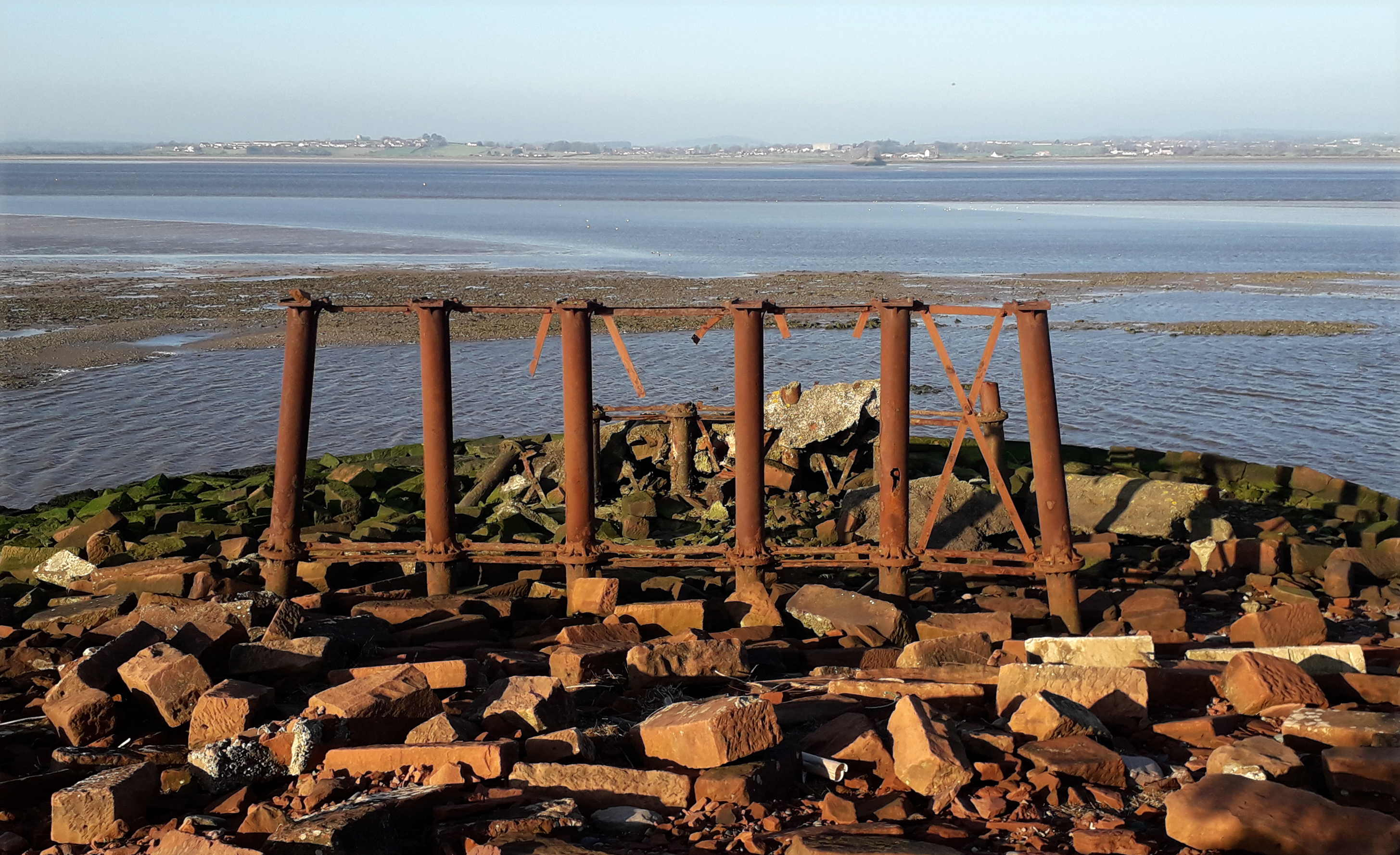
Remains of Solway viaduct - English side 2018

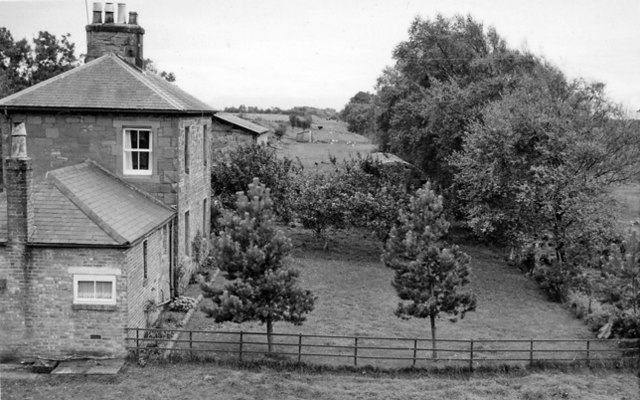
The station building in 1961

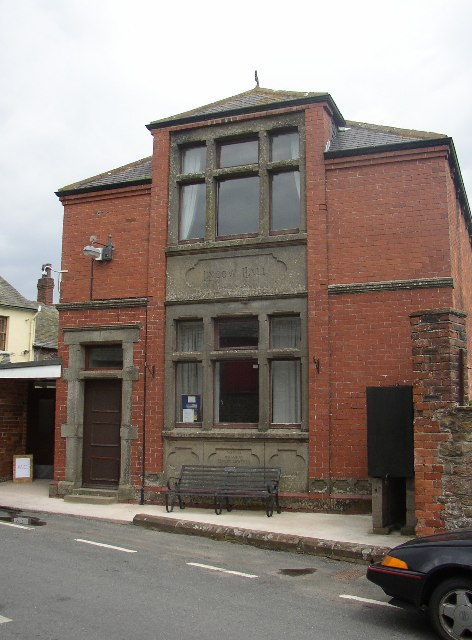
Lindow Hall, Bowness

== See also ==
- Listed buildings in Bowness
- Hadrian's Wall Path
