= Port Carlisle =

Village in Cumbria, England

Coordinates: 54.948°N 3.186°W

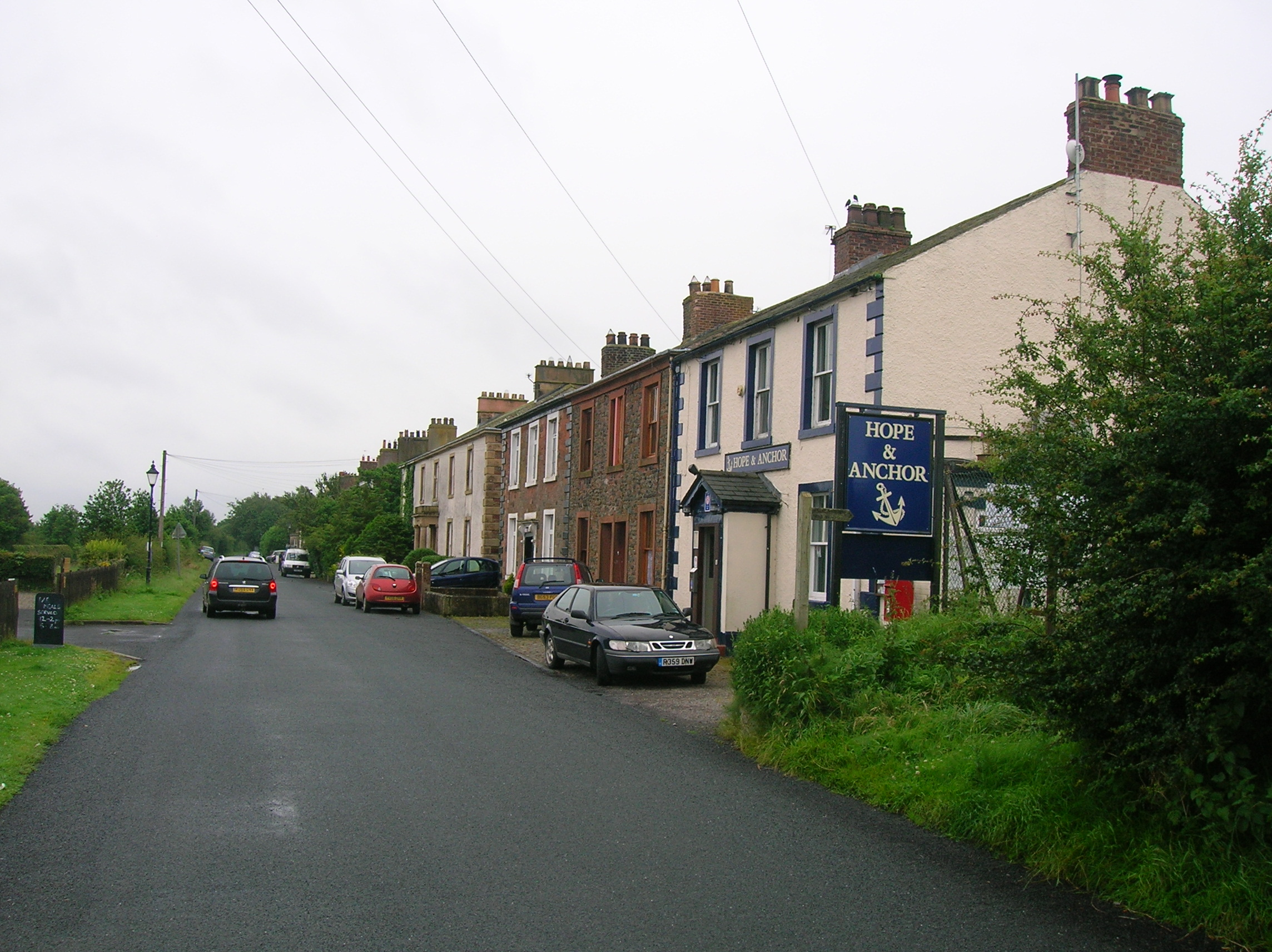
- Port Carlisle's main street

- Location in Allerdale, Cumbria Location within Cumbria
- OS grid reference: NY241622
- Civil parish: Bowness
- Unitary authority: Cumberland
- Ceremonial county: Cumbria
- Region: North West
- Country: England
- Sovereign state: United Kingdom
- Post town: WIGTON
- Postcode district: CA7
- Dialling code: 016973
- Police: Cumbria
- Fire: Cumbria
- Ambulance: North West
- UK Parliament: Penrith and Solway

Port Carlisle is a coastal village in Cumberland, Cumbria, England. It is in the civil parish of Bowness-on-Solway. Its original name was Fisher's Cross, but when it became the terminus of the Carlisle Canal it was renamed Port Carlisle. During the lifetime of the canal it was of considerable importance as the sea outlet for Carlisle, handling both freight and passengers. With the building of the much bigger Silloth docks, the canal was redundant. Some through trade continued via the Port Carlisle Railway, but diminished as the Solway silted up.

== The canal and railway ==
The Carlisle canal was built to allow sea access for Carlisle to Ireland, Scotland and Liverpool. The sea terminus was at Port Carlisle, and a sea lock and basin was built there in 1819. Four years later the canal was completed to Carlisle, and Port Carlisle became the centre of a good deal of transhipment trade, and passenger traffic via steam packets. However, the canal was short-lived due to competition from deep-water ports and the railways, and it closed in 1853. The canal was filled in and was used to lay the track for the Port Carlisle Railway which opened in 1854. The offshore wharf was connected to the rail system to allow continued access to Carlisle.

The direct passenger service to Carlisle ceased two years later when the railway to Silloth opened and a horse-drawn tram, the "Dandy", was substituted to join the Silloth line at Drumburgh. Freight still travelled on the railway from Port Carlisle, but decreased as the channel silted, and the much better dock facilities at Silloth were used. In 1914 to prevent closure of the line, a steam railmotor called 'Flower of Yarrow' was introduced and this service lasted until the branch was closed in 1932. The village was served by the Port Carlisle railway station.

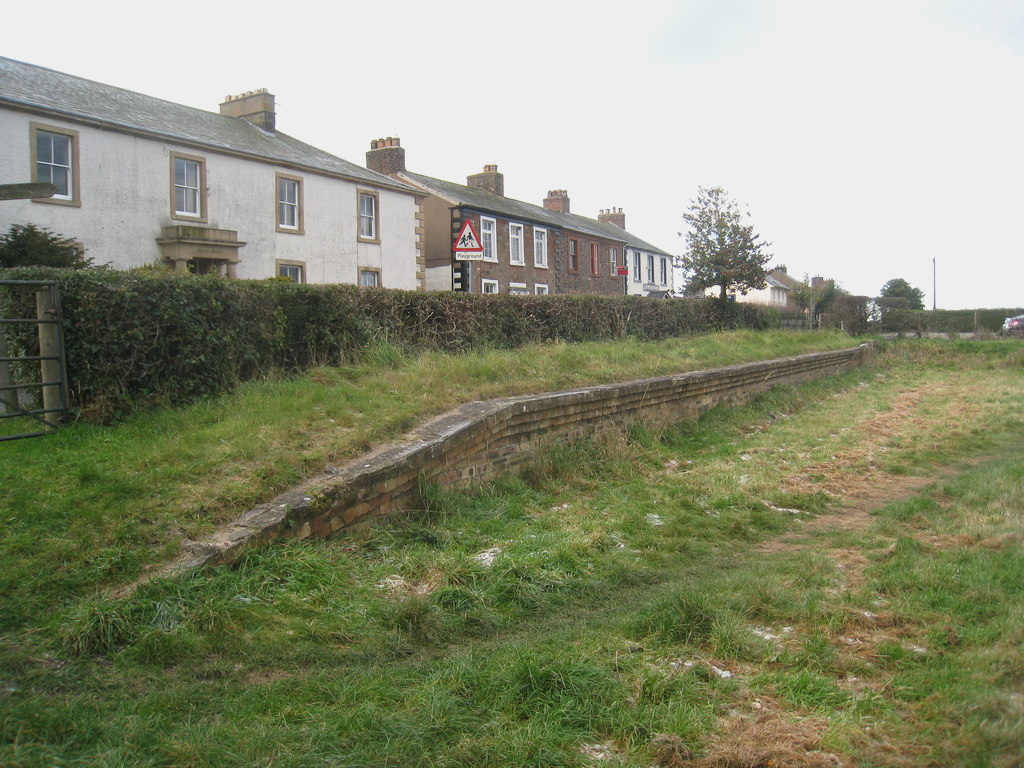
Remains of Railway station in 2010, now a car park.

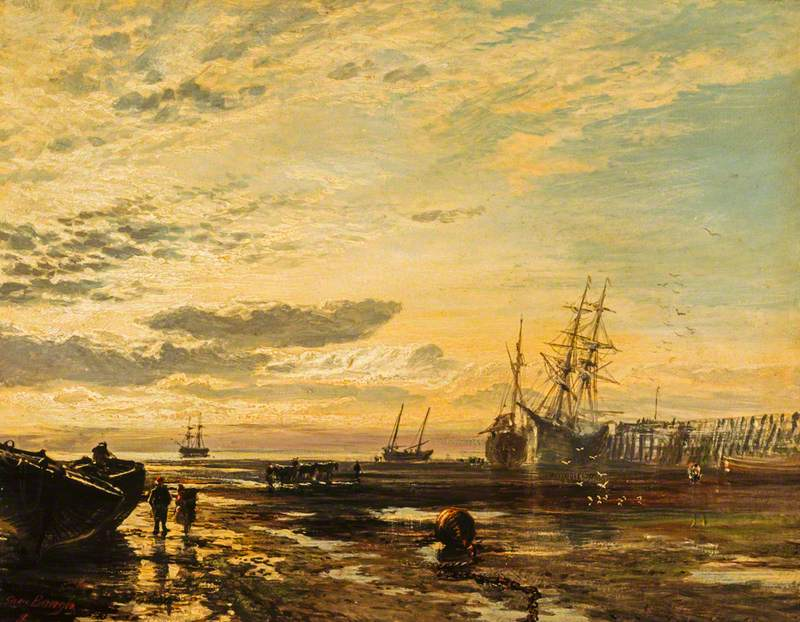
Samuel Bough (1822–1878) – The Solway at Port Carlisle

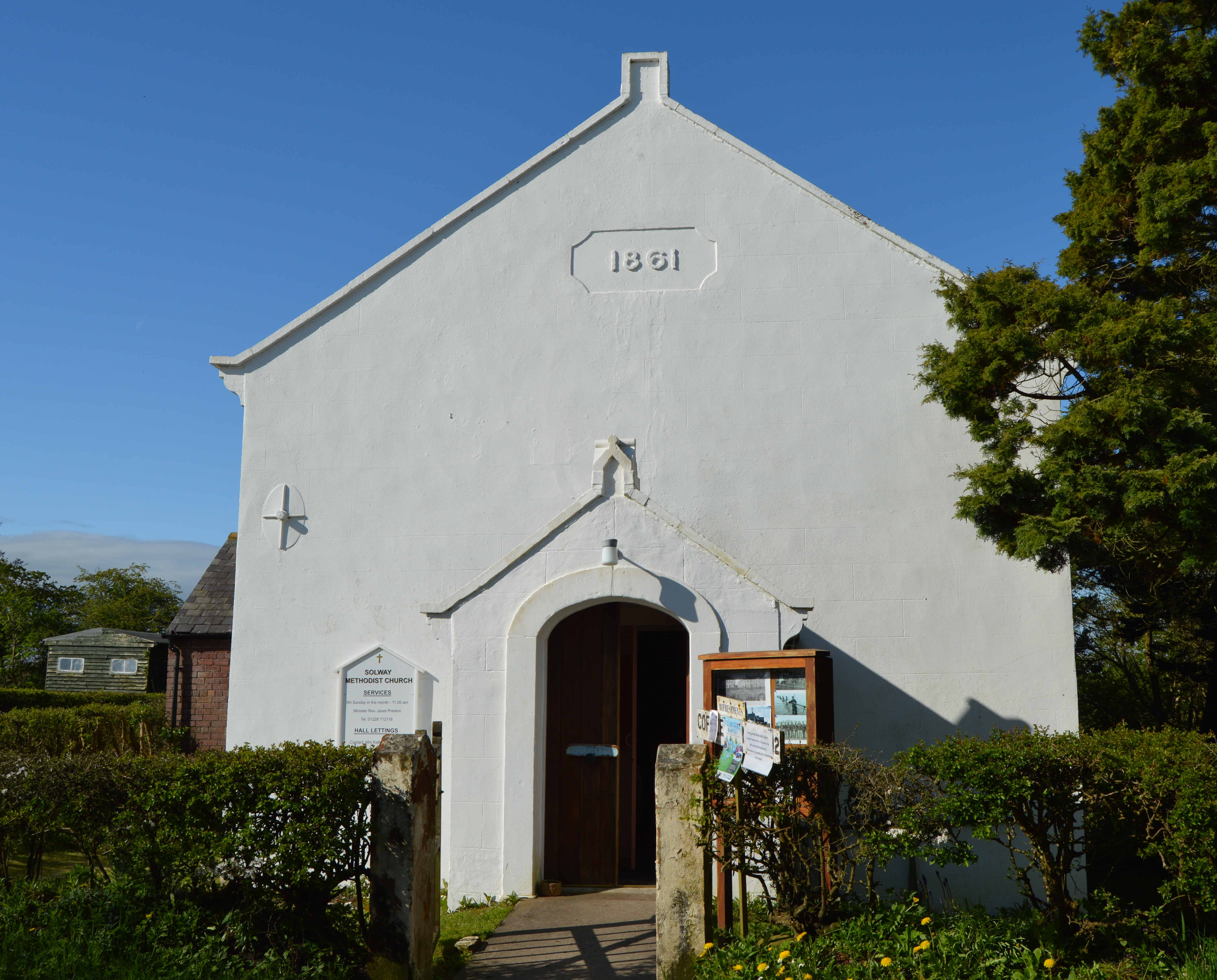
Port Carlisle Methodist chapel

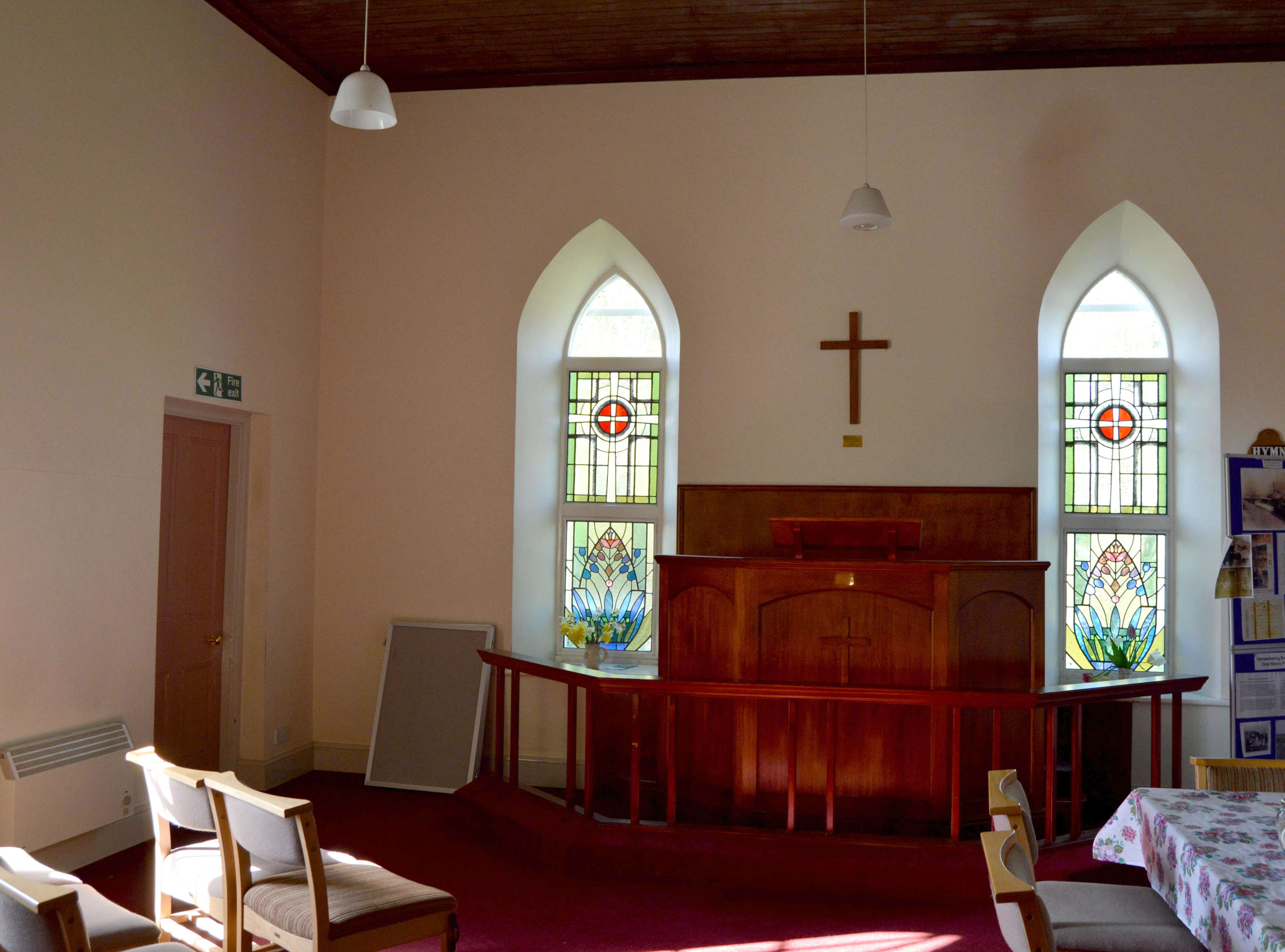
Interior of the chapel

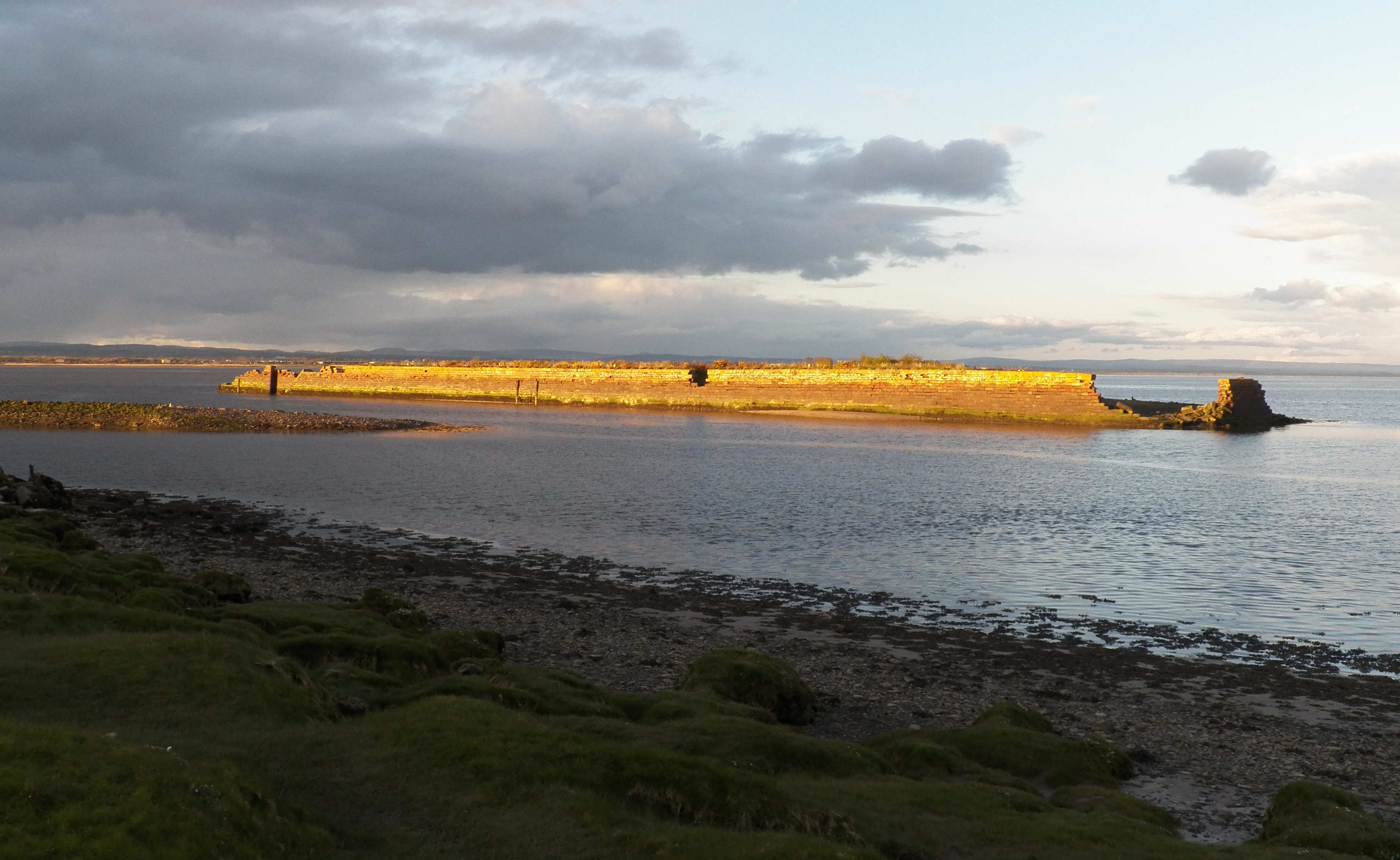
The offshore wharf built 1836 to accommodate larger vessels that could not enter the canal basin.

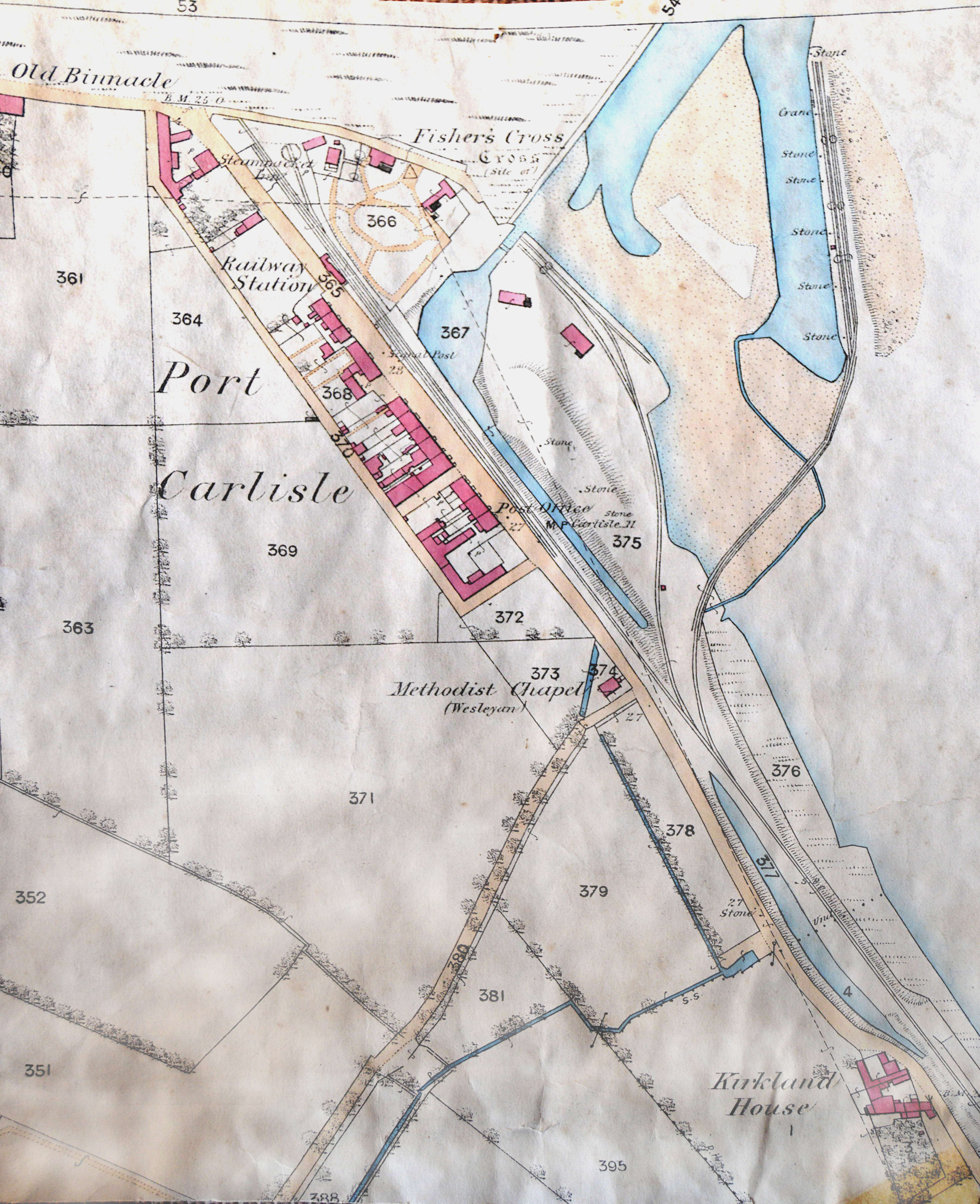
Map of Port Carlisle showing remains of canal basin, and the railway.

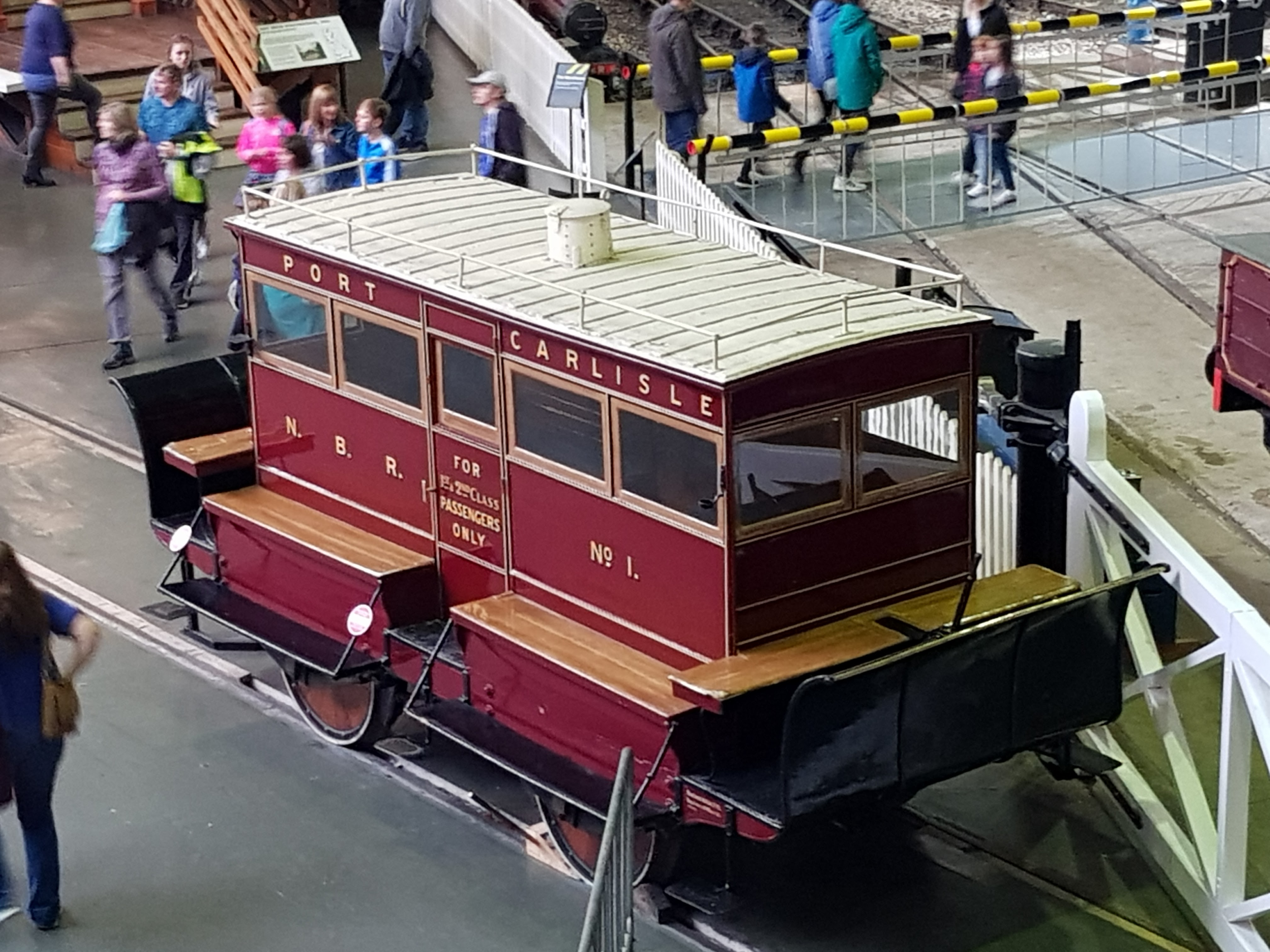
The Port Carlisle horse-drawn tram; the "Dandy" in the National Railway Museum.

== See also ==
- List of places in Cumbria
- Listed buildings in Bowness
