= Pike Hill Signal Tower =

Historic site in Cumbria, England

- Cumbria, England, UK
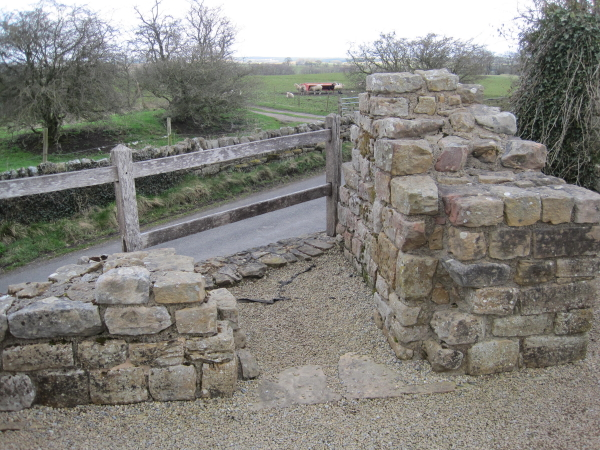
- The remains of Pike Hill Signal Tower

Location
- Location in Cumbria
- Coordinates: 54.975955°N 2.662937°W
- Grid reference: NY57666479

Pike Hill Signal Tower was one of a number of signal stations that were built on high ground overlooking the line of the Roman Stanegate road in northern Britannia during the early 2nd century. It later became incorporated into Hadrian's Wall. Its remains, a 2-metre (6 ft 7 in) long fragment of the south-east wall, lie south of a modern road cutting and field wall, located in the parish of Waterhead in Cumberland, United Kingdom. The tower is located between Turret 51B and Turret 52A with the fort of Banna located to the east.

== History ==
A signalling tower was built on Pike Hill during the Stanegate phase of fortifying the northern frontier of the Roman province of Britannia. Signalling towers and a number of forts were built along the line of the Roman road that connected significant military forts at Corbridge and Carlisle. This followed the withdrawal of the Roman army from Scotland around 100 and was prior to the construction of Hadrian's Wall which started in 125. The station at Pike Hill signalled to two nearby stations, Gillalees Beacon and Barrock Fell.

As Hadrian's Wall was extended through the area, the signal tower came to be incorporated alongside the newly constructed wall. The tower's location put it about 200 metres (660 ft) east of Turret 52A (Banks East) and west of Turret 51B (Leahill Turret).

It has been suggested that the signal tower was manned by part of Milecastle 52's garrison. The extra size of Milecastle 52 (20% larger than any other milecastle) has been cited as evidence for this.

== Construction ==
Archaeological investigations have shown that the tower was built prior to either the turf or stone walls that exist nearby. The tower was offset from the wall and stood at an angle of 45° to the line of the wall. The purpose of this was to improve the visibility of the signal. A ditch lies to the north of the tower, following the same course as the tower resulting in a zig-zag line.

The signal tower was a square structure measuring around 6 metres (20 ft) on each side. The tower was built on a platform of mortared rubble and deep foundations have been found which indicate an upper structure of some extra height. The masonry was finished to a higher standard than the turrets found on the wall.

== Excavations and investigations ==
- 1931 - The remains were excavated and consolidated. Finds included:
  - Pottery dating to the Hadrianic period;
  - Rims of cooking pots known as Huntcliff ware, indicating occupation as late as the latter half of the 4th century.
- 1971 - English Heritage Field Investigation. It was noted that the modern road cutting has led to the destruction of the majority of the structure, only a fragment of the south-east wall remaining visible.

== Monument records ==
Monument	Monument Number	English Heritage Archive Number
Pike Hill Signal Tower	12700	NY 56 SE 18
