= Milecastle 53 =

Milecastle on Hadrian's Wall in Cumbria, England

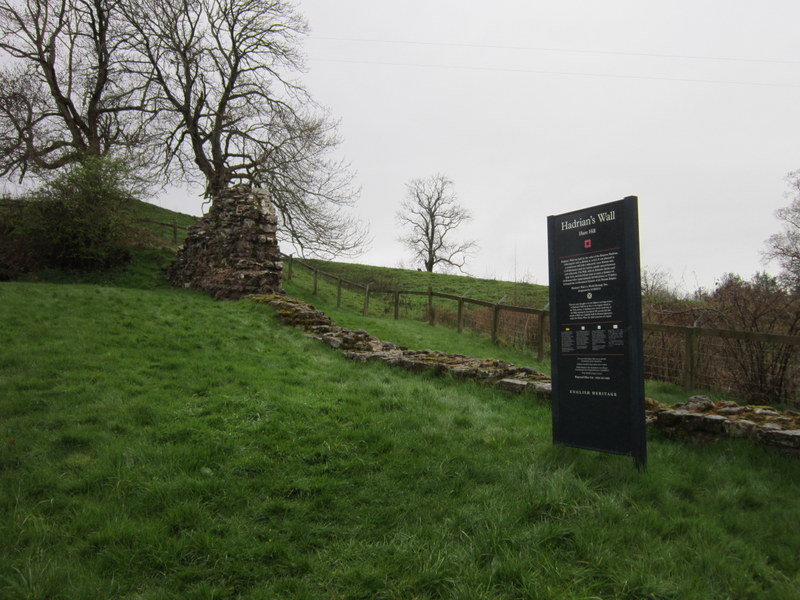
- Hadrian's Wall at Hare Hill, just west of the site of Milecastle 53

- Location within Cumbria
- 54.974146°N 2.681336°W
- Type: Milecastle
- Location: Cumbria, England

Milecastle 53 (Banks Burn) was a milecastle on Hadrian's Wall (grid reference NY56486460).

== Description ==
Milecastle 53 is west of the hamlet of Banks, Cumbria and northeast of Lanercost Priory. It lies 1520 metres west of Milecastle 52 and 1436 metres east of Milecastle 54. There is no trace of the milecastle visible.

The tall section of Hadrian's Wall at Hare Hill (standing to a height of about 2.7 metres) is just 80 metres west of Milecastle 53 (grid reference NY56406462).

== Excavations ==
Milecastle 53 was excavated in 1932. It measured 21.9 metres east to west by 23.3 metres north to south. It had Type III gateways.

The excavation found that most of the milecastle had been robbed of masonry and the original floor had been removed so that no internal buildings remained. Some remnants of the earlier Turf Wall milecastle remained in the northeast corner and south section.

== Associated turrets ==
Each milecastle on Hadrian's Wall had two associated turret structures. These turrets were positioned approximately one-third and two-thirds of a Roman mile to the west of the Milecastle, and would probably have been manned by part of the milecastle's garrison. The turrets associated with Milecastle 53 are known as Turret 53A and Turret 53B.

=== Turret 53A ===
Turret 53A (Hare Hill) (grid reference NY56126461) survives as a slight earthwork platform. The turret was found in 1854 or 1855, and excavated in 1932. The interior was found to be full of ashes.

=== Turret 53B ===
Turret 53B (Craggle Hill) (grid reference NY55536453) also survives as a slight earthwork platform. It was excavated in 1932. The turret was the most easterly structure in Hadrian's Wall to use red sandstone.
