= Leahill Turret, Hadrian's Wall =

Part of Hadrian's Wall

- Banks, Cumbria, England
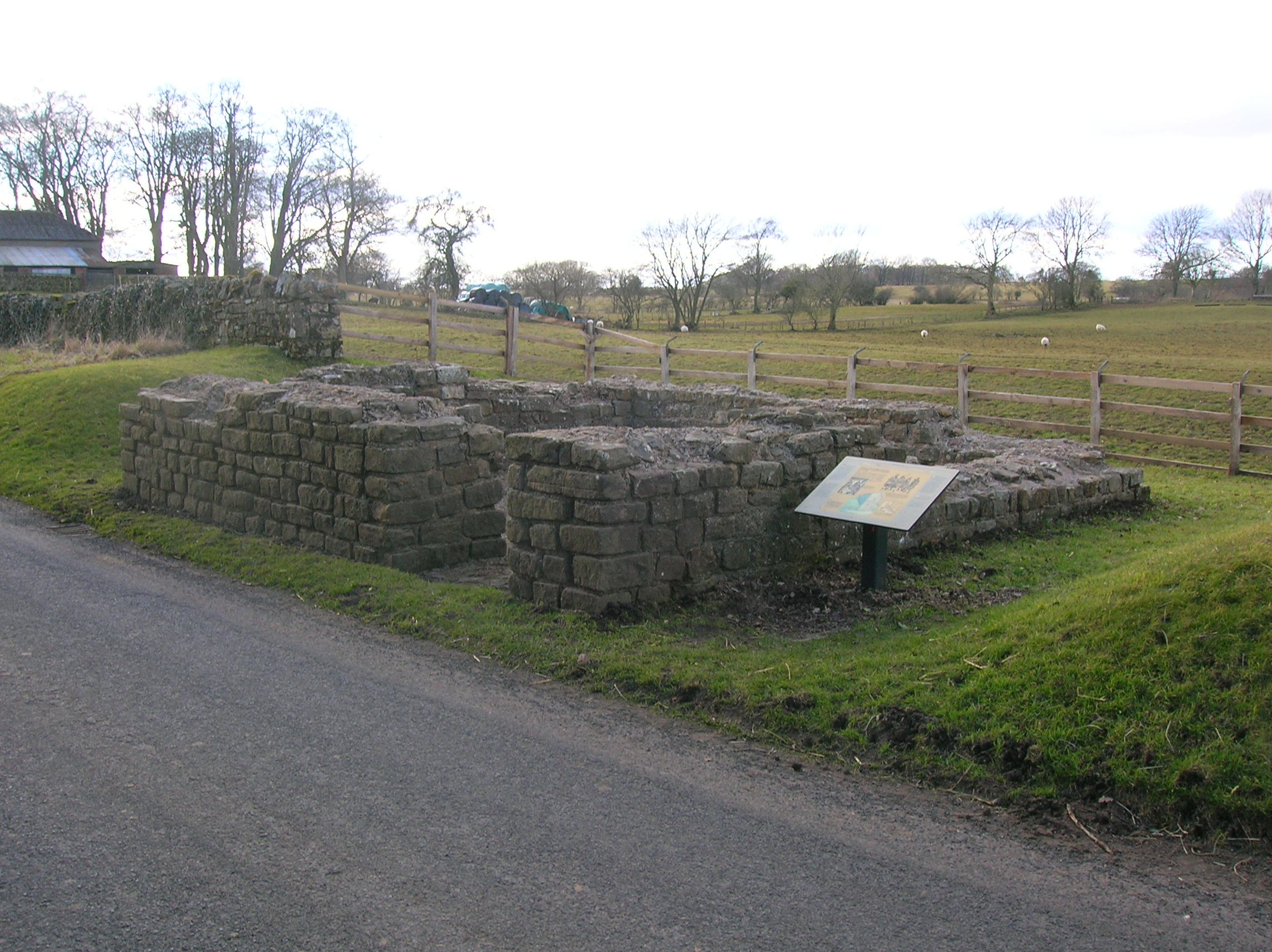
- Leahill Turret looking north-west

Site information
- Owner: English Heritage
- Open to the public: Yes
- Condition: Excavated and consolidated

Location
- Coordinates: 54.978918°N 2.651793°W
- Grid reference: NY 5838 6512
- Height: 1 metre

Site history
- Built: Circa 122 AD
- In use: 2nd and 4th century
- Materials: Stone

Leahill Turret is a typical example of one of the lookout towers located between the milecastles on Hadrian's Wall in Cumbria, located on the Lanercost Road near Banks, Parish of Waterhead. It is designated turret 51b and lies east of the Signal Tower at Pike Hill.

== Location ==
Leahill Turret lies on the lower slope of Allieshaw Rigg; Milecastle 52, Bankshead, is 540 yards to the West, Turret 51A, Piper Syke, lying 540 yards to the East and Milecastle 51, Bowers Wall 540 yards to the East of it.

== History ==
Leahill 51b was built shortly after AD 122 as part of Hadrian's Wall, dismantled under the Emperor Septimius Severus, and casually re-occupied late in the 4th century. Such lookout towers were only occupied on a temporary basis by soldiers who were patrolling the wall.

This turret was until 1927 buried beneath the road, when excavations led to its discovery and also the discovery of the precise location of the turf wall that preceded the later stone structure. The new road formation was created behind the turrets and the wall. In 1958 Leahill turret was fully excavated prior to its consolidation.

This Roman turret was a detached structure abutting the Wall, with internal measurements 13 feet 8 inches North-South by 14 feet 6 inches East-West. The slight remains of the original turf wall to the East and West had been overlain by occupation materials. Leahill had been much robbed surviving only to a maximum height of 9 courses or approximately one metre height; a platform was found in the centre of the North wall and in the 4th century a shelter was built internally against the South wall. Several occupation layers were located prior to a stone flag floor being laid.

A small cottage, still occupied in living memory, once stood close by on the opposite side of the existing road, and robbing also took place to supply material for the drystone dyking and the farm of Leahill.

The Roman ditch in front of the Wall is clearly defined in this area, except at Leahill Farm; as is the Vallum.

== Micro-history ==
The road running past Leahill is followed by both the Hadrian's Wall Path National Trail and Hadrian's Cycleway.

Metal detectorists have found a number of Roman coins in the area and a skeleton was uncovered during the 1958 excavations at Leahill Turret.

=== Illuminating Hadrian's Wall ===
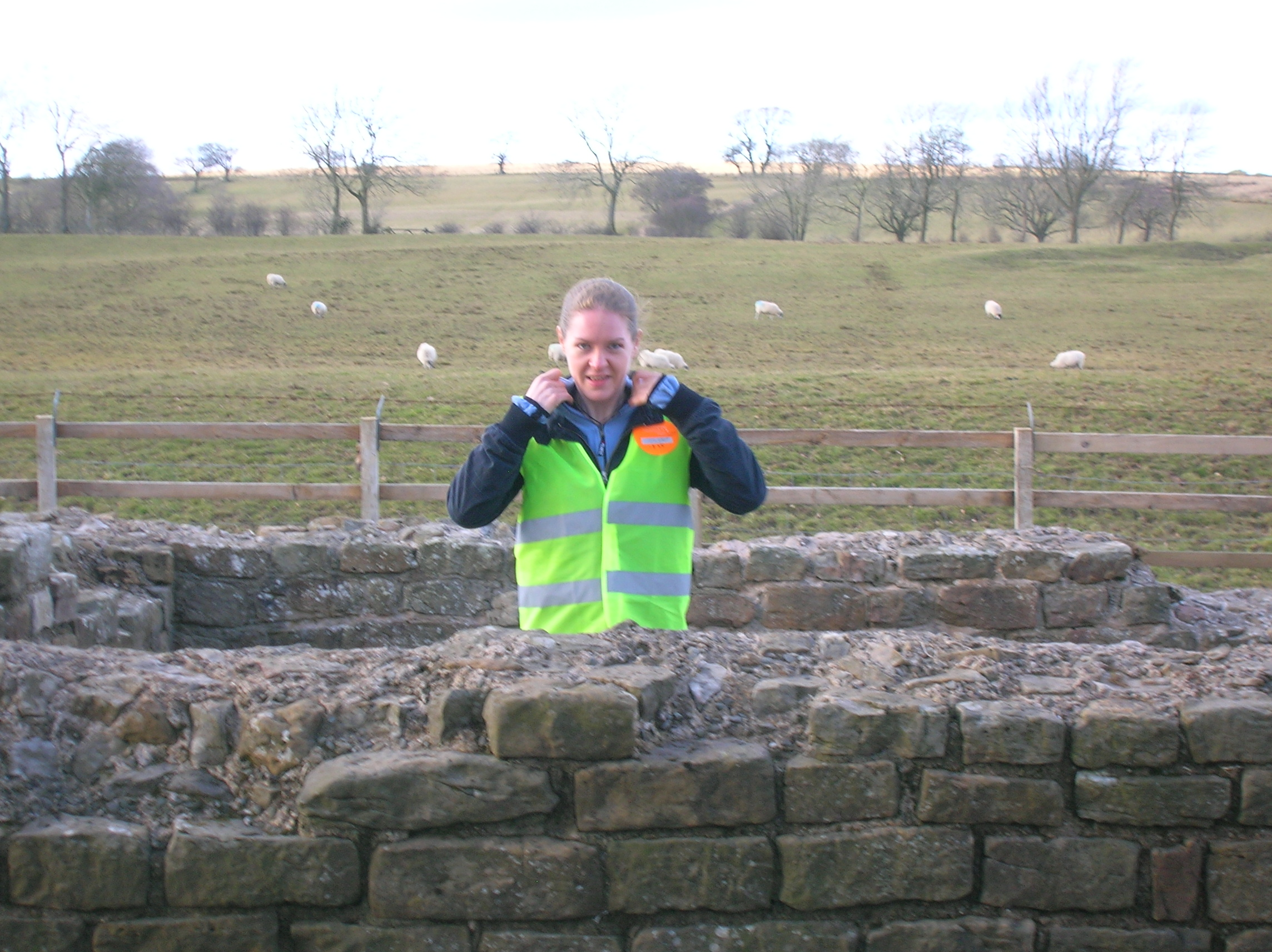
A volunteer stationed at Leahill Turret 51B, one of Cell 27 of the event volunteer 'legions'.

On 13 March 2010, all 84 miles of Hadrian's Wall was illuminated from Tyneside to Cumbria with points of light. The route was lit by 500 gas beacons, flares and torches at 250m intervals, with the assistance of over 1000 volunteers.

Leahill Turret was part of this event, garrisoned by two volunteers, marking the 1600th anniversary of the cessation of Roman rule in Britain in AD410. The 500 points of light were filmed by a helicopter at dusk.

== Turrets ==
These structures were built to a standard pattern, two storeys high with the ground floor used for cooking with a movable ladder. The upper storey probably had sleeping accommodation for two soldiers, whilst the other two were on patrol. A tradition exists that the troops used pipes to communicate between turrets. The fire provided some light; the absence of a chimney was made up for by an unglazed window. A stone water tank would have been set into the floor.

== Views of Leahill ==
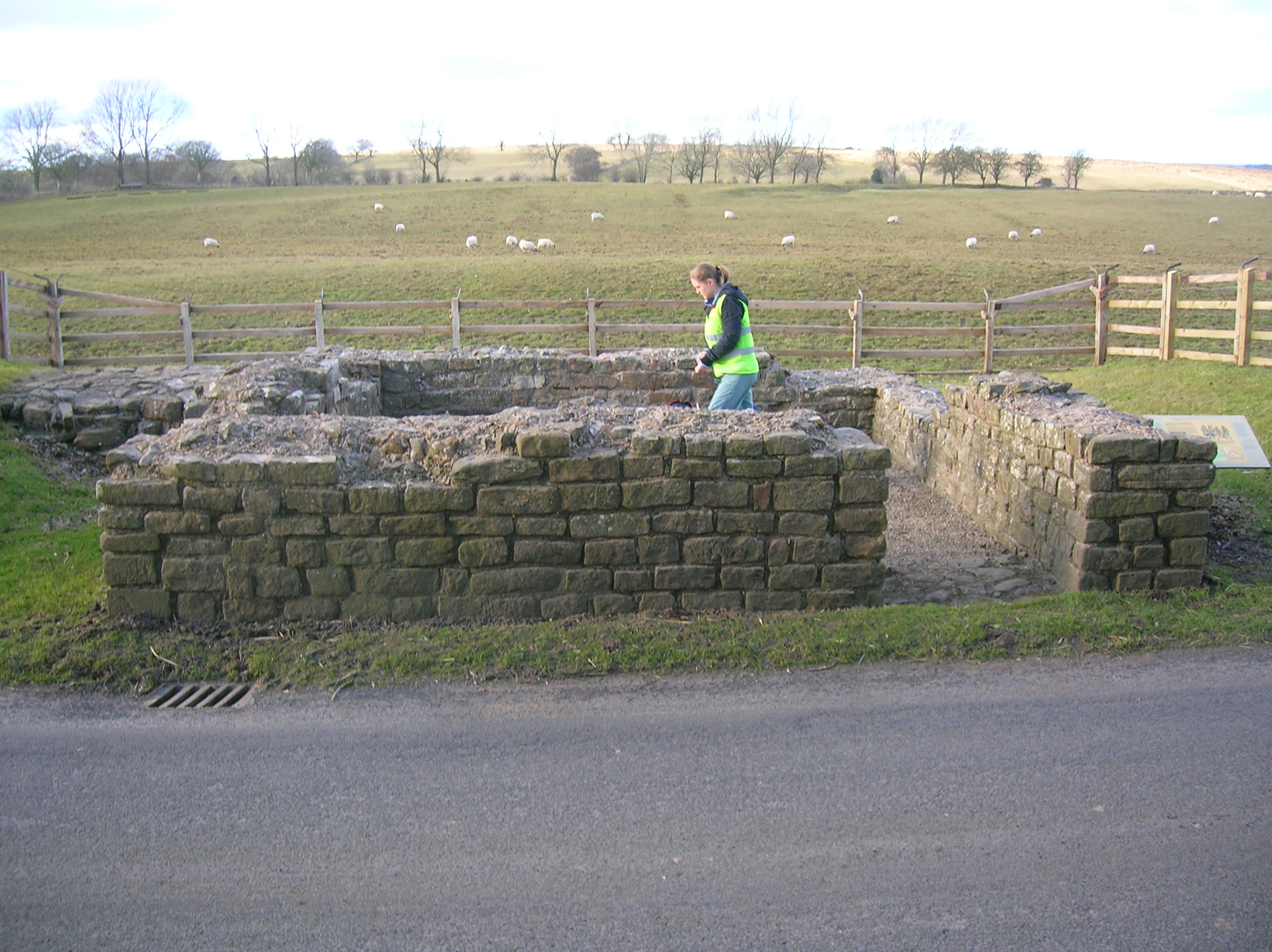
The turret, looking North

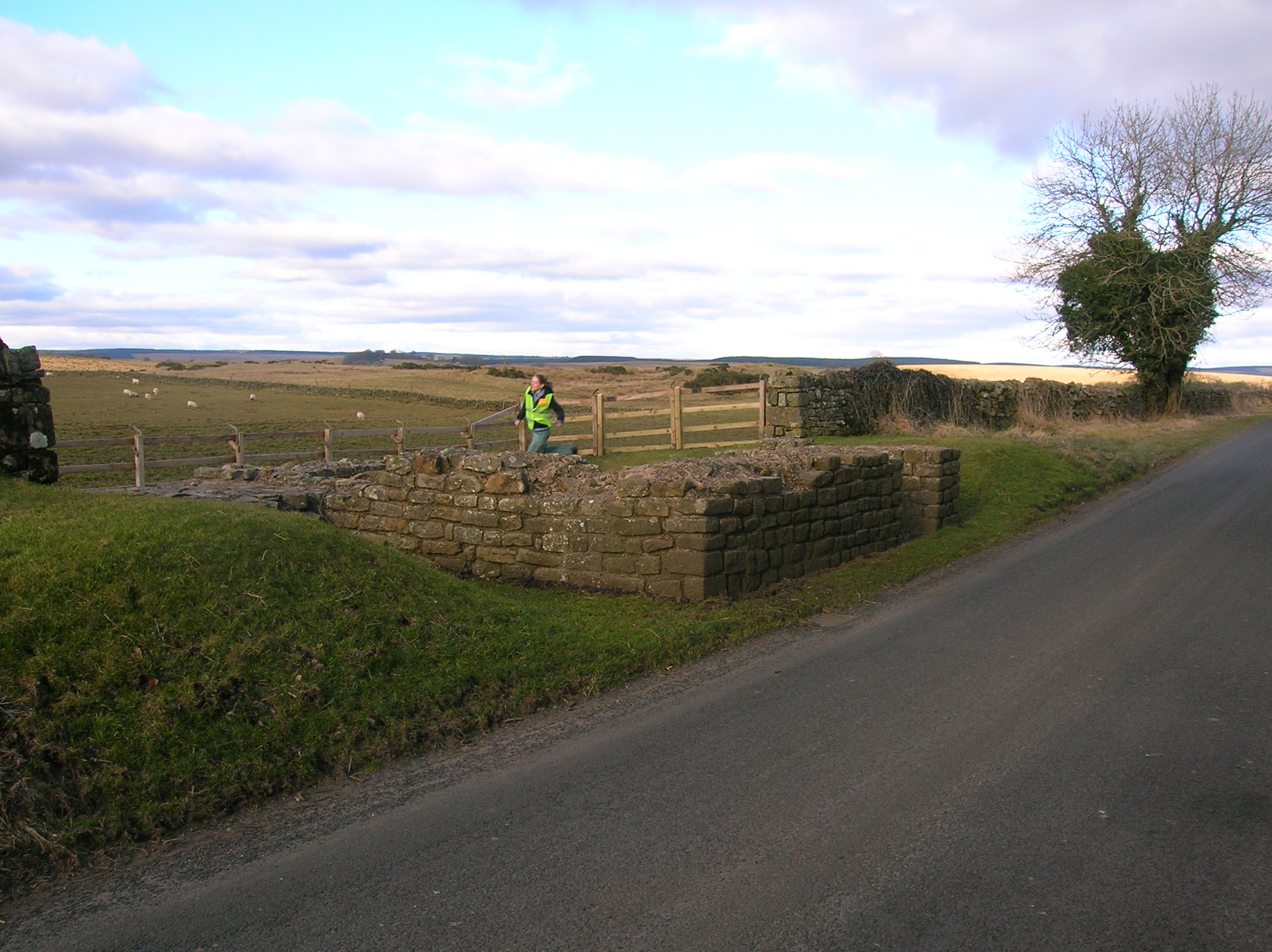
Looking North-East towards Tommy's Crag

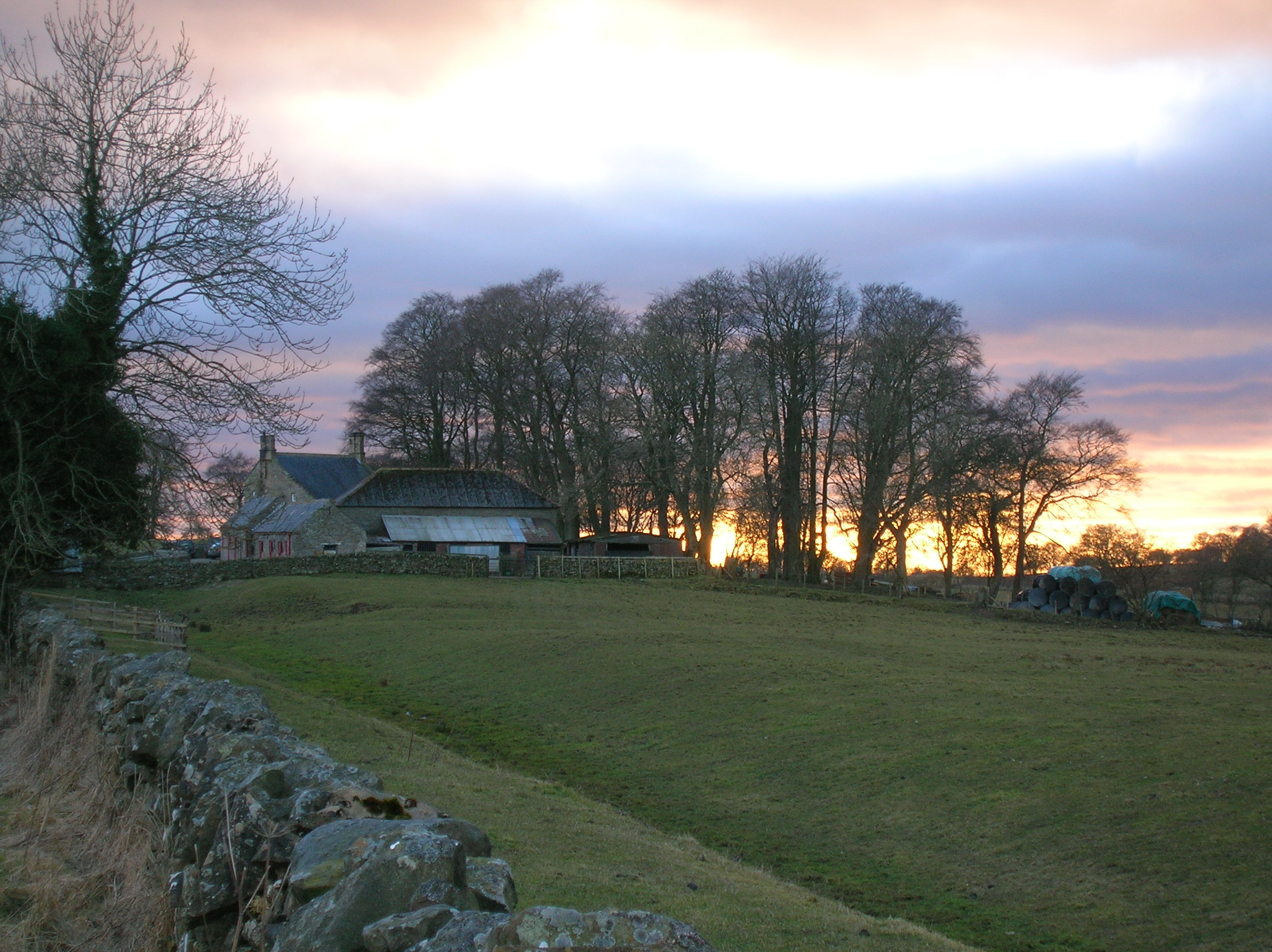
Leahill Farm and the fosse, looking West.
