= Illuminating Hadrian's Wall =

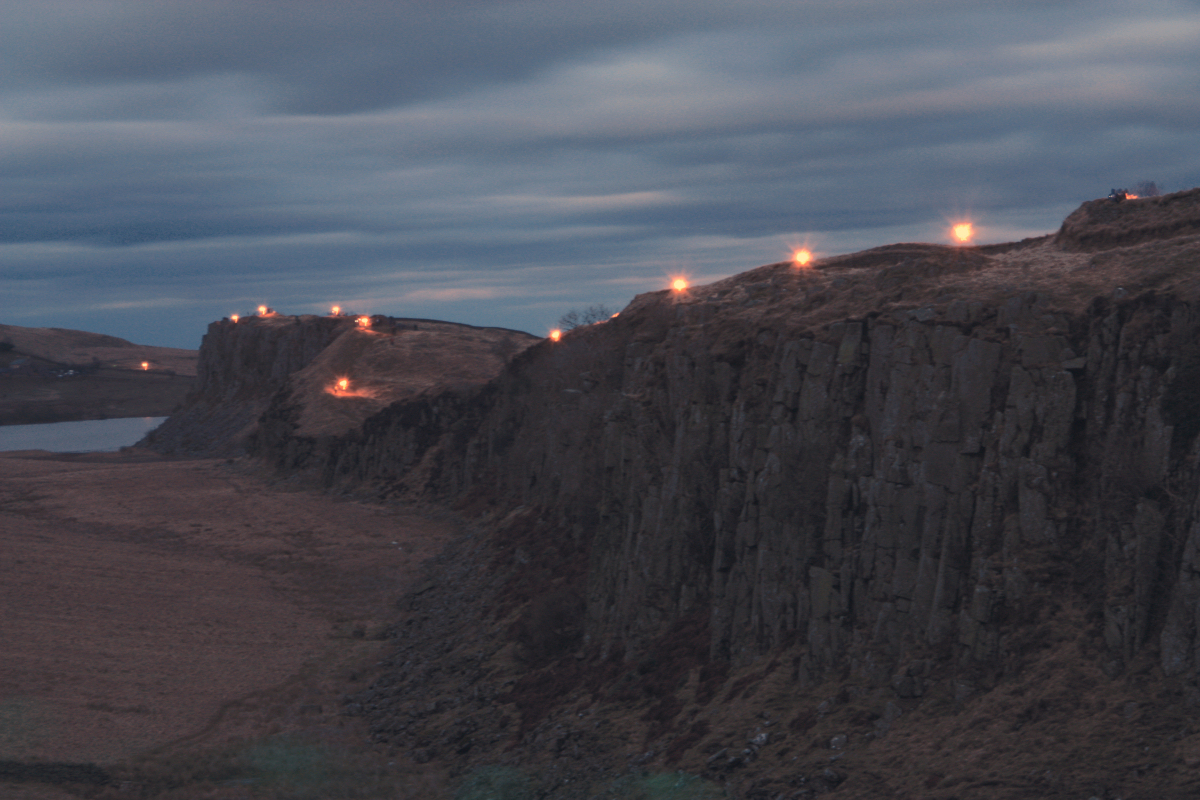
Beacons lit along Hadrian's Wall

Illuminating Hadrian's Wall was a public event on Hadrian's Wall which took place on 13 March 2010 and saw the route of the wall lit with beacons. The event was organised by Hadrian's Wall Heritage Ltd. and coincided with the 1600th anniversary of the End of Roman rule in Britain.

== Organisation ==
The 84-mile route was lit by 500 gas beacons, flares and torches at 250m intervals, with the assistance of more than 1000 volunteers. Approximately 120 landowners allowed access onto their lands for the event to take place.

The project was led by Hadrian's Wall Heritage Ltd and supported by several other groups, which formed part of North East England’s programme of festivals and events. The event marked the beginning of British Tourism week as supported by the Carlisle Tourism Partnership, and the 500 points of light were filmed by a helicopter at dusk.
