= Milecastle 42 =

Fort on Hadrian's Wall, England

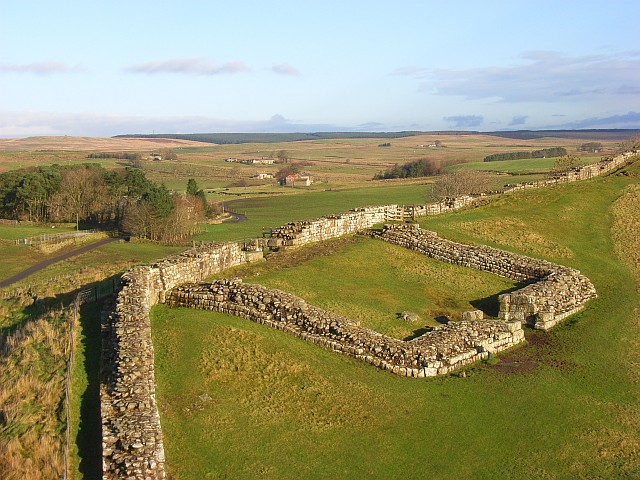
- The remains of Milecastle 42

- Location within Northumberland
- 54.993992°N 2.445829°W
- Type: Milecastle
- Location: Northumberland, England

Milecastle 42 (Cawfields) is a milecastle on Hadrian's Wall (grid reference NY7157466692).

== Description ==
Milecastle 42 is on a steep south-facing slope, 10 metres south of Cawfield Crags, and looks over Hole Gap to the west. It is on a well-preserved section of Hadrian's Wall. It measures 17.8 metres east–west by 14.4 metres north–south internally, with walls 2.8 metres thick and 1.4 metres high.

== Excavations ==
It was excavated in 1847–48 and again in 1936. The 1847–48 excavation uncovered part of a dedication slab indicating that the milecastle had been built by the Legio II Augusta. The 1936 excavations showed that the milecastle had a short axis, with a Type I gateway.

== Associated turrets ==
Each milecastle on Hadrian's Wall had two associated turret structures. These turrets were positioned approximately one-third and two-thirds of a Roman mile to the west of the Milecastle, and would probably have been manned by part of the milecastle's garrison. The turrets associated with Milecastle 42 are known as Turret 42A and Turret 42B.

=== Turret 42A ===
Turret 42A (Burn Head) (grid reference NY713666) has not been located as its remains have been destroyed by quarrying.

=== Turret 42B ===
Turret 42B (Great Chesters) (grid reference NY70846682) was located by exploratory excavation in 1912. The site is visible as a turf-covered platform 0.5 metres high.

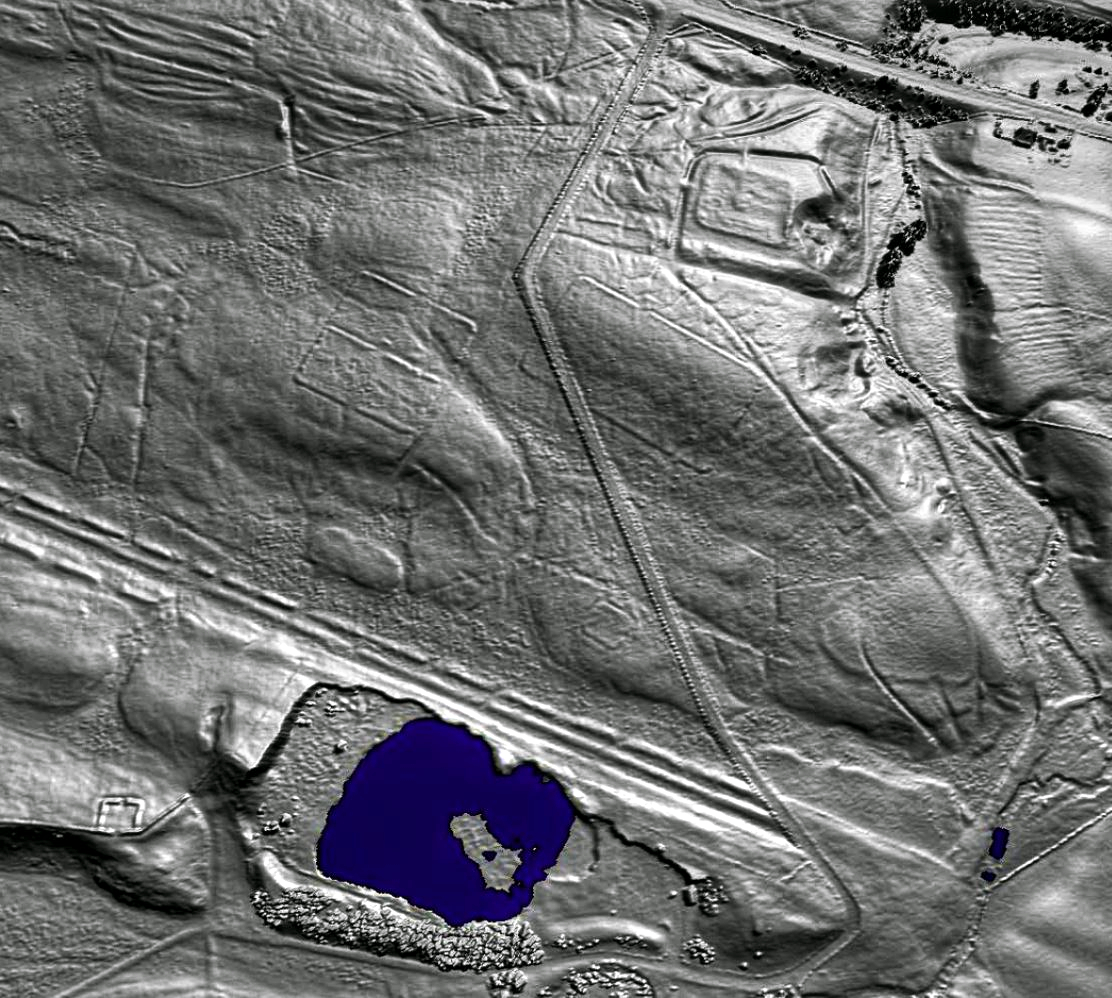
A lidar view of Haltwhistle Burn fortlet and Milecastle 42 on Hadrian's Wall with temporary Roman camps in between

== Public access ==
The milecastle and the site of Turrets 42B are both accessible via the Hadrian's Wall Path. Cawfields Picnic Area car park is on the line of the Hadrian's Wall Path, between the two sites. It is signposted from the B6318 (Military Road).
