= Milecastle 52 =

Fort on Hadrian's Wall in England

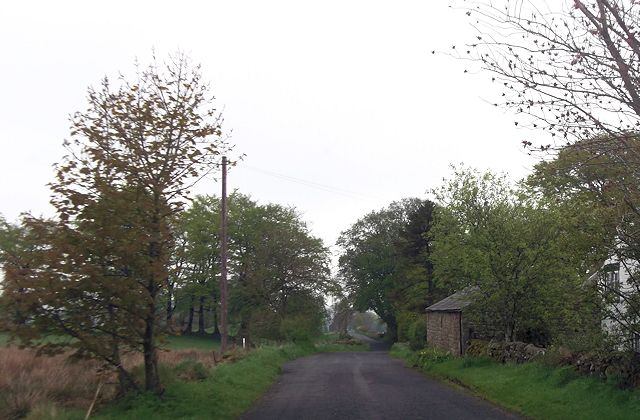
- Lane passing the site of Milecastle 52 at Bankshead

- Location within Cumbria
- 54.976967°N 2.658574°W
- Type: Milecastle
- Location: Cumbria, England

Milecastle 52 (Bankshead) was a milecastle on Hadrian's Wall (grid reference NY57946490).

== Description ==
Milecastle 52 is west of Birdoswald fort. It lies 1484 metres west of Milecastle 51 and 1520 metres east of Milecastle 53. The site is occupied by Bankshead House and garden. There is no trace of the milecastle visible.

== Excavations ==
Milecastle 52 was excavated in 1934. Although not now visible, excavation showed that it measures 27.5 m east to west by 23.4 m north to south and that it has Type III gateways. The stone milecastle replaced its underlying predecessor, Milecastle 52TW on the Turf Wall.

In 1808 two altars to the local deity Cocidius were discovered here. One of the altars was dedicated by soldiers of the Twentieth Legion in the years 262–6. In 1862 a broken slab was found with the name of Hadrian.

== Associated turrets ==
Each milecastle on Hadrian's Wall had two associated turret structures. These turrets were positioned approximately one-third and two-thirds of a Roman mile to the west of the Milecastle, and would probably have been manned by part of the milecastle's garrison. The turrets associated with Milecastle 52 are known as Turret 52A and Turret 52B.

=== Turret 52A ===
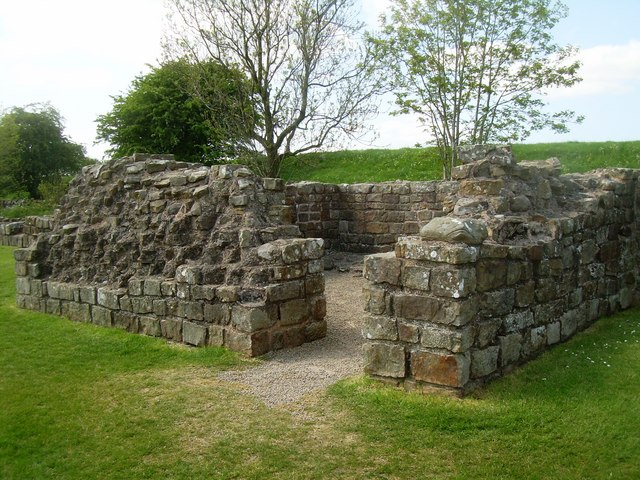
Turret 52A

Turret 52A (Banks East) (grid reference NY5747864729) is situated by the road east of Banks village. Excavations in 1933 uncovered remains of the demolished Turf Wall abutting the turret's east wall. The turret was in use from around the early 2nd century until at least the end of the 3rd century. The entrance is on the southeast side, and traces of two hearths and a low bench along the north west wall. The walls have been consolidated and restored, and stand to a maximum height of 1.75 metres. The turret was the first section of Hadrian's Wall to be placed in the guardianship of the Ancient Monuments department in 1934.

=== Turret 52B ===
Turret 52B (grid reference NY57006457) has never been located. Its position has been estimated in relation to Turret 52A and Milecastle 53. It may lie beneath the modern road.

== Pike Hill Signal Tower ==
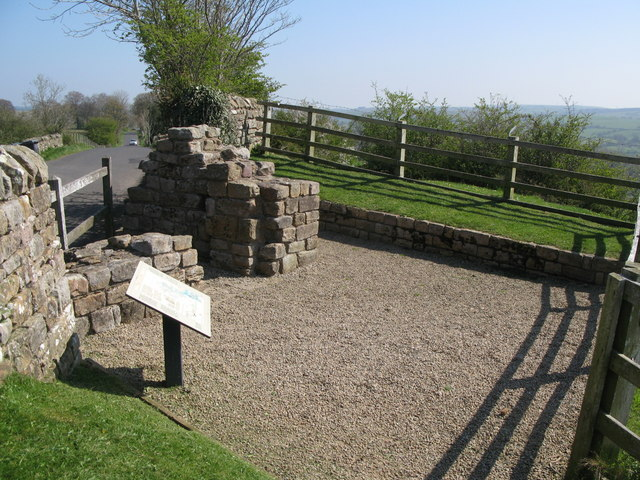
Pike Hill Signal Tower

The remains of Pike Hill Signal Tower are situated 170 metres east of Turret 52A. The greater part of the signal tower has been destroyed by the modern road, but a fragment of its southeast wall, 2 metres long and 0.8 metres wide, is south of the road. The signal tower is of interest because it predates Hadrian's Wall, which was later built around it. The tower remains are at an angle of 45° to the wall. The very deep foundations of the tower suggest it had extra height for signalling purposes.
