= Milecastle 54 =

Milecastle on Hadrian's Wall

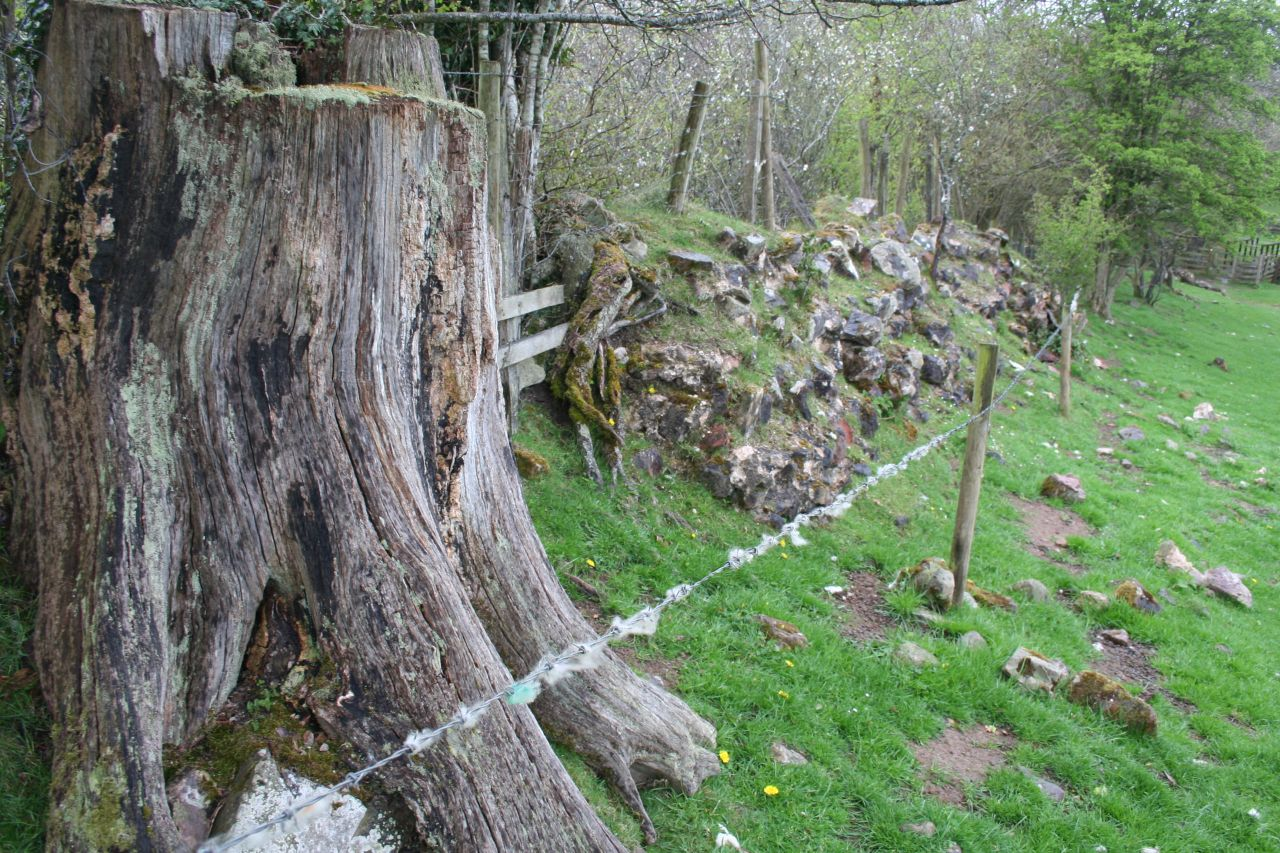
- Small fragment of Hadrian's Wall visible to the west of the site of Milecastle 54

- Location within Cumbria
- 54.972582°N 2.703493°W
- Type: Milecastle
- Location: Cumbria, England

Milecastle 54 (Randylands) was a milecastle on Hadrian's Wall (grid reference NY55066444).

== Description ==
Milecastle 54 is on a west-facing hill-slope northwest of the village of Lanercost. There is no trace of the milecastle visible, except for some indistinct earthworks.

A small section of Hadrian's Wall can be seen about 250 metres west of Milecastle 54, on the west side of Burtholme Beck. It stands as a length of mortared wall core about 1.7 metres high.

== Excavations ==
Milecastle 54 was excavated in 1934. It measured internally 19.3 metres east to west by 23.3 metres north to south. It contained a west barrack comprising two rooms, one of which had stone benches, a hearth and a millstone. It overlay an earlier Turf Wall milecastle.

== Associated turrets ==
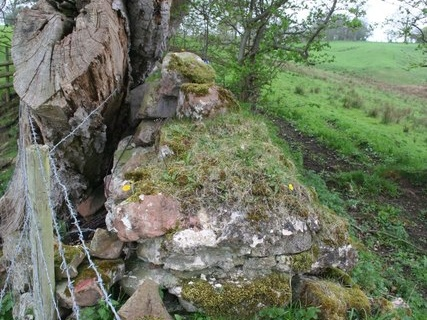
Small fragment of Hadrian's Wall just west of the site of Turret 54A

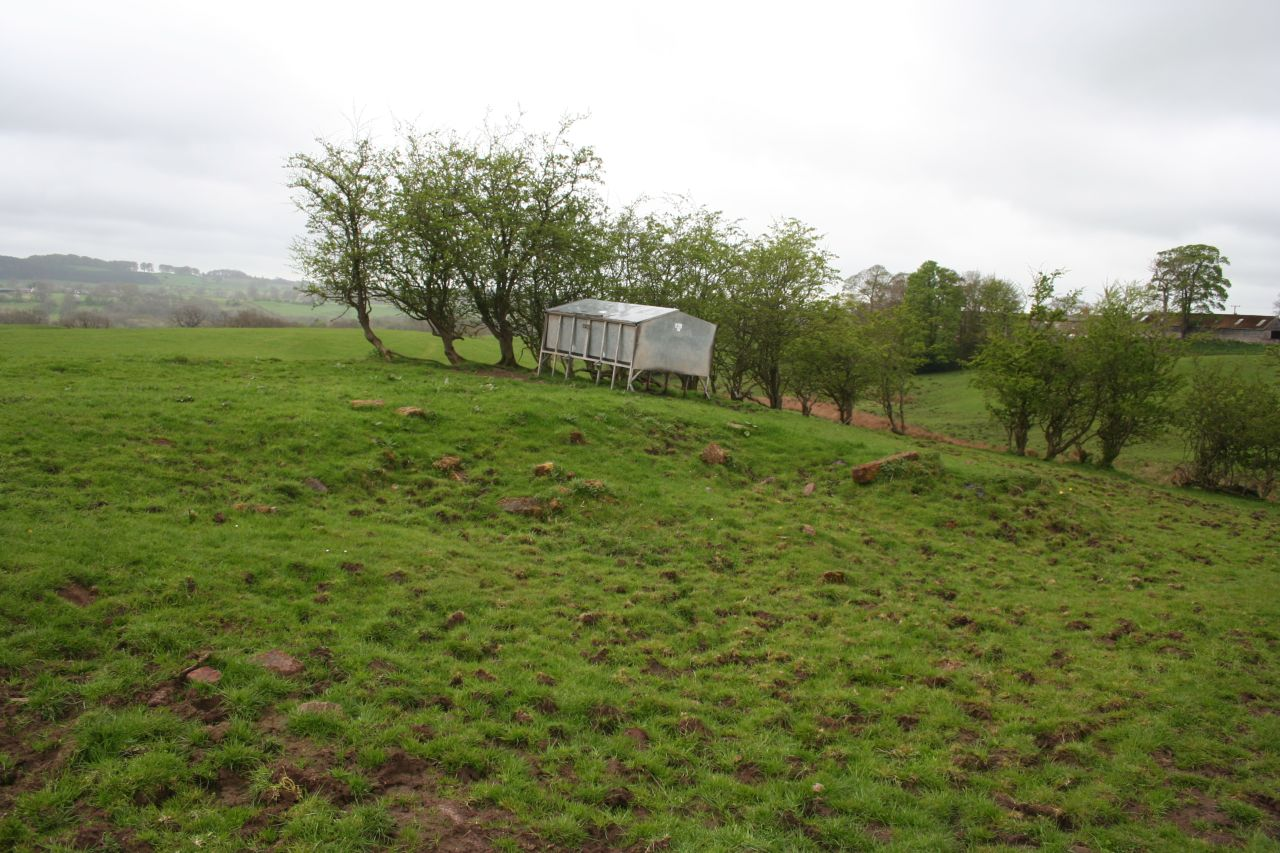
The site of Turret 54B

Each milecastle on Hadrian's Wall had two associated turret structures. These turrets were positioned approximately one-third and two-thirds of a Roman mile to the west of the Milecastle, and would probably have been manned by part of the milecastle's garrison. The turrets associated with Milecastle 54 are known as Turret 54A and Turret 54B.

=== Turret 54A ===
Turret 54A (Garthside) (grid reference NY54546439) was excavated in 1933. The excavations revealed two stone turrets. The earlier turret had stood upon bad ground and its front wall had collapsed, after which the second had been built upon the firmer crest of the hill. The pottery found at both turrets suggested they were built in the early 2nd century and occupation probably ceased about 180 AD. There are no surface remains visible.

Hadrian's Wall in the vicinity of Turret 54A survives as a substantial turf covered bank at the base of a hedge.

=== Turret 54B ===
Turret 54B (Howgill) (grid reference NY54076439) was also excavated in 1933. The excavations uncovered four courses of red sandstone masonry. There are no surface remains visible.

A small inscribed centurial stone can be seen 190 metres southwest of the site of Turret 54B. It was found in or before 1717, and is built into the external wall of the east range of buildings at Howgill Farm. It records the work done by the Catuvellauni in rebuilding this section of Hadrian's Wall in AD 369.
