= Hadrian's Wall =

Defensive fortification in Roman Britain

- The location of Hadrian's Wall in what is now northern England, and the later Antonine Wall in what is now the Central Belt of Scotland
- Interactive map of Hadrian's Wall
- 55°01′N 2°17′W
- Location: Northern England

History
- Built: Begun 122 AD
- Built for: Hadrian

Site notes
- Length: 73 miles (117 km)
- Governing body: Historic England
- Owner: Various private and public ownerships
- Visitors: 100,000+ annually

UNESCO World Heritage Site
- Designated: 1987 (11th session)
- Part of: Frontiers of the Roman Empire
- Reference no.: 430

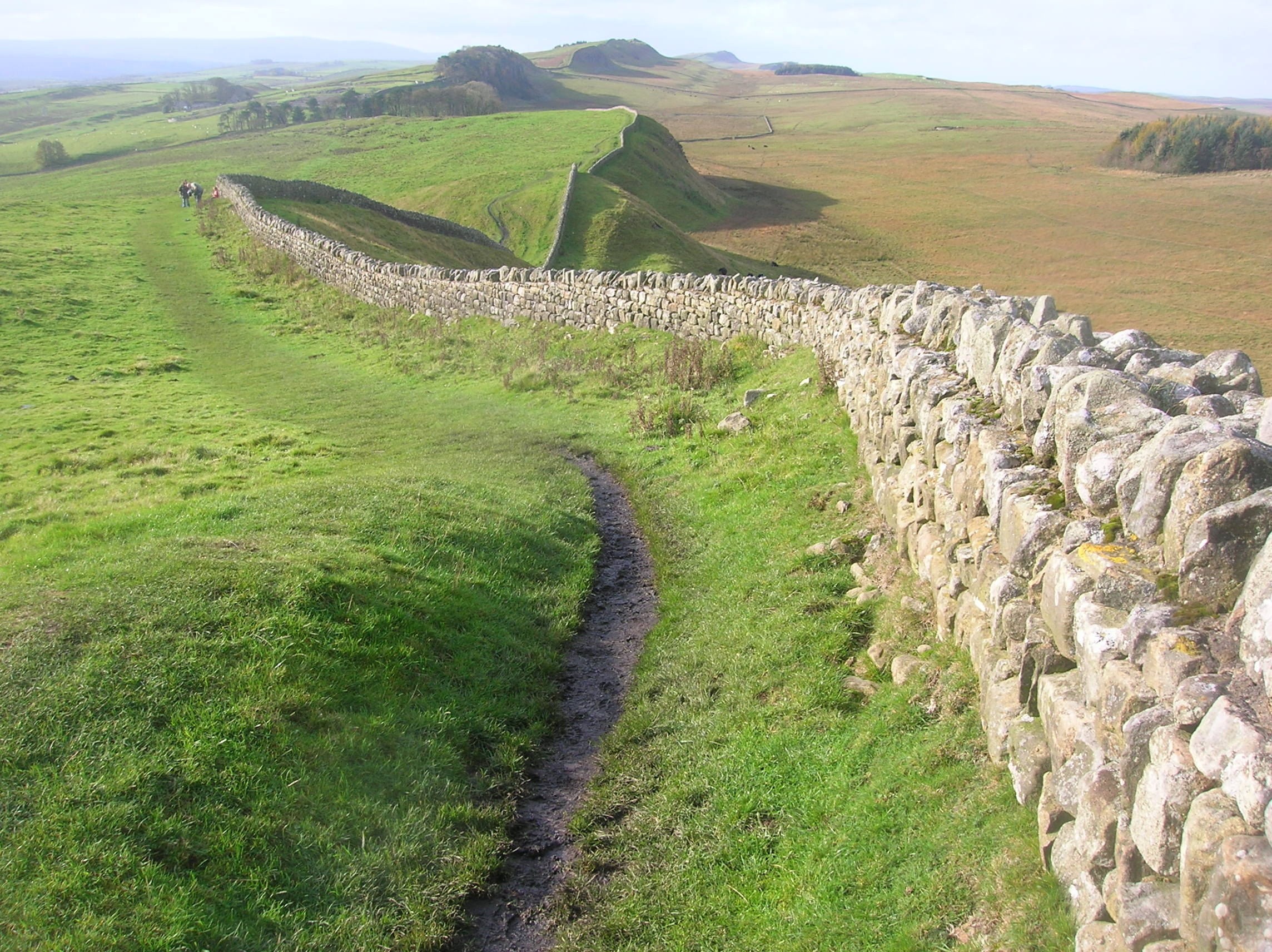
A view of a partially-reconstructed section of Hadrian's Wall. The upright stones on top are a modern addition, to deter people from walking on it.

Hadrian's Wall is a former defensive fortification of the Roman province of Britannia, begun in AD 122 in the reign of the Emperor Hadrian. Running from Wallsend on the River Tyne in the east to Bowness-on-Solway in the west of what is now northern England, it was a stone wall (in its final version) with large ditches in front and behind, stretching across the whole width of the island. Soldiers were garrisoned along the line of the wall in large forts, smaller milecastles, and intervening turrets. In addition to the wall's defensive military role, its gates may have been customs posts.

Hadrian's Wall Path generally runs close along the wall. Almost all the standing masonry of the wall was removed in early modern times and used for local roads and farmhouses. None of it stands to its original height, but modern work has exposed much of the footings, and some segments display a few courses of modern masonry reconstruction. Many of the excavated forts on or near the wall are open to the public, and various nearby museums present its history. The largest Roman archaeological feature in Britain, it runs a total of 73 miles (117.5 kilometres). Regarded as a British cultural icon, Hadrian's Wall is one of Britain's major ancient tourist attractions. It was designated a UNESCO World Heritage Site in 1987. The turf-built Antonine Wall of AD 142 in what is now central Scotland, which briefly superseded Hadrian's Wall before being abandoned, was declared a World Heritage Site in 2008.

Hadrian's Wall lies entirely within England and has never formed the Anglo-Scottish border, though it is sometimes loosely or colloquially described as such.

== Dimensions ==
Limes and Hadrian's Wall (Latin with English subtitles)

The length of the wall was 80 Roman miles, equivalent to 73 modern miles or 117 kilometres (1 Roman mile is equivalent to 1,620 yards or 1,480 metres). This traversed the entire width of the island, from Bowness-on-Solway in the west to Wallsend on the River Tyne in the east. Not long after construction began, the wall's thickness was reduced from the originally planned 10 feet (3.0 m) to about 8 feet (2.4 m), or even less depending on the terrain. Some sections were originally constructed of turf and timber, eventually replaced by stone years or decades later.

None of the wall stands to its original height. Bede, a monk and historian who died in AD 735, wrote that the wall stood 12 feet (3.7 metres) high, with evidence suggesting it could have been a few feet higher at its formation. Along the length of the wall there was a watch-tower turret every third of a mile, also providing shelter and living accommodation for Roman troops.

== Route ==
Route of Hadrian's Wall, almost from coast to coast

Ordnance Survey map of Hadrian's Wall, published in 1964. A revised and updated edition was published in 2010.

Sections of Hadrian's Wall still remain, particularly in its hilly central sector. Little remains in lowland regions, where it was used as a source of stone for new buildings.

Hadrian's Wall extended west from Segedunum at Wallsend on the River Tyne, via Carlisle and Kirkandrews-on-Eden, to the shore of the Solway Firth, ending a short but unknown distance west of the village of Bowness-on-Solway. The route was slightly north of Stanegate, an important Roman road built several decades earlier to link two forts that guarded important river crossings: Corstopitum (Corbridge) on the River Tyne and Luguvalium (Carlisle) on the River Eden. The modern A69 and B6318 roads follow the course of the wall from Newcastle upon Tyne to Carlisle, then along the northern coast of Cumbria (south shore of the Solway Firth).

Part of the central section of the wall follows natural cliffs on an escarpment of the Whin Sill rock formation.

Although the curtain wall ends near Bowness-on-Solway, this does not mark the end of the line of defensive structures. The system of milecastles and turrets is known to have continued along the Cumbria coast as far as Risehow, south of Maryport. For classification purposes, the milecastles west of Bowness-on-Solway are referred to as Milefortlets.

== Purpose ==
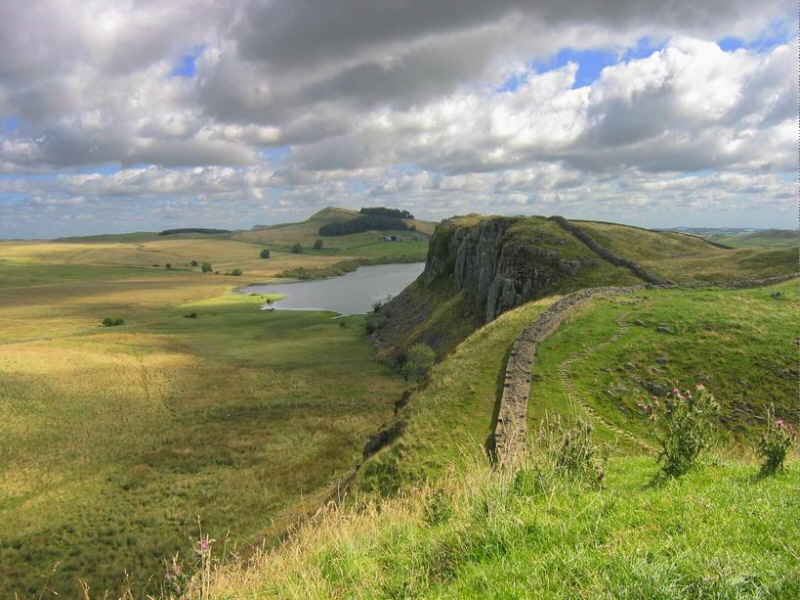
Hadrian's Wall facing east towards Crag Lough (the lake in the picture). The rocky outcrop is the Whin Sill, of volcanic origin.

Hadrian's Wall was probably planned before Hadrian's visit to Britain in 122. According to restored sandstone fragments found in Jarrow which date from 118 or 119, it was Hadrian's wish to keep "intact the empire", which had been imposed on him via "divine instruction". On Hadrian's accession to the imperial throne in 117, there was unrest and rebellion in Roman Britain and from the peoples of various conquered lands across the empire, including Egypt, Judea, Libya and Mauretania. These troubles may have influenced his plan to construct the wall, as well as his construction of frontier boundaries now known as limes in other areas of the empire, such as the Limes Germanicus in modern-day Germany.

The novelty of the wall as a departure from traditional Roman military architecture as typified by the Roman limes has been seen as noteworthy and has led to exceptional suggestions of influence by some scholars; for example, David Breeze and B. Dobson suggest "Hadrian may have been influenced by travellers' accounts of the Great Wall of China, built some two hundred years before." This proposal has been challenged by other scholars like Duncan B. Campbell who argues that, though the scale and design of the wall was novel for Roman military construction, "there was a long tradition of wall-building in the ancient (Mediterranean) world upon which he could have drawn for inspiration without the inconvenience of traversing whole continents in search of a prototype."

In recent years, despite the evidence of the wall's over 270-year manned presence, some scholars have disagreed with the established narrative over how much of a threat the inhabitants of northern Britain presented to the Romans, and whether there was any economic advantage in defending and garrisoning a fixed line of defences like the wall, rather than conquering and annexing what has become Northumberland and the Scottish Lowlands and then defending the territory with a looser arrangement of forts. Hadrian and his advisers however produced a solution to their problems that remained relevant for centuries.

The primary purpose of the wall was as a physical barrier to slow the crossing of raiders, people intent on crossing its line for animals, treasure, or slaves, and then returning with their loot. The Latin text Historia Augusta states:

(Hadrianus) murumque per octoginta milia passuum primus duxit, qui barbaros Romanosque divideret.

Translation:

(Hadrian) was the first to build a wall, eighty miles long, to separate the Romans from the barbarians.

The defensive characteristics of the wall support interpretation, including the pits known as cippi frequently found on the berm or flat area in front of the wall. These pits held branches or small tree trunks entangled with sharpened branches. These would make an attack on the wall even more difficult. It might be thought of as the Roman equivalent of barbed wire, a measure to delay an enemy attack and hold the attackers within range of the missiles of the defenders. The curtain wall was not mainly a continuously-embattled defensive line, rather it would deter casual crossing and be an observation point that could alert Romans of an incoming attack and slow down enemy forces so that additional troops could arrive for support.

Besides a defensive structure made to keep people out, the wall also kept people within the Roman province. Movement would be channeled through the gates in the wall, where it could be monitored for information, prevented or permitted as appropriate, and taxed.

The wall would also have had a psychological impact:

For nearly three centuries, until the end of Roman rule in Britain in 410 AD, Hadrian's Wall was the clearest statement of the might, resourcefulness, and determination of an individual emperor and of his empire.

The wall was also a symbolic statement of Rome's imperial power, marking the border between the so called civilized world and the unconquered barbarian wilderness. As British archaeologist Neil Faulkner explains, "the wall, like other great Roman frontier monuments was as much a propaganda statement as a functional facility". There is some evidence that Hadrian's Wall was originally covered in plaster and then whitewashed: its shining surface would have reflected the sunlight and been visible for miles around.

== Construction ==
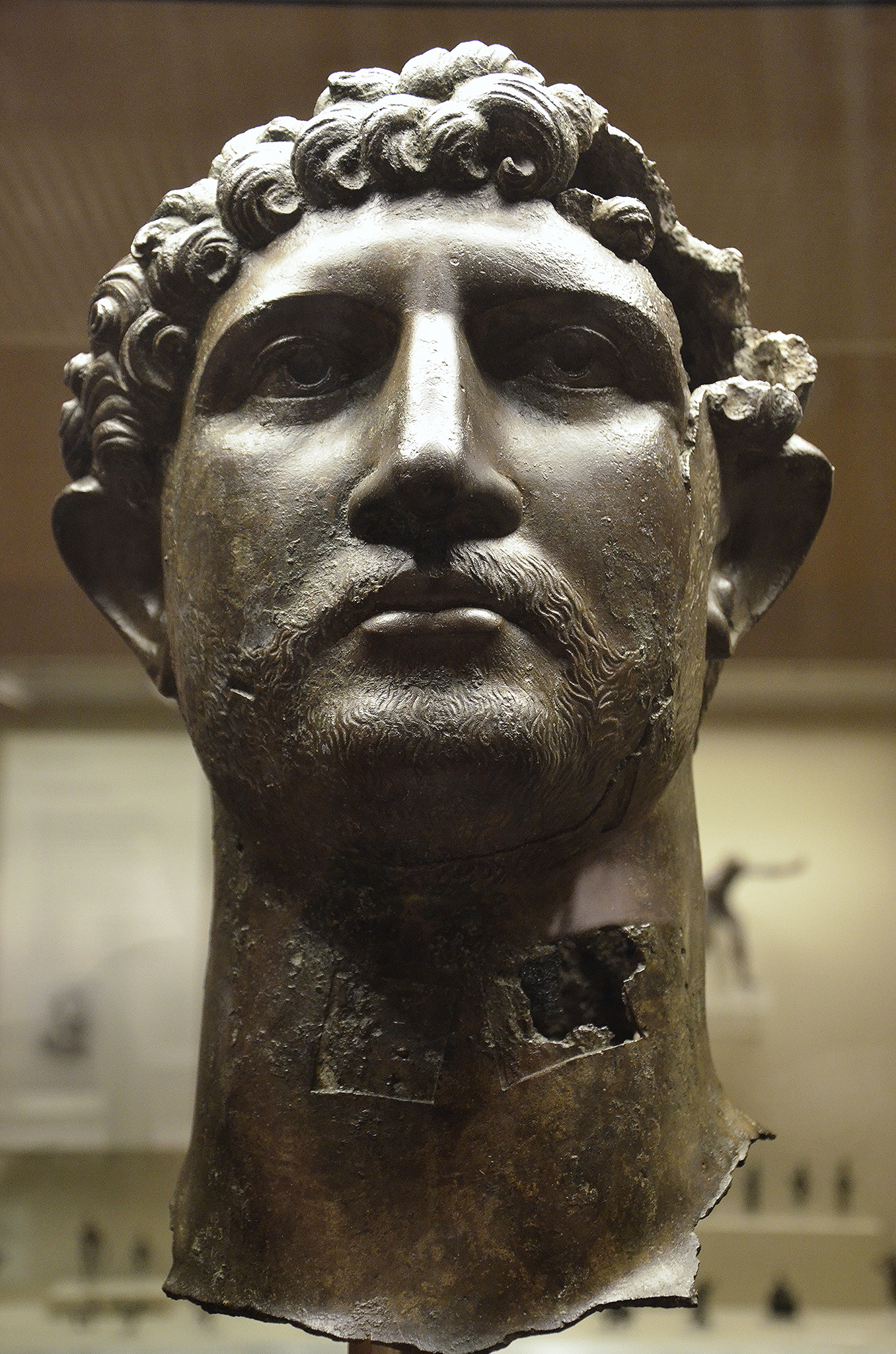
Bronze head of the Emperor Hadrian, who commissioned the wall's construction, found in 1834 in the River Thames in London, around 280 miles (450 km) south of Hadrian's Wall

Hadrian ended his predecessor Trajan's policy of expanding the empire and instead focused on defending the current borders, namely at the time Britain. Like Augustus, Hadrian believed in exploiting natural boundaries such as rivers for the borders of the empire, for example the Euphrates, Rhine and Danube. Britain, however, did not have any natural boundaries that could serve the purpose of dividing the province controlled by the Romans from the Celtic tribes in the north.

With construction starting in 122, the entire length of the wall was built with an alternating series of forts, each housing 600 men, and manned milecastles, operated by "between 12 and 20 men". It took six years to build most of Hadrian's Wall with the work coming from three Roman legions – the Legio II Augusta, Legio VI Victrix, and Legio XX Valeria Victrix, totalling 15,000 soldiers, plus some members of the Roman fleet. The building of the wall was not out of the area of expertise for the soldiers; some would have trained to be surveyors, engineers, masons, and carpenters.

=== "Broad Wall" and "Narrow Wall" ===
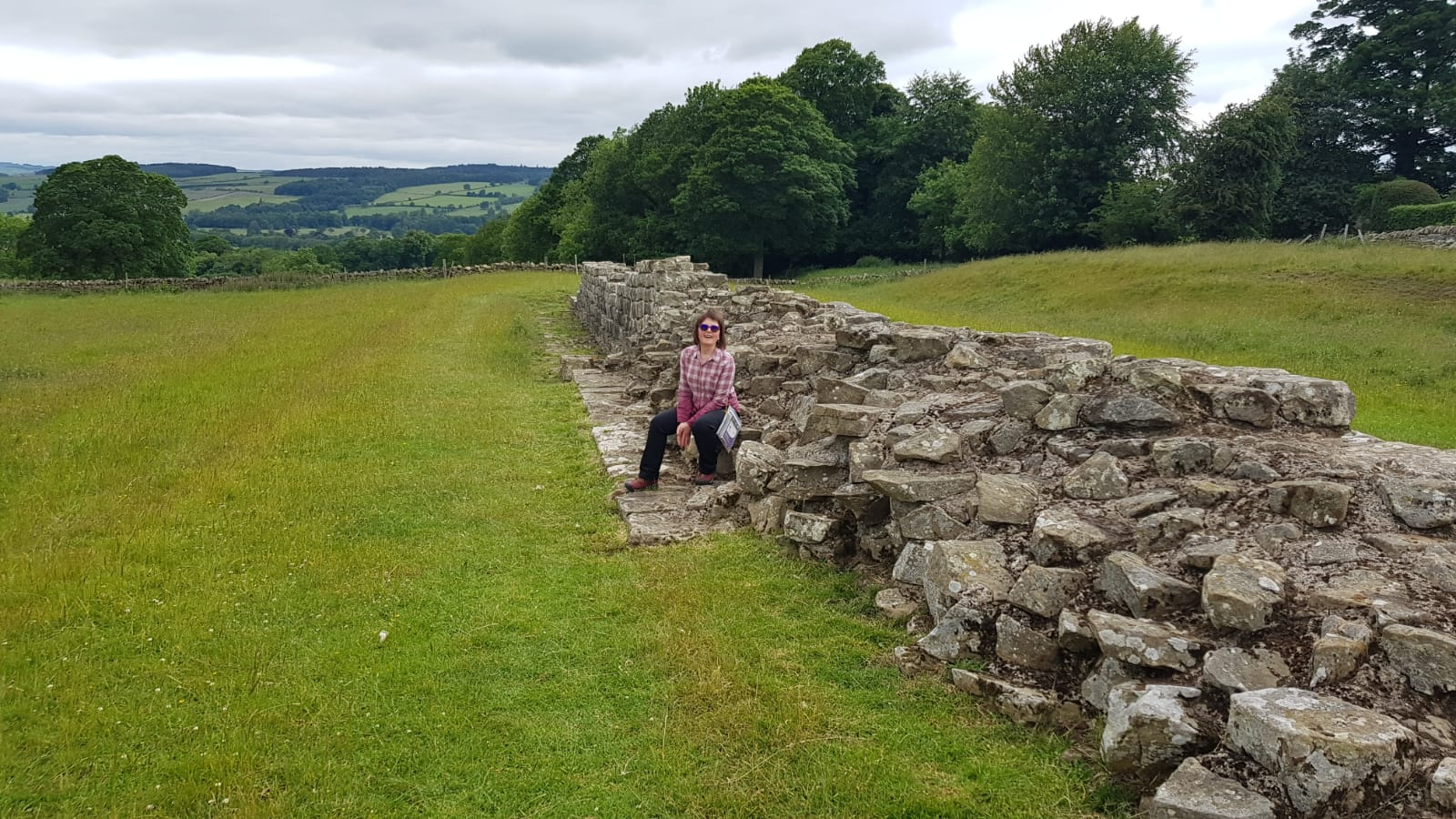
The footings of the wall, showing the point at which the Broad Wall and the Narrow Wall footings meet

R. G. Collingwood cites evidence for the existence of a broad section of the wall and conversely a narrow section. He argues that plans changed during construction of the wall, and its overall width was reduced. Broad sections of the wall are around nine and a half feet (2.9 metres) wide with the narrow sections two feet (61 centimetres) thinner, around seven and a half feet (2.3 metres) wide. Some of the narrow sections were found to be built upon broad foundations, which had presumably been built before the plans changed.

Based on this evidence, Collingwood concludes that the wall was originally to be built between present-day Newcastle at its eastern end and Bowness-on-Solway at its western end, with a uniform width of 10 Roman feet, all in stone. On completion, only three-fifths of the wall was built from stone; the remaining western section was a turf wall, later rebuilt in stone. Plans possibly changed due to a lack of resources. In an effort to preserve resources further, the eastern half's width was therefore reduced from the original ten Roman feet to eight, with the remaining stones from the eastern half used for around 5 miles (8.0 kilometres) of the turf wall in the west. This reduction from the original ten Roman feet to eight created the so-called "Narrow Wall".

=== Vallum ===
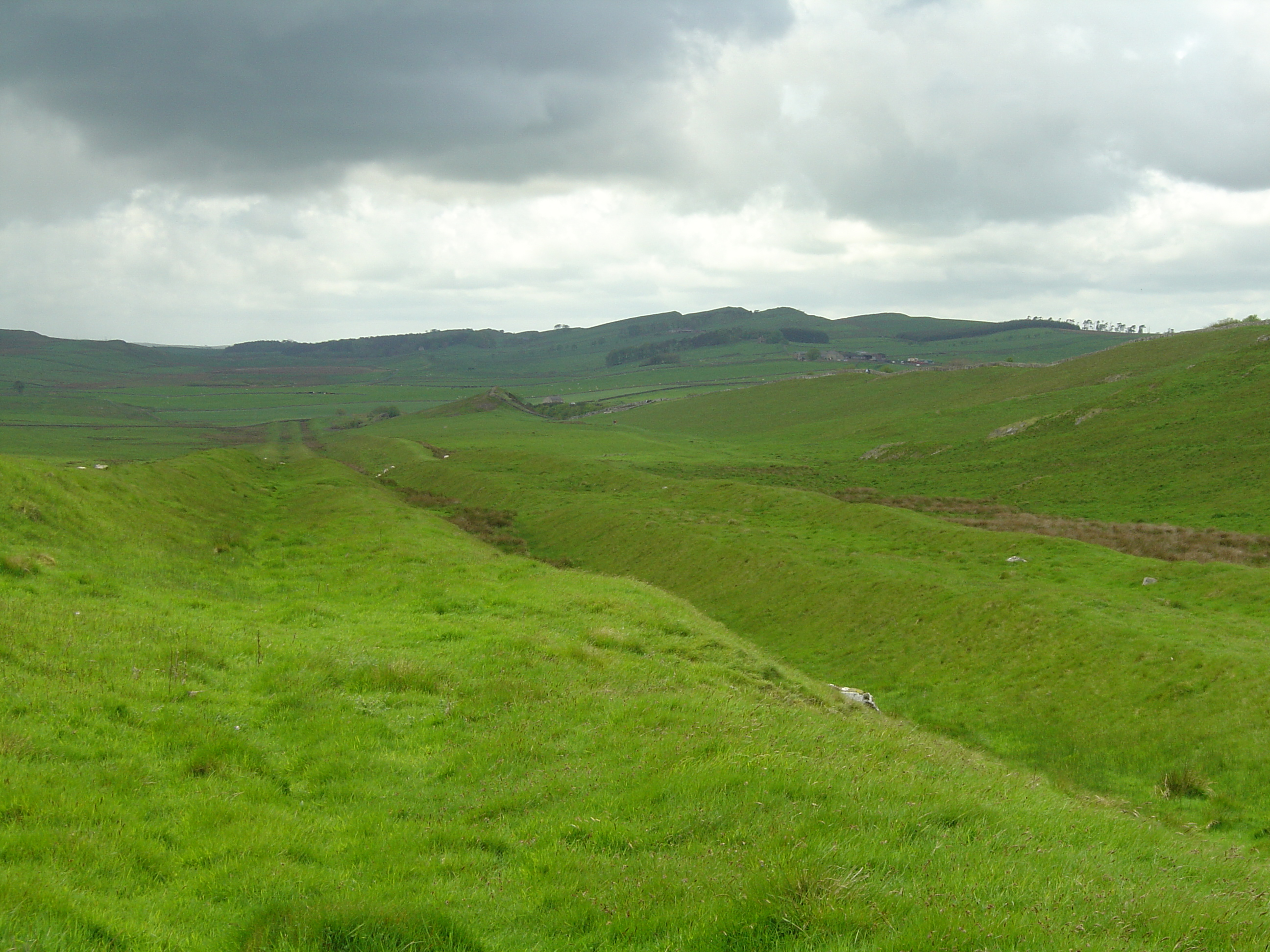
This ditch-like construction is a section of the Vallum, to the south of Hadrian's Wall. This section is located near Milecastle 42, around modern Cawfields, placing it slightly to the west of the wall's midpoint.

Just south of the wall there is a deep, ditch-like construction with two parallel mounds running north and south of it, known as the Vallum. The Vallum and the wall run more or less in parallel for almost the entire length of the wall, except between the forts of Newcastle and Wallsend at the east end, where the Vallum may have been considered superfluous as a barrier on account of the close proximity of the River Tyne. The twin track of the wall and Vallum led many 19th-century thinkers to note and ponder their relation to one another.

Some evidence appears to show that the route of the wall was shifted to avoid the Vallum, possibly pointing to the Vallum being an older construction. R. G. Collingwood therefore asserted in 1930 that the Vallum was built before the wall in its final form. Collingwood also questioned whether the Vallum was an original border built before the wall. Based on this, the wall could be viewed as a replacement border built to strengthen the Romans' definition of their territory.

In 1936, further research suggested that the Vallum could not have been built before the wall because the Vallum avoided one of the wall's milecastles. This new discovery was continually supported by more evidence, strengthening the idea that there was a simultaneous construction of the Vallum and the wall.

Other evidence still pointed in other, slightly different directions. Evidence shows that the Vallum preceded sections of the Narrow Wall specifically; to account for this discrepancy, Couse suggests that either construction of the Vallum began with the Broad Wall, or it began when the Narrow Wall succeeded the Broad Wall but proceeded more quickly than that of the Narrow Wall.

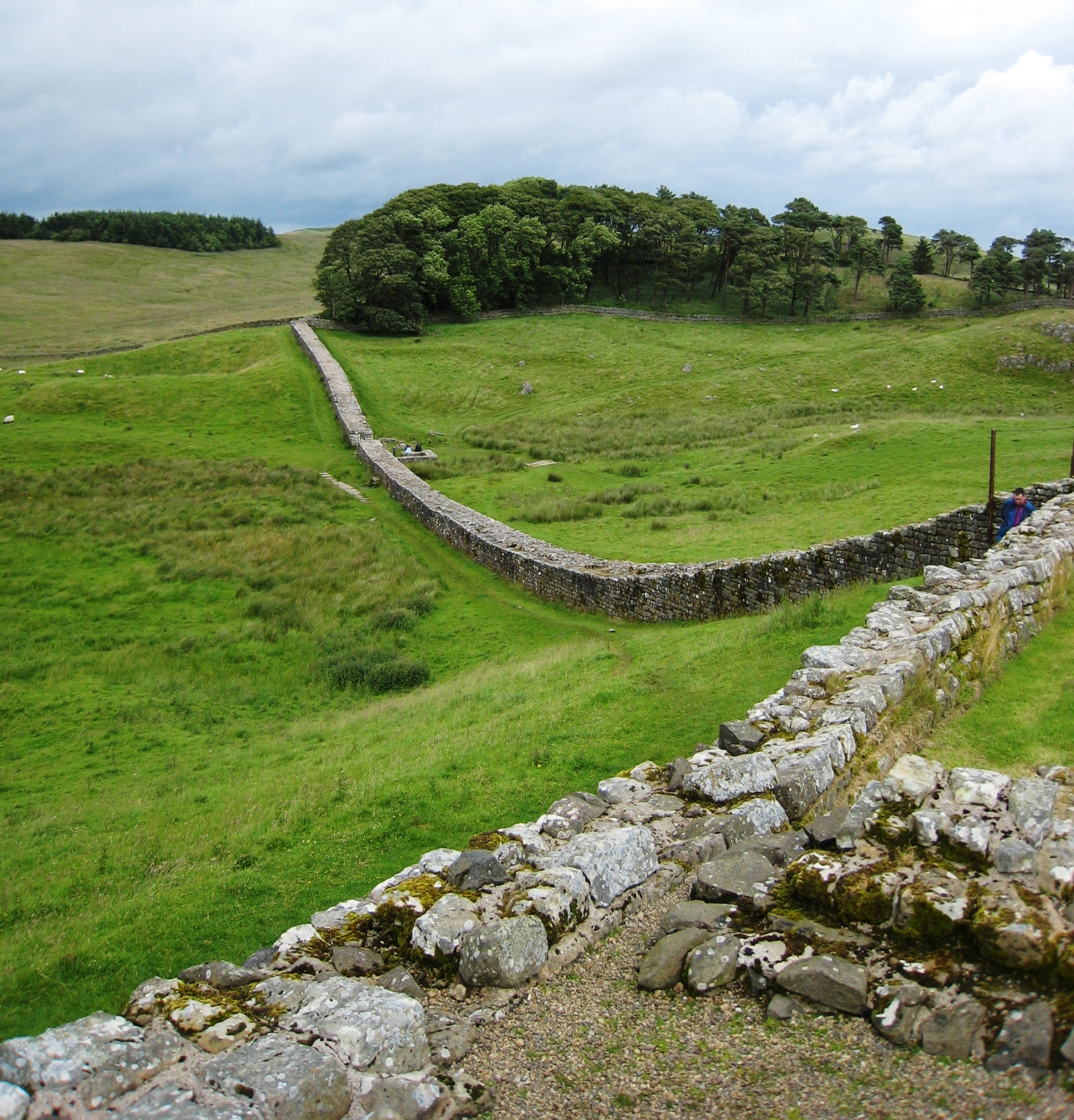
Part of Hadrian's Wall heading east from Housesteads fort, showing the Knag Burn Gateway in the valley. The very flat top of the wall at centre is a sign of modern consolidation.

=== Turf wall ===
From Milecastle 49 to the western terminus at Bowness-on-Solway, the wall was originally constructed from turf, possibly due to the absence of limestone. Subsequently, the turf wall was demolished and replaced with a stone wall. This took place in two phases; the first (from the River Irthing to a point west of Milecastle 54) during the reign of Hadrian, and the second following the reoccupation of Hadrian's Wall after the abandonment of the Antonine Wall (though it has also been suggested that this second phase took place during the reign of Septimius Severus). The line of the stone wall follows the line of the turf wall, apart from the stretch between Milecastle 49 and Milecastle 51, where the line of the stone wall is slightly further to the north.

In the stretch around Milecastle 50TW, it was built on a flat base with three to four courses of turf blocks. A basal layer of cobbles was used westwards from Milecastle 72 (at Burgh-by-Sands) and possibly at Milecastle 53. Where the underlying ground was boggy, wooden piles were used.

At its base, the turf wall was 6 metres (20 feet) wide, built in courses of turf blocks measuring 46 cm (18 inches) long by 30 cm (12 inches) deep by 15 cm (6 inches) high, to a height around 3.66 metres (12.0 feet). The north face is thought to have had a slope of 75%, whereas the south face is thought to have started vertical above the foundation, quickly becoming much shallower.

=== Standards ===
Above the stone curtain wall's foundations, one or more footing courses were laid. Offsets were introduced above these footing courses (on both the north and south faces), which reduced the wall's width. Where the width of the curtain wall is stated, it is in reference to the width above the offset. Two standards of offset have been identified: Standard A, where the offset occurs above the first footing course, and Standard B, where the offset occurs after the third (or sometimes fourth) footing course.

== Garrison ==
It is thought that following construction and when fully manned, almost 10,000 soldiers were stationed on Hadrian's Wall, made up not of the legions who built it but by regiments of auxiliary infantry and cavalry drawn from the provinces. Following from this lays out the two basic functions for soldiers on or around Hadrian's Wall. Breeze says that soldiers who were stationed in the forts around the wall had the primary duty of defence; at the same time, the troops in the milecastles and turrets had the responsibility of frontier control. Evidence, as Breeze says, for soldiers stationed in forts is far more pronounced than the ones in the milecastles and turrets.

Breeze discusses three theories about the soldiers on Hadrian's Wall. Firstly, these soldiers who manned the milecastles and turrets on the wall came from the forts near it. Secondly, regiments from auxiliaries were specifically chosen for this role. Thirdly, "a special force" was formed to man these stations. Breeze comes to the conclusion that through all the inscriptions gathered there were soldiers from three, or even four, auxiliary units at milecastles on the wall. These units were "cohors I Batavorum, cohors I Vardullorum, an un-numbered Pannonian cohort, and a duplicarius from Upper Germany". Breeze adds that there appears to have been some legionaries as well at these milecastles. Breeze states that evidence is "still open on whether" soldiers who manned the milecastles were from nearby forts or were specifically chosen for this task, and he adds that "the balance [of evidence] perhaps lies towards the latter". However, soldiers from the three British legions outnumbered the auxiliaries, which goes against the assertion that legionaries would not be used on such detached duties.

== Social and economic impact ==
=== Unified cultural area ===
By about 200 BC, long before the Romans arrived in Britannia, the zone on both sides of what would become the wall, from Lothian to the north and the River Wear to the south, had become dominated by rectilinear enclosures. These were the nuclei of extensive farming settlements at a high level of the social hierarchy, a numerous and widespread nobility; the lower orders lived in groups of roundhouses that left much less archaeological trace. The wall probably cut across a coherent cultural area, and it was planned and built at a time of serious warfare in Britain, which required major Roman reinforcements from outside Britannia. A tablet from Vindolanda fort describes a centurio regionarius who exercised direct military rule from Carlisle, some 30 years after Roman conquest of the region. Nevertheless, the settlement pattern in the area did not change immediately after the wall was built, and the groups who fought the Romans may have been from previously pacified tribes to the south, or from far north of the wall.

The Roman soldiers of the garrison, with their families and other immigrants, may have amounted to some 22-30% of the population of the region. They could not have been supplied entirely from local resources, although any local surpluses would have been taxed or requisitioned. Military conscripts may also have been levied from nearby groups.

=== South of the wall ===
To the south, between the wall and the River Tees, Roman-style settlements appear in the early 2nd century, very shortly after the wall was built. This is earlier than Roman villas in Yorkshire further south. Mortaria stamped with the name ANAVS were produced at Faverdale in Darlington, some 80 kilometres south of the wall, and most of those found have come from the fort of Coria. Anaus was probably an immigrant to the area. In 150, a discharge certificate was issued to Velvotigernus, son of Maglotigernus, after 26 years’ service in the classis Germanica. It was found near (not in) the Roman fort of Longovicium. Presumably Velvotigernus was from the upper echelons of British society (his father's name means 'Great master'); he chose to settle near Lanchester some 27km south of the wall. This suggests the rapid development of elements of Roman culture both by the local upper classes and by immigrants either attracted by commercial possibilities or officially encouraged to settle.

=== North of the wall ===
Northwards a very different picture emerges. A large area of what is now southern Scotland as far as Lothian, and the Northumbrian coastal plain, lost its monumental building tradition of substantial timber roundhouses and earthwork enclosures. Very little late Roman pottery has been found there. The Romans may have cleared a zone of its population, as they are known to have done on the Rhine and for ten Roman miles beyond the Danube frontier. Some sites were still occupied; the fort of Burnswark Hill in Scotland, previously in ruins, was re-occupied about the time that the wall was built. Possibly this represents a short-lived Roman attempt to establish a co-operative authority on this main route further north to Caledonia. Within a few years, the fort was surrounded by Roman camps and bombarded by Roman missiles. It was finally abandoned by about 140.

Other sites may have been managed by native groups, probably for the management of livestock and possibly to supply Roman requirements. Pollen evidence suggests that the landscape immediately north of the wall remained generally open, without forest regeneration until the end of Roman rule. At Castle O'er an Iron Age hillfort was given an annexe and a network of ditched and banked boundaries. The sites at Pegswood Moor and St. George's Hospital, Morpeth, also show probable stock enclosures and droveways, far less substantial than the massive Iron Age sites in the area. The site at Huckhoe is the only one in this area to produce evidence of post-Hadrianic domestic residence (Roman coarse pottery, probably containers of high-prestige imported food, as late as the 3rd and possibly 4th centuries), and it may similarly have been mainly concerned with livestock management and delivery.

=== Limited contact across the wall ===
In general, and as with other Roman frontier lines, Roman coins and pottery did not move across the wall, and the wall seems to have been an effective barrier to trade. A few elite centres continued to import Roman goods, such as the post-160 samian found at Traprain Law. Ongoing exchange may have been managed at a few specific crossing points (and possibly at specific times of year). One such traditional point may be indicated by the concentration of Roman-period metal objects near Great Whittington, about 2 kilometres north along a Roman road from the Portgate on the wall. The coins, mostly silver rather than bronze and suggesting high-value transactions, indicate activity in the late 1st and early 2nd centuries, a diminution in the Antonine period when the garrison moved north to the Antonine Wall, and recovery in the later 2nd and early 3rd centuries.

== After Hadrian ==
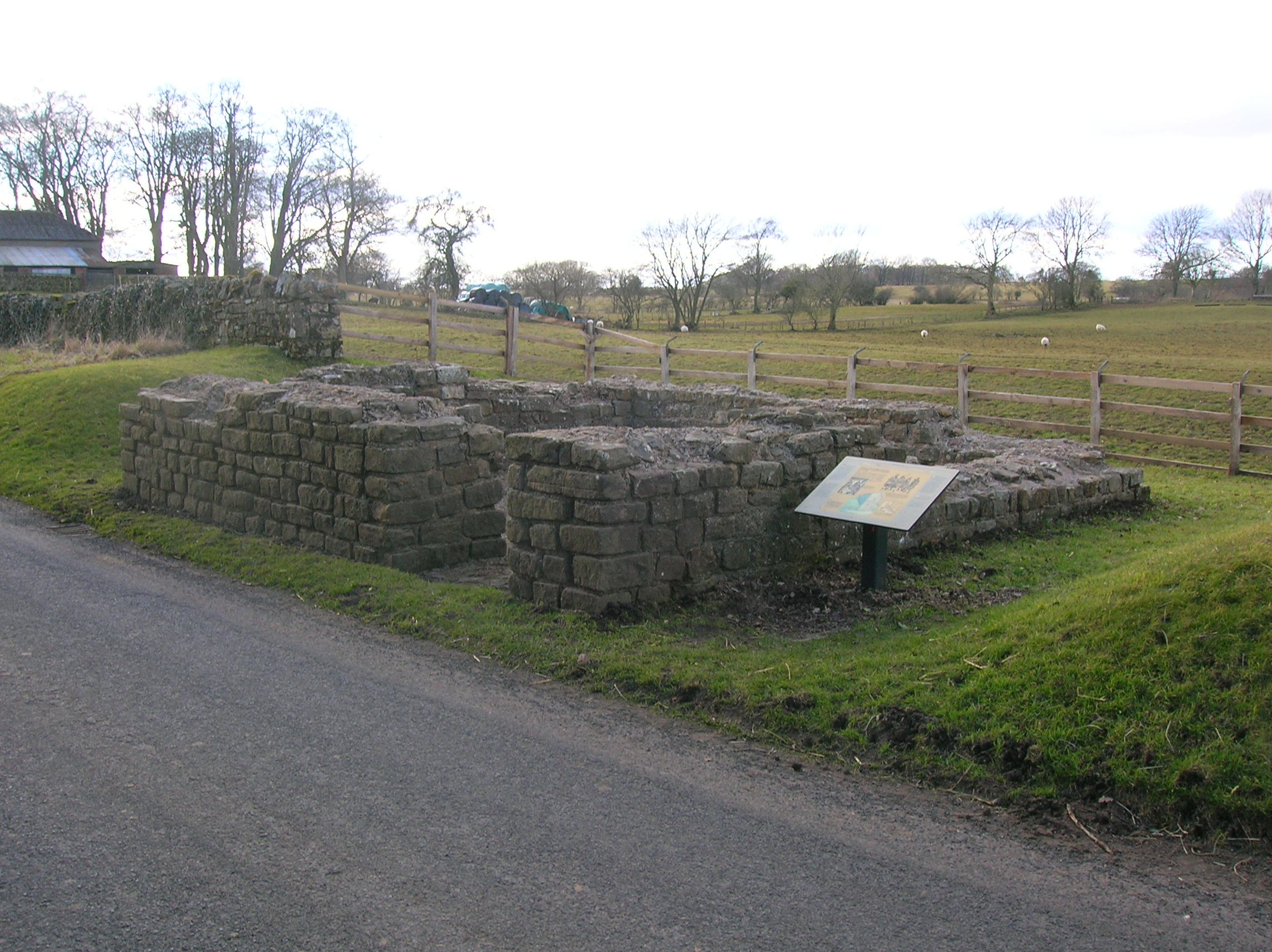
Leahill Turret in Cumbria, England, is a typical example of the intermediate turrets built into the wall between the milecastles.

After Hadrian's death in 138, Emperor Antoninus Pius left the wall occupied in a support role, essentially abandoning it. He began building the Antonine Wall about 160 kilometres (100 mi) north, across the isthmus running west-southwest to east-northeast. This turf wall ran 40 Roman miles, or about 60.8 km (37.8 mi), and had more forts than Hadrian's Wall. This area later became known as the Scottish Lowlands, sometimes referred to as the Central Belt or Central Lowlands.

Antoninus was unable to conquer the northern tribes, so when Marcus Aurelius became emperor, he abandoned the Antonine Wall and reoccupied Hadrian's Wall as the main defensive barrier in 164. In 208–211, Emperor Septimius Severus again tried to conquer Caledonia and temporarily reoccupied the Antonine Wall. The campaign ended inconclusively, and the Romans eventually withdrew to Hadrian's Wall. The early historian Bede, following Gildas, wrote (c. 730):

[the departing Romans] thinking that it might be some help to the allies [Britons], whom they were forced to abandon, constructed a strong stone wall from sea to sea, in a straight line between the towns that had been there built for fear of the enemy, where Severus also had formerly built a rampart.

— Bede, Historia Ecclesiastica gentis Anglorum, Book I Chapter 12

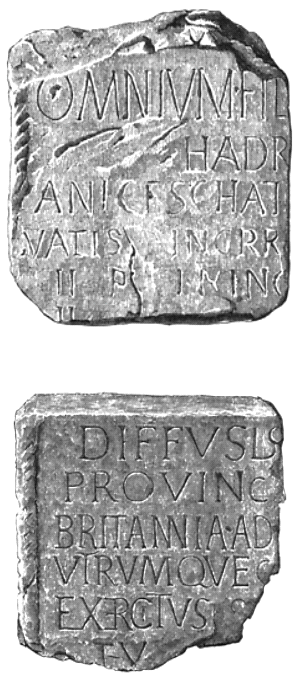
Two Roman inscriptions found built into Monkwearmouth–Jarrow Abbey (now St Paul's Church, Jarrow) in 1782, mentioning Hadrian above and the Province of Britannia below. They are possibly from a dedication slab or a victory monument at the very eastern end of the wall.

Bede obviously identifies Gildas's stone wall as Hadrian's Wall, and he appears to have believed that the Vallum was the rampart constructed by Severus. Many centuries would pass before just who built what became apparent. In the same passage, Bede describes Hadrian's Wall as follows: "It is eight feet in breadth, and twelve in height; and, as can be clearly seen to this day, ran straight from east to west." Bede by his own account lived his whole life at Jarrow, just across the River Tyne from the eastern end of the wall at Wallsend, so as he indicates, he would have been very familiar with the wall. Bede does not mention a walkway along the top of the wall. It might be thought likely that there was, but if so it no longer exists.

In the late 4th century, barbarian invasions, economic decline and military coups loosened the empire's hold on Britain. By 410, the estimated end of Roman rule in Britain, the Roman administration and its legions were gone, and Britain was left to look to its own defences and government. Archaeologists have revealed that some parts of the wall remained occupied well into the 5th century. It has been suggested that some forts continued to be garrisoned by local Britons under the control of a Coel Hen figure and former dux. Hadrian's Wall fell into ruin, and over the centuries the stone was reused in other local buildings. Enough survived in the 7th century for spolia from Hadrian's Wall (illustrated at right) to find its way into the construction of St Paul's Church in Monkwearmouth-Jarrow Abbey, where Bede was a monk. It was presumably incorporated before the setting of the church's dedication stone, still to be seen in the church, dated 23 April 685.

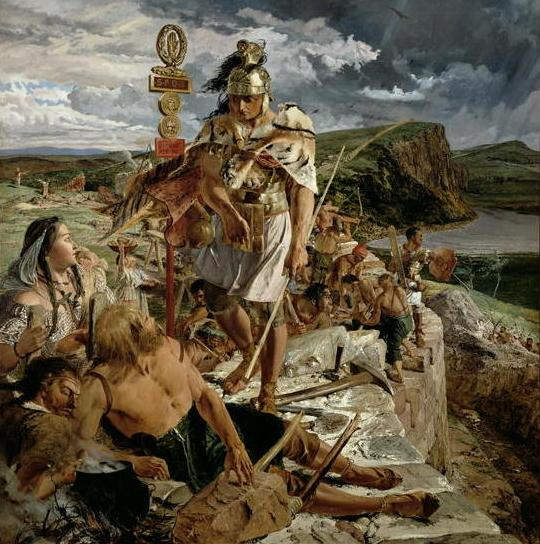
Building the Roman Wall by William Bell Scott, at Wallington Hall in Northumberland; the face of the centurion is that of the antiquarian John Clayton. The painting might imply that the wall was built by slaves, which it was not.

The wall fascinated John Speed, who published a set of maps of England and Wales by county at the start of the 17th century. He describes it as "the Picts Wall" (or "Pictes"; he uses both spellings). A map of Newecastle (sic), drawn in 1610 by William Matthew, describes it as "Severus' Wall", mistakenly giving it the name ascribed by Bede to the Vallum. Matthew's maps for Cumberland and Northumberland show the wall as a major feature and are ornamented with drawings of Roman finds together with (in the case of the Cumberland map) a cartouche in which he sets out a description of the wall.

=== Preservation by John Clayton ===
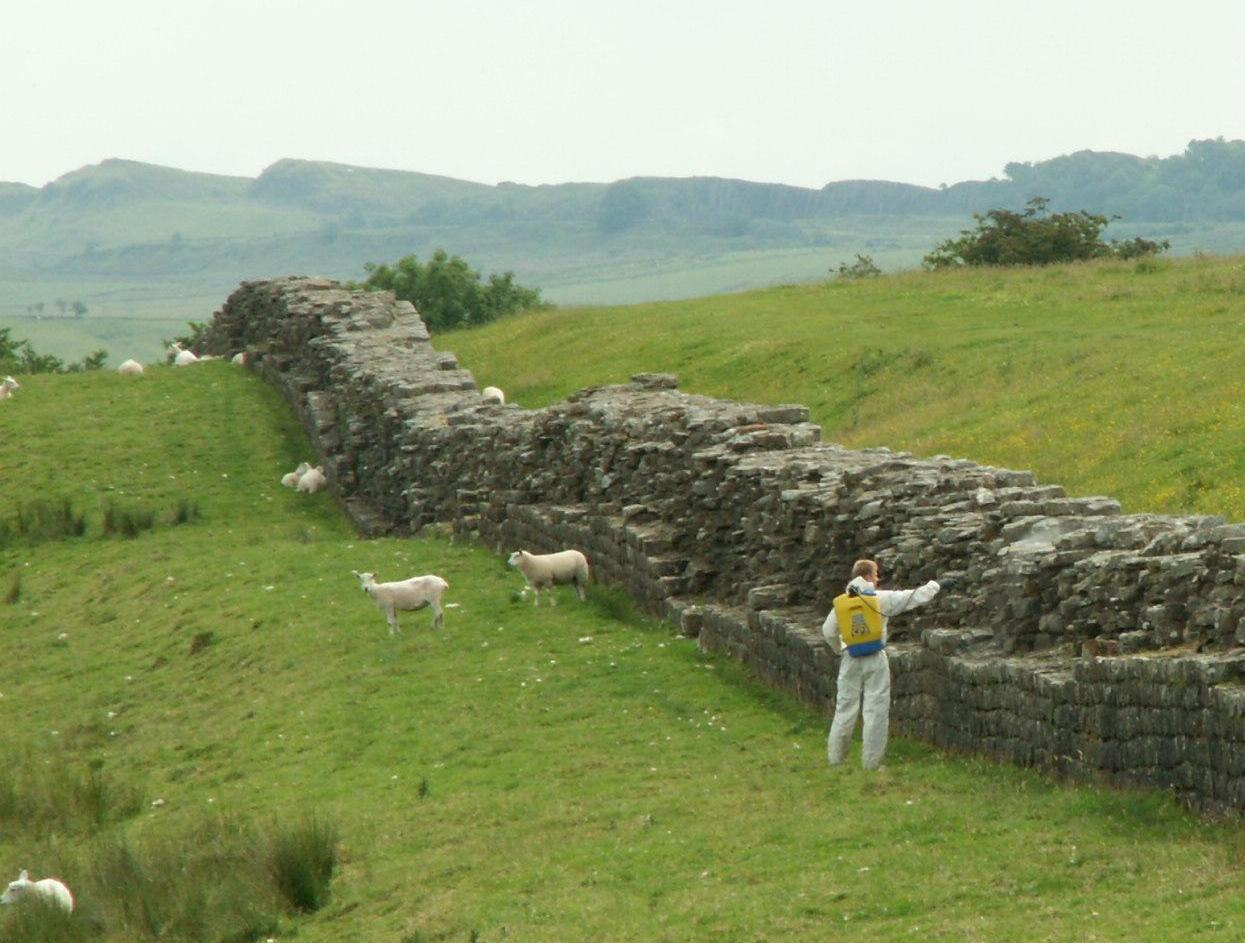
Hadrian's Wall near Birdoswald Fort, known to the Romans as Banna, with a man spraying weedkiller to reduce biological weathering to the stones.

Much of the wall has now disappeared. Long sections of it were used for roadbuilding in the 18th century, especially by General Wade to build a military road (most of which lies beneath the present day B6318 "Military Road") to move troops to crush the Jacobite rising of 1745. The preservation of much of what remains can be credited to the antiquarian John Clayton. He trained as a lawyer and became town clerk of Newcastle in the 1830s. He became enthusiastic about preserving the wall after inheriting Chesters from his father. To prevent farmers taking stones from the wall, he began buying some of the land on which the wall stood. In 1834, he started purchasing property around Steel Rigg near Crag Lough. Eventually, he controlled land from Brunton to Cawfields. This stretch included the sites of Chesters, Carrawburgh, Housesteads, and Vindolanda. Clayton carried out excavation at the fort at Cilurnum and at Housesteads, and he excavated some milecastles.

Clayton managed the farms he had acquired and succeeded in improving both the land and the livestock. He used the profits from his farms for restoration work. Workmen were employed to restore sections of the wall, generally up to a height of seven courses. The best example of the Clayton Wall is at Housesteads. After Clayton's death, the estate passed to relatives and was soon lost to gambling. Eventually, the National Trust began acquiring the land on which the wall stands. At Wallington Hall, near Morpeth, there is a painting by William Bell Scott, which shows a centurion supervising the building of the wall. The centurion has been given the face of John Clayton (above right).

=== Later discoveries ===
In 2021 workers for Northumbrian Water found a previously undiscovered 3-metre section of the wall while repairing a water main in central Newcastle upon Tyne. The company announced that the pipe would be "angled to leave a buffer around the excavated trench".

=== World Heritage Site ===
Hadrian's Wall was declared a World Heritage Site in 1987, and in 2005 it became part of the transnational "Frontiers of the Roman Empire" World Heritage Site, which also includes sites in Germany.

=== Tourism ===
Although Hadrian's Wall was declared a World Heritage Site in 1987, it remains unguarded, enabling visitors to climb and stand on the wall, although this is not encouraged, as it could damage the historic structure. On 13 March 2010, a public event Illuminating Hadrian's Wall took place, which saw the route of the wall lit with 500 beacons. On 31 August and 2 September 2012, there was a second illumination of the wall as a digital art installation called "Connecting Light", which was part of the London 2012 Festival. In 2018, the organisations which manage the Great Wall of China and Hadrian's Wall signed an agreement to collaborate for the growth of tourism and for historical and cultural understanding of the monuments.

=== Hadrian's Wall Path ===
In 2003, a National Trail footpath was opened that follows the line of the wall from Wallsend to Bowness-on-Solway. Because of the fragile landscape, walkers are asked to follow the path only in summer.

== Roman-period names ==
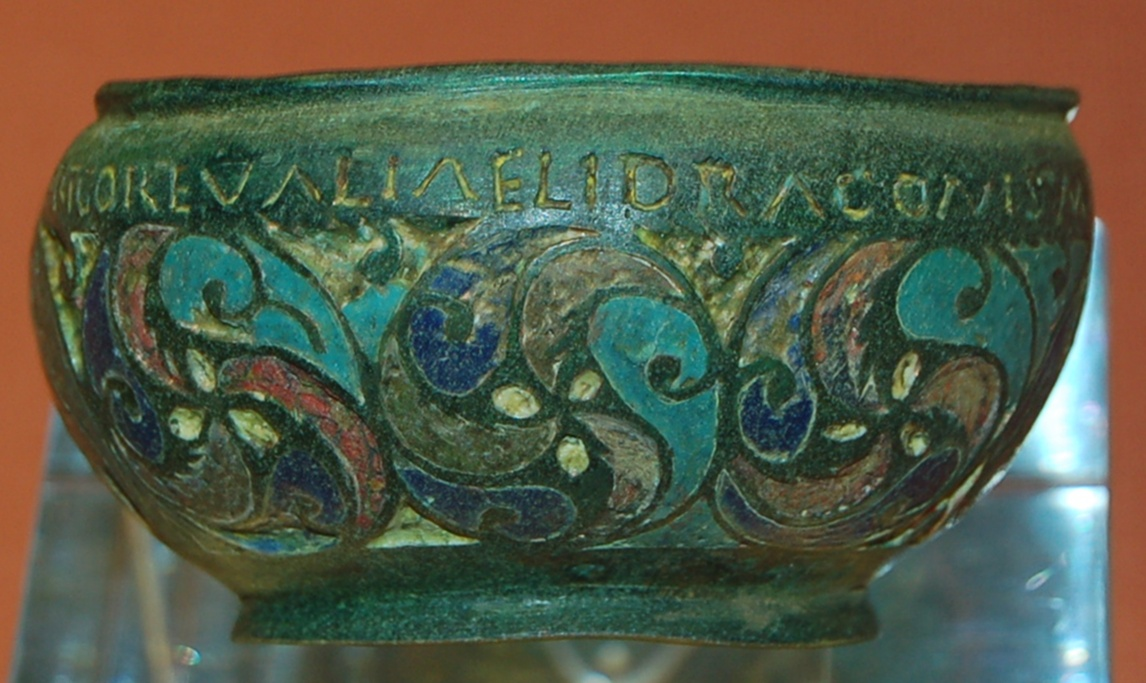
The Staffordshire Moorlands Pan, which may provide the ancient name of Hadrian's Wall (it reads in part VALI AELI, ie. the Wall of Hadrian, using his family name of Aelius)

Hadrian's Wall was known in the Roman period as the vallum (wall), and the discovery of the Staffordshire Moorlands Pan in Staffordshire in 2003 has thrown further light on its name. This copper alloy pan (trulla) from the 2nd century is inscribed with a series of four names of Roman forts along the western sector of the wall: MAIS [Bowness-on-Solway] COGGABATA [Drumburgh] VXELODVNVM [Stanwix] CAMBOGLANNA [Castlesteads]. This is followed by the words RIGORE VALI AELI DRACONIS. Hadrian's family name was Aelius, and the most likely reading of the inscription is Valli Aelii (genitive), Hadrian's Wall, suggesting that the wall was called by the same name by contemporaries. However, another possibility is that it refers to the personal name Aelius Draco.

Other bronze vessels that are very similar to the Staffordshire Moorlands Pan are the Rudge Cup, found in Wiltshire in 1725; the Amiens Skillet, found in Amiens in northern France in 1949; and the Berlanga Cup, found in Berlanga de Duero in Castile in 2025. They also bear the Latin names of Hadrian's Wall forts round their rims, beneath which are representations of a turreted or battlemented wall, thought to depict Hadrian's Wall.

These vessels show that, by their quality and the distance from the Wall that they were found, they were valued as souvenirs by their owners who might have been veterans who served in one of the many foreign auxiliary units on the wall.

=== Forts ===
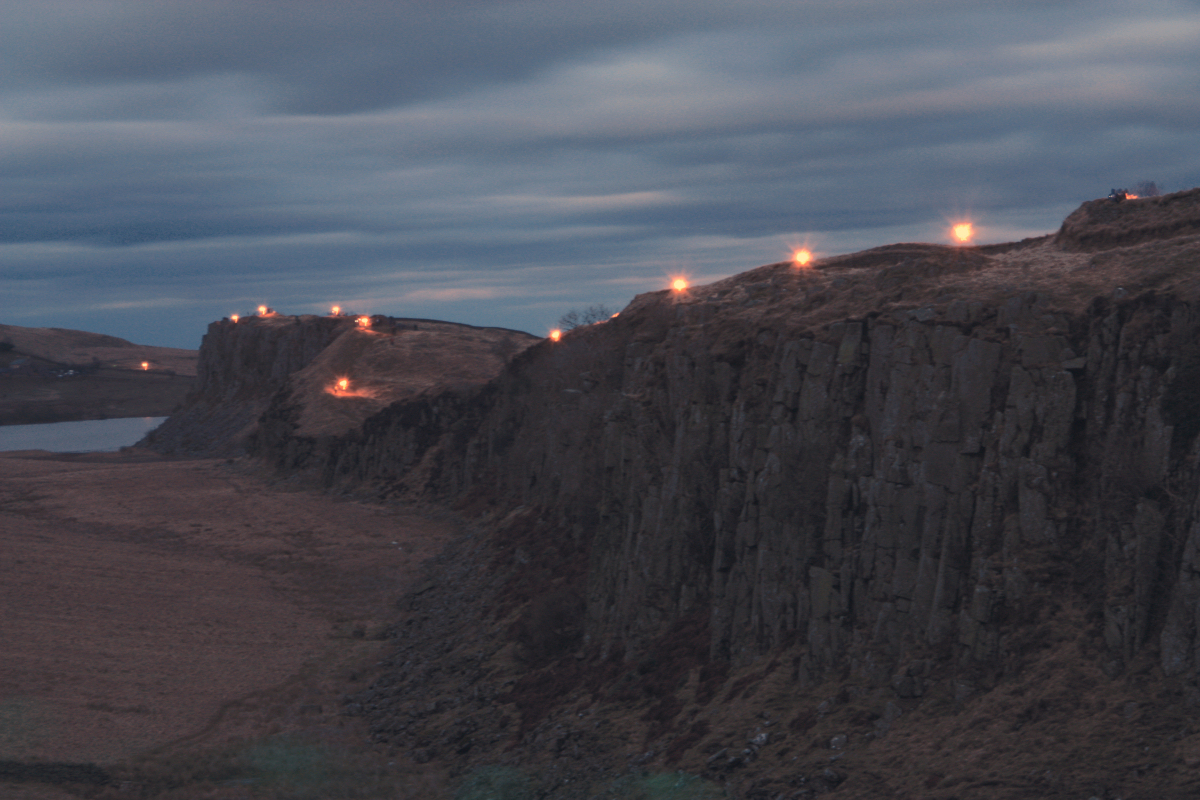
In March 2010, to commemorate the 1600th anniversary of the end of Roman rule in Britain, a series of 500 beacons were successively lit along the length of Hadrian's Wall.

The Latin and Romano-Celtic names of all of the Hadrian's Wall forts are known, from the Notitia Dignitatum and other evidence such as inscriptions. They are listed here from east to west, in their Latin and modern English names:

- Segedunum (Wallsend)
- Pons Aelius (Newcastle upon Tyne)
- Condercum (Benwell Hill)
- Vindobala (Rudchester)
- Hunnum (Halton Chesters)
- Cilurnum (Chesters aka Walwick Chesters)
- Procolita (Carrawburgh)
- Vercovicium (Housesteads)
- Aesica (Great Chesters)
- Magnis (Carvoran)
- Banna (Birdoswald)
- Camboglanna (Castlesteads)
- Uxelodunum (Stanwix. Also known as Petriana)
- Aballava (Burgh-by-Sands)
- Coggabata (Drumburgh)
- Mais (Bowness-on-Solway)

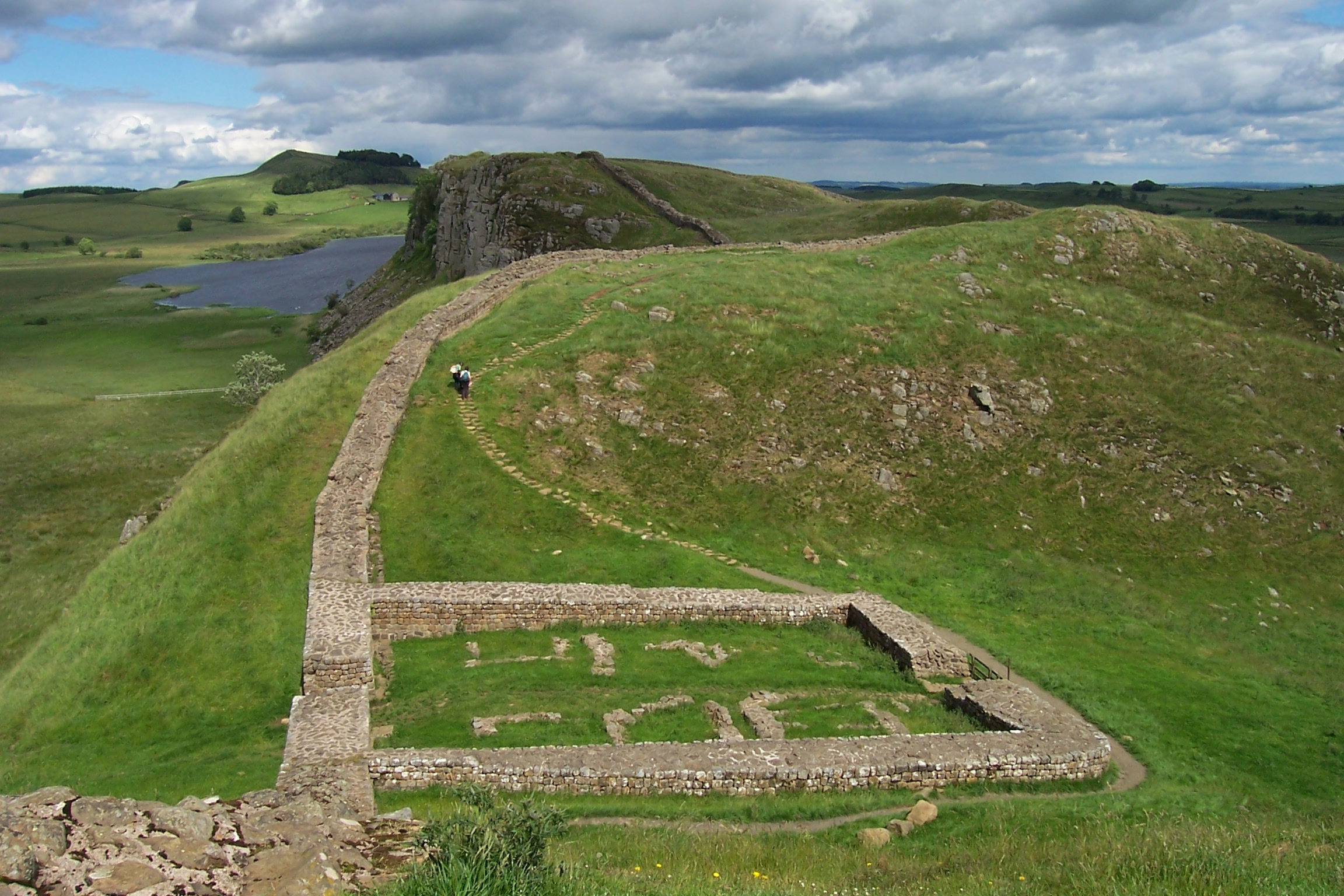
The remains of Castle Nick, Milecastle 39, near Steel Rigg, between Housesteads and The Sill Visitor Centre for the Northumberland National Park at Once Brewed

Turrets on the wall include:

- Leahill Turret
- Denton Hall Turret

Outpost forts beyond the wall include:

- Habitancum (Risingham)
- Bremenium (High Rochester)
- Fanum Cocidi (Bewcastle) (north of Birdoswald)
- Ad Fines (Chew Green)

Supply forts behind the wall include:

- Alauna (Maryport)
- Arbeia (South Shields)
- Coria (Corbridge)
- Epiacum (Whitley Castle near Alston)
- Vindolanda (Little Chesters or Chesterholm)
- Vindomora (Ebchester)

== In popular culture ==
=== Books ===
- The Eagle of the Ninth is a children's novel by Rosemary Sutcliff, published in 1954. It tells the story of a young Roman officer venturing north beyond Hadrian's Wall in search of the missing Eagle standard of the lost Ninth Legion. It was inspired by the bronze Silchester eagle found in 1866. The book itself inspired the 2011 film The Eagle, among other adaptations.
- English author Rudyard Kipling contributed to the popular image of the "Great Pict Wall" in his short stories about Parnesius, a Roman legionary who defended the wall against the Picts. These stories are part of the Puck of Pook's Hill anthology, published in 1906.
- French author Marguerite Yourcenar wrote the fictional memoirs of the emperor Hadrian : Mémoires d'Hadrien. The military career of the emperor has some importance in the book.
- American author George R. R. Martin has acknowledged that Hadrian's Wall was the inspiration for the Wall in his best-selling series A Song of Ice and Fire, dramatized in the fantasy TV series Game of Thrones, in which the wall is also in the north of its country and stretches from coast to coast.
- In M. J. Trow's fictional Britannia series, Hadrian's Wall is the central location, and Coel Hen and Padarn Beisrudd are portrayed as limitanei (frontier soldiers).

=== Films ===
- Hadrian's Wall features as a major focal point of the 2004 film King Arthur, in which one of its primary gates is opened for the first time since its construction to allow Arthur and his knights passage into the north for their quest. The climactic Battle of Badon between the Britons led by Arthur and his knights, and the Saxons led by Cerdic and his son Cynric, is set just inside the wall.

=== Poetry ===
- The English poet W. H. Auden wrote a script for a BBC radio documentary called Hadrian's Wall, which was broadcast on the BBC's north-eastern Regional Programme in 1937. Auden later published a poem from the script, "Roman Wall Blues", in his book Another Time. The poem is a brief monologue spoken in the voice of a lonely Roman soldier stationed at the wall.

== Gallery ==
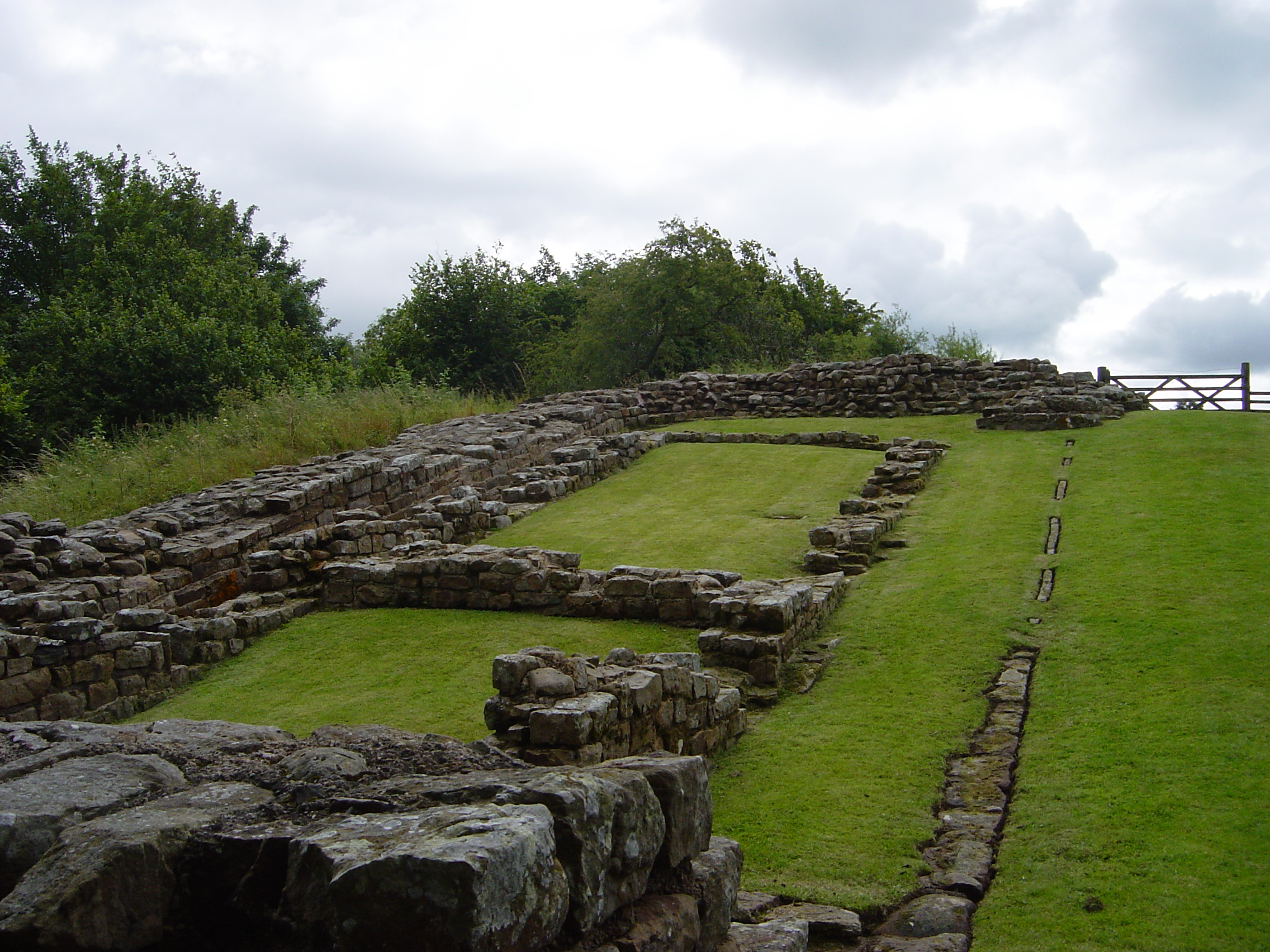
Poltross Burn, Milecastle 48, which was built on a steep slope

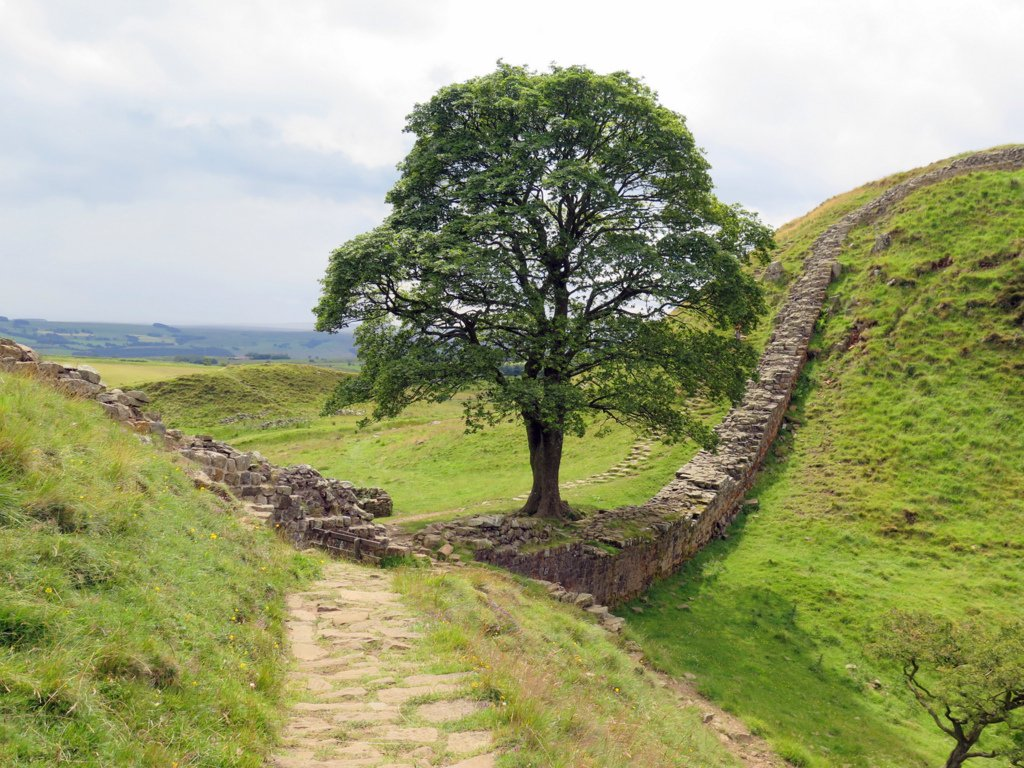
The Sycamore Gap tree, which was felled in 2023 in an act of vandalism (also known as the "Robin Hood Tree", because it appeared in the film Robin Hood: Prince of Thieves)

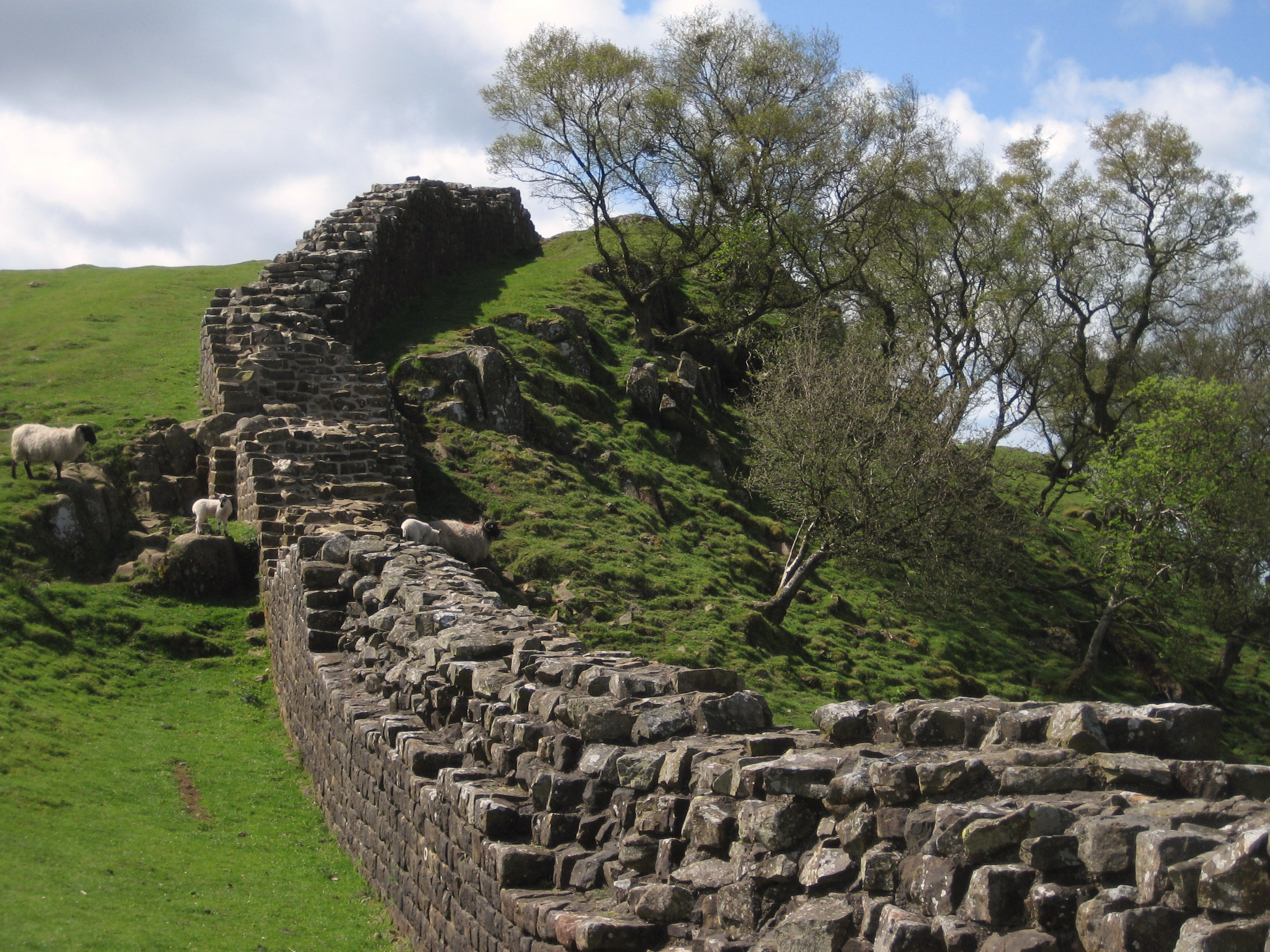
Hadrian's Wall with sheep

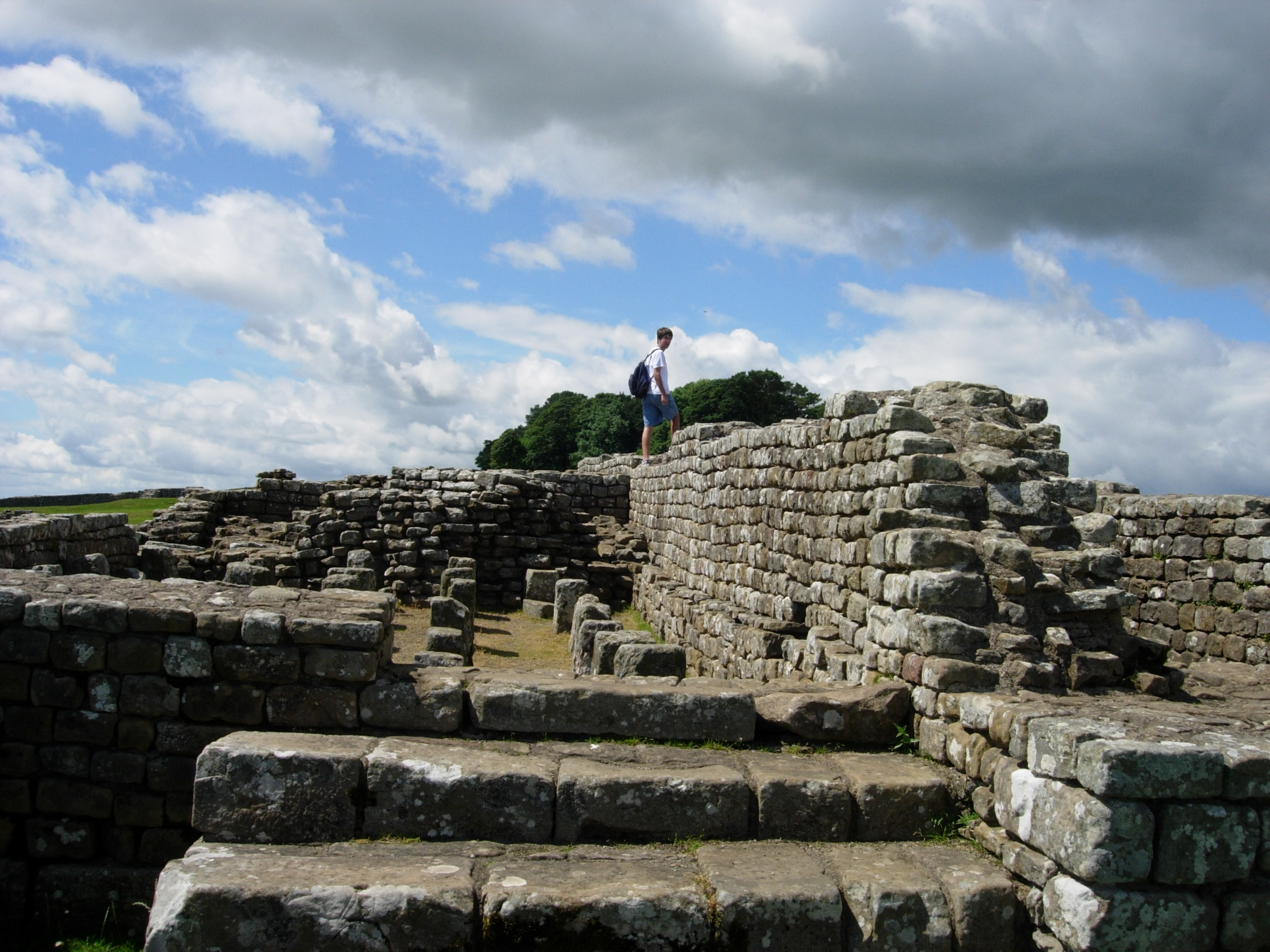
The remains of the southern granary at Housesteads, showing under-floor pillars to assist ventilation

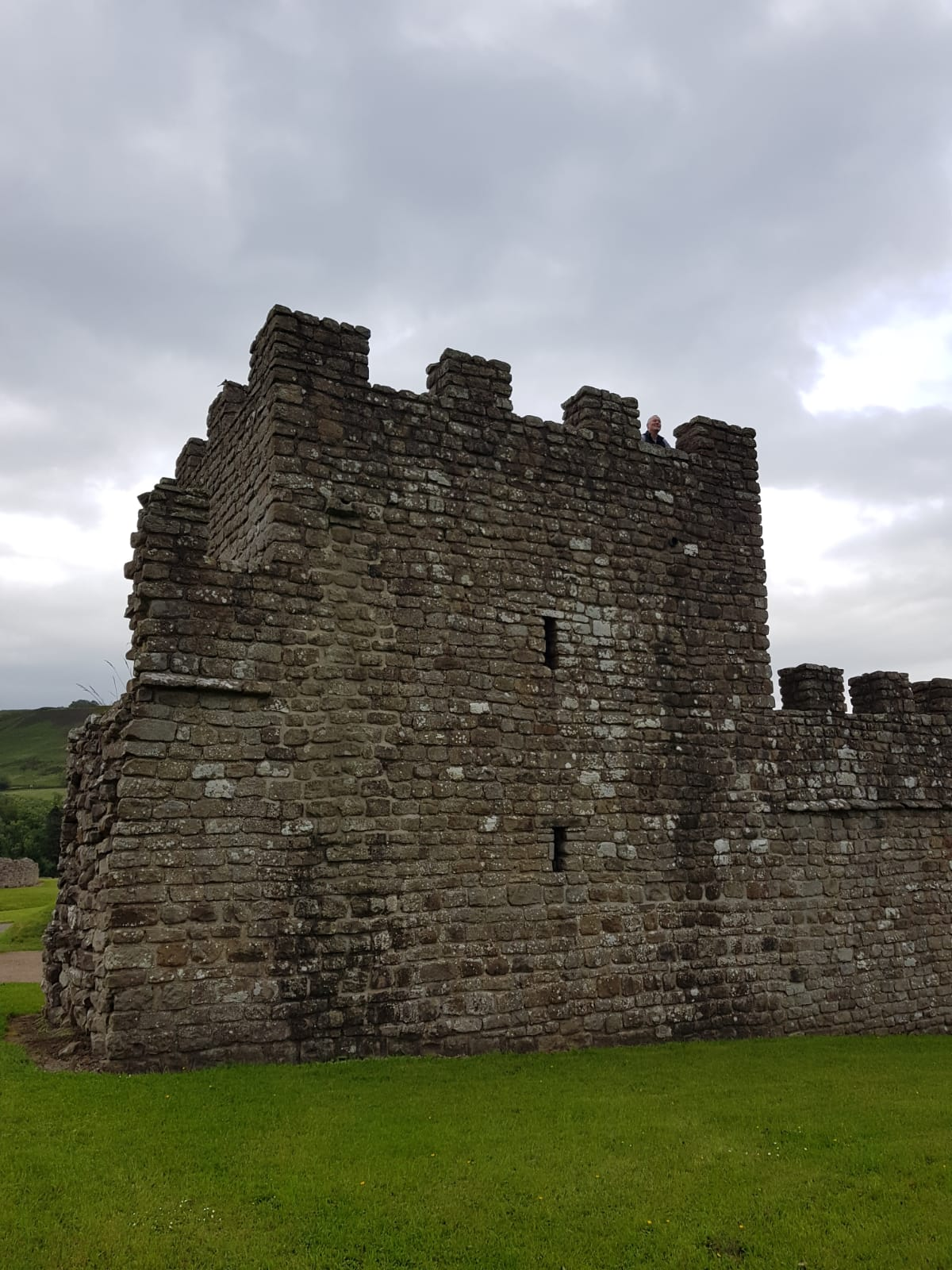
A modern reconstruction of a short segment of Hadrian's Wall at Vindolanda

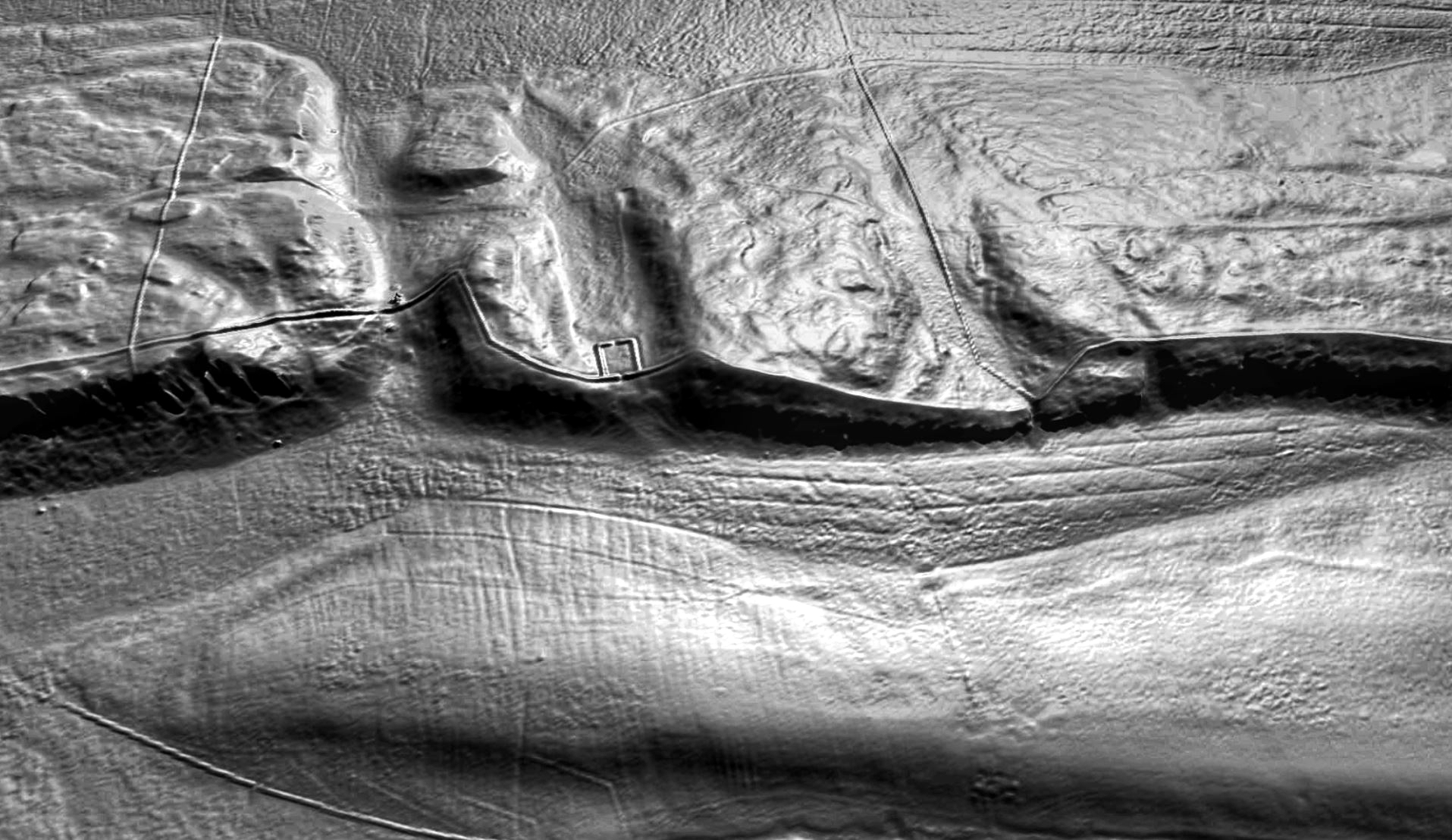
A lidar view of the section of Hadrian's Wall that includes Milecastle 39 and the Sycamore Gap

== See also ==
- Danevirke
- English Heritage properties
- Gask Ridge
- Hadrianic Society
- History of Cumbria
- History of Northumberland
- History of Scotland
- List of walls
- Offa's Dyke
- Scots' Dike
