= List of English Heritage properties =

English Heritage is a registered charity that manages the National Heritage Collection. This comprises over 400 of England's historic buildings, monuments, and sites spanning more than 5,000 years of history. It has direct ownership over some historic sites and also liaises with private owners of sites that are managed under guardianship arrangements.

The following is a list of English Heritage properties containing links for any stately home, historic house, castle, abbey, museum or other property in the care of English Heritage.

== Bedfordshire ==
Name	Type	Date	Condition	Image	Notes
Bushmead Priory	Priory	1185–1195	Part complete		The Priory Church of Saint Mary, Bushmead, commonly called Bushmead Priory, was a monastic foundation for Augustinian Canons, located at Bushmead in the County of Bedfordshire in England.
De Grey Mausoleum	Mausoleum	1614	Complete		The de Grey Mausoleum in Flitton, Bedfordshire, England, is one of the largest sepulchral chapels in the country.
Houghton House	Country House	1615	Ruins		Houghton House is a ruined house located near Houghton Conquest in Bedfordshire, on the ridge just north of Ampthill, and about 8 miles south of Bedford. The house was built for the writer, translator, and literary patron Mary Sidney Herbert, Dowager Countess of Pembroke.
Wrest Park House and Gardens	Country House	1834–1839	Complete		Wrest Park is a country estate located near Silsoe, Bedfordshire, England. It comprises Wrest Park, a Grade I listed country house, and Wrest Park Gardens, also Grade I listed, formal gardens surrounding the mansion.

== Berkshire ==
Name	Type	Date	Condition	Image	Notes
Donnington Castle	Castle	1386	Ruins		Donnington Castle is a ruined medieval castle, situated in the small village of Donnington, just north of the town of Newbury. It was destroyed in the English Civil War in 1646.

== Bristol ==
Name	Type	Date	Condition	Image	Notes
Temple Church	Church	1390	Ruins		A ruined church building in central Bristol, which was founded in the mid-12th century by Robert of Gloucester and the Knights Templar. It served as the site for the famous exorcism of George Lukins conducted by Methodist and Anglican clergymen. It was bombed in the Second World War and largely destroyed.

== Cambridgeshire ==
Name	Type	Date	Condition	Image	Notes
Denny Abbey and Farmland Museum	Abbey or Priory	1159	Parts survive		A former abbey near Waterbeach, north of Cambridge. A group of Benedictine monks, governed from Ely, moved here in the 1150s. They built a church, Denny Priory, which opened in 1159. The crossing and transepts are the only parts of the original Priory that remain today. In 1169, the monks returned to Ely and the site was handed to the Knights Templar.
Duxford Chapel	Chapel	1337	Complete		A chapel that was once part of the Hospital of St. John at Duxford, in Cambridgeshire, England, the hospital since demolished. Built using flint rubble for the walls and limestone for the doorways and windows.
Isleham Priory Church	Church	1090	Complete		A Norman church, Located in Isleham, and part of the former St Margaret's Benedictine Alien Priory. Later converted into a barn, but it remains in an unaltered state.
Longthorpe Tower	Fortified manor house	1310	Only tower remains		A fourteenth-century, three-storey tower, originally part of a fortified manor house. Situated in the village of Longthorpe, now a residential area of Peterborough.

== Cheshire ==
Name	Type	Date	Condition	Image	Notes
Beeston Castle	Castle	1220	Ruins		A former Royal castle in Beeston, perched above the Cheshire Plain. Built by Ranulf de Blondeville, 6th Earl of Chester, on his return from the Crusades. In 1237, Henry III took over the ownership of Beeston, and it was kept in good repair until the 16th century. The castle was slighted in 1646. During the 18th century the site was used as a quarry.
Chester Castle: Agricola Tower and Castle Walls	Castle	1070	Partly complete		The castle overlooks the River Dee. In the castle complex are the remaining parts of the medieval castle together with the neoclassical buildings designed by Thomas Harrison which were built between 1788 and 1813. Parts of the neoclassical buildings are used today as Crown Courts and as a military museum.
Chester Roman Amphitheatre	Amphitheatre	1st century	Ruins		Ruins of a large Roman stone amphitheatre. Today, only the northern half of the structure is exposed; the southern half is covered by buildings. The amphitheatre is the largest so far uncovered in Britain, and dates from the 1st century, when the Roman fort of Deva Victrix was founded. Rediscovered in 1929.
Sandbach Crosses	Standing cross	9th century	Complete		Two Anglo-Saxon stone crosses now erected in the market place in the town of Sandbach. They are unusually large and elaborate examples of the type. They depict religious scenes, doll-like heads and beasts in panels, together with vine-scrolls, course interlace patterns and some dragons.

== Cornwall ==
Name	Type	Date	Condition	Image	Notes
Ballowall Barrow	Megalithic tomb	Neolithic	Remains		A prehistoric funerary cairn (chambered tomb) situated on the cliff top at Ballowall Common, near St Just. It was first excavated in 1878 by William Copeland Borlase when it was discovered under mining debris. The site today is a confused mix of original and reconstructions introduced by Borlase.
Carn Euny Ancient Village	Village and Fogou	Iron Age	Remains		A Romano-British village near Sancreed, on the Penwith peninsula, with considerable evidence of Iron Age settlement as well. Carn Euny is best known for the well-preserved state of the large fogou, an underground passageway, which is more than 20m long.
Chysauster Ancient Village	Village	Iron Age	Remains		A Romano-British village of courtyard houses, believed to have been constructed and occupied between 100 BC and 400 AD; it was primarily agricultural and unfortified and probably occupied by members of the Dumnonii tribe. The village included eight stone dwellings, arranged in pairs along a street, each with its own garden plot.
Dupath Well	Wellhouse	1510	Complete		A wellhouse constructed over a local spring. Built of Cornish granite ashlar, it was probably built by the Augustinian canons of the nearby priory of St Germans, to whom the site belonged.
Halliggye Fogou	Fogou	Iron Age	Remains		Located on the Trelowarren estate near Helston, it consists of a long narrow tunnel leading to three sectioned chambers, and a window-like entrance which was dug in Victorian times by supposed treasure hunters. It is the largest and best preserved of several mysterious tunnels associated with Cornish Iron Age settlements.
Hurlers Stone Circles	Stone circle	Neolithic	Remains		A group of three stone circles. The site is on the eastern flank of Bodmin Moor. The circles have diameters of 35m, 42m and 33m. The two outer stone circles are circular, the middle and largest stone circle, however, is slightly elliptical.
King Doniert's Stone	Standing Cross	9th century	Remains		Consists of two pieces of a decorated 9th-century cross. The inscription is believed to commemorate Dungarth, King of Cornwall who died around 875. The site also includes an underground passage and chamber.
Launceston Castle	Castle	11th century	Ruins		A Norman motte and bailey castle raised by Robert, Count of Mortain, half-brother of William the Conqueror. It became the administrative headquarters for the powerful Earls of Cornwall. The castle remained with little development, apart from an inner keep added in the 12th century. During the 13th century, Richard, Earl of Cornwall, a younger brother of Henry III began to rebuild the castle in stone.
Pendennis Castle	Device fort	1539	Partly complete		One of Henry VIII's Device Forts. Built to guard the entrance to the River Fal on its west bank, near Falmouth. St Mawes Castle is its opposite number on the east bank and they were built to defend Carrick Roads from the French and Spanish threats of future attack. The castle comprises a simple round tower and gate enclosed by a lower curtain wall.
Penhallam	Manor House	12th century	Ruins		The site of a former medieval manor house surrounded by a protective moat, abandoned during the mid-14th century. Penhallam is one of only four such moated medieval manor sites in Cornwall and it consists of a quadrangle of buildings around a central courtyard.
Restormel Castle	Castle	12th century	Ruins		Situated on the River Fowey near Lostwithiel, it is one of the four chief Norman castles of Cornwall. The castle is notable for its perfectly circular design. Although once a luxurious residence to the Earl of Cornwall, the castle became ruined in the years after.
St Breock Downs Monolith	Monolith	Neolithic	Remains		A 5m-high prehistoric standing stone located near St Breock.
St Catherine's Castle	Device fort	1530s	Remains		A small fort commissioned by Henry VIII to protect Fowey Harbour. A twin battery of 64-pounder guns was added on a lower terrace in 1855. One emplacement was modified in the Second World War to mount a 4.7" naval gun, but was later removed to restore the Victorian gun races.
St Mawes Castle	Device fort	1540s	Remains		St Mawes Castle and its larger sister castle, Pendennis, were built as part of a defensive chain of fortresses by Henry VIII to protect the south coast of Cornwall.
Tintagel Castle	Castle	13th century	Ruins		A medieval fortification located on the peninsula of Tintagel Island. It saw settlement during the early medieval period, when it was probably one of the seasonal residences of the regional king of Dumnonia. After Cornwall had been subsumed into the kingdom of England, a castle was built on the site by Richard, Earl of Cornwall.
Tregiffian Burial Chamber	Megalithic tomb	Neolithic	Remains		A Neolithic or early Bronze Age chambered tomb, comprising an entrance passage, lined with stone slabs, leading to a central chamber, located near Lamorna in west Cornwall.
Trethevy Quoit	Megalithic tomb	Neolithic	Remains		A well-preserved megalithic tomb located near St Cleer. It is known locally as "the giant's house" and stands 2.7m high, and consists of five standing stones capped by a large slab.

== Cumbria ==
Name	Type	Date	Condition	Image	Notes
Ambleside Roman Fort	Roman fort	1st or 2nd century AD	Ruins		Beside a Roman road and is a large rectangular enclosure, with towers at each corner, and was enclosed by a thick wall of roughly coursed stone. A clay ramp backed the wall from the inside, and a ditch ran around the outside.
Bow Bridge	Bridge	1500s	Complete		Sited near Furness Abbey and mill. Made of local red sandstone stone and crosses Mill Beck. After the Dissolution this mill fell into disuse and the bridge saw little traffic. It has been a Scheduled monument since 1949.
Brough Castle	Castle	1092	Ruins		Built by William Rufus within the old Roman fort of Verterae to protect a key route through the Pennine Mountains. The initial motte and bailey castle was attacked and destroyed by the Scots in 1174 during the Great Revolt against Henry II. Rebuilt after the war, a keep was constructed and the rest of the castle converted to stone.
Brougham Castle	Castle	early 13th century	Ruins		Founded by Robert I de Vieuxpont at the confluence of the rivers, Eamont and Lowther, which had been chosen by the Romans for a Roman fort called Brocavum. It consisted of a stone keep, with an enclosure protected by an earthen bank and a wooden palisade. A stone curtain wall replaced the palisade in 1296.
Carlisle Castle	Castle	1093	Remains restored		Built to keep the northern border of England secured against the threat of invasion from Scotland. Henry I of England ordered a stone castle to be constructed on the site. Thus a keep and city walls were constructed between 1122 and 1135. Parts of the castle were then demolished for use as raw materials in the 19th century.
Castlerigg Stone Circle	Stone circle	Late Neolithic	Remains		Built from glacial erratic boulders composed of volcanic rock. The stones are set in a flattened circle, measuring 32.6 m at its widest and 29.5 m (97 ft) at its narrowest. The heaviest stone has been estimated to weigh around 16 tons and the tallest stone measures approximately 2.3m high.
Clifton Hall	Fortified manor house	c 1400	Ruins		Constructed and used by the Wybergh family until the 19th century. Built around a central hall, in 1500 a three-storey stone pele tower was added. In the early 19th century most of Clifton Hall was demolished for a farmhouse and only the pele tower survived.
Countess Pillar	Monument	1656	Complete		The square top of the stone pillar has sundials on its sides. It was erected by Lady Anne Clifford to mark the place where she said goodbye for the last time to her mother, Margaret Clifford, Countess of Cumberland.
Furness Abbey	Abbey	1123	Ruins		Founded by Stephen, Count of Boulogne and was built originally for the Order of Savigny. Passed in 1147 to the Cistercians, who enlarged and rebuilt the original ornate church. Was once the second-wealthiest and most powerful Cistercian monastery in the country. The majority of the current ruins date from the 12th and 13th centuries.
Hadrian's Wall: Banks East Turret	Turret	AD 122	Restored remains		Excavations in 1933 uncovered remains of the demolished Turf Wall abutting the turret's east wall. The turret was in use from around the early 2nd century until at least the end of the 3rd century. The walls have been consolidated and restored
Hadrian's Wall: Birdoswald Roman Fort	Roman fort	AD 112	Remains		1 of the best preserved of the 16 forts along the Wall. On a commanding position on a triangular spur of land bounded by cliffs to the south and east overlooking a broad meander of the River Irthing. In Roman times, the fort was known as Banna ("horn" in Celtic) and used up to AD 400.
Hadrian's Wall: Hare Hill	Wall	AD 122	Remains		The tallest remaining stretch of Hadrian's Wall, standing up to three metres high. It probably survived because it was later built into the wall of a medieval structure. In the 19th century it was substantially rebuilt, using Roman masonry which was probably retrieved from the surrounding area.
Hadrian's Wall: Harrows Scar Milecastle and Wall	Milecastle and Wall	AD 122	Remains		West of the gorge of the River Irthing where the Wall was carried over the river by the bridge at Willowford. The scar or cliff and hence the milecastle are named after an ancient tenement called The Harrows. It is 19.8 metres by 22.9 metres.
Hadrian's Wall: Poltross Burn Milecastle	Milecastle	AD 122	Remains		Near the village of Gilsland in Cumbria where it was historically known as "The King's Stables", owing to the well-preserved interior walls. Unusually a substantial section of stone stairs has survived within the milecastle. The two turrets associated with this milecastle have also survived as above-ground masonry.
Hadrian's Wall: Leahill Turret and Piper Sike Turret	Turret	AD 122	Remains		2 of the lookout towers located between the milecastles. An excavation in 1927 found Lanercost Road passed over the Leahill. The road was rerouted to clear the turret. The Wall in this sector was first built of turf, but was later replaced in stone.
Hadrian's Wall: Pike Hill Signal Tower	Signal Tower	AD 122	Remains		A signal station that was built on high ground overlooking the line of the Roman Stanegate road. The tower was built prior to either the turf or stone walls that exist nearby. A square structure measuring around 6 metres (20 feet) on each side.
Hadrian's Wall: Willowford Wall, Turrets and Bridge	Wall, Turrets and Bridge	AD 122	Remains		A 914-metre stretch of Wall, including two turrets and bridge remains beside the River Irthing. Linked by a bridge to Birdoswald Roman Fort. The bridge was remodelled at least twice, being widened to take a road in the late 2nd or early 3rd century AD.
Hardknott Roman Fort	Roman fort	120 - 138	Remains		The Roman fort of Mediobogdum was built on a rocky spur, the initial Roman garrison here was a detachment of 500 infantry of the Cohors IV Delmatarum from the Dalmatian coast. It is square with rounded corners and abandoned during the mid-2nd century.
King Arthur's Round Table	Henge	Neolithic	Remains		90 metres in diameter. The enclosed area is about 50 metres across; the ditch has a maximum width of 16 ms; the berm 7 ms; and the bank 13 ms. There appears to have been two original entrances, but only the south-east entrance survives as the northwest entrance has been mostly destroyed by the B5320 road, crossing over the northern part.
Lanercost Priory	Priory	ca 1169	Ruins		Founded by Robert de Vaux to house Augustinian canons. The church building dates from the late 13th century, though there is evidence of earlier work. The Priory buildings were constructed, at least in part, from stones derived from Hadrian's Wall. Edward I made several visits to the priory, including in 1280 he visited with Queen Eleanor.
Mayburgh Henge	Henge	Neolithic	Remains		A single circular bank possibly built using cobble stones from nearby rivers. It is estimated that the bank contains c20,000 tons of stones. The bank is up to 15 feet (4.6 metres) high, and 50 metres across its base with a diameter of around 383 feet (117 metres). Contained within it is a single monolith 9 feet (2.7 metres) high. It may have had a stone circle.
Penrith Castle	Castle	1399 - 1470	Ruins		Built as a defence against Scottish raids, by Richard Neville, Earl of Salisbury. From 1441 and until 1444, Salisbury, who was then Warden of the West March, was sub-letting the lordship of Penrith to Lumley, bishop of Carlisle.
Piel Castle	Castle	1327	Ruins		On Piel Island, built by John Cockerham, the Abbot of nearby Furness Abbey, to oversee the trade through the local harbour and to protect against Scottish raids. It had a keep with an inner and outer bailey.
Ravenglass Roman Bath House	Bath House	AD 130	Remains		Linked to a 2nd-century Roman fort and naval base (known as Glannoventa). The fort's defences were originally of turf and timber, although in the early 3rd century a stone wall was constructed. It was used from AD 130 until the end of the 4th century.
Shap Abbey	Abbey	1199	Remains		The monastic community of the Premonstratensian order of Canons regular, was founded on another site 20 miles south near Kendal in 1190, but it moved to the present site, then called 'Hepp', in 1199. It was closed in 1540 and then sold to the Governor of Carlisle. Most of the abbey buildings have been demolished.
Stott Park Bobbin Mill	Factory	1835	Complete		It was one of over 65 such buildings in the Lake District, which provided wooden bobbins to the weaving and spinning industry primarily in Lancashire and Yorkshire.
Wetheral Priory Gatehouse	Gatehouse	15th century	Complete		The priory was founded at the start of the 12th century and the gatehouse controlled the entrance to its outer courtyard. When the priory was dissolved in 1538, the red sandstone gatehouse and a nearby stretch of wall were the only parts to survive. It has a porters' lodge on the ground floor and two domestic chambers on the upper floors.

== Derbyshire ==
Name	Type	Date	Condition	Image	Notes
Arbor Low Stone Circle and Gib Hill Barrow	Henge and Tumulus	Both Neolithic	Remains		Arbor Low is a stone circle (50 large limestone blocks) surrounded by massive earthworks and a ditch. While 300m away is Gib hill, an oval barrow with an Early Bronze Age round barrow superimposed at one end.
Bolsover Castle	Castle	1612–1617	Complete		Built on the earthworks and ruins of the 12th-century medieval castle. It was built by Sir Charles Cavendish and designed by Robert Smythson. It was owned by the Earls and Dukes of Portland. It is a Grade I listed building and a Scheduled Ancient Monument.
Bolsover Cundy House	Water supply	17th century	Complete		A conduit house that was used to supply water to the nearby Bolsover Castle. A brick water tank, which still collects water and a solid stone vaulted roof.
Hardwick Hall	Country House	1590–1597	Complete		An Elizabethan prodigy house. Built for Bess of Hardwick and designed by the architect Robert Smythson. After ownership for centuries by the Cavendish family and then the line of the Earl of Devonshire and the Duke of Devonshire. It has been restored.
Hob Hurst's House	Tumulus	Bronze Age	Remains		A barrow which is unusually rectangular and originally made with 13 stones, only five remain today. It has a square central mound, ditch and outer bank.
Nine Ladies Stone Circle	Stone circle	Bronze Age	Remains		It consists of ten millstone grit stones, although for several centuries one of these was buried, providing the impression that there had been nine stones. A single monolith, the King Stone, stands to the south-west of the circle.
Peveril Castle	Castle	11th-century	Ruins		It was founded by William Peveril, he was granted the new castle at Nottingham by William the Conqueror, who was in the process of subduing the Midlands and northern England. The castle, curtain walls and fragmentary foundations survive.
Sutton Scarsdale Hall	Country House	1724–1729	Ruins		Nicholas Leke, 4th Earl of Scarsdale commissioned an architect Francis Smith, to develop a Georgian mansion with gardens, using parts of the existing structure on the site. It fell into ruins in 1919 after being neglected and asset stripped, it is Grade I listed.
Wingfield Manor	Manor house	1441	Ruins		Built for the Treasurer to Henry VI, Sir Ralph Cromwell, though the building was not completed until after his death when John Talbot, the second Earl of Shrewsbury, owned it. During the English Civil War, it was in the hands of Philip Herbert, 4th Earl of Pembroke, a Parliament supporter. It was then left damaged and deserted since the 1770s.

== Devon ==
Name	Type	Date	Condition	Image	Notes
Bayard's Cove Fort	Device Fort	16th-century	Restored		An artillery blockhouse, built to defend the harbour entrance at Dartmouth. It had eleven gunports for heavy artillery. It was used during the English Civil War, but was neglected in the 18th century and used for storage. The fort was restored in the late 19th century.
Berry Pomeroy Castle	Castle	late 15th century	Ruins		A Tudor mansion within the walls of an earlier castle. It was built by the Pomeroy family but by 1547 the family was in financial difficulties and sold the lands to Edward Seymour, 1st Duke of Somerset. Apart from a short period of forfeit to the Crown after Edward's execution, the castle has remained in the Seymour family ever since, although it was abandoned in the late 17th century.
Blackbury Camp	Hillfort	Iron Age	Remains		The ramparts are still relatively high, showing an unusual entrance feature. The fort occupies the end of a large ridge. It was defended by a single bank and ditch, forming a roughly D-shaped enclosure.
Dartmouth Castle	Device Fort	1380s	Complete		An artillery fort, built to protect Dartmouth harbour, in response to the threat of a French attack, the civic authorities created a small enclosure castle overlooking the mouth of the Dart estuary. It was intended to engage enemy ships with catapults and possibly early cannon, and incorporated the local chapel of Saint Petroc within its walls.
Grimspound	Village	late Bronze Age	Remains		It consists of a set of 24 hut circles surrounded by a low granite stone wall. The name was first recorded by the Rev. Richard Polwhele in 1797; it was probably derived from the Anglo-Saxon god of war, Grim (more commonly known as Woden, or Odin).
Hound Tor Deserted Medieval Village	Village	Bronze Age	Remains		'Hundatora' was built on farmland and may have been used for grazing in the Roman period. The village was excavated between 1961 and 1975. It has four 13th-century Dartmoor longhouses, many with a central drainage channel, and several smaller houses and barns. It is mentioned in the Domesday Book.
Kirkham House	Townhouse	14th or 15th century	Complete		A late medieval stone house with slate roof that was designated a Grade II* listed building.
Lydford Castle and Saxon Town	Castle	1195	Ruins		The castle was built following a wave of law and order problems across England. It had a stone tower with a surrounding bailey, and became used as a prison and court to administer the laws in the Forest of Dartmoor and the Devon stannaries. The tower was rebuilt in the 13th century by Richard, the Earl of Cornwall. It was redesigned to resemble a motte and bailey castle. In the 1870s, the roofs and floors had gone.
Merrivale Prehistoric Settlement	Village	Bronze Age	Remains		A series of granite megalithic monuments, includes a 3.8m standing stone, a stone circle and a stone row. Also visible are two stone avenues running parallel to each other on either side of a stream.
Okehampton Castle	Castle	1068–1086	Ruins		A motte and bailey castle, which was built by Baldwin FitzGilbert due to a revolt against Norman rule, and formed the centre of the Honour of Okehampton, guarding a crossing on the West Okement River. It continued in use as a fortification until the late 13th century, when its owners, the de Courtenays, became the Earls of Devon.
Royal Citadel, Plymouth	Fortress	1665–1675	Complete		Designed by Sir Bernard de Gomme, and encompasses the site of the earlier fort that had been built in the time of Sir Francis Drake. Built of local limestone, but the English Baroque gateway, designed by Sir Thomas Fitz, is of Portland stone. In the 1750s, it was equipped with 113 guns. It is still occupied by the military.
Totnes Castle	Castle	1130s	Ruins		A preserved example of a Norman motte and bailey castle in England. The surviving stone keep and curtain wall date from around the 14th century. From after the Norman Conquest of 1066, it was the caput of the feudal barony of Totnes. The first castle was built by the Breton Juhel of Totnes out of wood.
Upper Plym Valley	Earthworks	Bronze Age	Remains		A large array of archaeological sites ranging from prehistoric Drizzlecombe to the 19th-century Eylesbarrow Mine. It contains some 300 Bronze Age and medieval sites, covering 15.5 square kilometres (6 sq mi) of Dartmoor landscape.

== Dorset ==
Name	Type	Date	Condition	Image	Notes
Abbotsbury Abbey	Abbey	11th century	Remains		The abbey was founded by King Cnut's thegn Orc and his wife Tola, who handsomely endowed the monastery with lands in the area. Dedicated to Saint Peter, it was a Benedictine monastery. The abbey prospered and became a local centre of power, controlling eight manor houses and villages.
Christchurch Castle & Norman House	Castle	1160 (Both)	Ruins & Almost Complete		A Norman motte and bailey castle. The castle's site is inside the old Saxon burh dominating the River Avon's lowest crossing. The Constable's House standing adjacent to the castle is a rare and notable example of a Norman domestic dwelling.
Fiddleford Manor	Manor house	1370	Almost complete		A medieval manor house which is thought to have been originally built for William Latimer, the sheriff of Somerset and Dorset, after the manor passed to him in 1355.
Jordan Hill Roman Temple	Temple	c. AD 69–79	Ruins		Romano-British type temple, with a square-plan building situated within a courtyard or precinct. The floorplan of the temple measured 6.8 square metres (73 sq ft). The surrounding precinct contained numerous deposits of animal bones, ceramics and coins.
Kingston Russell Stone Circle	Stone circle	Bronze Age	Remains		The largest Stone Circle in Dorset, measuring 24 by 27 metres (79 by 89 ft) in diameter and containing eighteen sarsen stones arranged in an oval shape.
Knowlton Church and Earthworks	Henge and Church	Neolithic and Bronze Age	Remains and (church) Ruins		There are four enclosures, three are of henge form, Church Henge, Knowlton North and Knowlton South, and the fourth is a squarish enclosure, Old Churchyard. Church Henge is the best preserved of these monuments and encloses Knowlton Church.
Maiden Castle	Hillfort	600 BC	Remains		The site consists of a Neolithic causewayed enclosure and bank barrow. In about 1800 BC, during the Bronze Age, the site was used for growing crops before being abandoned. The early phase of Maiden Castle was similar to many other hill forts in Britain and covering 6.4 hectares (16 acres). Around 450 BCE it was greatly expanded.
Nine Stones, Winterbourne Abbas	Stone circle	Late Neolithic and Early Bronze Age	Remains		Located in the bottom of a narrow valley, the Nine Stones circle consists of nine irregularly spaced sarsen megaliths, with a small opening on its northern side. Two of the stones on the north-western side of the monument are considerably larger than the other seven.
Portland Castle	Device Fort	1539–1541	Complete		Constructed by Henry VIII on the Isle of Portland. It formed part of the King's Device programme to protect against invasion from France and the Holy Roman Empire, and defended the Portland Roads anchorage. The fan-shaped castle was built from Portland stone, with a curved central tower and a gun battery, flanked by two angular wings.
St Catherine's Chapel	Chapel	late 14th century	Restored		Dedicated to Saint Catherine and built as a place of pilgrimage and retreat by the monks of the nearby Benedictine monastery Abbotsbury Abbey, which the chapel overlooks.
Sherborne Old Castle	Castle	12th-century	Ruins		In the grounds of a mansion, it was built as the fortified palace of Roger de Caen, Bishop of Salisbury and Chancellor of England, and still belonged to the church in the late 16th century. In the early 1140s, the castle was captured by Robert Earl of Gloucester during the Anarchy, when it was considered, "the master-key of the whole kingdom".
Winterbourne Poor Lot Barrows	Tumuli	1500 BC	Remains		A group of barrows, or burial mounds. Some are in groups of two or three, perhaps suggesting family relationships. The largest barrow is a bowl barrow, at the centre of the group. Unusually located across the bottom and sides of a valley.

== County Durham ==
Name	Type	Date	Condition	Image	Notes
Auckland Castle Deer House	Deer shelter	1760	Complete		A gothic-style shelter for deer created for Richard Trevor, Bishop of Durham, in 1760. In the grounds of Auckland Castle, the official office of the Bishop of Durham.
Barnard Castle	Castle	1095	Ruins		A ruined medieval castle originally built on the site of an earlier defended position from around 1095 to 1125 by Guy de Balliol. In the 15th century the castle passed by marriage to the Neville family who improved the castle and the estate over the next two centuries. It was sold in 1626 to Henry Vane who dismantled much of the castle.
Bowes Castle	Castle	12th century	Ruins		Built in the corner of an old Roman fort guarding the Stainforth Pass through the Pennines by Alan, Count of Brittany, in the north-west corner of the site.
Derwentcote Steel Furnace	Foundry	1720	Complete		Located near Rowlands Gill, near Newcastle. It is an example of an early cementation furnace which produced high-grade steel.
Egglestone Abbey	Abbey	12th century	Ruins		An abandoned Abbey on the eastern bank of the River Tees. Founded by the Premonstratensians, also known as the White Canons. They chose the site for the abbey was chosen because of its isolation, close proximity to a river and the supply of local stone for its construction.
Finchale Priory	Priory	1196	Ruins		A Benedictine priory, near the River Wear. Includes the remains of an early-12th-century stone chapel of St John the Baptist. The complex was built in the latter half of the 13th century with alterations and additions continuing for the following three centuries.

== East Riding of Yorkshire ==
Name	Type	Date	Condition	Image	Notes
Burton Agnes Manor House	Manor house	1180	Complete		A surviving example of a Norman manor house with a well-preserved Norman undercroft, and was encased in 18th-century brickwork. It is now a Grade I listed building.
Howden Minster	Church	1311	Ruins		A large Grade I listed Church of England church in the Diocese of York. and is one of the largest churches in the East Riding of Yorkshire. It is dedicated to St Peter and St Paul. Its Grade I listed status also includes the Chapter House.
Skipsea Castle	Castle	1086	Ruins		A Norman motte and bailey castle near the village of Skipsea. Built by Drogo de la Beuvrière, on the remains of an Iron Age mound, it was designed to secure the newly conquered region, defend against any potential Danish invasion and control the trade route across the region leading to the North Sea.

== East Sussex ==
Name	Type	Date	Condition	Image	Notes
Bayham Old Abbey	Abbey	1207	Ruins		Founded through a combination of the failing Premonstratensian monasteries of Otham and Brockley, Bayham functioned as an abbey until its dissolution in the 16th century. The ruins were partially modified in the late 18th century, during landscaping of the new Bayham Abbey mansion park, and were donated to the state in 1961.
Battle Abbey	Abbey	11th century	Partially ruined		Battle Abbey is a partially ruined abbey complex in the small town of Battle in East Sussex, England. The abbey was built on the scene of the Battle of Hastings.
Battle of Hastings Battlefield	Battlefield	11th century			Senlac Hill was the site of a battle in 1066 between the Norman-French and the English armies during the Norman conquest of England.
Camber Castle	Device Fort	16th century	Ruins		Camber Castle is one of Henry VIII's Device Forts built to protect the huge Rye anchorage.
Pevensey Castle	Roman fort and Castle	3rd century (Roman fort) and 11th century (castle)	Ruins		Pevensey Castle is a Roman fort (Anderitum) at Pevensey which was later remodelled into a medieval castle in the 11th century.

== Essex ==
Name	Type	Date	Condition	Image	Notes
Audley End House	Country House	17th century	Partly complete		An early-17th-century country house just outside Saffron Walden. It was once a palace in all but name and renowned as one of the finest Jacobean houses in England. It is now only one-third of its original size, but is still large. It remains the family seat of the Lords Braybrooke.
Hadleigh Castle	Castle	13th century	Ruined		The ruins of a royal castle begun in about 1215, but extensively refortified by Edward III during the 14th century. The barbican and two drum towers—one later used by Georgian revenue men looking out for smugglers—are part of his building works during the 1360s.
Lexden Earthworks and Bluebottle Grove	Ramparts	Iron Age	Remains		The banks and ditches of a series of late Iron Age defences protecting the western side of Camulodunum—pre-Roman Colchester.
Mistley Towers	Church towers	1776	Mostly complete		Two porticoed Classical towers, which stood at each end of a grandiose but highly unconventional Georgian church, designed by Robert Adam in 1776.
Prior's Hall Barn	Barn	15th century	Complete		One of the finest surviving medieval barns in eastern England, with an aisled interior and crown post roof, the product of some 400 oaks.
St. Botolph's Priory	Priory	c. 1100	Ruins		The remains of one of the first Augustinian priories in England, founded about 1100. Built in flint and reused Roman brick, the church displays massive circular pillars and round arches and an elaborate west front. It was later damaged during the Civil War siege of 1648.
St John's Abbey Gate, Colchester	Gatehouse	c. 1400	Mostly complete		A pinnacled gatehouse, and all that remains of the Benedictine abbey of St John. Later part of the mansion of the Royalist Lucas family, the gatehouse was bombarded and stormed by Parliamentarian soldiers during the Civil War siege.
Tilbury Fort	Device fort	1539	Mostly complete		A fort built on the north bank of the River Thames to defend London from attack from the sea. Henry VIII built the first fort here, and Queen Elizabeth I rallied her army nearby to face the threat of the Armada. Work started on the current fort in 1670 but was still continuing in the 1680s. The 19th century saw extensive re-design and re-modelling.
Waltham Abbey Gatehouse and Bridge	Gatehouse and bridge	14th century	Ruins		A 14th-century gatehouse belonging to the Augustinian abbey which was dissolved in 1540. Nearby is the 14th-century Harold's Bridge across the Cornmill Stream.

== Gloucestershire ==
Name	Type	Date	Condition	Image	Notes
Belas Knap Long Burrow	Megalithic tomb	Neolithic	Mostly complete		A neolithic chambered long barrow, situated on Cleeve Hill, near Cheltenham. It is of a type known as the Cotswold Severn Cairn, all of which have a similar trapezoid shape, and are found scattered along the River Severn.
Blackfriars, Gloucester	Friary	1239	Mostly complete		One of the most complete surviving Dominican friaries in England, later converted into a Tudor house and cloth factory.
Cirencester Amphitheatre	Amphitheatre	2nd century	Remains		Earthwork remains of one of the largest Roman amphitheatres in Britain, built in the early 2nd century. It served the Roman city of Corinium Dobunnorum (now Cirencester), then second only in size and importance to London.
Great Witcombe Roman Villa	Roman villa	3rd century	Remains		The remains of a large and luxurious villa located on a hillside at Great Witcombe, near Gloucester, with a bathhouse complex and possibly the shrine of a water spirit.
Greyfriars, Gloucester	Church	1518	Ruins		Remains of a Franciscan friary church rebuilt in about 1518
Hailes Abbey	Abbey	1246	Ruins		A Cistercian abbey founded by the Earl of Cornwall in thanks for surviving a shipwreck. It held a renowned relic, "the Holy Blood of Hailes"—allegedly a phial of Christ's own blood. After the dissolution in 1539 just a few of the cloister arches remained, together with the foundations of the church.
Kingswood Abbey Gatehouse	Gatehouse	early 16th century	Partly complete		A 16th-century gatehouse, and one of the latest monastic buildings in England before the Dissolution.
Notgrove Long Barrow	Megalithic tomb	Neolithic	Parts remain		A Neolithic chambered tomb of the Cotswold Severn type situated on the crest of a ridge. The barrow was sealed in 1976 to prevent damage to the site.
Nympsfield Long Barrow	Megalithic tomb	Neolithic	Remains		A chambered long barrow of the Cotswold Severn group overlooking the valley of the River Severn. Its internal burial chambers are uncovered for viewing.
Odda's Chapel	Church	1056	Mostly complete		One of the most complete surviving Saxon churches in England, built by Earl Odda, and rediscovered in 1865 subsumed into a farmhouse.
Offa's Dyke	Defensive earthwork	8th century	Remains		A three-mile section of the great earthwork boundary dyke built along the Anglo-Welsh border by Offa, King of Mercia. This wooded stretch includes the Devil's Pulpit rock, with fine views of Tintern Abbey.
Over Bridge	Bridge	1825–1830	Complete		A single-arch stone bridge spanning the River Severn near Gloucester. It links Over to Alney Island. It was built by the great engineer Thomas Telford.
St Briavels Castle	Castle	12th century	Parts survive		A royal administrative centre for the Forest of Dean. The castle was a favourite hunting lodge of King John. The Keep and the East tower collapsed in the 18th century, by which time the Great Hall had also been demolished. The twin-towered gatehouse of this castle, built by Edward I, survives. Once a prison, it is now a youth hostel.
St Mary's Church, Kempley	Church	12th century	Mostly complete		Norman church, displaying one of the most complete and well preserved sets of medieval wallpaintings in England, dating from the 12th and 14th centuries.
Uley Long Barrow	Megalithic tomb	Neolithic	Mostly complete		Also known as Hetty Pegler's Tump. A partly reconstructed Neolithic chambered mound, 37m long, overlooking the Severn Valley. It contains a stone built central passage with two chambers on either side and another at the end.
Windmill Tump	Megalithic tomb	Neolithic	Partly complete		Also known as Rodmarton Long Barrow, this is a Neolithic chambered tomb with at least three stone-lined chambers. At the eastern end of the mound there is a forecourt flanked by two projections and a so-called false entrance consisting of two standing stones and a stone lintel, blocked by a slab.

== Hampshire ==
Name	Type	Date	Condition	Image	Notes
Bishop's Waltham Palace	Palace	1135	Ruins		Built by the Bishop of Winchester, Henry of Blois, Bishop's Waltham Palace was later used by the Bishops of Winchester as they travelled, along with Farnham Castle and Wolvesey Castle. The palace was destroyed in 1644 after the English Civil War.
Calshot Castle	Device Fort	1540	Mostly complete		One of Henry VIII's device forts, built on Calshot Spit to guard the entrance to Southampton Water. It was built as a circular blockhouse with a three-storey central keep using stone from Beaulieu Abbey. The outer walls were lowered in 1774 and the gatehouse was rebuilt in order to provide more living space. The castle was in use until 1956.
Flowerdown Barrows	Tumuli	Bronze Age	Mostly complete		Three Bronze Age burial mounds in a much larger cemetery, including a well-preserved disc barrow which has been described as "the finest in Hampshire".
Fort Brockhurst	Palmerston Fort	1858–1863	Complete		A fort designed by William Crossman in the 19th century to protect Portsmouth. Its main purpose was to guard the approach from potential landing areas on the south Hampshire coast. The site is only occasionally open to the public.
Fort Cumberland	Fort	1748	Complete		A fort built by the Duke of Cumberland, replacing an earlier earthwork battery. The fort was of earthwork construction with a number of brick buildings. It was completely rebuilt in masonry from 1785 to 1812, and then refortified in the late 19th century. It remained in military ownership for much of the twentieth century.
Hurst Castle	Device Fort	1541–1544	Mostly complete		One of Henry VIII's Device Forts, built at the end of a long shingle beach at the west end of the Solent to guard the approaches to Southampton. It was modified throughout the 19th century, and two large wing batteries were built to house heavy guns. It was fortified again in the Second World War and then decommissioned.
King James's and Landport Gates, Portsmouth	City gates	1687 and 1760	Partly complete		Two ornate gateways which were originally access points to Portsmouth. King James's Gate was built in 1687, but has been moved twice, and is now part of the boundary of the United Services Ground. Landport Gate was built in 1760 as a main entry point to Portsmouth from the Dockyard. The gate is still in its original position.
Medieval Merchant's House, Southampton	Town house	1290	Partly complete		A restored building built in about 1290 by John Fortin, a prosperous merchant. The house survived many centuries of domestic and commercial use largely intact. German bomb damage in 1940 revealed the medieval interior of the house, and in the 1980s it was restored to resemble its initial appearance.
Netley Abbey	Abbey	1239	Ruins		An abbey founded as a house for Cistercian monks. It was closed by Henry VIII in 1536 and the building was converted into a mansion by William Paulet. The abbey was used as a country house until the beginning of the 18th century, after which it was abandoned and partially demolished. Subsequently, the ruins became a tourist attraction, and provided inspiration to poets and artists of the Romantic movement.
Portchester Castle	Roman fort and Castle	3rd century and 11th century	Partly complete		A Roman fort built during the 3rd century to protect the southern coastline of Britain. A castle was built within its walls in the late 11th century. The monarchy controlled the castle for several centuries and it was a favoured hunting lodge of King John. Later in its history the castle was used as a prison.
Royal Garrison Church (Domus Dei), Portsmouth	Hospice or Church	1212	Parts survive		An almshouse and hospice, known as the Domus Dei, established by Pierre des Roches, Bishop of Winchester. It was seized by King Henry VIII in 1540. Towards the end of the 17th century it fell into disrepair until it was restored in 1767 to become the Garrison church. The buildings of Domus Dei were partially destroyed in an attack by German bombers in 1941.
Silchester Roman City Walls and Amphitheatre	Roman town and Amphitheatre	1st century	Remains		A Roman town known as Calleva Atrebatum. It was the civitas capital of the Atrebates tribe. It was abandoned shortly after the end of the Roman era. The earthworks and the ruined city walls are still visible. The area inside the walls is now largely farmland. The remains of the Roman amphitheatre and situated outside the city walls, can be clearly seen.
The Grange, Northington	Country House	1804	Complete		A 19th-century country house and landscape park. It was commissioned in 1804 by Henry Drummond who wanted his brick house transformed into a neoclassical ancient Greek temple.
Titchfield Abbey	Abbey	1222	Parts survive		An abbey founded for Premonstratensian canons. It was closed in 1537 by Henry VIII and the building was converted into a mansion by Thomas Wriothesley, a powerful courtier. In 1781, the abbey was abandoned and partially demolished to create a romantic ruin.
Wolvesey Castle (Old Bishop's Palace), Winchester	Castle	1130	Ruins		A castle erected by the Bishop of Winchester, Henry of Blois. It was the scene for the Rout of Winchester in which the Empress Matilda assaulted the Bishop Henry in 1141. The castle was destroyed by Roundheads during the English Civil War in 1646.

== Herefordshire ==
Name	Type	Date	Condition	Image	Notes
Arthur's Stone	Megalithic tomb	Neolithic	Remains		A Neolithic chambered tomb situated on the ridge line of a hill overlooking both the Golden Valley and the Wye Valley. Today only the large stones of the inner chamber remain.
Edvin Loach Old Church	Church	11th century	Ruins		The ruins of an 11th-century and later church built within the earthworks of a Norman motte and bailey castle.
Goodrich Castle	Castle	11th century	Ruins		A now ruined Norman medieval castle to the north of the village of Goodrich. In the middle of the 12th century the original earth and wood castle was replaced with a stone keep, and was then expanded significantly during the late 13th century into a concentric structure combining living quarters with defences.
Longtown Castle	Castle	c. 1200	Ruins		A thick-walled round keep built c. 1200, characteristic of the Welsh Borders, on a large earthen mound within a stonewalled bailey.
Mortimer's Cross Water Mill	Watermill	18th century	Complete		An 18th-century water mill, situated on the River Lugg, in part working order.
Rotherwas Chapel	Chapel	14th century	Complete		The family chapel of the Roman Catholic Bodenham family rebuilt in the 1580s. The tower was rebuilt in the 18th century. The chapel contains Victorian interior decoration by the Pugins.
Wigmore Castle	Castle	11th century	Ruins		Founded in 1067 by William Fitz Osbern, Wigmore Castle was a stronghold of the Mortimer family from about 1075 to 1425. It was later dismantled to prevent its use during the English Civil War.

== Hertfordshire ==
Name	Type	Date	Condition	Image	Notes
Berkhamsted Castle	Castle	1066	Ruins		A Norman motte-and-bailey castle which was built to obtain control of a key route between London and the Midlands during the Norman conquest of England in the 11th century. Robert of Mortain, William the Conqueror's half brother, was probably responsible for managing its construction, after which he became the castle's owner.
Old Gorhambury House	Country House	1563–68	Ruins		A ruined Elizabethan mansion, an early example of the Elizabethan prodigy house. It was built by Sir Nicholas Bacon, Lord Keeper, and was visited a number of times by Queen Elizabeth.
St Albans Roman Wall	City walls	early 3rd century	Ruins		The defences of Verulamium, which was a town in Roman Britain (around AD 50) and the ancient Watling Street passed through the city.

== Isle of Wight ==
Name	Type	Date	Condition	Image	Notes
Appuldurcombe House	Country House	1702	Ruins		Appuldrucombe was built by Sir Robert Worsley. Then passed on to Earl of Yarborough who installed its pond, servants quarters and gardens. It was abandoned in the 19th century. It was turned into a school, then a hotel, but abandoned yet again. In 1945, it was hit by a landmine and then some of the House, paths, gardens and pond was restored.
Carisbrooke Castle	Castle	11th century	Partial Decay		A motte-and-bailey castle located in the village of Carisbrooke (near Newport). There are traces of a Roman fort underneath the later buildings. Charles I was imprisoned at the castle in the months prior to his trial.
Osborne House	Country House	1845–1851	Complete		A former royal residence in East Cowes. The house was built for Queen Victoria and Prince Albert as a summer home and rural retreat. Prince Albert designed the house himself in the style of an Italian Renaissance palazzo. Queen Victoria died at Osborne House in 1901.
St. Catherine's Oratory	Lighthouse	1328	Complete		A medieval lighthouse on St. Catherine's Down, above the southern coast. It was built by Lord of Chale Walter de Godeton as an act of penance for plundering wine from the wreck of St. Marie of Bayonne in Chale Bay on 20 April 1313.
Yarmouth Castle	Device Fort	1547	Complete		An artillery fort built by Henry VIII to protect Yarmouth Harbour from the threat of French attack. It was refortified by Charles II in the 1670s. It was used during the First and Second World Wars.

== Isles of Scilly ==
Name	Type	Date	Condition	Image	Notes
Bant's Carn Burial Chamber	Megalithic tomb	Bronze Age	Remains		An entrance grave located on a steep slope on the island of St Mary's. The tomb is one of the best examples of a Scillonian entrance grave. There are also remains of post-medieval field systems and other settlements nearby.
Cromwell's Castle	Fort	1651–1652	Mostly complete		On the island of Tresco, it comprises a tall, circular gun tower and an adjacent gun platform, and was designed to prevent enemy naval vessels from entering New Grimsby harbour. Sir Robert Blake constructed the tower between in the aftermath of the Parliamentary invasion of the islands at the end of the English Civil War.
Garrison Walls	Ramparts	1593–4	Mostly complete		A fortification system around the west side of St Mary's. It was based around Star Castle (now a hotel). To protect it on the landward side, a length of curtain wall was built across the neck of the headland from coast to coast, with four bastions and a fortified entrance.
Halangy Down Ancient Village	Village	Iron Age	Remains		On the island of St Mary's, includes two entrance graves, prehistoric field systems, standing stones, post-medieval breastworks, and a Victorian kelp pit. The settlement was used for 500 years, until the end of the Roman occupation in Britain.
Harry's Walls	Ramparts	Started in 1551	Remains		On St Mary's, an unfinished artillery castle situated on a hilltop to the north-east of Hugh Town. It was part of a major phase of fortification on the Isles of Scilly, undertaken to counter threats from the French. It was left unfinished because the site was recognised to be unsuitable.
Innisidgen Lower and Upper Burial Chambers	Megalithic tomb	Bronze Age	Remains		The chambered tombs or entrance graves on a hill overlooking a coastal inlet, are two fine examples of the ceremonial monuments built on hilltops and coastal plateaux. The upper is the best preserved.
King Charles's Castle	Fort	1548–1551	Ruins		Overlooking New Grimsby harbour on Tresco. Built to protect the islands from French attack, it would have held a battery of guns and an accompanying garrison, designed to prevent enemy vessels from entering the harbour. The castle is polygonal in design, constructed from granite stone, with the gun battery at the front.
Old Blockhouse	Fort	1548–1551	Ruins		On Tresco, overlooking Old Grimsby harbour. It was built by the government of Edward VI to protect against French attack and would have housed a battery of 2 or 3 artillery pieces, positioned on a square gun platform on top of a rocky outcrop. An earthwork bank and a stone wall were built to protect it from attack from the beach and the landward sides.
Porth Hellick Down Burial Chamber	Megalithic tomb	Neolithic and Bronze Age	Remains		On St Mary's, the ancient burial monument encompasses a large cairn cemetery that includes at least six entrance graves, other unchambered cairns, and a prehistoric field system. The site is notable for having the largest assembly of surviving entrance graves.

== Kent ==
Name	Type	Date	Condition	Image	Notes
Deal Castle	Device Fort	1539	Complete		A 16th-century coastal artillery fort, located in Deal, between Walmer Castle and the now-lost Sandown Castle.
Dover Castle	Castle	12th century	Complete		A medieval castle in the town of the same name in the English county of Kent. It was founded in the 12th century and has been described as the "Key to England" due to its defensive significance throughout history. It is the largest castle in England.
Dymchurch Martello Tower	Martello Tower	1805	Restored		A Martello Tower in Dymchurch. It stands immediately behind the sea wall. Part of a coastal defence programme
Eynsford Castle	Castle	1088	Ruins		A stone Norman castle in the English county of Kent, within the civil parish bounds of the village of Eynsford. It was historically the manor owning most of the land of the village.
Faversham Stone Chapel	Chapel	AD500	Ruins		A ruined Church of Our Lady of Elwarton, located near Faversham. Its origins date back to the Roman era when it was used for pagan purposes.
Horne's Place Chapel	Chapel	1276	Complete		A late-medieval timber-framed house with private chapel in Appledore.
Kit's Coty House	Megalithic tomb	Neolithic	Ruins		Kit's Coty is the name of the remains of a Neolithic chambered long barrow on Blue Bell Hill near Aylesford.
Knights Templar Church, Dover	Church	11th century	Ruins		The ruins of a medieval church of the Knights Templar, on Bredenstone hill, part of the Dover Western Heights.
Little Kit's Coty House	Megalithic tomb	Neolithic	Ruins		The name of the remains of a Neolithic chambered long barrow on Blue Bell Hill near Aylesford.
Lullingstone Roman Villa	Roman Villa	1st century	Ruins		A villa built during the Roman occupation of Britain, situated near the village of Eynsford. The ruins contain a Roman temple-mausoleum, one of the earliest known chapels in the country.
Maison Dieu, Faversham	Hospice	1234	Complete		The building is a hospital, monastery, hostel, retirement home and Royal lodge commissioned by Henry III in 1234. The building is located beside what is now the A2 road in Faversham.
Milton Chantry, Gravesend	Chantry chapel	1322	Complete		A former Chantry in Gravesend. Now used as the Chantry Heritage Centre displaying a range of exhibits relating to Gravesend, Northfleet and the nearby villages. It is situated within the Napoleonic built Fort Gardens.
Old Soar Manor	Manor house	13th century	Complete		A small 13th century stone manor house near Plaxtol.
Reculver Roman Fort and Reculver Towers	Roman fort and Church	3rd century and 12th century	Ruins		A Roman fort built during the 3rd century to protect the coastline of Britain. A medieval church was built within the fort, and had two towers added in the late 12th century. They survived the demolition of the church in 1809, to provide a landmark for shipping.
Richborough Castle and Amphitheatre	Roman fort	3rd century	Ruins		The ruined remains of a Roman Saxon Shore Fort. It was a major port of Roman Britain. It situated in Richborough near Sandwich.
Rochester Castle	Castle	1087–1089	Ruins		A 12th-century keep or stone tower, is the castle's most prominent feature, which is one of the best preserved in England or France. Located along the River Medway and Watling Street, in Medway.
St Augustine's Abbey	Abbey	5th century	Ruins		A Benedictine monastery in Canterbury. The abbey was founded in 598 and functioned as a monastery until its dissolution in 1538 during the English Reformation. After the abbey's dissolution, it underwent dismantlement until 1848. Since 1848, part of the site has been used for educational purposes and the abbey ruins have been preserved for their historical value.
St Augustine's Conduit House	Water supply	12th century	Ruins		The remains of a medieval conduit house in King's Park, Canterbury. Built to supply water to nearby St Augustine's Abbey.
St Augustine's Cross	Standing cross	1884	Complete		A stone memorial in Pegwell Bay, Thanet. The cross was erected in 1884 to commemorate the arrival of St Augustine in England in AD 597
St John's Commandery	Priory	13th century	Mostly complete		Also known as St John's Commandery, Swingfield was a priory built for the Knights Templar about 5 miles north of Folkestone, Kent.
St Leonard's Tower	Castle	1080	Ruins		A Norman keep in West Malling. The tower was built by Bishop Gundulf around 1080. Situated beside Manor Park Country Park, along St. Leonard's Road.
Sutton Valence Castle	Castle	1150	Ruins		A castle was built in about 1150, probably by Baldwin de Bethune. It was probably built to control the road from Maidstone to the channel ports of Hastings, Rye and Winchelsea. The castle was abandoned about 1300.
Temple Manor	Manor house	Early C13	Complete		A building in Strood, Kent. The Manor has been owned by various religious (including Knights Templar), national and farming owners over 600 years.
Upnor Castle	Device Fort	1559	Mostly complete		Upnor Castle is an Elizabethan artillery fort located in the village of Upnor, Medway, South East England. Its purpose was to defend ships moored "in ordinary" on the River Medway outside Chatham Dockyard.
Walmer Castle	Device Fort	1539–1540	Complete		A castle at Walmer in Kent, built by Henry VIII in 1539–1540 as an artillery fortress to counter the threat of invasion from Catholic France and Spain. It was part of his programme to create a chain of coastal defences along England's coast known as the Device Forts or as Henrician Castles.
Western Heights, Dover	Ramparts	1779	Mostly complete		A series of forts, strong points and ditches, designed to protect the country from invasion. They were created to augment the existing defences and protect the key port of Dover from both seaward and landward attack.

== Lancashire ==
Name	Type	Date	Condition	Image	Notes
Goodshaw Chapel	Chapel	1760	Complete		A Baptist chapel that was enlarged on a number of occasions in the later 18th and early 19th centuries.
Sawley Abbey	Abbey	1149	Ruins		An abbey of Cistercian monks that was created as a daughter-house of Newminster Abbey. It survived until its dissolution in 1536, during the reign of King Henry VIII.
Warton Old Rectory	Rectory	Early 14th century	Ruins		A former rectory in the village of which has been designated a Scheduled Ancient Monument and Grade I listed building. It was the residence of the rector of the parish of St Oswald's.
Whalley Abbey Gatehouse	Gatehouse	1296	Ruins		A former Cistercian abbey, but after the dissolution of the monasteries, the abbey was largely demolished and a country house was built on the site. In the 20th century the house was modified and it is now the Retreat and Conference House of the Diocese of Blackburn. The abbey is now a designated Grade I listed building and are a Scheduled Ancient Monument.

== Leicestershire ==
Name	Type	Date	Condition	Image	Notes
Ashby de la Zouch Castle	Castle	1473–1474	Ruins		The castle was built by William, Lord Hastings, a favourite of Edward IV, accompanied by the creation of a 3,000-acre (1,200 ha) park. Constructed on the site of an older manor house, two large towers and various smaller buildings had been constructed by 1483, when Hastings was executed by Richard, Duke of Gloucester. It was in the Hastings family for several generations, as they improved the gardens and hosted royal visitors.
Jewry Wall	Wall	2nd-century	Ruins		A large wall of Roman masonry, with two large archways. It stands alongside St Nicholas' Circle and St Nicholas' Church. It formed the west wall of a public building in Ratae Corieltauvorum (Roman Leicester), alongside public baths, the foundations of which were excavated in the 1930s and are also open to view.
Kirby Muxloe Castle	Castle	1480	Ruins		A fortified manor house of William, Lord Hastings, founding it on the site of a pre-existing manor house. After his death, his widow stayed in it but parts of the castle were inhabited for a period, before it all fell into ruin during the course of the 17th century.

== Lincolnshire ==
Name	Type	Date	Condition	Image	Notes
Bolingbroke Castle	Castle	c. 1220	Ruins		A Norman built a Motte-and-bailey on a nearby hill above a settlement. It was founded by Ranulf, Earl of Chesterbut by the 15th and 16th centuries, it had fallen into disrepair. In 1643 it was badly damaged in a siege during the Battle of Winceby.
Gainsborough Old Hall	Manor house	1471–1484	Complete		One of the best-preserved medieval manors in England. Built by Sir Thomas Burgh. In 1470, it was attacked by Sir Robert Welles over a clash about lands, status, and honour, but not severely damaged. In 1484, Sir Thomas entertained King Richard III in his hall.
Gainsthorpe Medieval Village	Village	Before 1208	Remains		A deserted medieval village, typical medieval layout of sunken roads and raised rectangular tofts and crofts is clearly seen in the humps and hollows of the field. Mentioned in the Domesday Book, but lost before the 17th century.
Lincoln Medieval Bishop's Palace	Palace	c1175	Ruins		Was one of the most impressive buildings of medieval England, for the Lincoln's bishops. Sited just below Lincoln Cathedral, but it was damaged during the Civil War and then largely abandoned as the bishops moved locations.
Sibsey Trader Windmill	Windmill	1877	Complete		It is a six-storey windmill with complete gear, six sails and fantail, built by Saunderson of Louth in the typical Lincolnshire style. It has been restored and still works today. It is a Grade I listed building.
St Peter's Church, Barton-upon-Humber	Church	9th/10th century	Complete		One of the best known Anglo-Saxon buildings. It is on the site of an early pagan Saxon cemetery. In 669 Saint Chad founded a monastery in the town. An Anglo-Saxon charter dated 971 suggests that Barton became a grange for it.
Tattershall College	School	1454–1460	Ruins		A grammar school established in 1439. The building was built by the 3rd Baron Cromwell for the education of the church choristers and was once an example of the perpendicular style of Gothic architecture. Although the school was formally dissolved in 1545.
Thornton Abbey and Gatehouse	Abbey	1139	Ruins		It was founded as a priory by William le Gros, the Earl of Yorkshire, and raised to the status of abbey in 1148 by Pope Eugene III. It is a Grade I listed building, including notably England's largest and most impressive surviving monastic gatehouse.

== London ==
Name	Type	Date	Condition	Image	Notes
Apsley House	Townhouse	1770s	Complete		This Georgian building was the London home of the first Duke of Wellington and has changed very little since his victory at Waterloo in 1815.
Chapter House and Pyx Chamber	Chapter house	1245-1253	Complete		Built at the same time as Westminster Abbey, it was restored by Sir George Gilbert Scott in 1872, in a Geometrical Gothic style with an octagonal crypt below. Originally used by Benedictine monks for daily meetings. It later became a meeting place of the King's Great Council.
Chiswick House	Townhouse	1729	Complete		An example of Neo-Palladian architecture in London, the house was built and designed by Richard Boyle, 3rd Earl of Burlington (1694-1753). William Cavendish, 4th Duke of Devonshire, and then 5th Duke of Devonshire owned the house. It was used as an asylum (mental hospital), the Chiswick Asylum from 1892.
Coombe Conduit	Water supply	1529	Remains		It provided fresh water to Hampton Court Palace, the system was installed during Henry VIII's residence. It belonged until 1538 to Merton Priory. It supplied the palace with water until 1876 from lead piping.
Down House	Country House	1778	Complete		Home of Charles Darwin from 1842 to 1882. He wrote On the Origin of Species while living here.
Eltham Palace	Palace	1305	Complete		The large house consists of the medieval great hall of a former royal residence, to which an Art Deco extension was added in the 1930s. The hammerbeam roof of the great hall is the third largest of its type in England, and the Art Deco interior of the house has been described as a "masterpiece of modern design".
Harmondsworth Great Barn	Tithe barn	early 15th century	Complete		A medieval barn on the former Manor Farm, built by Winchester College. It is the largest timber-framed building in England and is regarded as an outstanding example of medieval carpentry.
Jewel Tower	Tower	1365-1366	Complete		A surviving element of the Palace of Westminster, in London, England. It was built by William of Sleaford and Henry de Yevele, to house the personal treasure of King Edward III. It was used until 1512, when a fire in the Palace caused King Henry VIII to relocate his court to the nearby Palace of Whitehall.
Kenwood House	Country House	17th century	Complete		A former stately home which was originally constructed for the Earls of Mansfield during the 18th and 19th centuries. It was bought from the 6th Earl of Mansfield in 1925 by Edward Guinness, 1st Earl of Iveagh, and then donated to the nation in 1927.
London Wall, Tower Hill	Wall	c. 200 CE	Remains		Originally a defensive wall first built by the Romans around the strategically important port town of Londinium. It had successive medieval restorations and repairs. From the 18th century onward, the expansion of the City of London saw large parts of the wall demolished, including its city gates.
Marble Hill House	Country House	1724-1729	Complete		A Palladian villa, it was built for Henrietta Howard, Countess of Suffolk, who lived there until her death. The compact design soon became famous and furnished a standard model for the Georgian English villa and for plantation houses in the American colonies, now Grade I listed.
Ranger's House	Country House	1722–1723	Complete		A medium-sized red brick Georgian mansion in the Palladian style and backs directly onto Greenwich Park. It was Chesterfield House, its current name is associated with the Ranger of Greenwich Park, a royal appointment; the house was the Ranger's official residence for most of the 19th century. It is a Grade I listed building.
Wellington Arch	Triumphal arch	1826	Complete		It was originally Green Park Arch, a triumphal arch by Decimus Burton. It originally supported a large equestrian statue of the 1st Duke of Wellington by the sculptor Matthew Cotes Wyatt, it then acquired the name "the Wellington Arch". Due to increasing traffic, it was moved to its current site in 1882–1883. The horse went to Aldershot and a bronze quadriga (an ancient four-horse chariot) by Adrian Jones has surmounted it since 1912.
Winchester Palace	Palace	12th century	Remains		The former palace was the London townhouse of the Bishops of Winchester. It was mostly destroyed by fire in 1814 and it is Grade II listed and designated a Scheduled Ancient Monument.

== Norfolk ==
Name	Type	Date	Condition	Image	Notes
Baconsthorpe Castle	Castle	15th century	Ruins		It was established on the site of a former manor hall, probably by John Heydon I and his father, William. He built a tall, fortified house, but his descendants became wealthy sheep farmers and turned the property into a courtyard house, complete with a nearby deer park.
Berney Arms Windmill	Windmill	1865	Restored		On the River Yare in The Broads, built for the Reedham Cement Company by the millwright firm of Stolworthy on the site of a previous mill. It was initially used to grind cement clinker, using chalk and clay. In 1883, it became a drainage mill.
Binham Market Cross	Standing cross	15th century	Remains		One of the best surviving examples of a medieval standing cross in Norfolk. It is built of Barnack limestone and has a socket stone and separate shaft. It has a 2-metre-tall base and stands on the green in the centre of the village.
Binham Priory	Priory	late 11th century	Ruins		A former Benedictine priory founded by Peter de Valognes and his wife Albreda. Today the nave of the much larger priory church has become the Church of St. Mary and the Holy Cross and is still used. The abbey's west face is the first example in England of gothic bar tracery, predating Westminster Abbey by a decade.
Blakeney Guildhall	Townhouse	14th century	Remains		Most likely to have originally been built for a prosperous medieval Blakeney fish merchant, with the undercroft being used for storage of his merchandise. Later, it became the guildhall of Blakeney's guild of fish merchants.
Burgh Castle	Roman fort	3rd century AD	Remains		One of 9 Roman Saxon Shore forts constructed in England to hold troops as a defence against Saxon raids up the rivers of the east and south coasts. Between the mid-7th and 9th centuries, the site was possibly occupied by a monastic settlement, and in the 11th and 12th centuries a Norman motte and bailey castle existed there but was levelled.
Caister Roman Fort	Roman fort	AD 200	Remains		It was constructed for a unit of the Roman army and navy and occupied until around 370-390 AD. The site remained unoccupied until the Middle and Late Saxon periods, until a settlement was established near the centre of the fort.
Castle Acre Bailey Gate	City gates	1165	Complete		One of three large stone gatehouses in the castle and town. Hamelin de Warenne (half-brother of King Henry II) completed the work started by William de Warenne, 3rd Earl of Surrey after he died.
Castle Acre Castle	Castle	c. 1140–1165	Ruins		The castle was built soon after the Norman Conquest by William de Warenne, the Earl of Surrey. He constructed a motte-and-bailey castle during the 1070s, protected by large earthwork ramparts, with a large country house in the centre of the motte. When it was inherited by Richard Fitzalan, the Earl of Arundel, in 1397 the fortifications were in ruins.
Castle Acre Priory	Priory	1089	Ruins		A Cluniac priory dedicated to St Mary, St Peter, and St Paul. It is thought to have been founded by William de Warenne, 2nd Earl of Surrey. Originally the priory was sited within the walls of the Castle, but the priory was relocated to the present site in the castle grounds about one year later. The priory was dissolved in 1537.
Castle Rising Castle	Castle	1138	Ruins		It was built by William d'Aubigny II, the Earl of Arundel, with its deer park, part fortress and hunting lodge. Queen Isabella, lived there after her fall from power in 1330. Then by the middle of the 16th century, it was derelict, then Henry VIII sold the property to Thomas Howard, the Duke of Norfolk and most of the castle buildings were demolished.
Cow Tower, Norwich	Tower	1398–1399	Ruins		An artillery tower by the River Wensum, built by the city authorities in response to the threat from France and English rebels, the tower was intended to defend the north-eastern approach to Norwich with hand cannons and bombards. It stood apart from the main city walls, close to the river where its height would have allowed it to fire onto the higher ground opposite the city. The tower was designed to hold a garrison now a shell.
Creake Abbey	Abbey	12th century	Ruins		It was founded by the Augustinians as a priory, in 1231 it became an Abbey. In 1483, a fire swept through the abbey, damaging the church and several of the other buildings beyond repair. In 1506 an outbreak of 'sweating sickness' wiped out the monastic community.
Great Yarmouth Row Houses	Townhouses	early 17th century	2 Complete		Originally built as one family's dwelling, were later sub-divided into tenements and became part of the town's distinctive "Rows"', a network of narrow alleyways linking three main thoroughfares. Many "Row Houses" were damaged by Second World War bombing or demolished during post-war clearances.
Greyfriars' Cloisters, Great Yarmouth	Friary	c.1226	Ruins		A Franciscan monastic house under the Custody of Cambridge, founded by Sir William Garbridge, enlarged in 1285 and 1290, and dissolved in 1538 as part of the Dissolution of the Monasteries under King Henry VIII.
Grimes Graves	Flint mine	c. 2600	Complete		It was worked up to c. 2300 BC, although production may have continued well into the Bronze and Iron Ages (and later) owing to the low cost of flint compared with metals. Flint was much in demand for making polished stone axes in the Neolithic period.
North Elham Chapel	Chapel	1091–1119	Ruins		A Norman Chapel built for Bishop Herbert de Losinga. In the 14th century, it was converted into a fortified manor house by Henry Despenser, the Bishop of Norwich who suppressed the Peasants' Revolt of 1381.
St Olave's Priory	Priory	1239	Remains		An Augustinian priory of Black Canons, founded by Sir Roger Fitz Osbert of Somerley in the time of Henry III. In 1536, Sir Humphrey Wingfield, the Commissioner for the Dissolution of the Monasteries made over the priory site to a local man, Sir Henry Jerningham of Somerleyton.
Thetford, Church of the Holy Sepulchre	Priory	14th-century	Ruins		A medieval monastic house of Canons of the Holy Sepulchre, who followed the Rule of Saint Augustine and aided pilgrims to Christ's tomb. It was later used as a barn, and is a Grade I listed building. The nave is the only surviving remains in England.
Thetford Priory	Priory	1103	Remains		A Cluniac monastic house founded by Roger Bigod, 1st Earl of Norfolk. In the 13th century, the Virgin Mary is said to have appeared in a vision to locals requesting the addition to the site of a Lady Chapel. Later, the old statue of her was discovered to have a hollow in its head concealing saints' relics, and became a magnet for pilgrims.
Thetford Warren Lodge	Hunting lodge	1400	Remains		Built by the Prior of Thetford to protect gamekeepers and hunters against poachers, and was later used to harvest rabbits.
Weeting Castle	Castle	1180	Ruins		A medieval manor house built by Hugh de Plais, and comprised a 3-storey tower, a large hall, and a service block, with a separate kitchen positioned near the house. A moat was dug in the 13th century. The house was not fortified, but had architectural features found in castles of the period, and instead formed a high-status domestic dwelling.

== North Yorkshire ==
Name	Type	Date	Condition	Image	Notes
Aldborough Roman Site	Town	1st century	Remains		Remains of a Roman town, once capital of the Brigantes tribe. Ruins laid out amid a Victorian arboretum with an onsite museum.
Beadlam Roman Villa	Roman Villa	3rd century	Remains		Remains of a Roman villa on the outskirts of Helmsley.
Byland Abbey	Abbey	1135	Ruins		Cistercian monastery with early gothic architecture
Clifford's Tower	Castle	13th century	Mostly complete		The keep of York Castle, and the most prominent surviving part of the original medieval fortification. It was built on the orders of William I and rebuilt by Henry III. It has also served as a prison and a royal mint.
Easby Abbey	Abbey	1152	Ruins		Premonstratensian abbey. Notable for its lavish roof-height refectory built around 1300. Within the precinct is the still-active parish church, displaying 13th-century wall paintings.
Fountains Abbey	Abbey	1132	Ruins		One of the largest and best preserved ruined Cistercian monasteries in England. Owned by the National Trust and maintained by English Heritage.
Gisborough Priory	Priory	14th century	Ruins		An Augustinian priory founded in 1119 by an ancestor of Robert the Bruce. It is dominated by the skeleton of the 14th-century church's east end.
Helmsley Castle	Castle	13th century	Ruins		A castle founded around 1120, and rebuilt around 1300. It later became a Tudor mansion, a Civil War stronghold, and then a romantic Victorian ruin.
Kirkham Priory	Priory	1120s	Ruins		An Augustinian priory was founded in the 1120s by Walter l'Espec, lord of nearby Helmsley, who also built Rievaulx Abbey.
Marmion Tower	Tower	15th century	Ruins		A gatehouse of a vanished riverside manor house. The monuments of the manor's family owners are in the adjacent church.
Middleham Castle	Castle	12th century	Ruins		A fortified palace in Wensleydale. Once the childhood home of Richard III.
Mount Grace Priory	Priory	1398	Ruins		The best-preserved Carthusian priory in Britain
Pickering Castle	Castle	13th century	Ruins		A motte-and-bailey fortification used as a royal hunting lodge, holiday home and a stud farm by a succession of medieval kings.
Piercebridge Roman Bridge	Bridge	2nd century	Remains		Stonework foundations, now marooned in a field, of a bridge which once led to Piercebridge Roman Fort.
Richmond Castle	Castle	11th century	Ruins		A castle originally built to subdue the unruly north of England, it is one of the greatest Norman fortresses in Britain.
Rievaulx Abbey	Abbey	1132	Ruins		A Cistercian abbey, and once one of the wealthiest abbeys in England. It is one of the most complete and atmospheric of England's abbey ruins.
St Mary's Church, Studley Royal	Church	1870s	Complete		A Victorian Gothic Revival church, located in the grounds of Studley Royal Park at Fountains Abbey
Scarborough Castle	Castle	12th century	Ruins		A medieval Royal fortress. The site of the castle, encompasses an Iron Age settlement, Roman signal station, an Anglo-Scandinavian settlement and chapel, a 12th-century enclosure castle and an 18th-century battery.
Spofforth Castle	Castle	14th century	Ruins		The ruined hall and chamber of a fortified manor house, dating mainly from the 14th and 15th centuries. Its undercroft is cut into a rocky outcrop.
Stanwick Iron Age Fortifications	Hillfort	Iron-age	Remains		An excavated section, part cut into rock, of the ramparts of the huge Iron Age trading and power centre of the Brigantes tribe.
Steeton Hall Gateway	Gatehouse	14th century	Ruins		A small, well-preserved, manorial gatehouse.
Thornborough Henges	Henge	Neolithic	Remains		Three aligned henges often described as "Stonehenge of the North". Two of the henges are in guardianship of English Heritage while the third is still private.
Wharram Percy Deserted Medieval Village	Village	Medieval	Remains		A deserted medieval village. Above the substantial ruins of the church and a recreated fishpond, the outlines of many lost houses are traceable on a grassy plateau.
Wade's Causeway	Earthworks	Unknown	Remains		A mile-long stretch of enigmatic ancient road, also known as "Wheeldale Roman Road". Once thought to be Roman but possibly much earlier or later.
Whitby Abbey	Abbey	11th century	Ruins		A ruined Benedictine abbey overlooking the North Sea on the cliffs above Whitby. The first monastery was founded in 657 AD.
York Cold War Bunker	Bunker	1961	Complete		A nerve centre to monitor fallout in the event of a nuclear attack. It was in active service until the 1990s.

== Northamptonshire ==
Name	Type	Date	Condition	Image	Notes
Apethorpe Hall	Country House	15th century	Complete		A Grade I listed country house dating back to the 15th century and was a "favourite royal residence for James I". At least thirteen extended royal visits from the Stuart kings stayed at the Jacobean palace. The Lebanese cedar planted in the ground in 1614 is a scheduled monument considered as the oldest surviving one in England.
Chichele College	Chantry chapel	1422	Mostly complete		It was founded by the locally born Henry Chichele, Archbishop of Canterbury for the use of groups of priests who shared a communal life. The gatehouse, chapel and other remains of the college buildings survive.
Eleanor Cross, Geddington	Standing cross	1294 or 1295	Complete		A series of twelve tall and lavishly decorated stone monuments topped with crosses erected in a line down part of the east of England. King Edward I had them built in memory of his beloved wife Eleanor of Castile. Ones at Geddington, Hardingstone and Waltham Cross all survive mostly intact; but the other nine, other than a few fragments, are lost.
Kirby Hall	Country House	1570	Remains		An Elizabethan country house which was owned by Sir Christopher Hatton, Lord Chancellor to Queen Elizabeth I. It is a leading and early example of the Elizabethan prodigy house. It was based on the designs in French architectural pattern books and expanded in the Classical style over the course of the following decades.
Rushton Triangular Lodge	Folly	1593 and 1597	Complete		Designed by Sir Thomas Tresham and constructed using alternating bands of dark and light limestone. It was designed as a protestation of his Roman Catholic faith, with his belief in the Holy Trinity which is represented everywhere in the Lodge by the number 3.

== Northumberland ==
Name	Type	Date	Condition	Image	Notes
Aydon Castle	Castle	1296–1305	Restored		Originally a timber hall, Robert de Raymes started stone fortification as Scottish border Reivers began to launch raids. It was captured in 1315 after the governor of the castle surrendered to the besieging forces. It was pillaged, burnt, and severely damaged but later repaired. From the 17th century onward, it was operated as a farmhouse.
Belsay Hall, Castle & Gardens	Castle.	1370	Complete		A substantial three-storey rectangular pele tower with rounded turrets and battlements, and was the home of the Middleton family. In 1614 Thomas Middleton built a new manor house attached to the tower. A west wing was added in 1711 but was later largely demolished in 1872 by Sir Arthur Middleton when the house was considerably altered.
Berwick-upon-Tweed Barracks & Main Guard	Barracks	1717–1721	Complete		The barracks were built by Nicholas Hawksmoor for the Board of Ordnance to protect the town during the Jacobite risings. It involved two parallel blocks of military accommodation. An additional block was added between 1739 and 1741. After the Napoleonic Wars the barracks were abandoned but put back into use in the 1850s.
Berwick-upon-Tweed Castle & Berwick Ramparts	Castle and Ramparts	1120s and early 14th century	Ruins and Complete		The castle was commissioned by the Scottish King David I. It was taken by the English forces under the terms of the Treaty of Falaise in 1175, but then sold back to Scotland by the English king Richard I to fund the Third Crusade in around 1190. The town walls were built by Edward I, following his capture of the city from the Scots.
Black Middens Bastle House	Manor house	mid-16th century	Ruins		A fortified farmhouse with thick stone walls, of a type distinctive to the troubled 16th-century Anglo-Scottish borders. The living quarters were only accessible at first floor level.
Brinkburn Priory	Priory	c.1135	Priory church restored, rest remains		It was founded by William Bertram, Baron of Mitford, in the reign of Henry I as an Augustinian priory. Priory was dissolved in 1536, then in 1700s roof collapsed, then restored in 1858. Also stained glass windows were added in 1864.
Dunstanburgh Castle	Castle	1313–1322	Ruins		The castle was built by Earl Thomas of Lancaster, taking advantage of the site's natural defences and the existing earthworks of an Iron Age fort. The defences were expanded in the 1380s by John of Gaunt, the Duke of Lancaster. It suffered much damage during the Wars of the Roses and by the 16th century it was a ruins.
Edlingham Castle	Castle	c.1174	Ruins		A fortified manor house, that William de Felton strengthened by building strong ramparts, a gatehouse, fortifying the main hall and adding other buildings. A solar tower was added later. Most was dismantled except the tower in the 1660s to build nearby farmhouses.
Etal Castle	Castle	1341	Ruins		A medieval fortification built by Robert Manners, and comprised a residential tower, a gatehouse and a corner tower, protected by a curtain wall. The castle was involved in the battle between the rival Manners and Heron families outside the walls in 1428, and in 1513 it was briefly captured by King James IV of Scotland during his invasion of England.
Hadrian's Wall: Black Carts Turret	Turret	AD 122	Remains		Although severely robbed on the south side, the masonry stands up to eleven courses high in the recess. The presence of the broad wing walls indicates that the fortification was constructed prior to Hadrian's Wall itself.
Hadrian's Wall: Brunton Turret	Turret	AD 122	Remains		West of Brunton House, walls up to 2.8m high still exist and Hadrian's Wall forms the north wall of the turret. Within the turret is a free-standing altar.
Hadrian's Wall: Cawfields Roman Wall	Wall	AD 122	Remains		Built on a steep slope, one of the highest standing sections of the Wall. Within its length there are turrets and a milecastle, which was probably built by the Second Legion.
Hadrian's Wall: Chesters Roman Fort and Chesters Bridge	Roman fort and Bridge	AD 123 and AD 122–4	Both Remains		Fort Cilurnum, the best-preserved Roman cavalry fort, was built to guard the bridge across the River North Tyne. The bridge carried the Military Way Roman road and part of Hadrian's Wall. The bridge remains were first located in 1860.
Hadrian's Wall: Corbridge Roman Town	Roman fort	AD 84 and AD 122	Remains		At the junction of two Roman roads, Dere Street and Stanegate. Originally built out of timber and earth ramparts, but burnt down in AD 105. Replaced by a stone fort and a town, that was never finished.
Hadrian's Wall: Heddon-on-the-Wall	Wall	AD 122 or 123	Remains		A consolidated stretch of wall, up to two metres thick in places. Two hundred and eighty yards long with circular chambers and medieval kiln near west end.
Hadrian's Wall: Housesteads Roman Fort	Roman fort	AD 124	Remains		Built of stone, housed a garrison consisting of an unknown double-sized auxiliary infantry cohort and a detachment of legionaries. It was dependent upon rainwater collection. By 409 AD it was unused by the Romans.
Hadrian's Wall: Planetrees Roman Wall	Wall	AD 122	Remains		Named after the farm located around 250 metres (270 yards) to the west of the Wall. The surviving section is 35 metres (115 ft) in length.
Hadrian's Wall: Sewingshields Wall	Wall	AD 122	Remains		A length of Wall with milecastle remains, sited along the Whin Sill (natural ridge). A milecastle is located within this section, sited on the very edge of the crag, was re-occupied by a farm in the Middle Ages.
Hadrian's Wall: Temple of Mithras, Carrawburgh	Temple	AD 122	Remains		Near to an auxiliary fort on the Wall, a temple of the cult of the Roman god Mithras. Discovered in 1949 and excavated in 1950. Built to resemble a cave, had an anteroom, and a nave with raised benches (podia) along the sides.
Hadrian's Wall: Walltown Crags	Wall	AD 122	Remains		Milecastle 45 is located on the top of Walltown Crags (a natural ridge). The walls have been comprehensively robbed, and little remains but the robber trenches and turf-covered spoil mounds. It has two turrets (watch towers) but one was destroyed soon after 1883 by the operations of the Greenland Quarry.
Hadrian's Wall: Winshields Wall	Wall	AD 122	Remains		A 350-yard stretch of wall includes the highest point on Hadrian's Wall. It also features an unexcavated milecastle at the eastern end. The milecastle was in use until the late 4th century. Inside, archaeologists discovered the remains of a bread oven and a rectangular building with a sunken floor.
Lindisfarne Priory	Priory	1150	Ruins		The monastery of Lindisfarne was founded in 634 by Irish monk Saint Aidan, then Finian (bishop 651–661) built a timber church "suitable for a bishop's seat". A later bishop, Eadbert, removed the thatch and covered both walls and roof in lead. The later stone church, contained a cenotaph (an empty tomb) marking the spot where, according to tradition, Northumbria's patron saint, Saint Cuthbert's body had been buried.
Norham Castle	Castle	1121	Ruins		Founded when Ranulf Flambard, Bishop of Durham from 1099 to 1128, in order to protect the property from incursions by the Scots. It saw much action during the wars between England and Scotland, was rebuilt several times until 1597 when it was unused.
Prudhoe Castle	Castle	c 11th century	Ruins		On the site was a Norman motte and bailey, following the Norman Conquest, the Umfraville family took over control of the castle. The wooden palisade with a massive rampart of clay and stones and subsequently constructed a stone curtain wall and gatehouse. In 1173, stone keep and a great hall was added.
Warkworth Castle	Castle	12th century	Ruins		First documented in a charter of 1157–1164 when Henry II granted it to Roger fitz Richard. The timber castle was considered "feeble", and was left undefended when the Scots invaded in 1173. The stone keep was built by Henry Percy, 1st Earl of Northumberland after 1377. In 1464, a tall defensive rectangular tower was built.
Warkworth Hermitage	Hermitage	late 14th century	Ruins		Built onto and within a cliff face on the north bank of the River Coquet out of stone. Comprises a chapel and a smaller chamber, each having an altar. There is an altar-tomb with a female effigy in the chapel.

== Nottinghamshire ==
Name	Type	Date	Condition	Image	Notes
Mattersey Priory	Priory	c. 1185	Ruins		A former monastery of the Gilbertine order. The priory was founded by Roger FitzRalph and was dedicated to St Helen. It was home to only male canons, and the church was destroyed by fire in 1279 and not rebuilt. It was dissolved as part of King Henry VIII's Dissolution of the Monasteries in 1538.
Rufford Abbey	Abbey	1147	Partially complete		Originally a Cistercian abbey, it was converted to a country house in the 16th century after the Dissolution of the Monasteries. Part of the house was demolished in the 20th century, but the remains, standing in 150 acres of park and woodland.

== Oxfordshire ==
Name	Type	Date	Condition	Image	Notes
Abingdon County Hall Museum	County Hall and Museum	1683	Complete		The building was built to serve as the principal sessions house and administrative home for the Justices of the county. It was designed in the Baroque style by Christopher Kempster who trained with Sir Christopher Wren. It stands on large pilasters with a sheltered area beneath for use as a market or other municipal functions.
Deddington Castle	Castle	11th Century	Remains		An extensive earthwork of a motte-and-bailey castle, with only the earth ramparts and mound now visible. It was built on a wealthy former Anglo-Saxon estate by Bishop Odo of Bayeux, half-brother of William the Conqueror. It was strengthened in the 12th century, but from the 13th century onwards it fell into disrepair.
Minster Lovell Hall and Dovecote	Manor house	1440	Ruins		Minster Lovell Hall was built by William Lovell, it surrounded three sides of a square; the fourth side towards the River Windrush was closed off by a wall.
North Hinksey Conduit House	Water supply	1610	Complete		It supplied the city of Oxford with water until 1869, using an underground lead pipe from a spring on the hillside above the village of North Hinksey.
North Leigh Roman Villa	Roman Villa	Late Iron Age	Remains		Excavations carried out in 1813–16, indicate that in the 1st or early 2nd century AD, the first villa building was built. It consisted of three buildings, one of which was a bath-house, along the line of what was the north-west range. Early in the 3rd century the south-west and north-east wings were added, partially enclosing the courtyard.
Rollright Stones	Stone circle and Megalithic tomb	Neolithic and Bronze Age	Remains		A complex of three monuments, constructed from local oolitic limestone, are distinct in their design and purpose. They were built at different periods in late prehistory. Firstly, a dolmen that dates to the Early or Middle Neolithic period. Probably, a place of burial. Then a stone circle in the Late Neolithic or Early Bronze Age, then lastly a single monolith.
Uffington Castle	Hillfort	7th or 8th century BC	Remains		An early Iron Age (with underlying Bronze Age) hillfort which is surrounded by two earth banks separated by a ditch with an entrance in the western end. A second entrance in the eastern end was apparently blocked up a few centuries after it was built.
Uffington: Dragon Hill	Mound	Iron Age	Remains		A natural chalk hill with an artificially flattened top (on the scarp slope of White Horse Hill); according to legend, Saint George slew the dragon here. A bare patch of chalk upon which no grass will grow is purported to be where the dragon's blood spilled.
Uffington White Horse	Hill figure	Iron Age or the late Bronze Age	Complete		110 m (360 ft) long, formed from deep trenches filled with crushed white chalk and the oldest of the white horse figures in Britain.
Wayland's Smithy	Megalithic tomb	Early Neolithic	Remains		A chambered long barrow probably constructed in the 3600s BC, today it survives in a partially reconstructed state, following excavations undertaken in 1962–63.

== Rutland ==
Name	Type	Date	Condition	Image	Notes
Lyddington Bede House	Almshouse	12th century	Complete		An historic house that is existing Grade I listed building and is a part of a former palace of the Bishops of Lincoln, situated next to the church in the village. The watch tower or gazebo is separately listed as Grade I and the boundary walls are Grade II. The site is a scheduled ancient monument.

== Shropshire ==
Name	Type	Date	Condition	Image	Notes
Acton Burnell Castle	Castle	1284	Ruins		Fortified manor house built by Robert Burnell, Bishop of Bath and Wells, friend and advisor to King Edward I. It is believed that the first Parliament of England at which the Commons were fully represented was held here in 1283.
Boscobel House and The Royal Oak	Manor house and Oak tree	1632 and Unknown planting	Complete and damaged		A Grade II* listed building that has been, at various times, a farmhouse, a hunting lodge and a holiday home, but it is most famous for its role in the escape of Charles II after the Battle of Worcester in 1651. The oak is a direct descendant of the original tree used by Charles to hide from the Parliamentary soldiers.
Buildwas Abbey	Abbey	1135	Remains		A Cistercian (originally Savigniac) monastery, founded by the local bishop, then under Abbot Ranulf in the second half of the 12th century. It was a centre of learning, with a substantial library. After dissolution fell into ruin.
Cantlop Bridge	Bridge	1818	Complete		A single span cast-iron road bridge over the Cound Brook. It was constructed to a design possibly by Thomas Telford, having at least been approved by him, and replaced an unsuccessful cast-iron coach bridge constructed in 1812.
Clun Castle	Castle	After 1066	Ruins		It was established by the Norman lord Robert de Say after the Norman invasion of England and went on to become an important Marcher lord castle in the 12th century, with an extensive castle-guard system. Became a hunting lodge in the 14th century.
Haughmond Abbey	Abbey	early 12th century	Ruins		A medieval, Augustinian monastery, was closely associated with the FitzAlan family, who became Earls of Arundel, and some of their wealthier vassals and allies. It was a substantial and wealthy house until evidence of abuses appeared before its dissolution in 1539. The buildings fell into disrepair and the church was largely destroyed.
Iron Bridge	Bridge	1777–1781	Complete		The first major bridge in the world to be made of cast iron. It crosses the River Severn and is celebrated as a symbol of the Industrial Revolution.
Langley Chapel	Chapel	1601	Complete		An Anglican church, noted for having a complete set of original 17th-century wooden furniture, and its lack of a chancel. A Grade I listed building.
Lilleshall Abbey	Abbey	1145–1148	Remains		An Augustinian abbey that followed the austere customs of the Abbey of Arrouaise in northern France. It suffered from bad financial difficulties and just escaped the Dissolution of the Lesser Monasteries in 1536, before going into voluntary dissolution in 1538.
Mitchell's Fold Stone Circle	Stone circle	Bronze Age	Remains		The stone circle, a standing stone, and a cairn comprise a Scheduled Ancient Monument. Its true history is unknown.
Moreton Corbet Castle	Castle	early thirteenth century	Ruins		A Grade I listed building, from two different eras: a medieval stronghold and an Elizabethan era manor house. Built by Toret, an Englishman, his descendant Peter Toret was lord of Moreton Corbet by 1166. It has been out of use since the 18th century.
Old Oswestry Hill Fort	Hillfort	early Iron Age	Remains		The earthworks, which remain one of the best-preserved hill forts in the UK, have been described as "The Stonehenge of the Iron Age Period". After the hill fort was abandoned, it was incorporated into Wat's Dyke by the Mercians during the early medieval period.
Stokesay Castle	Castle	late 13th century	Complete		It was largely built by Laurence de Ludlow, on the earlier castle (some of which still survives) founded by its original owners the de Lacy family, from whom it passed to their de Verdun heirs, who retained feudal overlordship of Stokesay until at least 1317.
Wenlock Priory	Priory	12th century	Ruins		Part of the Cluniac order, which was refounded in 1079 and 1082, on the site of an earlier 7th-century monastery, by Roger de Montgomery. Thought to be the final resting place of Saint Milburga, whose bones were reputedly discovered during restoration work in 1101.
White Ladies Priory	Priory	circa 680	Ruins		Dissolved in 1536, it became famous for its role in the escape of Charles II of England after the Battle of Worcester in 1651. The name 'White Ladies' refers to the Augustinian canonesses who lived there and who wore white religious habits.
Wroxeter Roman City	Town	Roman	Remains		Viroconium or Uriconium, formally Viroconium Cornoviorum. At its peak, Viroconium is estimated to have been the fourth-largest Roman settlement in Britain, a civitas with a population of more than 15,000. The settlement probably lasted until the end of the 7th century or the beginning of the 8th.

== Somerset ==
Name	Type	Date	Condition	Image	Notes
Cleeve Abbey	Abbey	1198	Parts survive		Located near the village of Washford, Cleeve Abbey was founded as a house for monks of the Cistercian order. It was closed in 1536 and the abbey was converted into a country house.
Dunster Butter Cross	Standing cross	15th century	Ruined		A transplanted stump of a medieval stone cross, once a meeting place for butter-sellers.
Dunster Gallox Bridge	Bridge	15th century	Complete		An ancient stone bridge which once carried packhorses bringing fleeces to Dunster market.
Dunster Yarn Market	Market hall	17th century	Complete		A 17th-century timber-framed octagonal market hall in the village of Dunster.
Farleigh Hungerford Castle	Castle	14th century	Ruined		Started in the 14th century, this fortified mansion was occupied for 300 years by the Hungerford family. Much of it was broken up for salvage in the 18th century. The castle chapel was repaired in 1779 and became a museum of curiosities, complete with the murals rediscovered on its walls in 1844.
Glastonbury Tribunal	Town house	15th century	Complete		A late-15th-century town house, once mistakenly identified as a courtroom of Glastonbury Abbey. It now houses both the Tourist Information Centre and the Glastonbury Lake Village Museum.
Meare Fish House	Fish house	14th century	Complete		The only surviving monastic fishery building in England, this housed the Abbot of Glastonbury's water bailiff and provided facilities for fish-salting and drying.
Muchelney Abbey	Abbey	12th century	Ruined		Once a wealthy Benedictine house and the second oldest religious foundation in Somerset, but as part of the dissolution the abbey's principal buildings were demolished by Henry VIII in 1538. The foundations of the abbey are laid out with parts of the cloister walk and thatched monks' lavatory. The 16th-century abbots' house remains intact.
Nunney Castle	Castle	14th century	Ruined		A moated castle built in the 1370s. Extensively modernised in the late 16th century, the castle was held for the king during the Civil War, but quickly fell to Parliamentarian cannon in 1645: not until Christmas Day 1910, however, did the gun-damaged portion of the wall finally collapse.
Sir Bevil Grenville's Monument	Monument	1720	Complete		Erected on Lansdowne Hill, Bath, to commemorate the heroism of Sir Bevil Grenville and his Cornish pikemen at the Battle of Lansdowne in 1643,
Stanton Drew Circles and Cove	Henge	Neolithic	Parts survive		The three circles and a stone cove near the village of Stanton Drew, are the third largest collection of prehistoric standing stones in England. The Great Circle probably consisted of 30 stones, of which 27 survive today, and was surrounded by the ditch (now filled in) of a henge. It lies between two smaller circles, while to the west is a cove of three stones standing in the garden of a public house.
Stoney Littleton Long Barrow	Megalithic tomb	Neolithic	Mostly complete		A Neolithic chambered tomb with multiple burial chambers, located near the village of Wellow, Somerset. It is an example of the Severn-Cotswold tomb. The barrow is about 30m in length and stands nearly 3m high. Internally it contains a gallery with three pairs of side chambers and an end chamber.

== South Yorkshire ==
Name	Type	Date	Condition	Image	Notes
Brodsworth Hall and Gardens	Country House	1861–1863	Complete		A Victorian country house which was designed in the Italianate style by the London architect, Philip Wilkinson. He was commissioned by Charles Sabine Augustus Thellusson, who had demolished the original Georgian house of 1713. It is a Grade I listed building.
Conisbrough Castle	Castle	11th century	Ruins		Built by William de Warenne, the Earl of Surrey, after the Norman conquest of England in 1066. Hamelin Plantagenet acquired the property in the late 12th century. Hamelin and his son, rebuilt the castle in stone and its keep. It remained in the family line into the 14th century, despite being seized several times by the Crown. The fortification was then given to Edmund of Langley, passing back into royal ownership in 1461.
Monk Bretton Priory	Priory	1154	Ruins		Originally a monastery under the Cluniac order, located in the village of Lundwood. It was founded as the Priory of St. Mary Magdelene of Lund by Adam Fitswane, sited on the Lund, from Old Norse. It closed on 30 November 1538 during the dissolution.
Roche Abbey	Abbey	1147	Ruins		Co-founded by Richard de Busli and Richard FitzTurgis for the monks from Newminster Abbey in Northumberland. They chose the side of the stream that runs through the valley to build their Cistercian monastery. Twenty-five years later, the Norman Gothic great church, dedicated to the Virgin Mary, had been finished.

== Staffordshire ==
Name	Type	Date	Condition	Image	Notes
Croxden Abbey	Abbey	1179	Ruins		A Cistercian abbey, it is the daughter house of the abbey in Aunay-sur-Odon, Normandy. The abbey was founded by Bertram III de Verdun of Alton Castle, Staffordshire and was dissolved in 1538.
Wall Roman Site	Town	c. 50 CE	Remains		Letocetum is the ancient remains of a Roman settlement. It was an important military staging post and posting station near the junction of Watling Street, the Roman military road to north Wales, and Icknield (or Ryknild) Street

== Suffolk ==
Name	Type	Date	Condition	Image	Notes
Bury St Edmunds Abbey	Abbey	11th and 12th centuries	Ruins		Once among the richest Benedictine monasteries in England, until the Dissolution of the monasteries in 1539. It was a centre of pilgrimage as the burial place of the Anglo-Saxon martyr-king Saint Edmund, killed by the Great Heathen Army of Danes in 869. Two very large medieval gatehouses survive.
Framlingham Castle	Castle	1213	Mostly complete		An early motte and bailey or ringwork Norman castle was built in 1148, then destroyed in the revolt of 1173–4. Its replacement, constructed by Roger Bigod, the Earl of Norfolk, but had no central keep, but instead used a curtain wall with thirteen mural towers to defend the centre of the castle.
Landguard Fort	Device Fort	1540	Complete		Designed to guard the entrance to the port of Harwich. Originally, a few earthworks and blockhouse, but James I of England ordered the construction of a square fort with bulwarks at each corner.
Leiston Abbey	Abbey	c. 1183	Ruins		a religious house of Canons Regular following the Premonstratensian rule (White canons), dedicated to St Mary. Founded by Ranulf de Glanville (c. 1112–1190), Chief Justiciar to King Henry II (1180-1189). It suffered from flooding and fires.
Moulton Packhorse Bridge	Bridge	ca. 1446	Complete		A packhorse (horses loaded with sidebags or panniers) bridge spanning the River Kennett. Had 18th-century alterations and has four pointed arches. The bridge is a grade II* listed structure and Scheduled Ancient Monument. It carries a public footpath.
Orford Castle	Castle	1165–1173	Complete		It was built by Henry II of England to consolidate royal power in the region. The well-preserved keep, is of a unique design and probably based on Byzantine architecture. The keep stands within the earth-bank remains of the castle's outer fortifications.
Saxtead Green Post Mill	Windmill	1796	Complete (but needs new sails)		A Grade II* listed post mill which is also an Ancient Monument and has been restored. It was raised a total of three times during its working life.
St James' Chapel, Lindsey	Chapel	1250	Complete		The chapel is a substantial building constructed of flint, brick and stone. It is a scheduled ancient monument and a designated Grade I listed building.

== Surrey ==
Name	Type	Date	Condition	Image	Notes
Farnham Castle Keep	Castle	1138	Remains		Built by Henri de Blois, Bishop of Winchester, grandson of William the Conqueror. Rebuilt in the late 12th and early 13th centuries. In the early 15th century, it was the residence of Cardinal Henry Beaufort.
Waverley Abbey	Abbey	1128	Ruins		The first Cistercian abbey in England, founded by William Giffard, the Bishop of Winchester. The monks are recorded as having endured poverty and famine. It was suppressed in 1536 as part of King Henry VIII's Dissolution of the Monasteries.

== Tyne and Wear ==
Name	Type	Date	Condition	Image	Notes
Bessie Surtees House	Townhouse	16th and 17th centuries	Complete		Two merchants' houses on Newcastle's Sandhill, near to the river, they were the site of the elopement of Bessie Surtees and John Scott, who later became Lord Chancellor.
Hadrian's Wall: Benwell Roman Temple & Vallum Crossing	Temple and Vallum	122–124 AD	Remains		A small temple dedicated to Antenociticus, a local deity, cited near Condercum, a Roman fort, with the original causeway over the vallum, or rear ditch around the fort.
Hadrian's Wall: Denton Hall Turret	Turret	122 AD	Remains		Made from sandstone, part of the wall. It was one of the structures garrisoned by soldiers based at the Condercum fort in Benwell.
Hylton Castle	Castle	c. 1390	Complete		Originally built from wood by the Hilton (later Hylton) family after the Norman Conquest in 1066, it was later rebuilt in stone. It underwent major changes to its interior and exterior in the 18th century and it stayed in the Hylton family until the death of the last Baron in 1746.
St Paul's Monastery, Jarrow	Priory	AD 674–5	Complete		A Benedictine double monastery. First house was St Peter's, Monkwearmouth, followed by St Paul's, Jarrow in 684–5. The abbey became the centre of Anglo-Saxon learning, producing the greatest Anglo-Saxon scholar, Bede.
Tynemouth Priory & Castle	Castle and Priory	13–14th century	Ruins		The moated castle-towers, gatehouse and keep are combined with the ruins of the Benedictine priory where three early kings of Northumbria were buried. Oswin, king of Deira in 651, Osred II, king of Northumbria in 792, and Malcolm III, king of Scotland in 1093.

== Warwickshire ==
Name	Type	Date	Condition	Image	Notes
Kenilworth Castle	Castle	1120s	Remains		It was enlarged by King John at the beginning of the 13th century. It was the subject of the six-month-long siege in 1266, and formed a base for Lancastrian operations in the Wars of the Roses. Then John of Gaunt in the late 14th century, turned the medieval castle into an expensive palace fortress.

== West Midlands ==
Name	Type	Date	Condition	Image	Notes
Halesowen Abbey	Abbey	1218	Ruins		A Premonstratensian abbey founded by Peter des Roches with a grant of land from King John. It acquired two daughter abbeys, a dependent priory and other estates. The abbey was moderately prosperous and survived the suppression of the lesser monasteries. It was dissolved in 1538.
J. W. Evans Silver Factory	Factory	1881	Complete		In Birmingham's historic Jewellery Quarter, a silverware factory founded by Jenkin Evans and remained with the Evans family for four generations. Originally, a converted terrace house before he acquired four other houses to make the factory.

== West Sussex ==
Name	Type	Date	Condition	Image	Notes
Boxgrove Priory	Priory	1123	Ruins		Founded by Robert de Haia, Lord of Halnacre by gift of King Henry I. A Saxon church had existed on the site before the Conquest. The Priory was founded for three Benedictine monks, and was owned by the Lessay Abbey in Normandy.
Bramber Castle	Castle	1070	Ruins		A Norman motte-and-bailey castle formerly the caput of the large feudal barony of Bramber long held by William de Braose, 1st Lord of Bramber. It was confiscated by King John (1199–1216), but returned to the Braose family until 1326.

== Wiltshire ==
Name	Type	Date	Condition	Image	Notes
Alexander Keiller Museum	Barn and Museum	17th century	Complete		Founded by archaeologist and businessman Alexander Keiller in 1938, the collections feature artifacts mostly of Neolithic and Early Bronze Age date, with other items from the Anglo-Saxon and later periods, found at Avebury.
Avebury	Henge	Neolithic	Remains		A monument containing three stone circles. One of the best known prehistoric sites in Britain, it contains the largest megalithic stone circle in the world. It is both a tourist attraction and a place of religious importance to contemporary pagans.
Bradford-on-Avon Tithe Barn	Tithe barn	14th century	Complete		Also known as the Saxon Tithe Barn, 180 feet long and 30 feet wide and is now part of Barton Farm Country Park. The barn would have been used for collecting taxes, in the form of goods, to fund the church. It is Grade II* listed.
Bratton Camp	Hillfort	Iron Age	Remains		A bivallate (two ramparted) hill fort which comprises two circuits of ditch and bank which together enclose a pentagonal area of 9.3 hectares (23 acres).
Chisbury Chapel	Chapel	13th century	Remains		Built next to a manor house on the edge of Chisbury Camp, an Iron Age hillfort. There are written records of it from 1246 onwards and its surviving architecture is contemporary with that period. The walls are faced with flint.
Hatfield Earthworks	Henge	Neolithic	Remains		The largest henge enclosure discovered to date in the UK. Oval in design, it covers 35 acres. Accounts of the site describe a huge mound within the enclosure called Hatfield Barrow, which collapsed after excavation by William Cunnington in the early 19th century. It has been damaged by ploughing, and no longer has any standing stones.
Ludgershall Castle	Castle	12th century	Ruins		A fortified royal residence which was turned into a hunting lodge by Henry III but fell into disuse by the 15th century. Three large walls still remain of the castle, it was listed as a Scheduled Ancient Monument in 1981.
Ludgershall Cross	Standing cross	Medieval	Remains		A former preaching cross that was re-erected some time in the early 19th century in the area that formed the old market place, near the present Queen's Head pub at the end of High Street. It is some 12 feet in height and in 1897, to celebrate the Diamond Jubilee of Queen Victoria, an ornamental iron fence was erected around the cross. The cross has carved representations on four sides but they are badly eroded.
Netheravon Dovecote	Dovecote	18th century	Complete		Built in the grounds to the north of Netheravon house, which was built after 1734 as a hunting box for Henry Scudamore, Duke of Beaufort.
Old Sarum Castle	Hillfort, castle	3000 BC	Remains		An Iron Age hillfort was erected on the site around 400 BC, which controlled the intersection of two native trade paths and the Hampshire Avon. The Normans constructed a motte and bailey castle, a stone curtain wall, and a great cathedral. Later, the settlement was largely abandoned and Edward II ordered the castle's demolition in 1322.
Old Wardour Castle	Castle	1390s	Ruins		The castle built by John, the fifth Baron Lovell, its design was inspired by the hexagonal (6-sided) castles of the Continent. It later owned by the Arundells in the 16th century and was rendered uninhabitable in 1643 and 1644 during the English Civil War.
The Sanctuary	Stone circle	Late Neolithic and Early Bronze Age	Remains		Excavation on the site has revealed the location of the 58 stone sockets and 62 post-holes. The stones were destroyed by local farmers in the 1720s. It was seen by antiquarian William Stukeley on 8 July 1723.
Silbury Hill	Tumulus	c.2400 – 2300 BC	Remains		A prehistoric artificial chalk mound which is part of the Stonehenge, Avebury and Associated Sites UNESCO World Heritage Site. At 39.3 metres (129 ft) high, it is the tallest prehistoric man-made mound in Europe and one of the largest in the world; similar in size to some of the smaller Egyptian pyramids.
Stonehenge	Henge	3000 BC – 2000 BC	Ruins		Consists of an outer ring of vertical Sarsen standing stones, weighing around 25 tons, topped by connecting horizontal lintel stones. Inside is a ring of smaller bluestones. Inside these are free-standing trilithons, two bulkier vertical Sarsens joined by one lintel. It is oriented towards the sunrise on the summer solstice. The stones are set within earthworks in the middle of the most dense complex of Neolithic and Bronze Age monuments.
West Kennet Avenue	Avenue	2200 BC	Remains		An avenue of two parallel lines of stones 25 m wide and 2.5 km in length, which ran between the Neolithic sites of Avebury and The Sanctuary. Excavations in the 1930s indicated that around 100 pairs of standing stones had lined the avenue but many stones have since fallen or are missing.
West Kennet Long Barrow	Megalithic tomb	37th century BCE	Restored remains		A chambered long barrow, probably constructed in Early Neolithic period and consisted of a sub-rectangular earthen tumulus enclosed by kerb-stones. Excavated in 1859 and again in 1955–56, after which it underwent reconstruction.
Westbury White Horse	Hill figure	Unknown,	Restored		It is the oldest of several white horses carved in Wiltshire. It was restored in 1778, an action which may have obliterated another horse that had occupied the same slope but looking the other way according to an engraving.
Windmill Hill	Enclosure	Around 3800 BC	Remains		It is the largest known causewayed enclosure in Britain, an area of 21 acres (8.5 ha). In c. 3300 BC, three concentric segmented ditches were placed around the hilltop site.
Woodhenge	Henge	Neolithic	Remains		Class II henge and timber circle monument, found in the 19th century, then re-found in 1926 by aerial photography. The site consists of six concentric oval rings of postholes, the outermost being about 43 by 40 metres (141 by 131 ft) wide.

== Worcestershire ==
Name	Type	Date	Condition	Image	Notes
Leigh Court Barn	Tithe barn	1325	Complete		A cruck framed barn built in the early fourteenth century to store produce for Pershore Abbey. It is the largest and one of the oldest cruck barns in Britain.
Witley Court	Country House	1655	Ruins		An Italianate mansion. Built for the Foleys on the site of a former manor house, it was enormously expanded in the early nineteenth century by the architect John Nash for Thomas Foley, 3rd Baron Foley. Then later sold to the Earls of Dudley, who undertook a second massive reconstruction in the mid-19th century, employing the architect Samuel Daukes to create one of the great palaces of Victorian and Edwardian England.

== See also ==
- List of Cadw properties (Wales)
- List of Historic Scotland properties
- List of abbeys and priories
- List of castles
- List of Conservation topics
- List of historic houses
- List of museums
- List of National Trust properties in England
