= Peter Mills (1598–1670) =

Peter Mills was an English bricklayer.

== Life and work ==
Mills was baptised on 12 February 1597/8 in East Dean, Sussex, where his father was a tailor. In 1613 he was apprenticed to John Williams, a tyler and bricklayer in London. In 1643 he became Bricklayer to the City of London and was Master of the Tylers' and Bricklayers' Company in 1649-50 and 1659-60.

In about 1640 he probably designed a row of houses on the south side of Great Queen Street, London, decorated with Corinthian pilasters. He may have been the designer of certain works at Forde Abbey, Dorset, for Sir Edmund Prideaux in about 1650. Prideaux became Attorney General for Oliver Cromwell and was MP for Lyme Regis and "Master of the Posts, Messengers, and Couriers". It has also been suggested that Prideaux's architect at Forde was Edward Carter, a deputy of Inigo Jones.

In 1653 he designed Thorpe Hall near Peterborough for Oliver St John, Oliver Cromwell's Lord Chief Justice. The final design involved the input of John Stone, a French-trained son of Nicholas Stone. The panelled interior of the Great Parlour, which seems to be Mills' work, was removed and installed in 1926 in a drawing room at Leeds Castle for Olive, Lady Baillie.

He probably designed the Hitcham Building in 1659-1661 at Pembroke College, Cambridge. In 1661 he helped design triumphal arches in London for the coronation of King Charles II. In 1661-1663 he remodelled the Cross Wing at Cobham Hall, Kent, for the third Duke of Richmond.

After the Great Fire of London of 1666 Mills was appointed as one of the four surveyors to rebuild London.
