= Thorpe Hall (Peterborough) =

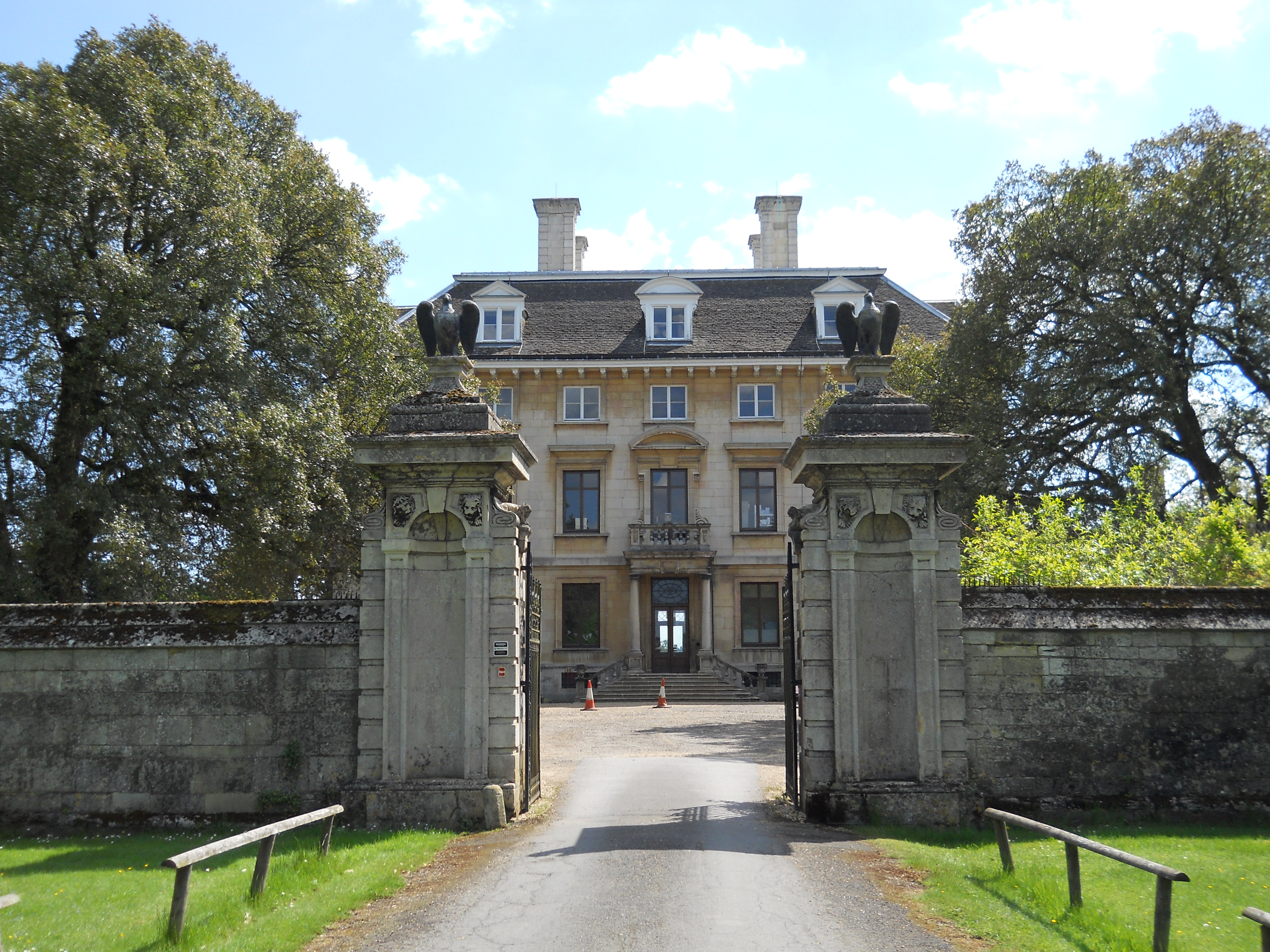

- Location within Cambridgeshire
- 52°34′21.5″N 0°16′27.5″W
- Location: Longthorpe
- OS grid reference: TL1705098600

History
- Built: 1653-1656
- Built for: Oliver St John

Site notes
- Architect: Peter Mills

Listed Building – Grade I
- Official name: Thorpe Hall; Former stables to Thorpe Hall; Gateway from garden to stables of Thorpe Hall
- Designated: 7 February 1952
- Reference no.: 1126912; 1126913; 1126914

Listed Building – Grade I
- Official name: Walls, gatepiers and entrance gates to Thorpe Hall
- Designated: 7 May 1973
- Reference no.: 1331545

Listed Building – Grade II
- Official name: Lodge to Thorpe Hall; Archway in garden of Thorpe Hall to the south west; Summerhouse in grounds of Thorpe Hall
- Designated: 7 May 1973
- Reference no.: 1161982; 1309857; 1331546

National Register of Historic Parks and Gardens
- Official name: Thorpe Hall
- Type: Grade II*
- Designated: 14 January 1988
- Reference no.: 1000139

Thorpe Hall at Longthorpe in the city of Peterborough, Cambridgeshire, is a Grade I listed building, built by Peter Mills between 1653 and 1656, for the Lord Chief Justice, Oliver St John. The house is unusual in being one of the very few mansions built during the Commonwealth period. After a period as a hospital, it is currently used as a Sue Ryder hospice.

While parliamentary soldiers were in Peterborough in 1643 during the English Civil War, they ransacked the cathedral. Parliament disposed of Church property to raise money for the army and navy and the parliamentarian Oliver St John bought the lease to the manor of Longthorpe and built Thorpe Hall. In 1654 it was described by the author John Evelyn as "a stately place...built out of the ruins of the Bishop's Palace and cloisters."

A symmetrical composition in ashlar, rusticated quoins, with square, groups of rusticated chimney shafts; the north and south elevations are identical, three dormers, casements under pediments, the centre one semi-circular. A stone slate roof overhangs on modillions. There are seven windows, with plain stone surrounds to top and ground floors. The porch with Tuscan columns supports a balcony. The balcony window on the first floor has a segmental pediment and shouldered architrave. The windows of the second and sixth bays have pediments, while the others have frieze and moulded cornice. A band marks first-floor height. There is a flight of eight steps with balustrade supporting two urns.

The interior is complete, except for library or Great Parlour panelling now at Leeds Castle. There may have been two designers, Mills and John Stone, a French-trained son of Nicholas Stone. Principal rooms have richly decorated fireplaces and plaster ceilings by Peter Mills. The principal staircase has heavily carved foliated open panels to broad balustrade. A stone screen on the landing was added in 1850 by Francis Ruddle of Peterborough.

Thorpe Hall is situated in a Grade II listed garden that is open to members of the public throughout the year. The curved walls forming the entrance courtyard, gatepiers and entrance gates, former stables to the right, and a shouldered stone architrave gateway flanked by vertically halved pilasters with volutes are also Grade I listed buildings. The late 19th-century lodge, octagonal summerhouse in red brick with fish scale slate roof, and a free-standing archway resembling a Venetian window in design are Grade II listed buildings.

A maternity hospital from 1943 to 1970, it was transferred to the National Health Service in 1948, coming under No. 12 Group (Peterborough and Stamford Hospitals Management Committee) of the East Anglian Regional Hospital Board. In 1986 it was acquired by the Sue Ryder Foundation and is currently in use as a hospice.

== See also ==
- Longthorpe Tower
