= Longthorpe =

Area of Peterborough, England

Coordinates: 52.567°N 0.283°W

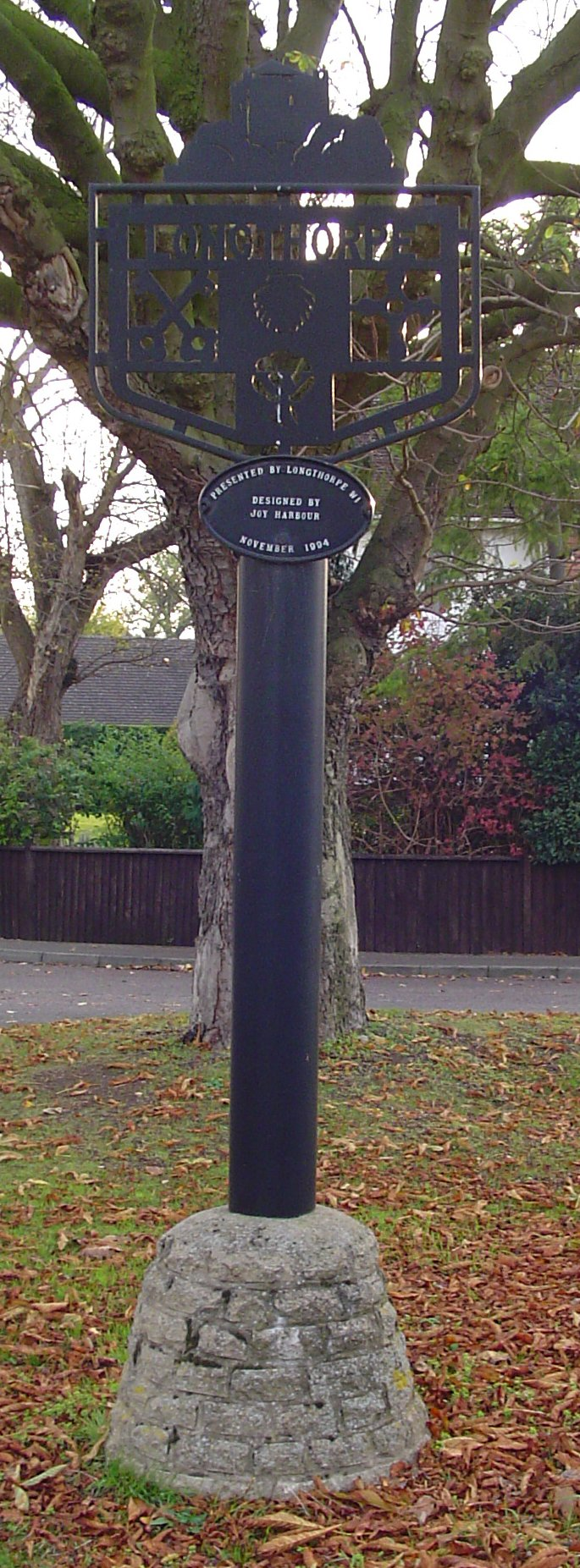
- Signpost in Longthorpe

- Location within Cambridgeshire
- Unitary authority: Peterborough
- Ceremonial county: Cambridgeshire
- Region: East
- Country: England
- Sovereign state: United Kingdom
- Post town: PETERBOROUGH
- Postcode district: PE3
- Dialling code: 01733

Longthorpe is an area of the city of Peterborough, in the ceremonial county of Cambridgeshire, England. Located two miles (3.2 km) west from the city centre, the area covers 1,390 acres (560 hectares). For electoral purposes it forms part of Peterborough West ward.

A 1st century Roman fort was established at Longthorpe, it may have been as early as around AD 44–48 but was certainly present by 61–62. The first phase covered 27 acres (11 ha), this was later replaced by another fort measuring 11 acres (4.5 ha).

The ecclesiastical parish was formed in 1850 from the parish of Saint John the Baptist. The church of Saint Botolph is a plain building of coarse rubble, dating from the 13th century, consisting of chancel, nave, aisles and a western bell cote, containing one bell. In the chancel is a piscina and aumbry, two other brackets and a piscina are in the south aisle and two brackets in the north aisle. The church was restored in 1869 and will seat about 200 persons. The register dates from the year 1837; the earlier register is included in that of St. John the Baptist, Peterborough. Objections to controversial works were raised by the Victorian Society, Historic England and the Twentieth Century Society in 2017.

Oliver St John, a Lord Chief Justice who supported Parliament in the English Civil War, bought the lease of the manor of Longthorpe and built Thorpe Hall. In 1654 it was described by the author John Evelyn as "a stately place...built out of the ruins of the Bishop's Palace and cloisters." It is a Grade I listed building, situated in a Grade II listed garden open to members of the public throughout the year.

Longthorpe Tower, a 14th-century, three-storey tower and fortified manor house in the care of English Heritage, is also situated here. A Grade I listed building and scheduled ancient monument protected by law, it contains the finest and most complete set of domestic paintings of the period in northern Europe. Exhibitions are held there from time to time by local artists.

Longthorpe contains a number of other listed buildings, including the old Manor House and the Holy (or St. Cloud's) Well to south-east of the Manor House.

Longthorpe Primary School is located in the village on Bradwell Road; secondary pupils attend nearby Jack Hunt School in Netherton.

== Civil parish ==
Longthorpe was formerly a chapelry in Peterborough-St. John-the-Baptist parish, from 1 November 1908 Longthorpe was a civil parish in its own right (being formed from Peterborough Without) until it was abolished on 1 April 1929 and merged with Peterborough. In 1921 the parish had a population of 274.

== See also ==
- Thorpe Wood
