= Windmill Tump =

Neolithic burial site in Gloucestershire, England

Coordinates: 51.6744°N 2.0989°W

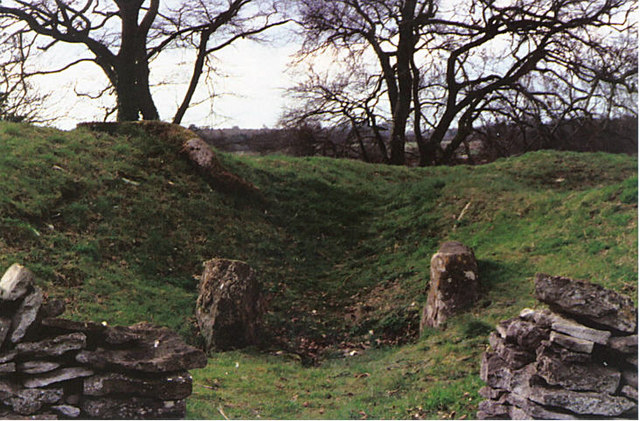
Entrance stones to the barrow

Windmill Tump, also known as Rodmarton Chambered Tomb, is a Neolithic burial site, a stone tumulus or barrow. It is a mound covering the site of graves, in the form of a cairn, located in Gloucestershire. It lies to the west of the village of Rodmarton, south of the road between Cherington and Tarlton. There are trees growing on the site.

== Description ==
It is approximately 21 metres (69 ft) wide and 60 metres (200 ft) long, and is oriented from east to west. The construction consists of approximately 5,000 tons of stone, under a mound. The only portion of the stones that can still be seen is a fake entrance, which lies at the eastern side of the mound.

The site is managed by Gloucestershire County Council, under the guardianship of English Heritage.

== Excavations ==
Digging took place in 1863, and again in 1939, after which the mound was restored.

The site contains two tombs, behind the false entrance, with passageways to the north and south. The tombs contained the remains of ten adults and three children. Animal remains were also uncovered, including boar tusks, horse teeth, and calf jawbones.

Two tombstones were unearthed in the first dig, and these are approximately 8 feet 6 inches (2.59 m) in height, and a third and larger stone was leaning against them, seemingly placed in that position. It was noted at the time that this specific arrangement was similar to cromlech mounds in Kilkenny, Ireland, and in Cornwall. The third stone may have been placed in this manner for use in sacrifices.

Evidence of structured walls to support the cairn were also discovered. with a double-thickness wall surrounding the entire structure and further walls providing strength in a transverse direction.

== Etymology ==
There is no evidence that a windmill ever existed in the location; instead, one possible etymology derives from the word Nant from Nantoush, meaning "The diffuser of fire or light", and the English word win which has similar meaning.
