= Blackbury Camp =

Iron Age hill fort in Devon, England

Coordinates: 50.7252°N 3.1527°W

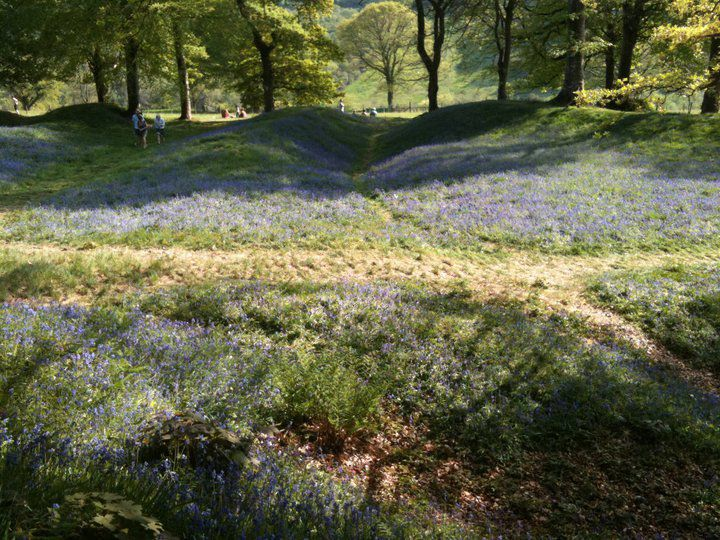
The south view of the barbican at Blackbury Camp

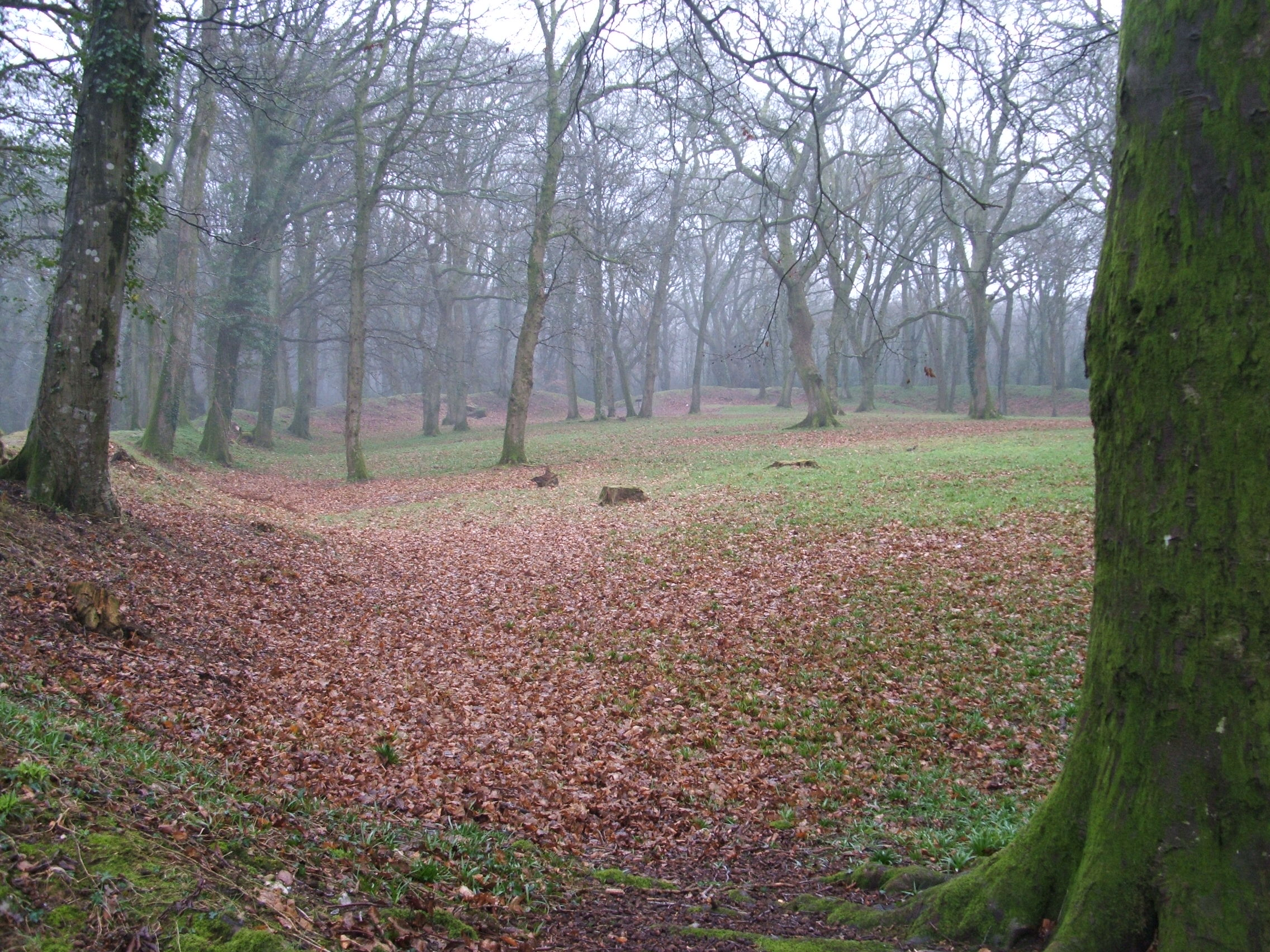
View of the ramparts from inside the site in winter.

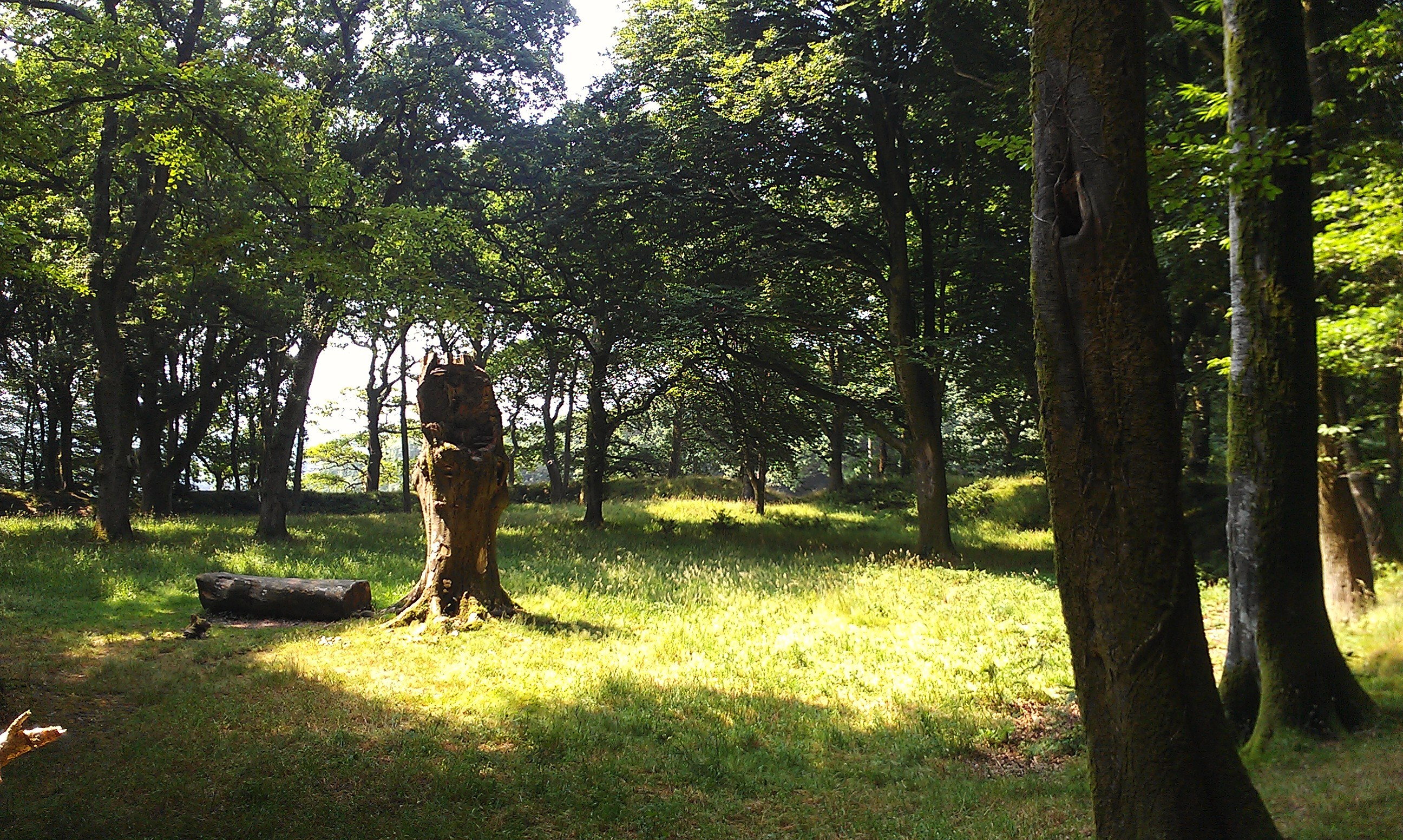
View of the Camp interior in summer.

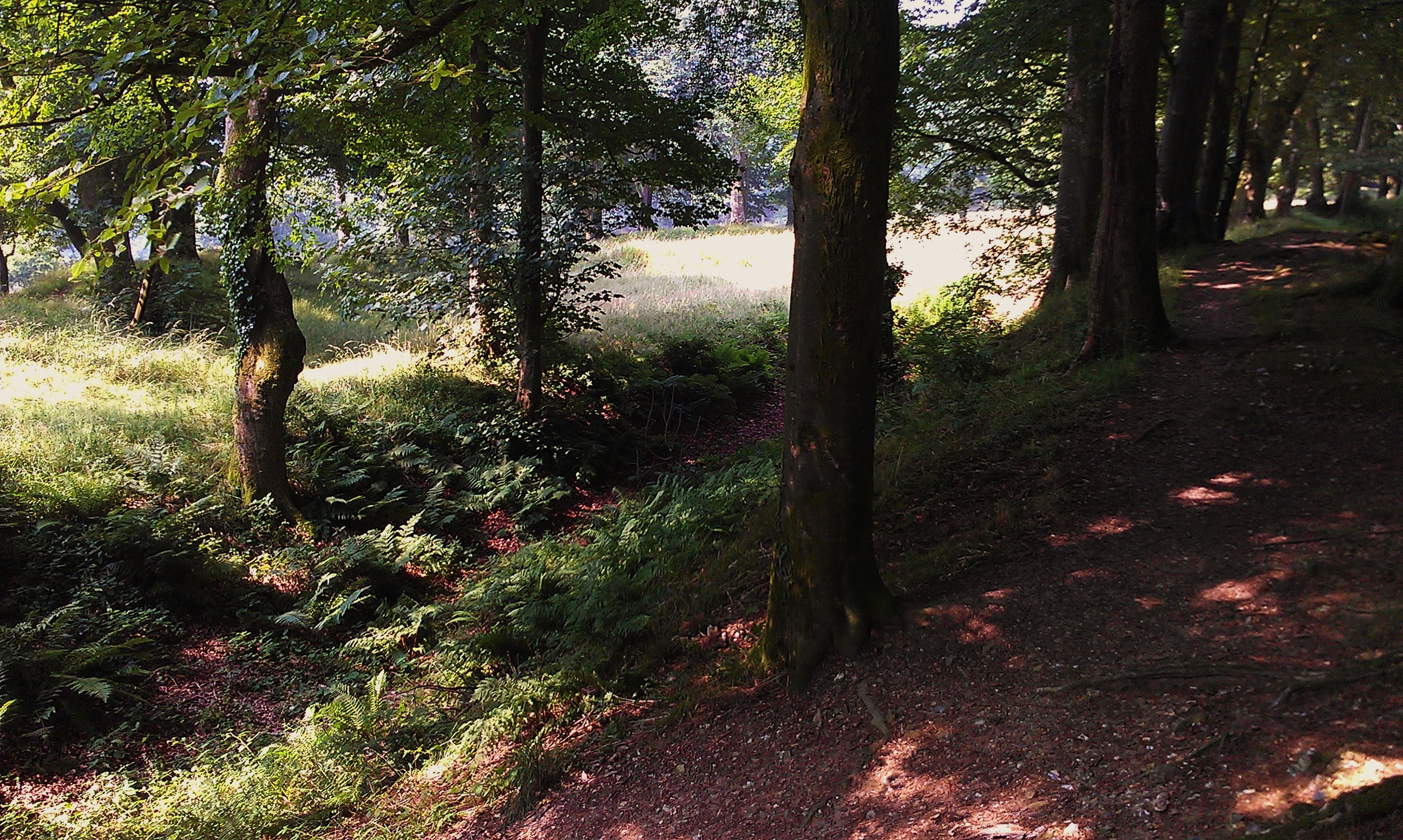
Ramparts at the Camp

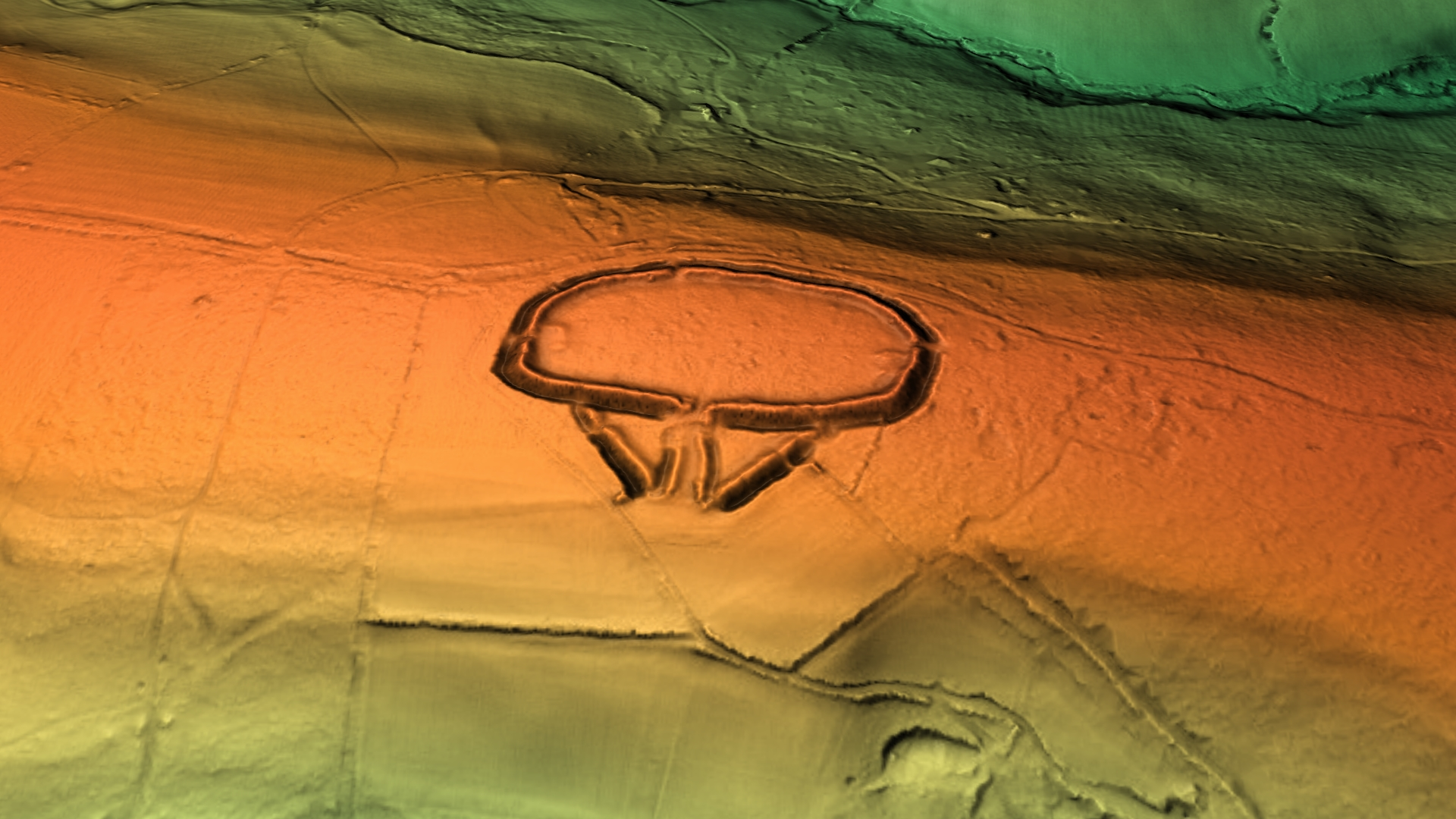
3D view of the digital terrain model

Blackbury Camp, also known as Blackbury Castle, is an Iron Age hill fort in Devon, England. It is managed by English Heritage.

== Location ==
Blackbury Camp is situated to the south west of Southleigh, Devon. It is to the west of Colyton and Seaton, and north of Branscombe. To its north is Wiscombe Park, a Gothic country house and hill climb course. The site is within the East Devon Area of Outstanding Natural Beauty.

== Description ==
Blackbury Camp sits on an east to west ridge overlooking valleys formed by tributaries of the River Coly, some 185 metres (607 ft) above sea level. The camp consists of an oval enclosure, around 200 metres (660 ft) long and 100 metres (330 ft) wide, which is surrounded by a rampart 3 metres (9.8 ft) high and up to 10 metres (33 ft) wide. The rampart was built from clay and flint quarried from a surrounding outer ditch which is up to 12 metres (39 ft) wide. Today the ditch contains up to 2 metres (6.6 ft) of silt, so the earthworks would have looked more imposing with a deeper ditch when they were built.

The camp has a single 5 metres (16 ft) wide entrance on the south side. Originally, the entrance had a gateway with wooden gates, possibly within a wooden gate-tower. The entrance was gravelled using pebbles from a nearby stream suggesting heavy usage was expected in the wetter seasons. The three other entrances are believed to have been built more recently than the Iron Age. In front of the entrance is a triangular earthwork, or barbican, flanked by a bank and ditch. It is not known whether this earthwork was a defensive structure or had a practical use such as holding cattle.

== History ==
From flint tools found at the site, it is known that the area was in use during the Late Neolithic or Bronze Age. Pottery found within the ramparts indicates that Blackbury Camp was built in the Middle Iron Age between 300 and 100 BC. The camp was likely in use for several hundred years. Some of the pottery finds suggest that activity may have continued as late as the first century BC, but there is no evidence that it was still in use by the time the Romans arrived in Britain. It is unknown whether the barbican was built at the same time as the main enclosure or added later.

Due to their size, it is believed that hill forts like Blackbury were centres for the local community, being large enough to shelter them and their livestock. However, it has also been argued that these camps were the defended homesteads of wealthier members of Iron Age society. It is not known whether the camp was lived in year round or only maintained for major community events. Two spindle whorls, made of local chert, found at the site suggest wool was being worked there, and the presence of iron slag shows that this metal was being smelted or smithed at the camp.

It is unknown what the landscape around the camp looked like during the Iron Age, but it is thought to have been a mix of woods, open grazing land and small fields.

== Excavations ==
Excavation of Blackbury Camp has been very limited and has not included any use of modern techniques such as geophysical surveying or radiocarbon dating. An excavation of the site was carried out in 1954-5 by Alison Young and Kitty Richardson, focused on the entrance and the area immediately within the enclosure. On the east side of the entrance, evidence was found for a wooden palisade, in the form of a series of post holes 90 centimetres (35 in) apart. Two larger post holes lined with flint on either side of the entrance were large enough to support gates and a walkway above them.

Within the enclosure, the remains of a hut were discovered, as well as a cooking pot, an oven, and Iron Age pottery made from local Greensand clays. A total of 1,271 slingstones, individually weighing between 57g and 78g, were also found, the majority of them near to the entrance. This find suggests that defence was at least one reason for building the camp.
