= Knights Templar Church, Dover =

Coordinates: 51°07′09″N 1°18′12″E

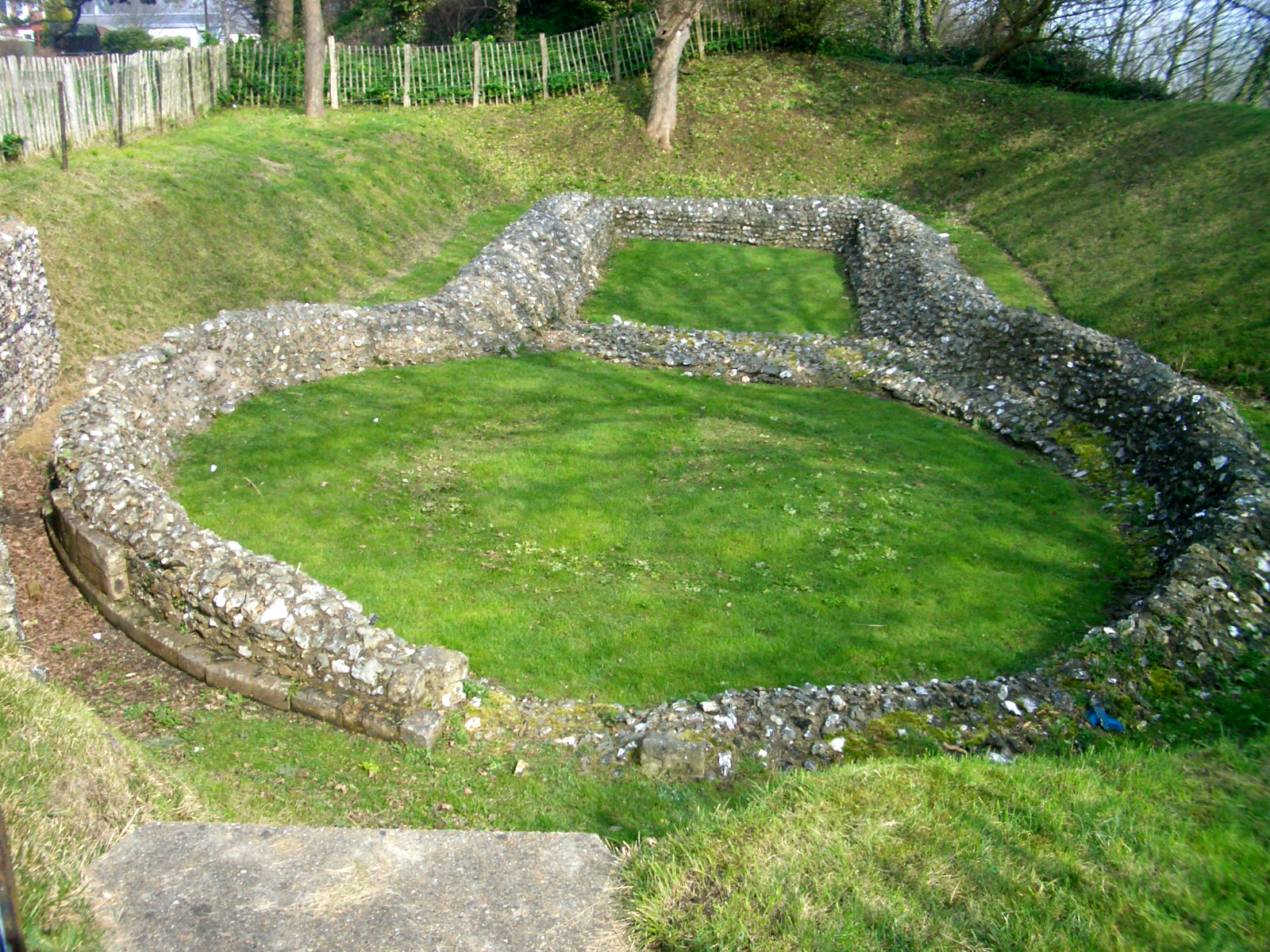
- Knights Templar Church, Dover

- Knights Templar Church location in Kent
- OS grid reference: TR 31288 40719

History
- Built: 11th Century
- Built for: Templars

Scheduled monument
- Official name: Fortifications, Roman lighthouse and medieval chapel on Western Heights
- Designated: 8 August 1962
- Reference no.: 1020298

The Knights Templar Church in Dover is the ruins of a medieval church on Bredenstone hill, part of the Dover Western Heights in Kent, England. It has been designated by English Heritage as a scheduled monument.

== History ==
The church followed the same plan as the New Temple Church in London but smaller in scale. For reasons of its design, it has been linked to the Templars, but it is not listed as belonging to the Order in surviving records. If it were a Templar church, it was possibly used before they established a church at Temple Ewell in 1170, and built the Norman church of St Peter and St Paul, but it is more likely to have been a simple roadside shrine.

In 1309, Ralph de Malton was the preceptor of the church at Temple Ewell.

It was discovered in 1806 during the construction of the fortifications on Dover Western Heights. According to Matthew Paris the Templar church at Dover was the site of King John's submission to the papal legate Pandulph in May 1213, but this almost certainly relates to Temple Ewell.

The church has a circular nave, 10 metres in diameter, and an oblong chancel. Built mainly of flint rubble with ashlar facings. This unusual form mirrors that of the Church of the Holy Sepulchre in Jerusalem.

== See also ==
- Catholic Church in England
