= Longthorpe Tower =

House in Peterborough, Cambridgeshire, England

- Longthorpe, England
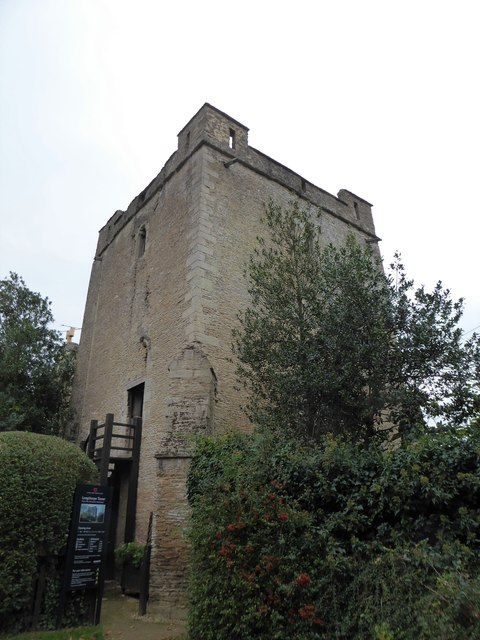
- Longthorpe Tower

Site information
- Type: Tower
- Owner: English Heritage
- Open to the public: Yes
- Condition: Intact

Location
- Shown within Cambridgeshire
- Location within Cambridgeshire
- Coordinates: 52.5708°N 0.2869°W
- Grid reference: grid reference TL16209838

Site history
- Materials: Stone

Longthorpe Tower is a 14th-century three-storey tower in the Longthorpe area of Peterborough, Cambridgeshire, England. It is famous for its well-preserved set of medieval murals.

== Details ==
Longthorpe tower is located in the village of Longthorpe, now a residential area of Peterborough in the United Kingdom, about two miles (3 km) to the west of the city centre. At the start of the 14th century, Robert Thorpe built the tower as an extension to an existing fortified manor house.

Thorpe had worked his way to relative wealth through the local Peterborough Abbey, and the tower may have been something of a status symbol.

The tower has three stories, and the first floor was originally designed as a living space for Thorpe.

The tower is best known for its English medieval wall paintings, carried out around 1330. The paintings show religious, secular and moral themes and the quality is comparatively good for a provincial work. The paintings were whitewashed over around the time of the Reformation and remained hidden until their rediscovery in the 1940s. Historian Clive Rouse considers that "no comparable scheme...of such completeness and of such early date exists in England".

The property is now owned by English Heritage and is a Grade I listed building and a Scheduled Monument protected by law.

== See also ==
- Castles in Great Britain and Ireland
- List of castles in England
- Thorpe Hall

== Bibliography ==
- Emery, Anthony. (2006) Greater Medieval Houses of England and Wales, 1300–1500: Southern England. Cambridge: Cambridge University Press. ISBN 978-0-521-58132-5.
- Pettifer, Adrian. (2002) English Castles: a Guide by Counties. Woodbridge, UK: Boydell Press. ISBN 978-0-85115-782-5.
- Pounds, Norman John Greville. (1994) The Medieval Castle in England and Wales: a social and political history. Cambridge: Cambridge University Press. ISBN 978-0-521-45828-3.
