= Milecastle 26 =

Milecastle on Hadrian's Wall, England

- Northumberland, England, UK
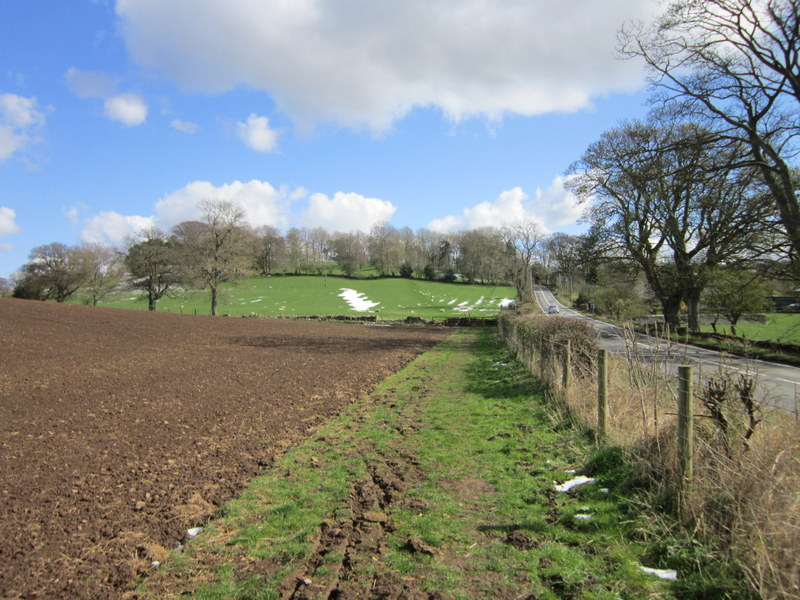
- Looking towards the site of Milecastle 26 on Hadrian's Wall Path

Location
- Location in Northumberland
- Coordinates: 55.020461°N 2.109670°W
- Grid reference: NY93086955

Milecastle 26 (Planetrees) was a milecastle of the Roman Hadrian's Wall. Its position is slightly to the south of, but mostly covered by the B6318 Military Road., and it is located around 700 metres (0.43 miles) east of the B6318 Military Road's junction with the A6079. No visible traces exist currently. The dimensions are the same as Milecastles 23, 24, and 25.

== Construction ==
Measuring 15.24 metres (50.0 ft) across, Milecastle 26 was a long-axis milecastle with unknown gateway type. Such milecastles were thought to have been constructed by the Legio VI Victrix who were based in Eboracum (York).

A causeway over the wall ditch (not necessarily primary) may have existed at the location of the milecastle.

The curtain wall is broad at this point, though changes to narrow gauge between here and Turret 26A, at an extant section of the curtain wall known as Planetrees. Also, in 1956, two iron wedges for splitting stones (260 millimetres (10 in) long) were discovered in the rubble and mortar core behind the north facing stones of the wall in a trench cut beside the farm.

== Excavations and investigations ==
- 1930 – The Milecastle was excavated on 5 February by Miss T Hepple. The location and dimensions were established, and the site was sketched.
- 1966 – Field Investigation by the Ministry of Public Building and Works, a precursor of English Heritage. It was noted that there were no visible remains, and that the site was mainly covered by a modern road. The milecastle was resited on the Ordnance Survey 25" map, from Hepple's 1930 sketch.
- 1989 – English Heritage Field Investigation. It was noted that there were no visible remains and that the site was mainly occupied by the modern road and the garden of "Planetrees".

== Associated turrets ==
Each milecastle on Hadrian's Wall had two associated turret structures. These turrets were positioned approximately one-third and two-thirds of a Roman mile to the west of the Milecastle, and would probably have been manned by part of the milecastle's garrison. The turrets associated with Milecastle 26 are known as Turret 26A and Turret 26B.

=== Turret 26A ===
Turret 26A (High Brunton) was located adjacent to the B6318 Military Road, opposite High Brunton House, by Miss T Hepple (in 1930). Subsequent examination in 1959 revealed a turret with an original floor of clay and mortar, which had been overlain in part by stone. It had twice been resurfaced with sand, and twice with flags, a new hearth being established on each occasion. A small area, delineaeted by kerbs, existed throughout the life of the turret, though its usage remains unknown. Finds indicating evidence of bronze casting where unearthed, including a crucible and a whetstone. Fragments of pottery including those of two flagons and one amphora where found. Unusually, some of these fragments were identified to have been manufactured by Legio VI Victrix near York around 120AD, suggesting they may have built the turret. No finds at the site indicated occupation later than the second century. Brunton Bank Quarry, a geological Site of Special Scientific Interest lies 0.2 miles (0.32 km) north of Turret 26A.

Location on Ordnance Survey 1:25 000 map: 55.021668°N 2.116305°W

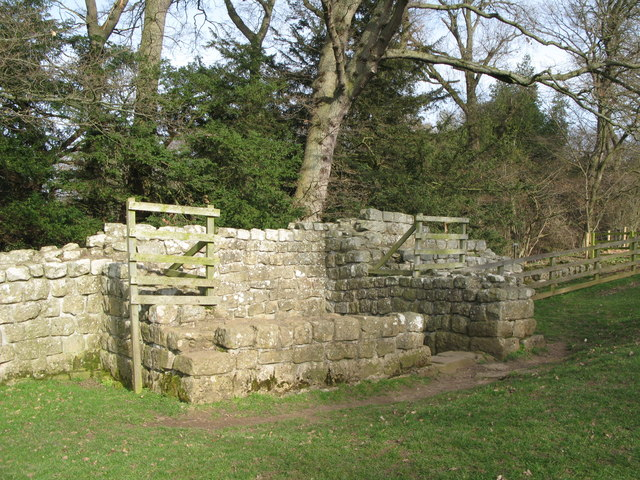
Remains of Brunton Turret

=== Turret 26B ===
Turret 26B (Brunton) is located just to the west of Brunton House, between it and the A6079. It is preserved with upstanding remains up to 2.8 metres (9.2 ft) high, and forms part of a 69 metres (75 yd) extant section of Hadrian's Wall. Within the turret is a free-standing altar. The turret was first excavated by John Clayton during 1873 and later by T. Hepple in 1930. It has since been consolidated.

The turret measures 3.88 metres (12.7 ft) by 3.5 metres (11 ft) internally, and is recessed about 1.22 metres (4.0 ft) into the wall. It has a doorway nearly 1.22 metres (4.0 ft) wide. The side walls of the turret are 0.84 metres (2.8 ft) thick. Hadrian's Wall forms the north wall of the turret, which was standing eleven courses high in 1947. Its south wall is nearly 1.22 metres (4.0 ft) high. On the east side of the turret the broad wall wing is joined by a narrow section of wall, indicating that the turrets were built first and the Wall was then built up to them. Near to the turret a centurial stone was found in situ with the inscription COH IX > PAV.APRI ('The century of Paulus Aper of the ninth cohort').

Location on Ordnance Survey 1:25 000 map: 55.023025°N 2.124308°W

== Monument records ==
Monument	Monument Number	English Heritage Archive Number
Milecastle 26	18291	NY 96 NW 4
Turret 26A	18294	NY 96 NW 5
Turret 26B	18297	NY 96 NW 6

== Public access ==
The sites of Milecastle 26 and Turret 26A are accessible via the Hadrian's Wall National Trail. Turret 26B is accessible from the east side of the A6079, just south of its junction with the B6318 Military Road.

== Bibliography ==
- Daniels, Charles (1979), "Review: Fact and Theory on Hadrian's Wall", Britannia, 10: 357–364, doi:10.2307/526069, JSTOR 526069
