= Milecastle 29 =

Milecastle on Hadrian's Wall in England

- Northumberland, England
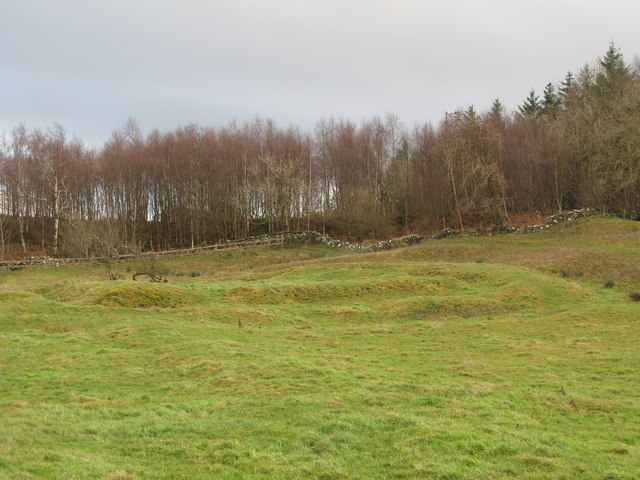
- The site of Milecastle 29

Location
- Location in Northumberland
- Coordinates: 55.034267°N 2.175435°W
- Grid reference: NY88887109

Milecastle 29 (Tower Tye) was a milecastle of the Roman Hadrian's Wall. Its remains exist as a mutilated earth platform accentuated by deep robber-trenches around all sides, and are located beside the B6318 Military Road. Like Milecastles 9, 23, 25, and 51, a ditch has been identified around the Milecastle, and is still visible to a small extent. It has been postulated that this was as a result of the need for drainage on the site.

== Construction ==
Milecastle 29 was a long-axis milecastle though the gateway type cannot be identified. Such milecastles were thought to have been constructed by the legio VI Victrix who were based in Eboracum (York), or by the legio XX Valeria Victrix who were based in Deva Victrix (Chester).

The milecastle was stated in 1840 as having dimensions of 63 feet (19 m) North-South by 58 feet (18 m) East-West with both southern corners (away from the wall) being rounded off.

The presence of a milecastle ditch is still evident, including a causeway crossing the ditch opposite the milecastle's south gate. A break in the north mound of the vallum and causeway over the vallum ditch (offset to the east) is also present. There is also disputable evidence of a causeway over the wall ditch opposite the milecastle's north gate.

== Excavations and investigations ==
- Pre-1732 – The milecastle is visited by John Horsley. He felt that the milecastle may be detached from the wall. No subsequent evidence supports this.
- 1840 – Rev John Hodgson reports the dimensions of the milecastle, and describes the southern corners as rounded.
- 1858 – Henry MacLauchlan reports that the milecastle's remains "have been long since demolished, and low banks covered with turf were left to indicate where the walls had been".
- 1957 – The 11th edition of the Handbook to the Roman Wall is published, noting that the milecastle was "long axis", and the presence of indications of an external ditch, in this case at the south-west angle, and also on the east side; the purpose possibly being for drainage.
- 1989 – English Heritage Field Investigation (as part of the Hadrian's Wall Project). It was noted that the milecastle survived as clearly defined robber trenches on all sides, and that the well-defined hollow of an external ditch existed at the south-west side.

== Associated turrets ==
Each milecastle on Hadrian's Wall had two associated turret structures. These turrets were positioned approximately one-third and two-thirds of a Roman mile to the west of the Milecastle, and would probably have been manned by part of the milecastle's garrison. The turrets associated with Milecastle 29 are known as Turret 29A and Turret 29B.

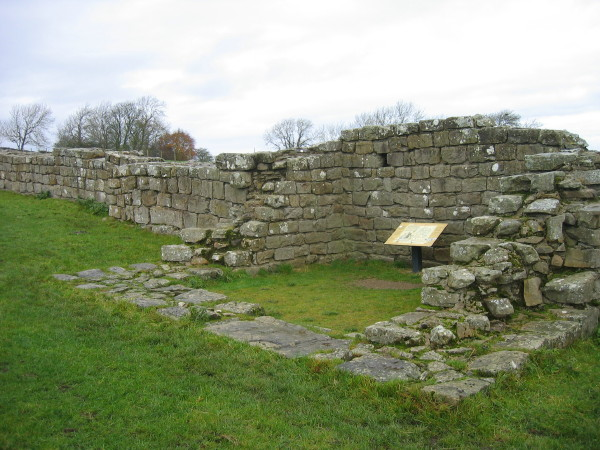
Turret 29A at Black Carts

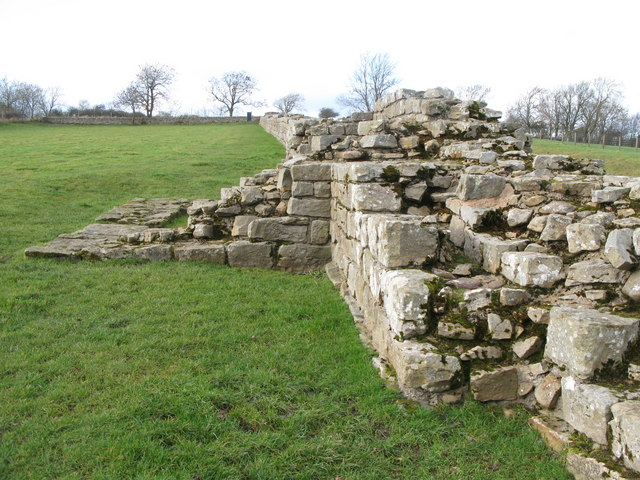
Join of the turret 29A's wing wall (broad gauge) to the narrow gauge curtain wall

=== Turret 29A ===
Turret 29A (Black Carts) is located about 100 metres (110 yd) east of the minor road to Simonburn, and exists within a 460 metres (500 yd) long stretch of extant curtain wall of Narrow gauge at this point, with clearly visible foundation stones. (The term 'carts' within the name is derived from the old English word ceart, which means rocky and rough.) Although severely robbed on the south side, the masonry stands up to eleven courses high in the recess. The presence of the broad wing walls indicates that the fortification was constructed prior to Hadrian's Wall itself. The upright portions of the door frame are made from solitary stones. At the highest point of the structure, there are fourteen cut stones per horizontal row.

The internal measurements of the turret are 3.45 metres (11.3 ft) by 3.40 metres (11.2 ft) and it is of a type thought to have been built by the Legio XX Valeria Victrix. The entrance is 0.9 metres (3.0 ft) wide, and located in the east side of the south wall.

On the south side, the vallum is still visible.

The turret was excavated in 1873, 1912 and finally in 1971, prior to being consolidated by the Department of the Environment. During these excavations, fragments of millstones were found, along with coins of Vespasian, Trajan, Hadrian and Constantine (in quantities higher than are usually recovered).

Location on Ordnance Survey 1:25 000 map: 55.036009°N 2.182452°W

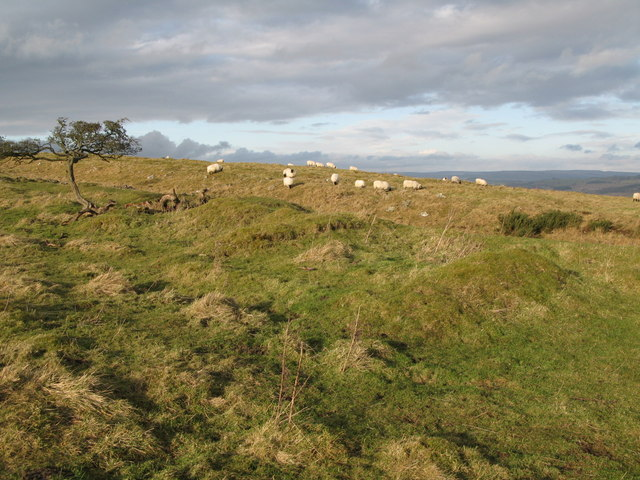
The site of Turret 29B

=== Turret 29B ===
Turret 29B (Limestone Bank) remains as a low earthwork, turf covered with little (if any) visible masonry. The track connecting the turret to the Military Way can also be discerned.

Excavations in 1912 revealed the turret to have wing walls, and a very similar layout to Turet 29A. Roofing slabs (many pierced by nails) were found among debris inside the turret, along with three large flagstones, possibly from an upper floor. Below these were two occupation levels. The later floor was of flags, and the original, clay. On the south-west corner, on the later floor, a masonry platform had been constructed. Beside the east wall, an amphora had been set into the clay and cobbles, while a hearth lay against the west wall. The following artefacts were also discovered:

- Shield boss
- Spear head
- Brooches
- Melon Bead
- Gaming board
- Millstone fragments
- 2 Flints
- Pottery revealing that occupation did not extend beyond the second century AD

Location on Ordnance Survey 1:25 000 map: 55.037481°N 2.189484°W

== Monument records ==
Monument	Monument Number	English Heritage Archive Number
Milecastle 29	16683	NY 87 SE 3
Turret 29A	16686	NY 87 SE 4
Turret 29B	16689	NY 87 SE 5

== Public access ==
The Milecastle and both turrets are accessible from the Hadrian's Wall National Trail.

== Bibliography ==
- Daniels, Charles (1979). "Review: Fact and Theory on Hadrian's Wall". Britannia. 10: 357–364. doi:10.2307/526069. JSTOR 526069.
