= Milecastle 28 =

Milecastle on Hadrian's Wall in England

- Northumberland, England, UK
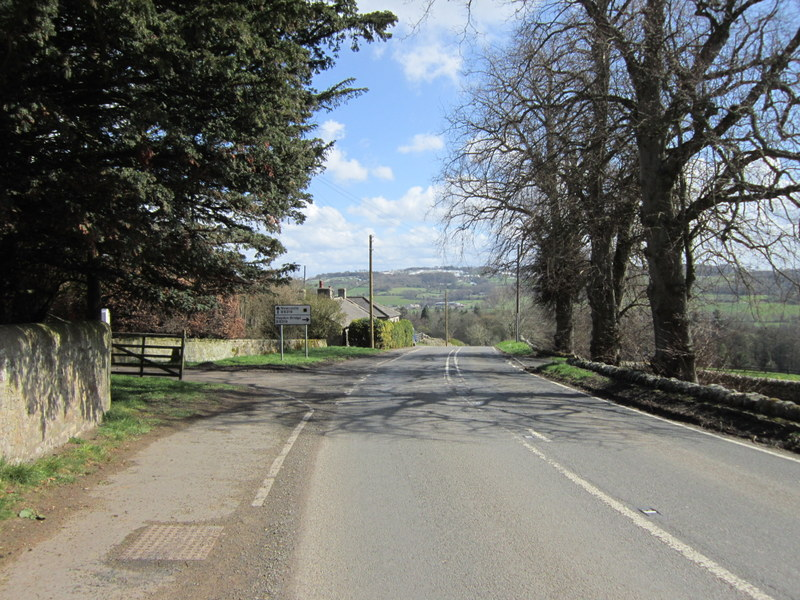
- B6318 Military Road at the site of Milecastle 28

Location
- Location in Northumberland
- Coordinates: 55.029086°N 2.152839°W
- Grid reference: NY90317054

Milecastle 28 (Walwick) was a milecastle of the Roman Hadrian's Wall in England. No remains are currently visible. Its location is immediately to the south of the B6318 Military Road in Walwick.

== Construction ==
Milecastle 28 was probably a long-axis milecastle, though the gateway type cannot be identified. Such milecastles were thought to have been constructed by the legio VI Victrix who were based in Eboracum (York), or by the legio XX Valeria Victrix who were based in Deva Victrix (Chester).

== Excavations and investigations ==
- 1957 – The Handbook to the Roman Wall 11th edition is published, noting the presence of a platform located just before reaching Walwick Hall from Chesters, where the road swings to the left, off the line of the Wall, just west of the farm track leaving the road to the south. The platform suggests a long-axis milecastle.
- 1967 – English Heritage Field Investigation. It was noted that the milecastle could not be positively identified, but a slight scarp at NY 9035 7050may have represented its South side. It was surveyed at 1:2500.
- 1989 – English Heritage Field Investigation. It was noted that there was no evidence for the milecastle at the Ordnance Survey siting symbol; the scarp at NY 9035 7049 seen by the English Heritage Field Investigator in 1969 looked early modern and also too far south of the Wall. It was concluded that the milecastle could not be located precisely, but from measurements must have been situated in the general area of NY 903 705.

== Associated turrets ==
Each milecastle on Hadrian's Wall had two associated turret structures. These turrets were positioned approximately one-third and two-thirds of a Roman mile to the west of the Milecastle, and would probably have been manned by part of the milecastle's garrison. The turrets associated with Milecastle 28 are known as Turret 28A and Turret 28B.

=== Turret 28A ===
There are currently no visible remains of Turret 28A. It was first described in 1727 by Alexander Gordon in Iter Septentrionale, stating that it was

a little exploratory turret of hewn free-stone, a little more than 12 ft. in length, something less in breadth, and about five courses of stone in height.

It was relocated in 1920 about 300 yards (270 m) west of Walwick Hall.

Location on Ordnance Survey 1:25 000 map: 55.031035°N 2.160512°W

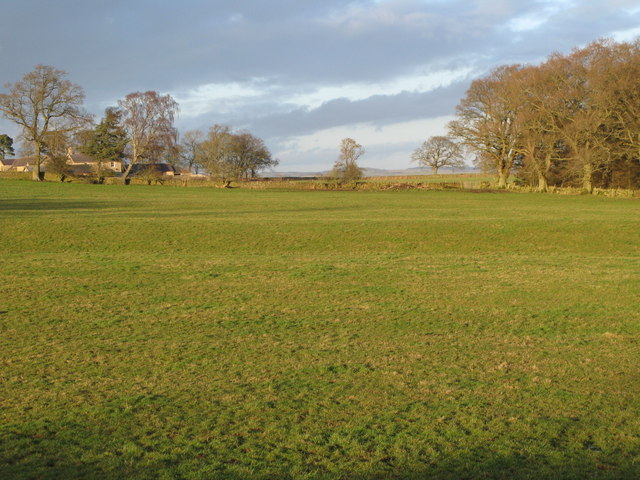
The site of Turret 28B

=== Turret 28B ===
Turret 28B is located the normal distance between Turret 28A and Milecastle 29. The site (identified by English heritage Field Investigation in 1965) is marked by slight traces of protruding stonework. The stones were barely discernible, but appeared to outline a structure measuring approximately 4.0 metres (13.1 ft) North-South, and 5.0 metres (16.4 ft) East-West.

Location on Ordnance Survey 1:25 000 map: 55.032660°N 2.167699°W

== Monument records ==
Monument	Monument Number	English Heritage Archive Number
Milecastle 28	19104	NY 97 SW 3
Turret 28A	16677	NY 87 SE 1
Turret 28B	16680	NY 87 SE 2

== Public access ==
The sites of Milecastle 28 and Turret 28A are not publicly accessible. The site of Turret 28B lies just off the Hadrian's Wall National Trail.

== Bibliography ==
- Daniels, Charles (1979), "Review: Fact and Theory on Hadrian's Wall", Britannia, 10: 357–364, doi:10.2307/526069, JSTOR 526069
