= No Place (disambiguation) =

No Place is a village in England.

No Place may also refer to:

- No Place (album), an album by A Lot Like Birds
- No Place (film), a 2005 film
- "No Place" (song), a 2018 song by Rüfüs Du Sol
- No Place, a song by Backstreet Boys, from the album DNA
- Non-place, an anthropological concept
- "No Places", a 2020 episode of television series Breeders
