= Milecastle 24 =

Milecastle on Hadrian's Wall in Northumberland, England

- Northumberland, England, UK
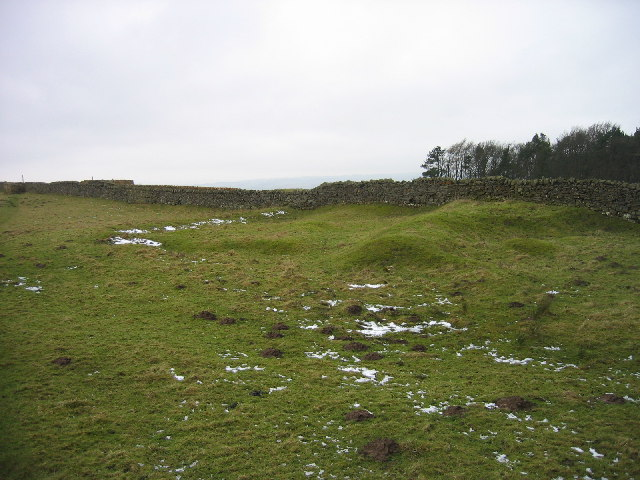
- The low platform marking the remains of Milecastle 24

Location
- Location in Northumberland
- Coordinates: 55.017825°N 2.063043°W
- Grid reference: NY96066925

Milecastle 24 (Wall Fell) was a milecastle of the Roman Hadrian's Wall. Its remains exist as a low platform, and are located to the south of the B6318 Military Road around 3 kilometres (1.9 mi) west of its junction with the A68.

== Construction ==
Because of the similarity in its construction to that of Milecastle 23, Milecastle 24 is assumed to be a long-axis milecastle. The gateway type is unknown, though long-axis milecastles were thought to have been constructed by the Legio VI Victrix who were based in Eboracum (York).

The milecastle measured 15.24 metres (50.0 ft) across, and had broad east and west walls (the curtain wall at this point was also broad gauge).

A change in the vegetation in the ditch adjacent to the south gateway may suggest the prior existence of a causeway that was subsequently removed.

== Excavations and investigations ==
- 1879 – The milecastle was visited and depicted by James Irwin Coates.
- 1930 – The location and construction details of the milecastle were established.
- 1966 – English Heritage Field Investigation. The position of the milecastle was confirmed. It was noted that the perimeter wall of the milecastle was extant as a 0.5 metres (1.6 ft) high turf covered bank, obscured by quarry spoil on the north east.
- 1989 – English Heritage Field Investigation. Remains of robber/excavation trenches (up to 0.3 metres (0.98 ft) deep), and a large spoil heap (up to 1.2 metres (3.9 ft) high), were noted, but no real platform could be identified. The milecastle position and probable axis type were also confirmed.

== Associated turrets ==
Each milecastle on Hadrian's Wall had two associated turret structures. These turrets were positioned approximately one-third and two-thirds of a Roman mile to the west of the Milecastle, and would probably have been manned by part of the milecastle's garrison. The turrets associated with Milecastle 24 are known as Turret 24A and Turret 24B.

=== Turret 24A ===
Turret 24A (Green Field) is now located beneath the B6318 Military Road, though it was excavated in February 1930. Remains of its masonry were three courses high on the north west corner, gradually reducing to one at the other corner.

Location on Ordnance Survey 1:25 000 map: 55.018791°N 2.071083°W

=== Turret 24B ===
Turret 24B (Tithe Barn) is now located beneath the B6318 Military Road, though it was excavated in February 1930. Remains of its masonry, like those of Turret 23A, were three courses high on the north west corner, gradually reducing to one at the other corner.

Location on Ordnance Survey 1:25 000 map: 55.019083°N 2.078152°W

== Monument records ==
Monument	Monument Number	English Heritage Archive Number
Milecastle 24	18186	NY 96 NE 11
Turret 24A	18189	NY 96 NE 12
Turret 24B	18189	NY 96 NE 12

== Public access ==
Access to the mound marking the Milecastle is via the Hadrian's Wall Path National Trail.

== Bibliography ==
- Daniels, Charles (1979), "Review: Fact and Theory on Hadrian's Wall", Britannia, 10: 357–364, JSTOR 526069
