= No Place =

Village in County Durham, England

Coordinates: 54.87357°N 1.662283°W

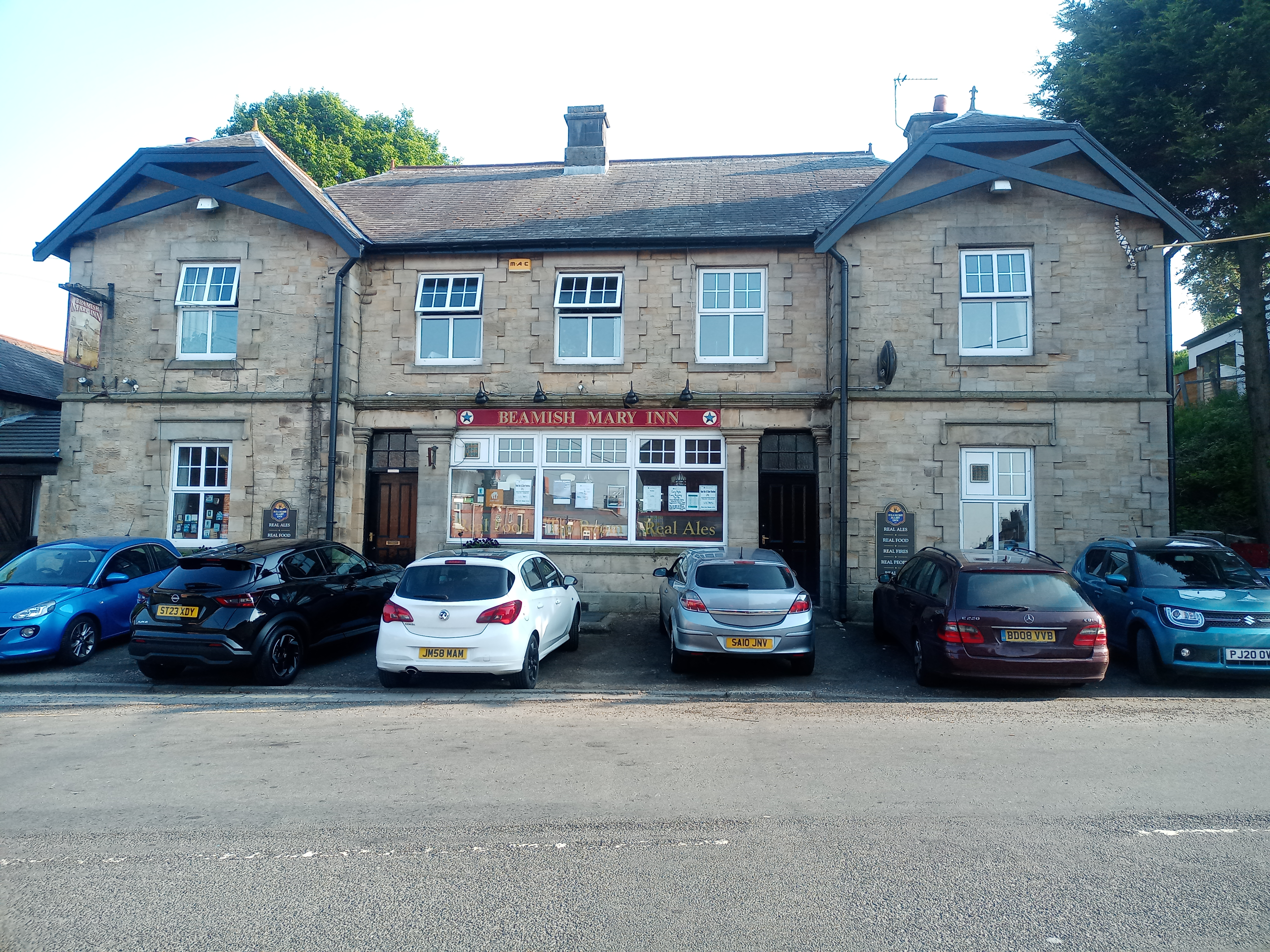
- The Beamish Mary Inn

- Location within County Durham
- OS grid reference: NZ210530
- Civil parish: Stanley
- Unitary authority: County Durham
- Ceremonial county: County Durham
- Region: North East
- Country: England
- Sovereign state: United Kingdom
- Post town: STANLEY
- Postcode district: DH9
- Dialling code: 0191
- Police: Durham
- Fire: County Durham and Darlington
- Ambulance: North East
- UK Parliament: North Durham

No Place is a small village that lies between the towns of Stanley and Beamish, in County Durham, England. It lies near to the Beamish Mary coal pit, just to the south of the A693 road. The local church is known as the "Tin Chapel".

== Etymology ==
The origins of the village's unusual name are uncertain; however, theories include a shortening of "North Place", "Near Place" or "Nigh Place", or that the original houses of the village stood on a boundary between two parishes, neither of which would accept the village. It could also be a literary play on the word "Utopia", which comes from the Greek, οὐ ("not") and τόπος ("place") and translates as "no-place".

== History ==
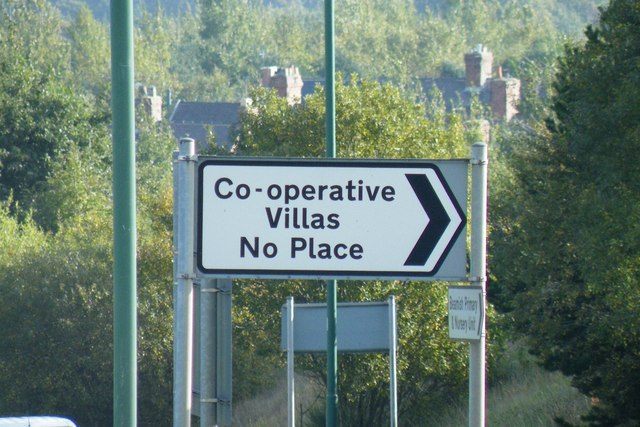
Road sign for Co-operative Villas and No Place

The village originally consisted of four terraced houses, known as No Place. In 1937, residents of the terrace of houses to the north, known as Co-operative Villas, demolished these houses, but took on the name for their own village.

Derwentside Council tried to change the name of the village to Co-operative Villas in 1983; however, they met with strong protests from local residents at the removal of all signs pointing to No Place. At the request of some residents, the signs say both No Place and Co-operative Villas.

No Place has been noted for its unusual place name. Other unusual place names in the North East include the village of Pity Me, (Note: Probably a contraction of Pithead Mere, a nearby bog.) Bearpark, (Note: From Beaurepaire, French for "beautiful retreat" – the name of a nearby Norman manor.) Wideopen, Once Brewed and Twice Brewed.

== Amenities ==
The village is home to an award-winning real ale pub, the Beamish Mary Inn; it dates from 1897 and was known originally as the Red Robin.

== In popular culture ==
Sharing the village's name is No Place, an independently-produced feature film made in the North East of England and shown at the Cannes Film Festival. It led subsequently to limited distribution at the Tyneside Cinema.
