= Milecastle 16 =

Milecastle on Hadrian's Wall

- Northumberland, England, UK
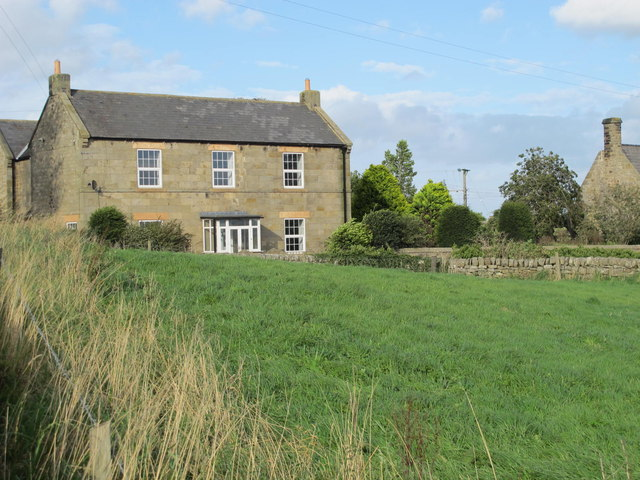
- The site of Milecastle 16

Location
- Location in Northumberland
- Coordinates: 55.009200°N 1.879730°W
- Grid reference: NZ07796830

Milecastle 16 (Harlow Hill) was a milecastle of the Roman Hadrian's Wall. The milecastle is located at Harlow Hill, Northumberland, England. There are no visible surface remains of the milecastle or either of its associated turrets.

== Construction ==
No details are known about the type of construction of this milecastle. Milecastle 16 is visible on the ground as a slight platform in a field adjacent to the south of the B6318 Military Road. The platform measures 23 m from north to south and there are no other surface remains. The site lies on the crest of Harlow Hill and when established would have had a clear line of sight in all directions. The stretch of Hadrian's Wall in this area was removed during the construction of the Military Road.

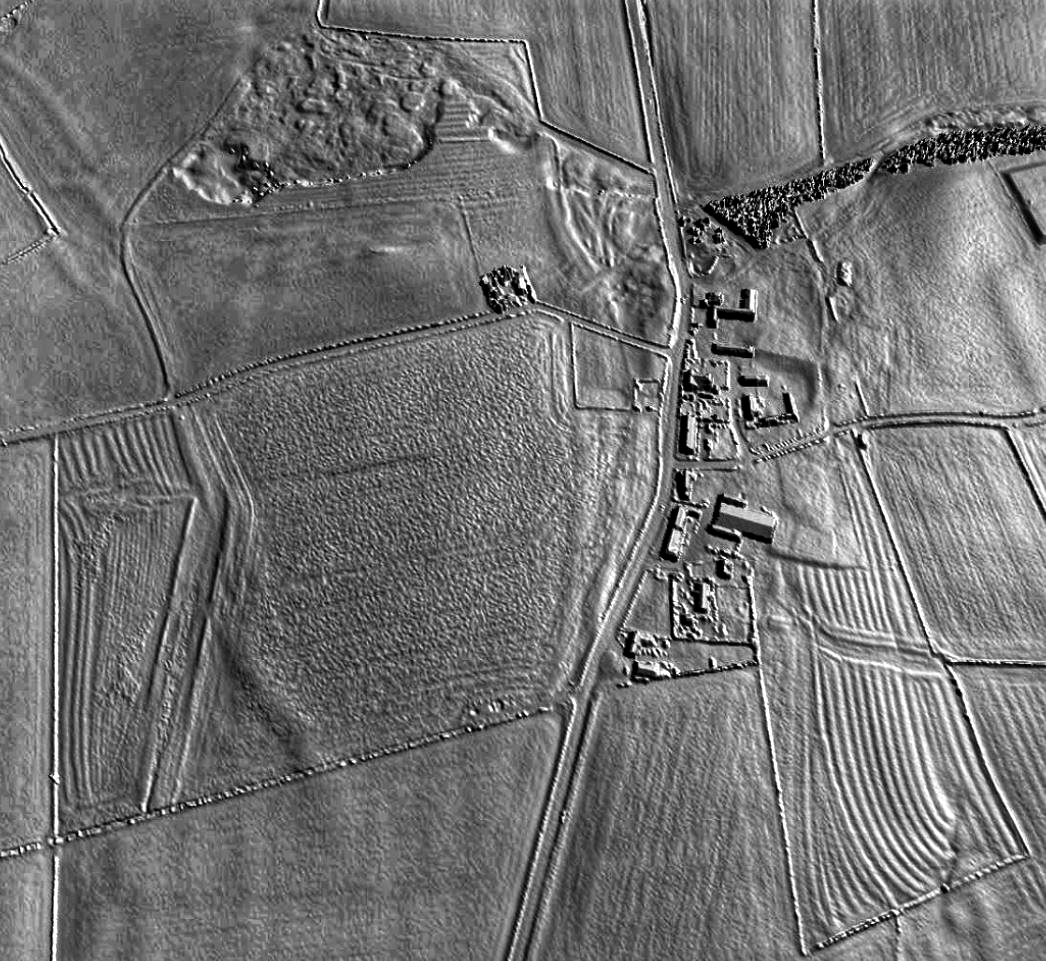
A lidar view of the site of Milecastle 16 at Harlow Hill shrunken Medieval village on Hadrian's Wall

== Excavations and investigations ==
- 1732 – John Horsley viewed the remains of the foundations of the milecastle.
- 1920s – Excavations failed to discover the milecastle.
- 1930 – The milecastle's estimated position was recalculated.
- 1950s – The milecastle was excavated by Hepple and Richmond.

== Associated turrets ==
Each milecastle on Hadrian's Wall had two associated turret structures. These turrets were positioned approximately one-third and two-thirds of a Roman mile to the west of the Milecastle, and would probably have been manned by part of the milecastle's garrison. The turrets associated with Milecastle 16 are known as Turret 16A and Turret 16B.

=== Turret 16A ===
Turret 16A is said to have been located by Thomas Hepple in 1930 but he made no mention of it in his fieldwork notebook. The presumed site of the turret lies beneath the 18th century B6318 Military Road and by 1966 there were no surface visible remains.

Location: 55.009118°N 1.887548°W

=== Turret 16B ===
Turret 16B was also said to have been located by Hepple in 1930 but if he did find the turret he did not document it in his notebook. The presumed site lies beneath the Military Road adjacent to the Great Northern Reservoir (of the Whittle Dene reservoir complex). Like Turret 16A no surface remains could be seen by 1966.

Location: 55.008855°N 1.895210°W

== Monument records ==
Monument	Monument Number	English Heritage Archive Number
Milecastle 16	20387	NZ 06 NE 5
Turret 16A	20390	NZ 06 NE 6
Turret 16B	20393	NZ 06 NE 7
