= Milecastle 32 =

Milecastle on Hadrian's Wall in Northumberland, England

- Northumberland, England, UK
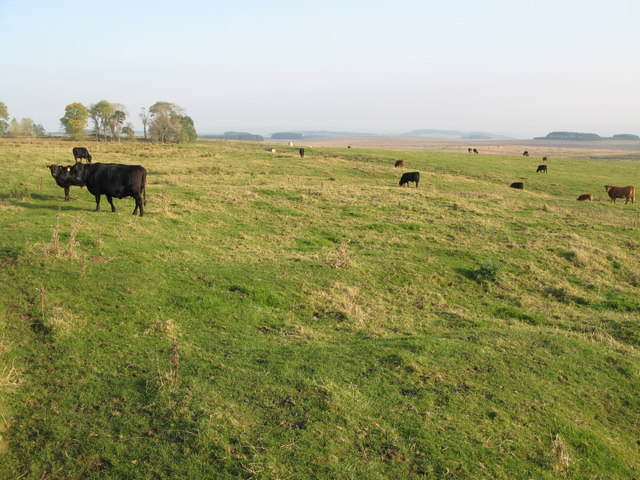
- The site of Milecastle 32

Location
- Location in Northumberland
- Coordinates: 55.033207°N 2.243002°W
- Grid reference: NY84567099

Milecastle 32 (Carraw) was a milecastle of the Roman Hadrian's Wall. Its remains exist as earthworks and with no exposed masonry. The layout of the milecastle walls is defined (still quite evident) by robber trenches (to a maximum depth of 0.3 metres (1 ft 0 in). The north wall is beneath a modern wall.

== Place-name etymology ==
Carraw seems to be a Cumbric name cognate with Welsh carrau 'rocks'.

== Construction ==
Milecastle 32 was a long-axis milecastle though the gateway type cannot be identified. Such milecastles were thought to have been constructed by the legio VI Victrix who were based in Eboracum (York), or by the legio XX Valeria Victrix who were based in Deva Victrix (Chester).

Its dimensions (measured between the edges of the visible platform) are 20 metres (66 ft) (long axis) by 16.5 metres (54 ft). The long axis measures 19.5 metres (64 ft) between the apparent centre lines of the (still evident) robber trenches giving internal proportions of 10:8, which is normal.

Changes in the dimensions of the wall ditch at this point suggest the possible presence of a causeway.

== Excavations and investigations ==
- 1961 – The position of the milecastle is formally recorded by Eric Birley.
- 1966 – English Heritage Field Investigation. It was noted that the remains consisted of a low mutilated platform surrounded by a robber trench, and that no masonry was visible.
- 1971 – The milecastle is measured, and the south gateway excavated. Stone robbing proved too extensive for identification. Fourth-century pottery is discovered.
- 1989 – English Heritage Field Investigation (as part of Hadrian's Wall Project). Previous observations are reconfirmed.

== Associated turrets ==
Each milecastle on Hadrian's Wall had two associated turret structures. These turrets were positioned approximately one-third and two-thirds of a Roman mile to the west of the Milecastle, and would probably have been manned by part of the milecastle's garrison. The turrets associated with Milecastle 32 are known as Turret 32A and Turret 32B.

=== Turret 32A ===
Turret 32A (Carraw West) was located in 1920, though the remains are mostly buried beneath the B6318 Military Road.

Location on Ordnance Survey 1:25 000 map: 55.032411°N 2.250272°W. (Ordnance Survey National Grid Coordinates: NY 8409 7091)

=== Turret 32B ===
The accepted site of Turret 32B (Brown Moor) was ascertained by measurement only. Any remains would lie beneath the B6318 Military Road.

Approximate predicted location: 55.031898°N 2.258889°W. (Ordnance Survey National Grid Coordinates: NY 835 708)

== Monument records ==
| Monument | Monument Number | English Heritage Archive Number |
|---|---|---|
| Milecastle 32 | 16800 | NY 87 SW 1 |
| Turret 32A | 16803 | NY 87 SW 2 |
| Turret 32B | 16806 | NY 87 SW 3 |

== Public access ==
The milecastle is on private land abutting the B6318 Military Road, and both turrets are buried beneath the B6318 Military Road.

== Bibliography ==
- Daniels, Charles (1979), "Review: Fact and Theory on Hadrian's Wall", Britannia, 10: 357–364, doi:10.2307/526069, JSTOR 526069
