= Milecastle 39 =

Small Roman fort, part of Hadrian's Wall

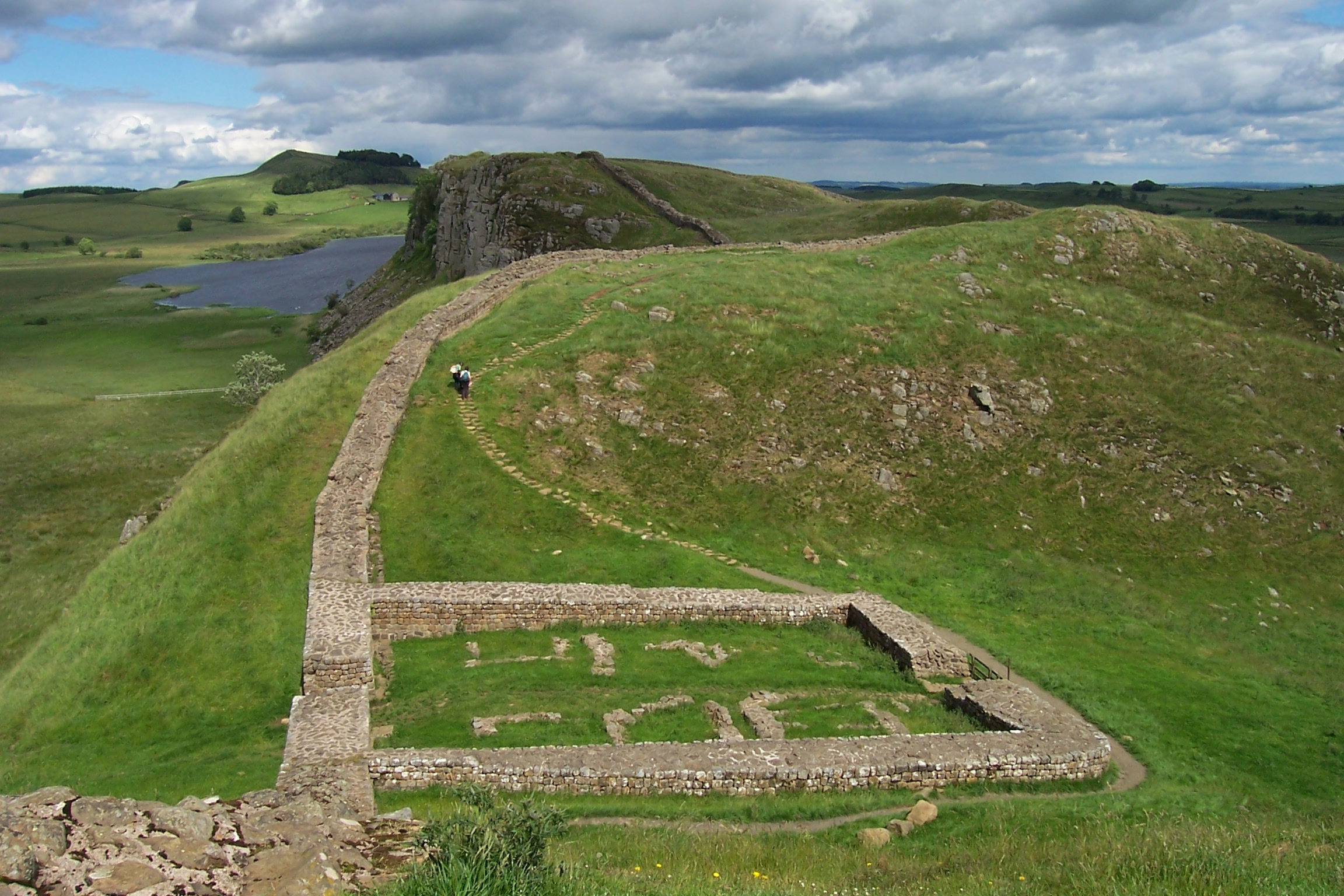
- The remains of Milecastle 39, near Steel Rigg

- Location within Northumberland
- 55.003602°N 2.375725°W
- Type: Milecastle
- Location: Northumberland, England

Milecastle 39 (Castle Nick) is a milecastle on Hadrian's Wall (grid reference NY76066773).

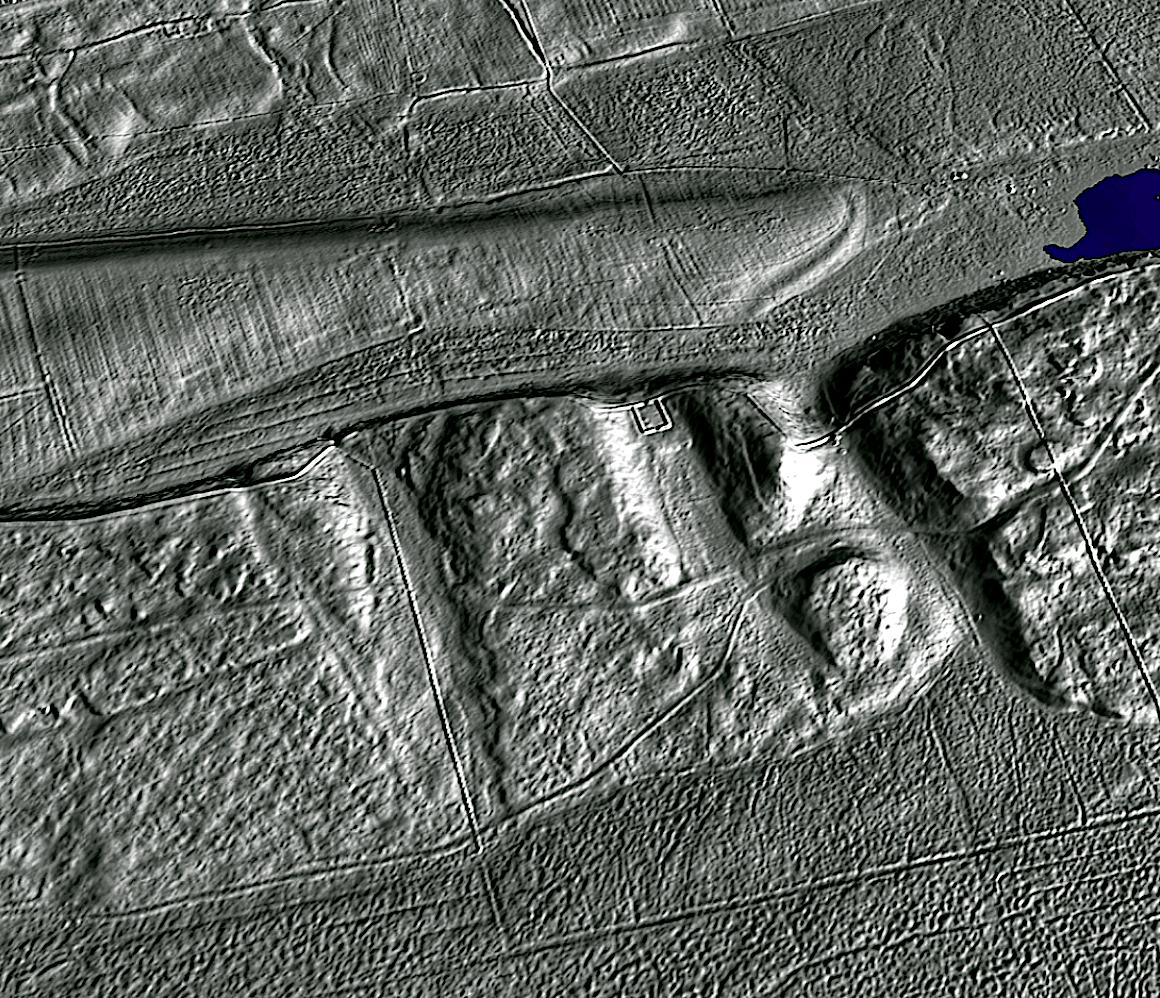
A lidar view of Milecastle 39.

== Description ==
Milecastle 39 is located northeast of Once Brewed. The excavated stonework has been consolidated, and the walls are up to 1.75 metres high. It measures 19 metres by 15.5 metres.

== Excavations ==
The site was cleared in 1854, and was excavated in 1908–11. It was re-excavated between 1982 and 1987. It was found to have a long axis, with a Type II gateway. In the south-east corner was a stone oven and the south-west corner a rectangular building with a sunken floor associated with Roman finds. The milecastle appears to have been occupied until the late 4th century. In the 18th century a possible milking house was built in the west corner.

== Associated turrets ==
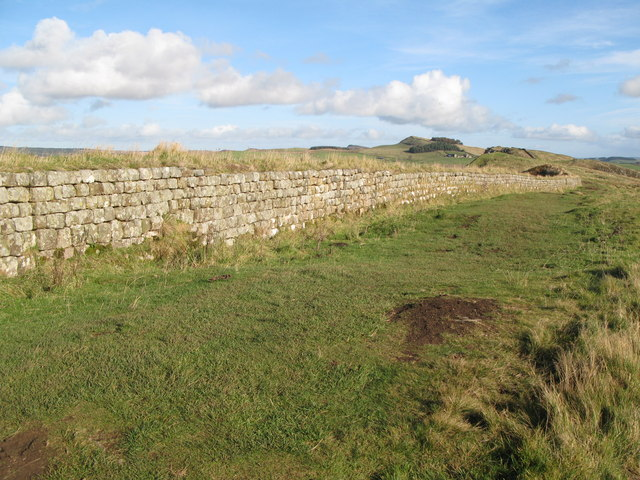
The site of Turret 39A

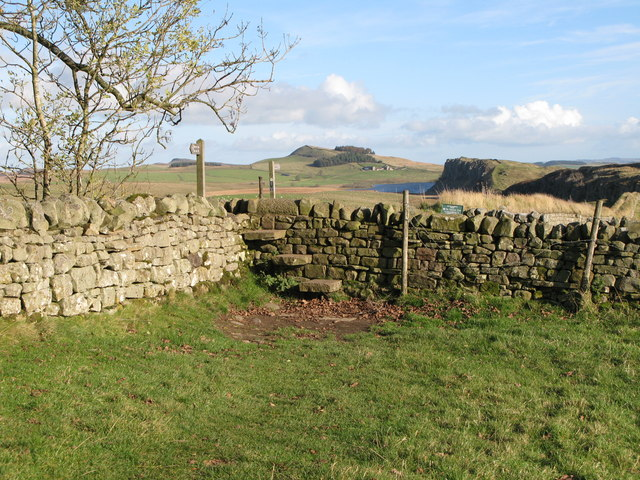
The site of Turret 39B

Each milecastle on Hadrian's Wall had two associated turret structures. These turrets were positioned approximately one-third and two-thirds of a Roman mile to the west of the Milecastle, and would probably have been manned by part of the milecastle's garrison. The turrets associated with Milecastle 39 are known as Turret 39A and Turret 39B.

=== Turret 39A ===
Turret 39A (Peel Crag) (grid reference NY75626763) was located in 1909 and excavated in 1911. It was found to have been abandoned, dismantled and its recess built up at the end of the 2nd century. In the north-west corner was a burial of a man and a woman. The turret is visible as a slight rectangular hollow about 20 centimetres deep.

=== Turret 39B ===
Turret 39B (Steelrigg) (grid reference NY75056758) was excavated in 1909 and in 1911. It was found to have been abandoned, dismantled and its recess built up at the end of the 2nd century. There are no visible remains.

== Peel Gap Tower ==
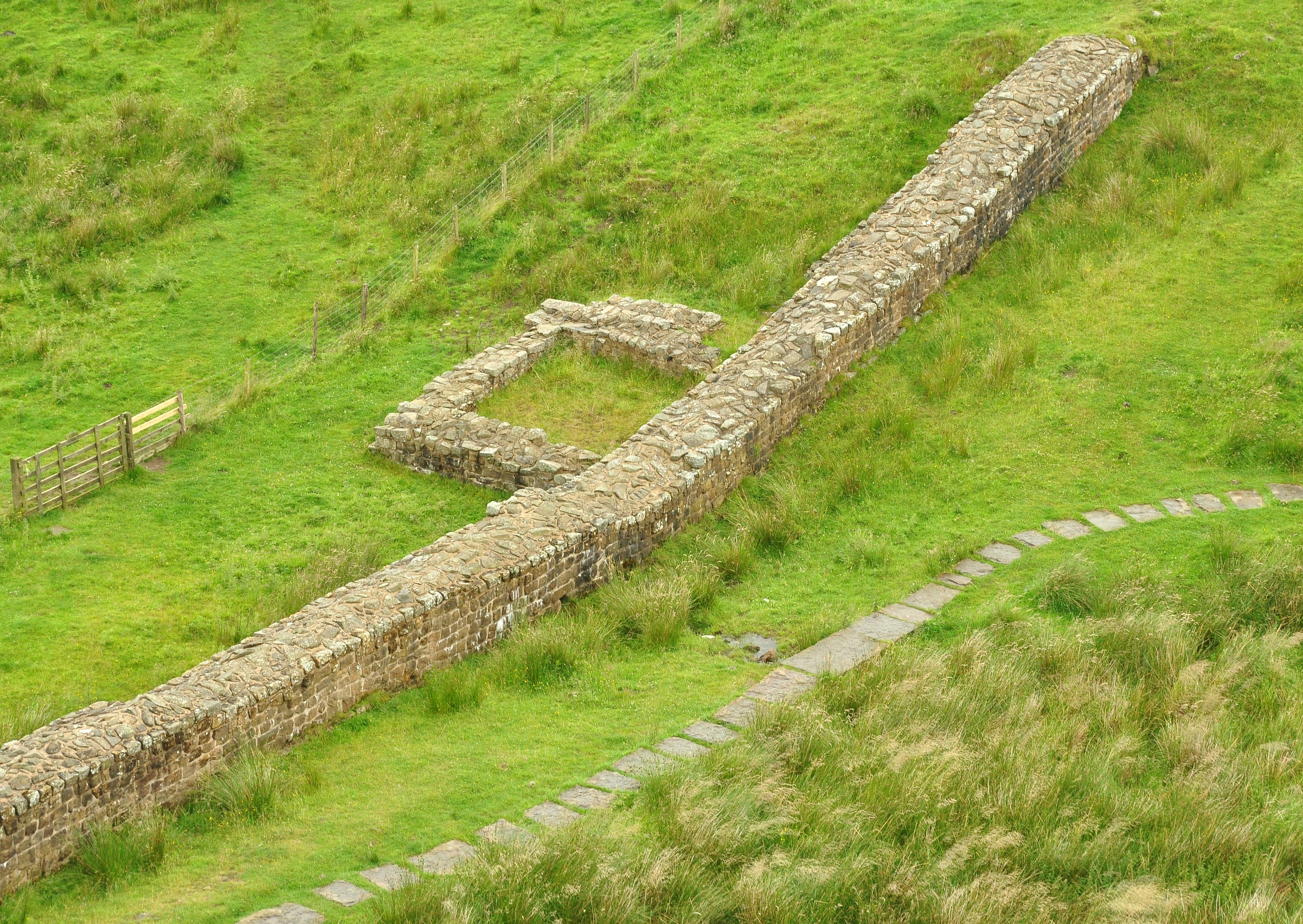
Peel Gap Tower

In summer 1987 excavations along Hadrian's Wall (made jointly by the National Trust and English Heritage) discovered the foundations of a Roman tower between turrets 39A and 39B. The tower is located 345 metres (377 yd) west of Turret 39A (grid reference NY75336748) in the lowest part of Peel Gap. It appears to have been constructed shortly after the wall had been completed, as evidenced by the lower build quality, and that it was built abutting the wall (rather than recessed into it like other turrets). The foundations are rectangular, measuring 4 metres (13 ft) (east/west) by 3.59 metres (11.8 ft) (north/south), with walls 0.91 metres (3.0 ft) thick. The doorway (located at the east end of the south wall) was found to have been blocked up. The foundations of a platform were found along the outside of the west wall.

It appears to have filled the gap between Turrets 39A and 39B which is the longest known gap between two turrets along the entire length of the wall.

== Access ==
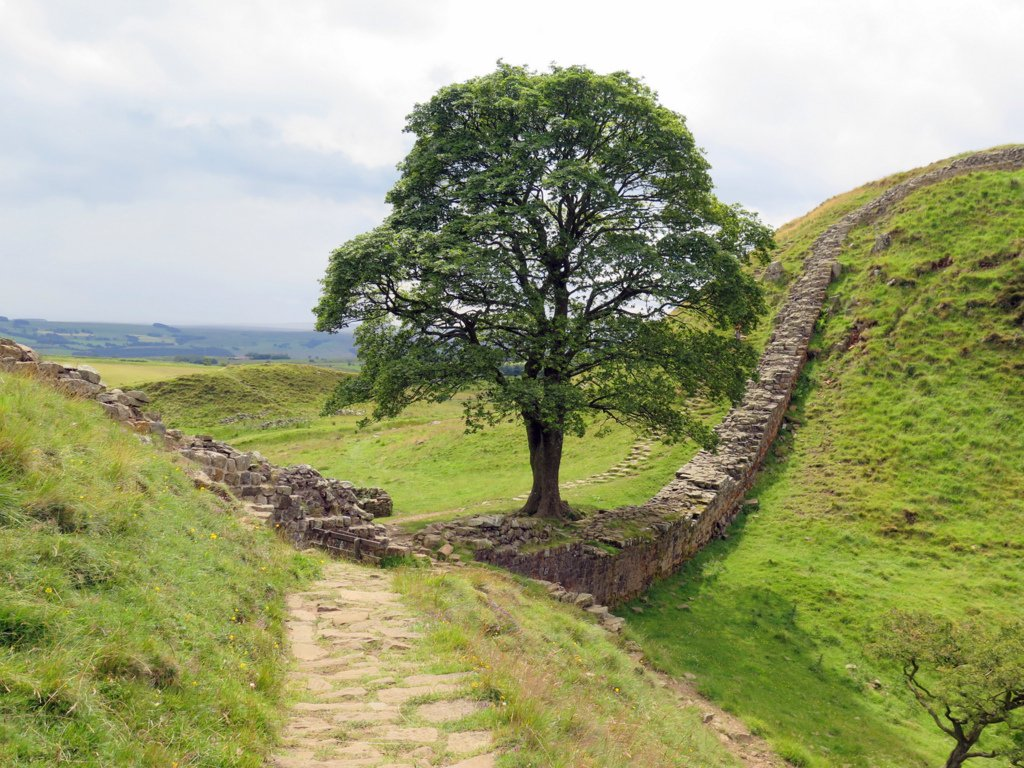
The Sycamore Gap Tree in 2015

The milecastle, the sites of both turrets, and the remains of Peel Gap Tower are all accessible via the Hadrian's Wall Path. The Sycamore Gap Tree stood nearby until it was felled in 2023.
