= Sycamore Gap tree =

Sycamore tree in Northumberland, England

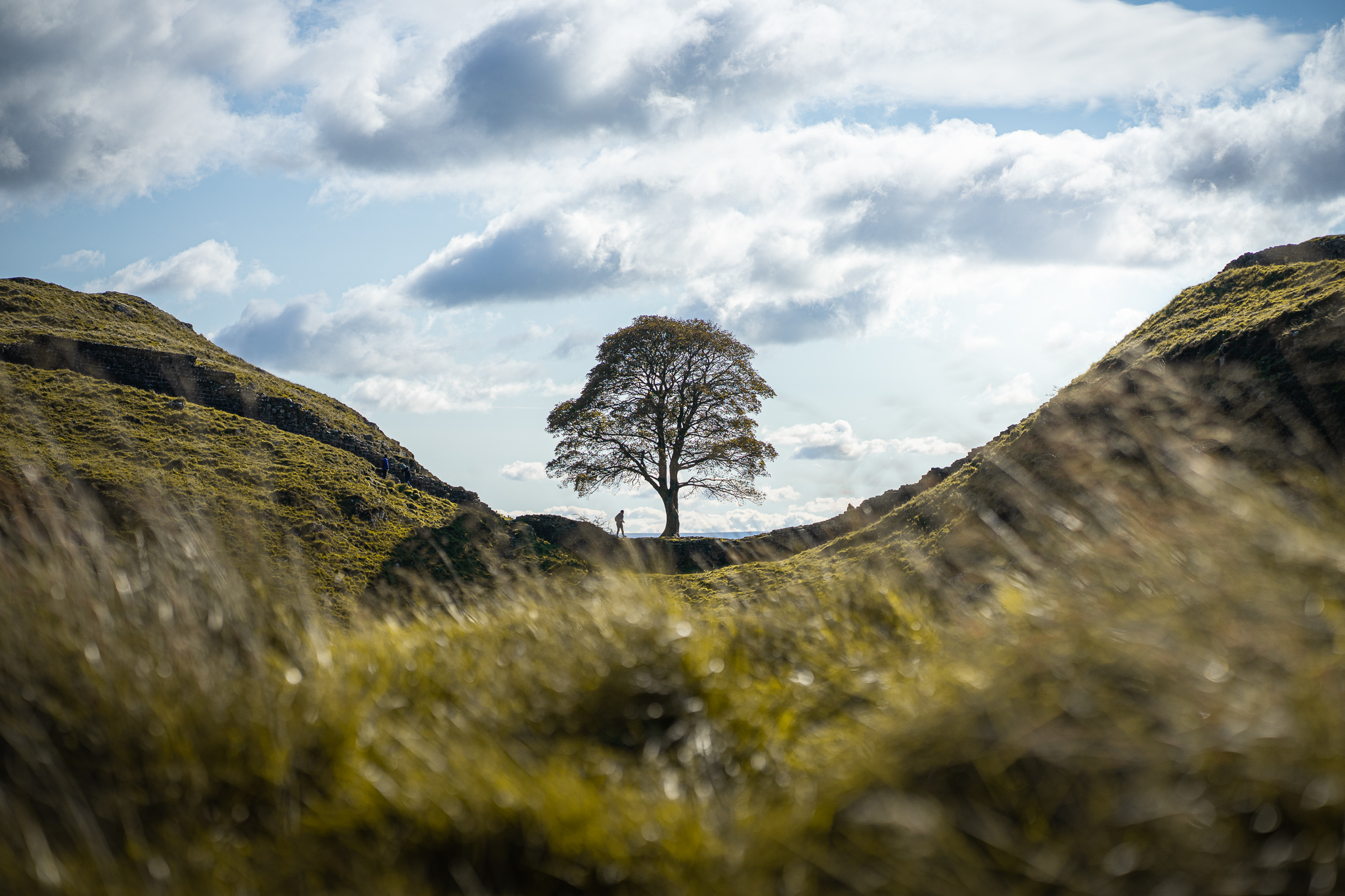
- View of the tree from the north in 2020 3 years before it was felled. Hadrian's Wall is visible to the left of and in front of the tree.
- Interactive map of Sycamore Gap tree
- Species: Sycamore (Acer pseudoplatanus)
- Location: Near Crag Lough, Northumberland, England
- Coordinates: 55.0036°N 2.3739°W; NY 761 677
- Height: approx. 49 feet (15 m) (formerly)
- Date seeded: late 1800s
- Date felled: 28 September 2023
- Custodian: National Trust and Northumberland National Park

The Sycamore Gap tree, also known as the Robin Hood tree, is a 150-year-old sycamore tree next to Hadrian's Wall near Crag Lough in Northumberland, England. It now exists only as a stump, having been illegally felled in 2023. Standing in a dip in the landscape created by glacial meltwater, it was one of the country's most photographed trees and an emblem for the North East of England. Its alternative name is derived from featuring in a scene in the 1991 film Robin Hood: Prince of Thieves. The tree won the Woodland Trust 2016 England Tree of the Year award, receiving a £1,000 care grant funded by the People's Postcode Lottery.

In July 2025, Daniel Graham and Adam Carruthers were convicted of causing criminal damage by felling the tree, and were each sentenced to 4 years and 3 months in prison. Carruthers was released in April 2026 and Graham that October. The stump has thrown up basal shoots, and seeds and cuttings have been gathered for propagation. Now standing as a coppiced specimen, the tree is expected to take more than 150 years to regrow back to its former size.

== Location ==
The Sycamore Gap tree grew to a height of approximately 15 m (49 ft), next to Hadrian's Wall, between Milecastle 39 and Crag Lough, about 2 miles (3 km) west of Housesteads Roman Fort in Northumberland, northern England. This section of the wall follows the edge of a cliff – an outcrop of the Whin Sill – and several sharp dips in it caused by melting glacial waters. The tree stood within one of these dips with the cliff and wall rising dramatically either side. The wall and adjacent land, including the site of the tree, are owned by the National Trust. The area was subject to an archaeological excavation in the mid-1980s during which a pottery dump dating to around 175 AD was found.

A popular setting for marriage proposals, weddings, and the spreading of ashes of loved ones, the tree was described as one of the most photographed in the country and the location may be the most photographed point in all of Northumberland National Park. It was visible from the nearby B6318 Military Road. The name "Sycamore Gap" was coined by National Trust employee Lawrence Hewer when the Ordnance Survey were remapping the area and asked if the previously unnamed spot had a designation.

== History ==
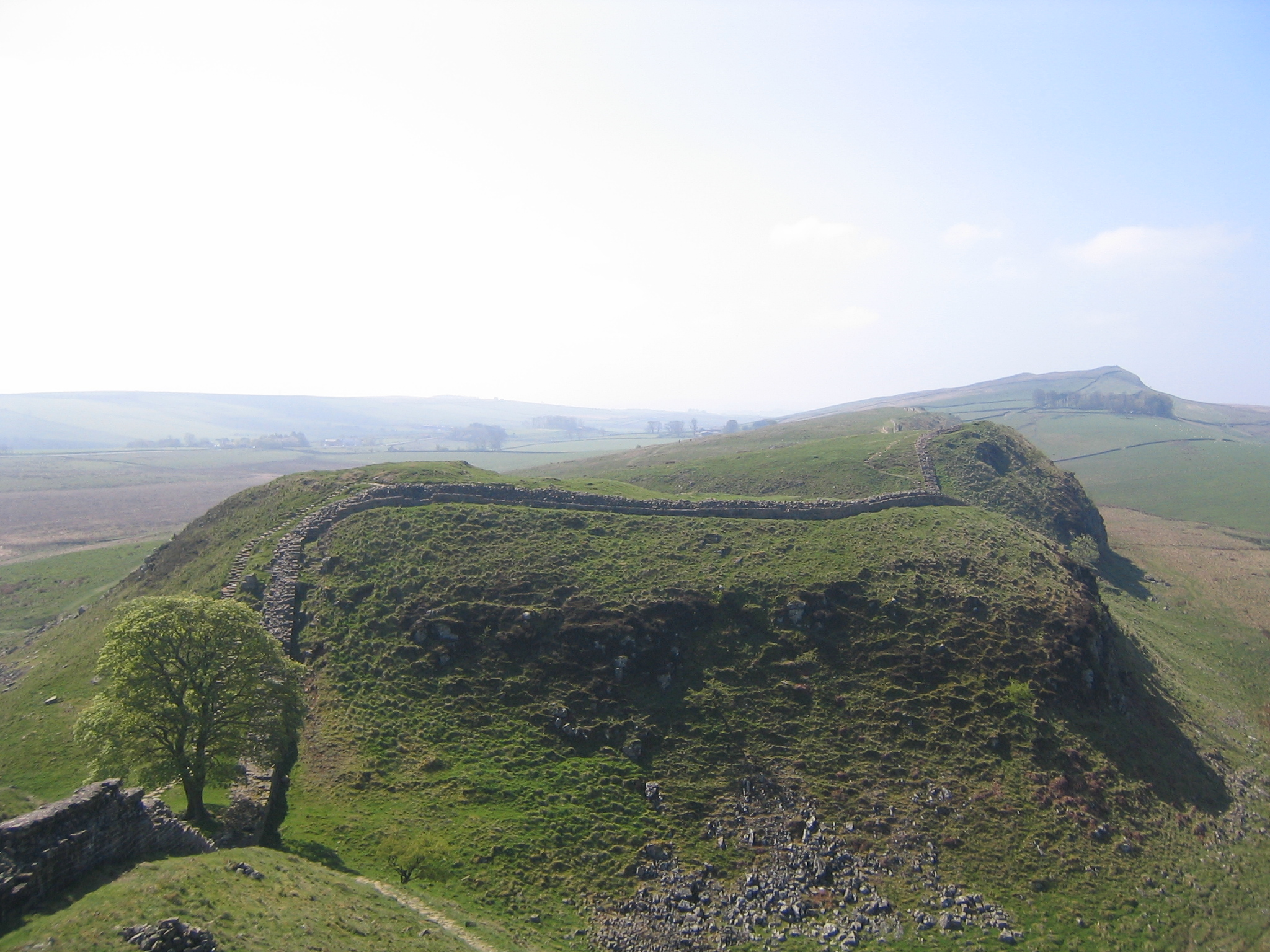
Sycamore Gap, looking west in 2007

The tree is a non-native sycamore (Acer pseudoplatanus). According to the National Trust, it was planted in the late 19th century by the previous land owner, Newcastle lawyer John Clayton (1792–1890) as a landscape feature, making it about 150 years old. It is possible that the tree is somewhat older. John Hodgson sketched a tree in the gap on 18 October 1832 and an enclosure around the tree appears on Ordnance Survey maps by the 1860s. Clayton was part of a wealthy family and he inherited the Roman fort of Chesters. He was a keen excavator of Hadrian's Wall; for almost 50 years, he excavated every year, enhancing the understanding of the construction of Hadrian's Wall, and became worried that it was being destroyed by people taking the dressed stone to build farmhouses and other buildings. By the time he died he owned five forts and around 20 miles (32 kilometres) of Hadrian's Wall. By purchasing these sites he brought them under his protection.

The tree featured in a key scene near the beginning of the 1991 Kevin Costner film Robin Hood: Prince of Thieves and has subsequently become known as the "Robin Hood tree", although in reality it was some 170 miles (274 kilometres) from Sherwood Forest. It appeared in the music video for Bryan Adams' "(Everything I Do) I Do It for You", a song from the film's soundtrack; the video was regularly shown on the British TV programme Top of the Pops in 1991. The tree also appeared in the TV crime drama Vera and in the documentary series More Tales from Northumberland with Robson Green. The site was popular among astrophotographers and stargazers. The tree escaped damage on 30 May 2003 when a helicopter filming British Isles – A Natural History crashed around 30 metres (100 feet) away, narrowly avoiding presenter Alan Titchmarsh. The four on board the aircraft were lightly injured.

In 2016, the tree was nominated for England's Tree of the Year competition. It was selected from 200 competitors for the final shortlist of ten and won the competition with 2,542 votes out of 11,913. The prize was a £1,000 grant, funded by the People's Postcode Lottery, which was used to survey the health of the tree and to carry out work to protect its roots, which were becoming exposed due to the high volume of foot traffic passing over them. The Sycamore Gap Tree was entered in the 2017 European Tree of the Year contest in which it came fifth out of 16, polling 7,123 votes.

== Felling and aftermath ==
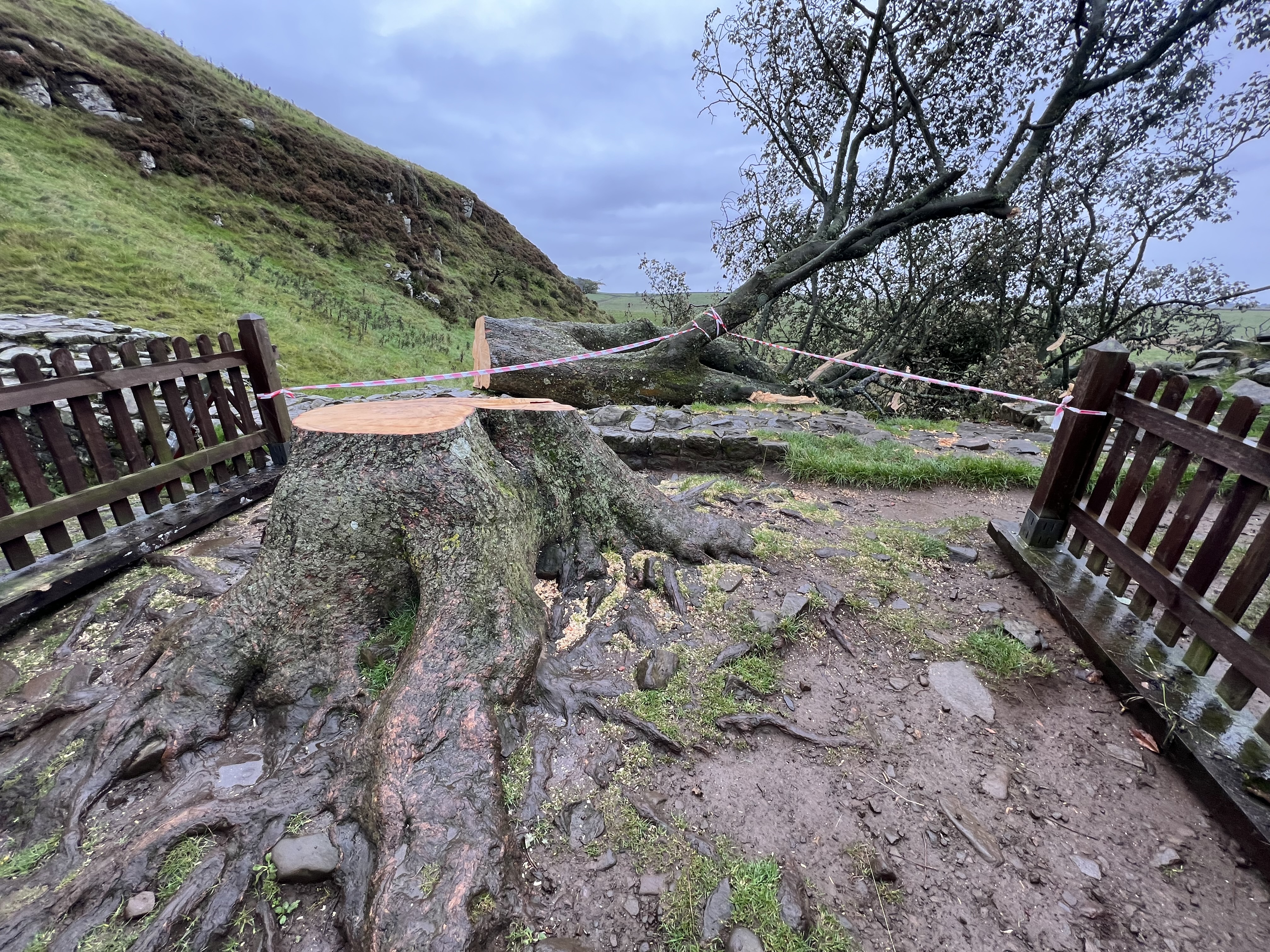
The tree two days after it was felled

The tree was felled with a chainsaw in the early morning of 28 September 2023; the noise of the saw was apparently masked by the high winds of a storm. There was also damage to the nearby section of Hadrian's Wall. On 29 September 2023, a National Trust manager said that the stump seemed "healthy" and thought that the tree could possibly regrow in coppiced form, although he added that it would "take a few years to develop into even a small tree and around 150 to 200 years before it is anywhere close to what we have lost". Seeds were collected from the tree which are to be used to propagate new saplings.

The felled tree was cut up and removed for storage by the National Trust two weeks after being cut down. On 12 October a crane was employed to remove the trunk, which weighed between three and four tonnes.

On 8 March 2024, BBC News reported that the first seedlings had sprouted from seeds and twigs recovered at the site. The first seedling was presented to King Charles III, who announced that it would be planted in Windsor Great Park once it had matured into a sapling. Further seeds from the site are being grown into saplings by the National Trust that will be distributed to the school nearest the site and to the UK's National Parks, as well as to a number of good causes. In August 2024, it was found that new shoots had appeared at the base of the stump. Fence and netting installed around the stump and new shoots protects them against damage from visitors. By September the new shoots were described as "flourishing".

In July 2025 Daniel Graham and Adam Carruthers were convicted of criminal damage and sentenced to 4 years and 3 months in prison for causing £622,191 worth of damage to the tree, to run concurrently with a six-month sentence for causing £1,144 worth of damage to Hadrian's Wall; they were told that they would be released no later than 40% of the way through their sentence. In passing sentence, the presiding judge said that the crime manifested "sheer bravado", with Graham and Carruthers revelling in the outrage they had caused. Carruthers was released early in April 2026 under the Home Detention Curfew scheme and Graham was released under license in October 2026.

An exhibition was commissioned, using part of the tree's trunk, which opened in September 2024, a year after its felling, at the Sill National Landscape Discovery Centre at Bardon Mill in the Northumberland National Park.

The tree appears, in a digital recreation, in the 2025 post-apocalyptic coming-of-age horror film 28 Years Later.

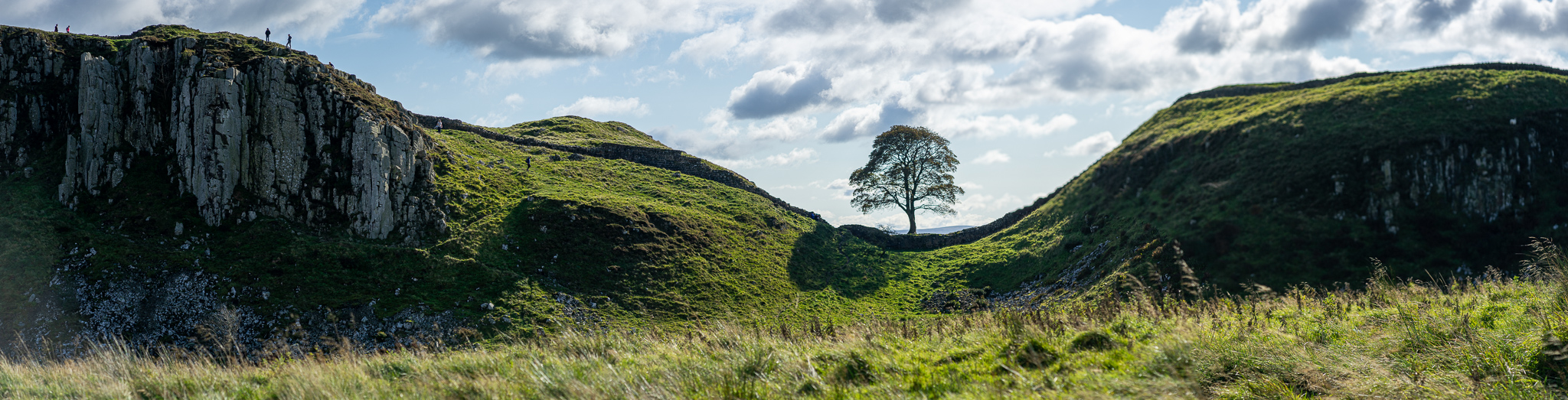
Sycamore Gap panorama

== See also ==
- List of individual trees
- Heritage tree
