= Milecastle 15 =

Milecastle on Hadrian's Wall in England

- Northumberland, England, UK
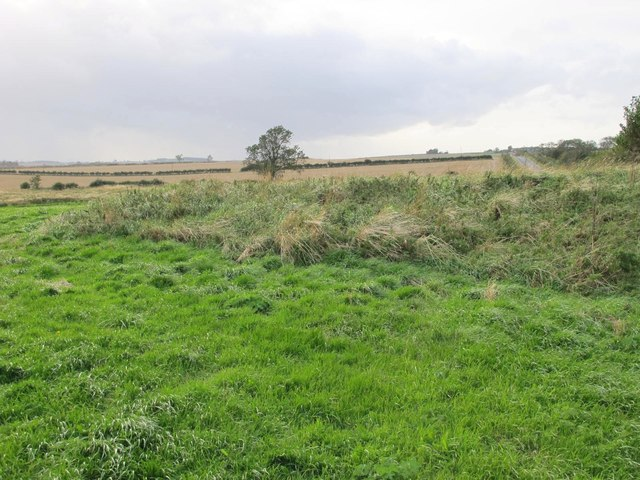
- The site of Milecastle 15

Location
- Location in Northumberland
- Coordinates: 55.005644°N 1.856962°W
- Grid reference: NZ09246790

Milecastle 15 (Whitchester) was a milecastle of the Roman Hadrian's Wall. Its remains exist as a bold platform with robbed walls located on the southern side of the B6318 Military Road approximately 3 kilometres (1.9 mi) west of its crossing of the A69 road. It has not been excavated.

== Construction ==
Milecastle 15 was a long-axis milecastle of unknown gateway type. Long-axis milecastles were thought to have been constructed by either the Legio VI Victrix who were based in Eboracum (York) or the Legio XX Valeria Victrix who were based in Deva Victrix (Chester).

== Excavations and investigations ==
- 1958 – The milecastle is identified from an RAF aerial photo.
- 1966 – English Heritage Field Investigation. It was noted that the milecastle was a long-axis type.
- 1989 – English Heritage Field Investigation. It was noted that the platform survives up to approximately 1.0 metre (3.3 ft) high with ragged robber trenches around the crest on east, south and west sides.

== Associated turrets ==
Each milecastle on Hadrian's Wall had two associated turret structures. These turrets were positioned approximately one-third and two-thirds of a Roman mile to the west of the Milecastle, and would probably have been manned by part of the milecastle's garrison. The turrets associated with Milecastle 15 are known as Turret 15A and Turret 15B.

=== Turret 15A ===
Turret 15A was located in the expected position in 1931. Only one course remained. An English Heritage Field Investigation in 1966 noted that the Turret was covered by the modern road.

Location on Ordnance Survey 1:25 000 map: 55.007001°N 1.864727°W

=== Turret 15B ===
Turret 15B was thought to have been located in 1931, in the expected position. The 1931 investigation reported little more than footing. An English Heritage Field Investigation in 1966 noted that the Turret was covered by the modern road, and a further English Heritage Field Investigation in 1989 cast doubt on whether the footings reported in 1931 were sufficient evidence for the existence of the turret at this location.

Location on Ordnance Survey 1:25 000 map: 55.008241°N 1.872541°W

== Monument records ==
Monument	Monument Number	English Heritage Archive Number
Milecastle 15	20378	NZ 06 NE 2
Turret 15A	20381	NZ 06 NE 3
Turret 15B	20384	NZ 06 NE 4

== Bibliography ==
- Daniels, Charles (1979), "Review: Fact and Theory on Hadrian's Wall", Britannia, 10: 357–364, JSTOR 526069
