= Sleightholme (disambiguation) =

Sleightholme may refer to

== Places ==
- Sleightholme, a hamlet in County Durham (formerly in the North Riding of Yorkshire), England
- Sleightholme Dale, a valley in the North York Moors, North Yorkshire, England

== People ==
- John Sleightholme, English football investor
- Jon Sleightholme (born 1972), English rugby union footballer
- Ollie Sleightholme (born 2000), English rugby union footballer
