= West Rigg Open Cutting =

Site of Special Scientific Interest in County Durham, England

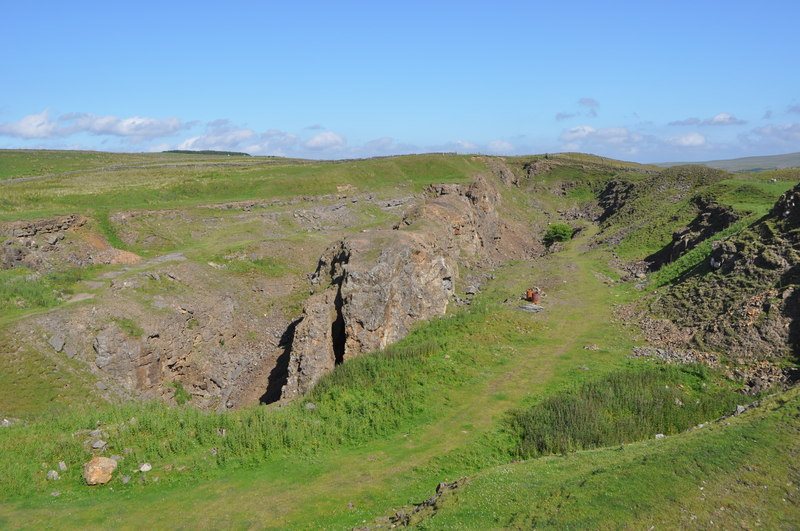
- The disused West Rigg open-cast iron-stone mine.

- Location within County Durham
- Location: MAGiC MaP
- Nearest town: Stanhope, County Durham
- Coordinates: 54°44′50″N 2°8′20″W
- Area: 4.8 ha (12 acres)
- Established: 1968
- Governing body: Natural England
- Website: West Rigg Open Cutting SSSI

West Rigg Open Cutting is a Site of Special Scientific Interest in the Wear Valley district of west County Durham, England. It is a disused ironstone quarry, located just over 1 km north of the village of Westgate, in Weardale.

At West Rigg, the Slitt Vein, a 20 km-long quartz intrusion in the Namurian Great Limestone, is exposed at the surface; the exposure is up to 5 m wide over a distance of some 200 m. During Late Permian times, extensive mineralisation occurred in the vicinity of the Slitt Vein: high salinity fluids, rich in iron, permeated the Great Limestone which, throughout its full thickness, was mineralised, producing siderite and ankerite minerals which were subsequently oxidised, yielding a limonitic ore with an iron content of over 40 per cent. At West Rigg, the iron mineralisation extends up to 60 m on each side of the vein.

The Slitt Vein is predominantly composed of quartz, with smaller amounts of fluorite and uneconomic amounts of galena lead ore. The earliest mining activity at the site was the extraction of fluorite and galena from the Slitt Vein itself: the miners worked from levels driven into the vein from the west. In the late 19th century, quarrying of the ironstone began, the Slitt Vein being left untouched so that today it protrudes as a vertical 'rib' along the centre of the quarry.

The Geological Conservation Review has identified the site as being of national importance because it provides an accessible illustration of the formation of iron ore by replacement and oxidation. The site also offers a rare surface view of the Slitt Vein.

== See also ==
- Sleightholme Beck Gorge – The Troughs and Brunton Bank Quarry, two other north-east England SSSI sites at which the Namurian Great Limestone is exposed.
