= Planetrees (Hadrian's Wall section) =

Historic site in north England

- Northumberland, England, UK
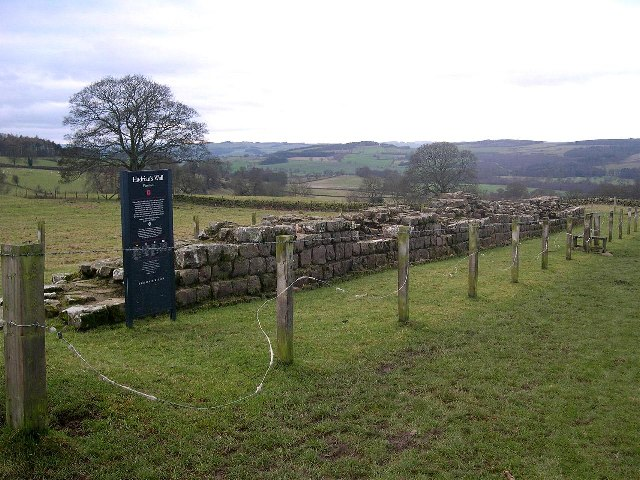
- Hadrian's Wall at Planetrees

Location
- Location in Northumberland
- Coordinates: 55.021042°N 2.112456°W
- Grid reference: NY92906961

Planetrees is an extant section of Hadrian's Wall named after the farm located around 250 metres (270 yd) to the west. The surviving section is 35 metres (115 ft) in length.

== William Hutton intervention ==
It is said that this section was saved by the intervention of William Hutton in 1801. During his visit to Hadrian's Wall, he encountered a workman robbing stone from this stretch for use in the construction of a nearby farmhouse, and persuaded the workman to desist:

At the twentieth-mile stone, I should have seen a piece of Severus's Wall seven feet and a half high, and two hundred and twenty-four yards long: a sight not to be found in the whole line. But the proprietor, Henry Tulip, Esq. is now taking it down, to erect a farm-house with the materials. Ninety-five yards are already destroyed, and the stones, fit for building removed. . . . I desired the servant with whom I conversed, "to give my compliments to Mr. Tulip, and request him to desist, or he would wound the whole body of Antiquaries. As he was putting an end to the most noble monument of Antiquity in the whole Island, they would feel every stroke. If the Wall was of no estimation, he must have a mean opinion of me, who would travel six hundred miles to see it; and if it was, he could never merit my thanks for destroying it."

== Construction ==
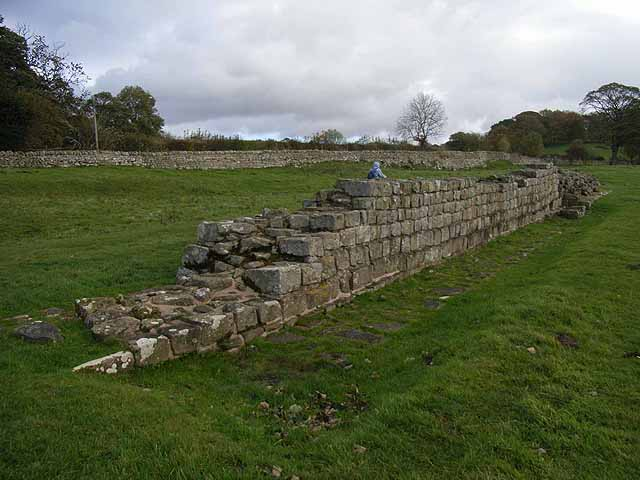
Southern aspect of the wall section, showing the join between Broad Wall and Narrow Wall construction

The eastern part of the surviving section (approximately 20 metres (66 ft) in length) is built as Broad Wall, 10 Roman Feet wide. The eastern section (approximately 15 metres (49 ft) in length is built as Narrow Wall, 8 Roman Feet wide, yet still on foundations clearly installed for a Broad Wall. The join is archeologically interesting, as it suggests a change in plan during construction.

Also present on the narrow wall stretch is a culvert. The stones forming the culvert cross the whole width of the foundation (built for the broad wall), suggesting that the culverts were constructed at the same time as the foundations, rather than along with the curtain wall.

== Excavations and investigations ==
- 1989 - English Heritage Field Investigation on 7 September, under the Hadrian's Wall Project. It was noted that this stretch demonstrates a change from Narrow Wall, 1.75 metres (5.7 ft) wide [west part], to Broad Wall, 2.8 metres (9.2 ft) wide [east end].

== Monument Records ==
Monument	Monument Number	English Heritage Archive Number
Planetrees	1009743	NY 96 NW 123

== Public Access ==
Access is on foot from the Hadrian's Wall National Trail.

== Bibliography ==
- Daniels, Charles (1979), "Review: Fact and Theory on Hadrian's Wall", Britannia, 10: 357–364, doi:10.2307/526069, JSTOR 526069
