= Milecastle 23 =

Milecastle in Northumberland, England

- Northumberland, England, UK
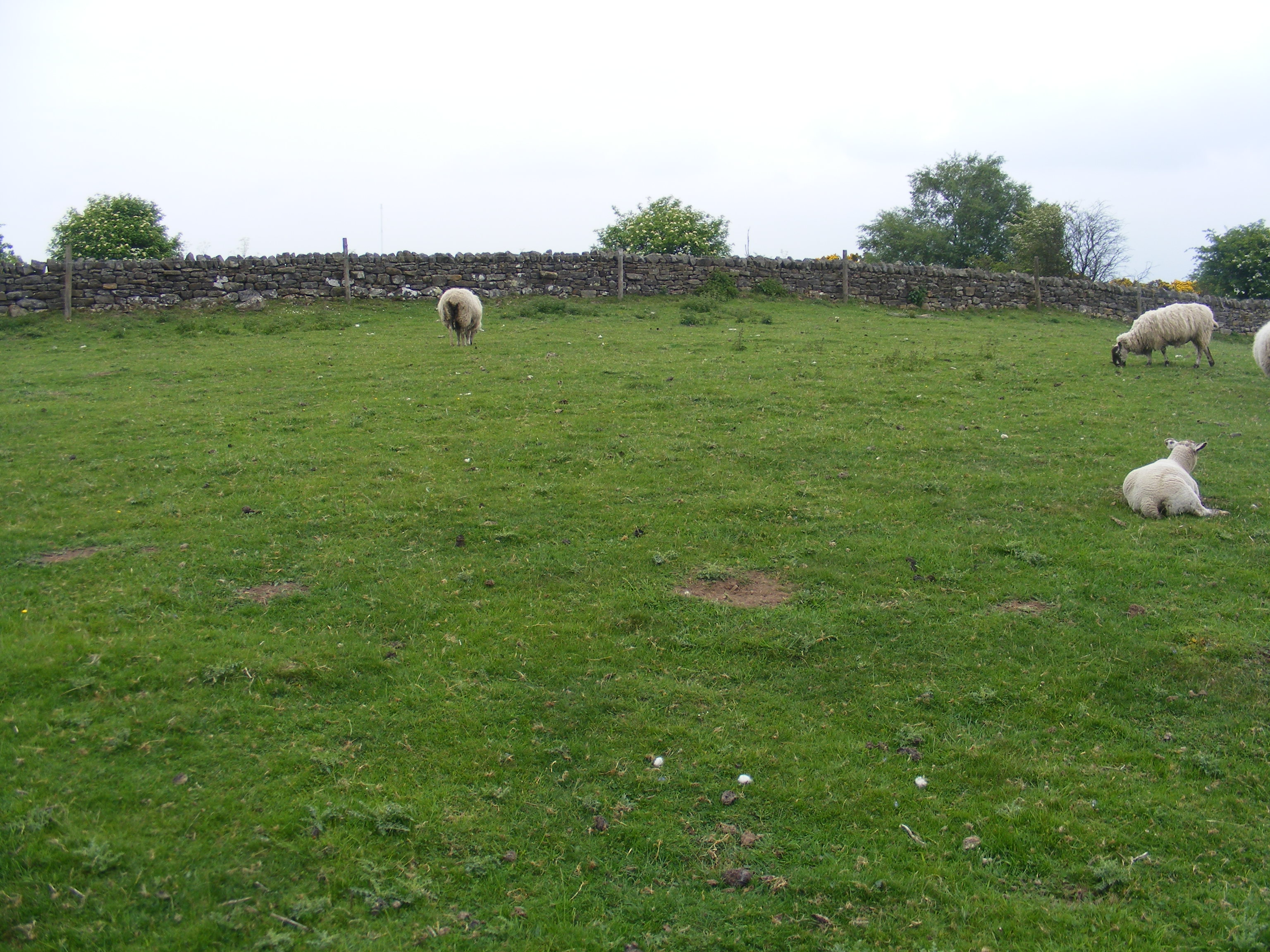
- Site of Milecastle 23

Location
- Location in Northumberland
- Coordinates: 55.014932°N 2.040394°W
- Grid reference: NY97516893

Milecastle 23 (Stanley) was a milecastle of the Roman Hadrian's Wall. Its remains exist as a low, grass covered platform with traces of an external ditch (as Milecastle 25). It is located to the south of the B6318 Military Road around 1.5 kilometres (0.93 mi) west of its junction with the A68.

== Construction ==
Milecastle 23 was a long-axis milecastle. The gateway type is unknown, though long-axis milecastles were thought to have been constructed by the Legio VI Victrix who were based in Eboracum (York).

The milecastle measured 15.24 metres (50.0 ft) across, and had broad east and west walls (the curtain wall at this point was also broad gauge). The width of the south wall is unknown.

The ditch at the point corresponding to the milecastle's north gate undergoes a slight change in profile in the bottom. Also, there is an 8-metre (26 ft) gap in the upcast mound at the same point. These features indicate the existence of a causeway, later removed. There was also evidence of an equivalent causeway across the vallum, and gaps in the vallum mounds (also removed).

== Excavations and investigations ==
- 1930 – The milecastle was located by T Hepple and identified as a long-axis milecastle with broad east and west walls. The traces of the milecastle ditch were also noted.
- 1952 – The corresponding part of the vallum was surveyed, and the possible previous existence of a causeway discovered.
- 1966 – English Heritage Field Investigation. It was noted that the site was marked by an earth mound 1.2 metres (3.9 ft) high, extensively spread by cultivation. The ditch was visible as a wide but superficial depression around the South, East and West sides.
- 1989 – English Heritage Field Investigation. It was noted that the milecastle survived as a platform up to 1 metre (3.3 ft) high. The ditch was superficial but surveyable to the south and east. The possibility of the milecastle being a long-axis milecastle was restated.

== Associated turrets ==
Each milecastle on Hadrian's Wall had two associated turret structures. These turrets were positioned approximately one-third and two-thirds of a Roman mile to the west of the Milecastle, and would probably have been manned by part of the milecastle's garrison. The turrets associated with Milecastle 23 are known as Turret 23A and Turret 23B.

=== Turret 23A ===
No surface traces remain of Turret 23A (Stanley Plantation). Its position was established in 1920, though its remains lie beneath the B6318 Military Road.

Location on Ordnance Survey 1:25 000 map: 55.015963°N 2.047949°W

=== Turret 23B ===
No surface traces remain of Turret 23B (Wall Fell). Its position was established in 1920 purely by reference to the position of Turret 23A, though this cannot be confirmed as remains lie beneath the B6318 Military Road.

== Monument records ==
Monument	Monument Number	English Heritage Archive Number
Milecastle 23	18177	NY 96 NE 8
Turret 23A	18180	NY 96 NE 9
Turret 23B	18183	NY 96 NE 10

== Public Access ==
Access to the mound marking the Milecastle is via the Hadrian's Wall Path National Trail.

== Bibliography ==
- Daniels, Charles (1979), "Review: Fact and Theory on Hadrian's Wall", Britannia, 10: 357–364, doi:10.2307/526069, JSTOR 526069
