= Harlow Hill, Northumberland =

Village in Northumberland, England

Coordinates: 55.009°N 1.879°W

Harlow Hill
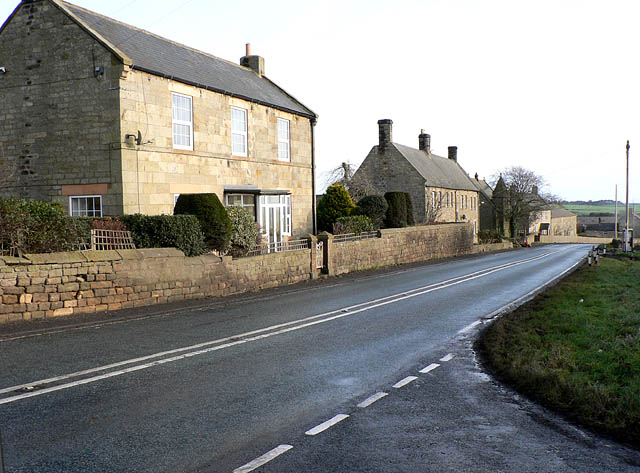

- Location within Northumberland
- OS grid reference: NZ078683
- Civil parish: Stamfordham
- Unitary authority: Northumberland
- Ceremonial county: Northumberland
- Region: North East
- Country: England
- Sovereign state: United Kingdom
- Post town: Newcastle-upon-Tyne
- Postcode district: NE15
- Dialling code: 01661
- Police: Northumbria
- Fire: Northumberland
- Ambulance: North East
- UK Parliament: Hexham
- Website: Stamfordham Parish Council

Harlow Hill is a small village in the civil parish of Stamfordham, in Northumberland, England.

Harlow Hill lies on the line of Hadrian's Wall, and is the site of Milecastle 16. The Military Road also passes by the village.

Harlow Hill was historically a township in the ancient parish of Ovingham. It became a separate civil parish in 1866. The civil parish was abolished on 1 April 1955, when it was merged with other parishes to create the civil parish of Stamfordham. In 1951 the parish had a population of 61.
