= Brunton Bank Quarry =

Disused quarry in Northumberland, England

- Site of Special Scientific Interest
- Location within Northumberland
- Location of Brunton Bank Quarry.
- Area of search: Northumberland
- Grid reference: NY928698
- Coordinates: 55.023714°N 2.112861°W
- Interest: Geological
- Area: 2.18 hectares (5 acres)
- Notification date: 1969
- Location map: DEFRA MAGIC map

Brunton Bank Quarry is a disused quarry now designated as a Site of Special Scientific Interest (SSSI) in Northumberland, North East England. The quarry exposes a base layer of the Namurian Great Limestone stratigraphic unit, including the Chaetetes Band, the fossilised fauna within which is of current geological interest.

== Location and natural features ==
Brunton Bank Quarry is situated in the south-west of the county of Northumberland, some 0.7 miles (1.1 km) south-west of Chollerford and 3.8 miles (6.1 km) north of Hexham. The 2.16 hectares (5.3 acres) site at High Brunton lies to the north of the B6318 road and Hadrian's Wall, which runs immediately south of the road; it is 0.2 miles (0.32 km) north of Turret 26A. The quarry's elevation is between 150 metres (490 ft) and 160 metres (520 ft) above sea level.

Brunton Bank Quarry is one of a number of SSSIs which expose the Namurian Great Limestone; others include Sleightholme Beck Gorge – The Troughs and West Rigg Open Cutting, both to the south of this site, in County Durham.

An ancient tumulus is noted within the boundary of the site.

== Geology ==
Brunton Bank Quarry is identified as an important geological site in the UK's Geological Conservation Review, for its stratigraphic and palaeontological characteristics. It provides an excellent exposure of the reef-like biostromic Chaetetes Band of the Namurian Great Limestone, the affinities of the flora of which is a subject of contemporary study: the quarry constitutes a leading site for such studies. The site is the type locality of the eponymous fossil species Calcifolium bruntonense.

The condition of Brunton Bank Quarry was judged to be favourable in a 2013 inspection, which noted recent scrub clearance.

== See also ==
- List of Sites of Special Scientific Interest in Northumberland
