= Beamish, County Durham =

Village in County Durham, England

Coordinates: 54.875°N 1.650°W

Beamish
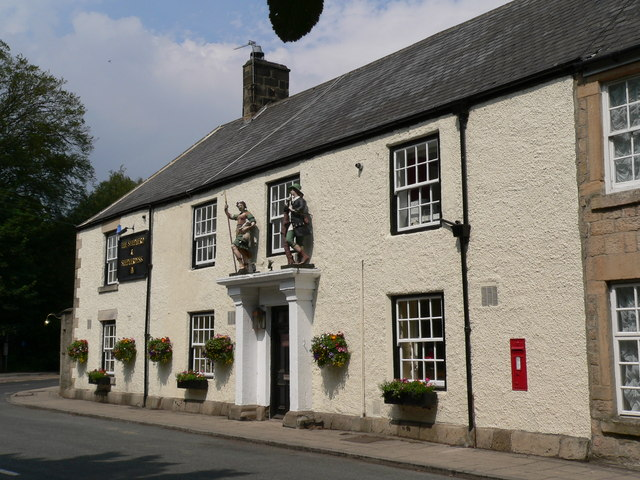
- Shepherd and Shepherdess, Beamish

- Location within County Durham
- OS grid reference: NZ225535
- Unitary authority: County Durham
- Ceremonial county: County Durham
- Region: North East
- Country: England
- Sovereign state: United Kingdom
- Post town: STANLEY
- Postcode district: DH9
- Dialling code: 01207
- Police: Durham
- Fire: County Durham and Darlington
- Ambulance: North East
- UK Parliament: North Durham

Beamish, previously named "Pit Hill", is a village in County Durham, England, situated to the north east of Stanley.

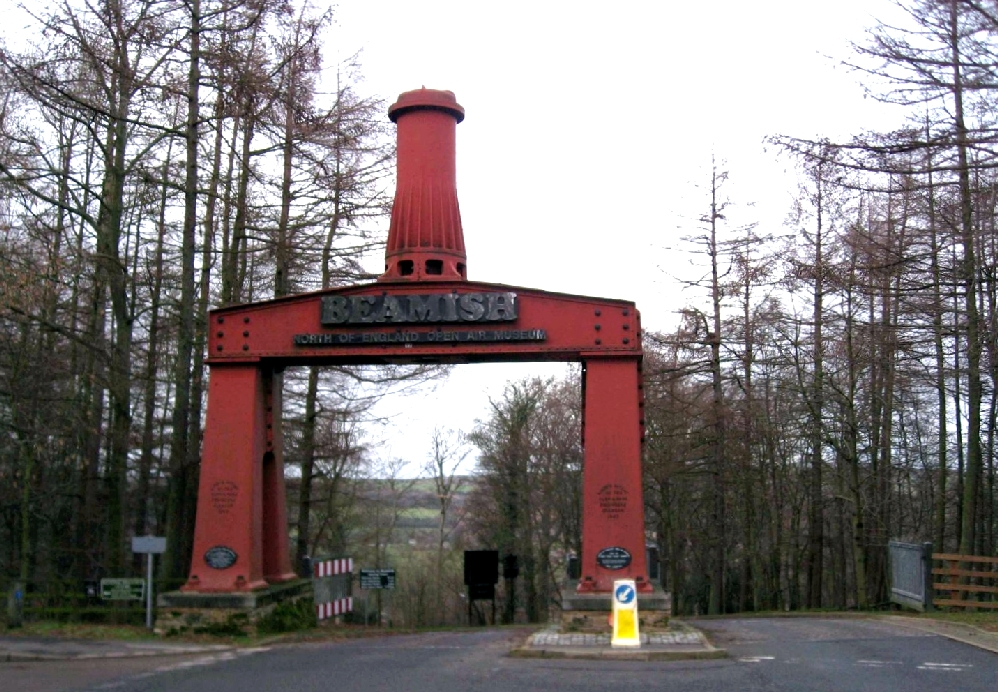
The entrance to Beamish Museum

The village is contained within Hell Hole Wood and is home to Beamish Museum, an open-air museum seeking to replicate a northern town of the early 20th century. Its principal public house is the Shepherd and Shepherdess, near the Beamish Museum entrance.

To the south is the village of No Place (also called Co-operative Villas). North West Beamish lies in the conservation area of Beamish Burn.

Pockerley Manor, inside Beamish Museum

To the north of Beamish, Pockerley Manor preserves a rare though altered example of a Peel tower in County Durham, probably dating from the 15th century with later alterations and additions. It is attached to a later farmhouse and the building is now known as Pockerley Manor. The tower has living accommodation built over a stone basement, the first floor reached through a stair built into the thickness of the wall, and the roof is largely original.
