= Sleightholme Beck Gorge – The Troughs =

Protected area in County Durham, England

Sleightholme Beck Gorge - The Troughs
- Location within County Durham
- Location: MAGiC MaP
- Nearest town: Barnard Castle
- Coordinates: 54°30′10″N 2°3′12″W
- Area: 7.5 ha (19 acres)
- Established: 1976
- Governing body: Natural England
- Website: Sleightholme Beck Gorge – The Troughs SSSI

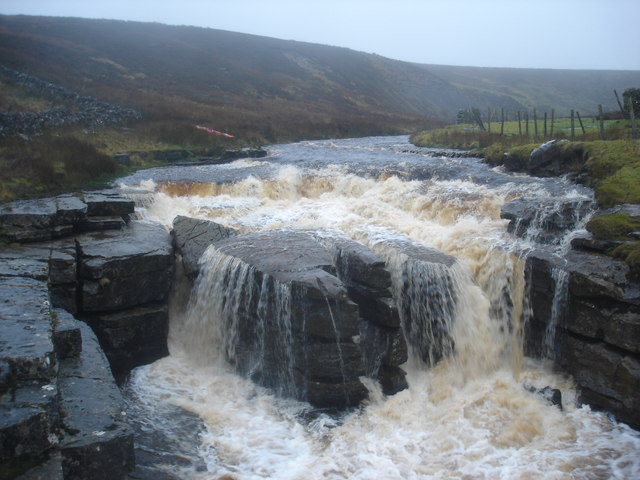
Top drop of the Trough. This is the top fall of the Trough, a 100m limestone gorge in Sleightholme Beck, seen in wet conditions high enough to paddle a kayak down the stream to this point.

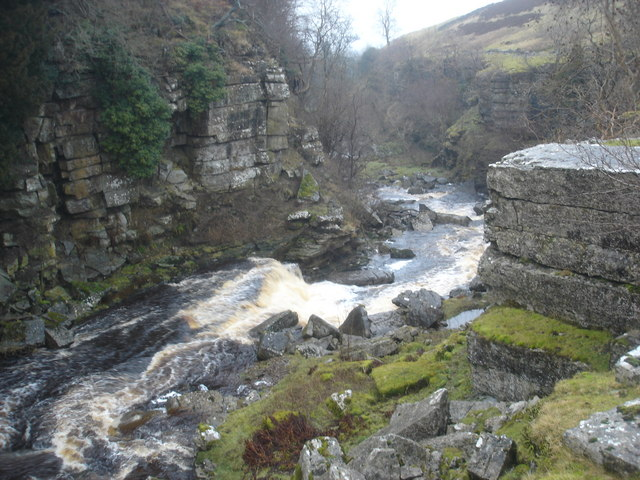
Bottom of the trough

Sleightholme Beck Gorge – The Troughs is a Site of Special Scientific Interest in the County Durham district of south-west County Durham, England. The site covers a gorge in the valley of Sleightholme Beck between the hamlet of Sleightholme and the confluence with the River Greta, some 3 km upriver from the village of Bowes. The trough is 200m east of the border with Wytham Moor, part of the neighbouring Bowes Moor SSSI.

The site has both biological and geological interest and has been designated of national importance in the Geological Conservation Review.

The gorge is incised through the Namurian Great Limestone and is of particular interest because beds of sandstone in the middle of the section show structures characteristic of a shoreline, with the features of a river delta and barrier bar.

The shallow soils that have developed on ledges and crevices in the limestone and on the scree slopes support a vegetation in which ferns such as maidenhair spleenwort, Asplenium trichomanes, green spleenwort, A. viride, and brittle bladder fern, Cystopteris fragilis, are prominent. Woodland plants such as wood sorrel, Oxalis acetosella, wood millet, Milium effusum, and dog's mercury, Mercurialis perennis, have established themselves in the shadier crevices, while rue-leaved saxifrage, Saxifraga tridactylites, shining cranesbill Geranium lucidum, and common whitlow grass, Erophila verna, occur in the most exposed situations. On the most inaccessible valley slopes, there is open woodland in which yew, Taxus baccata, is abundant.

Dipper and common sandpiper have been recorded from the site and probably breed in the area.

== See also ==
- West Rigg Open Cutting and Brunton Bank Quarry, two other north-east England SSSI sites at which the Namurian Great Limestone is exposed.
