= Once Brewed =

Village in Northumberland, England

Coordinates: 55.001°N 2.385°W

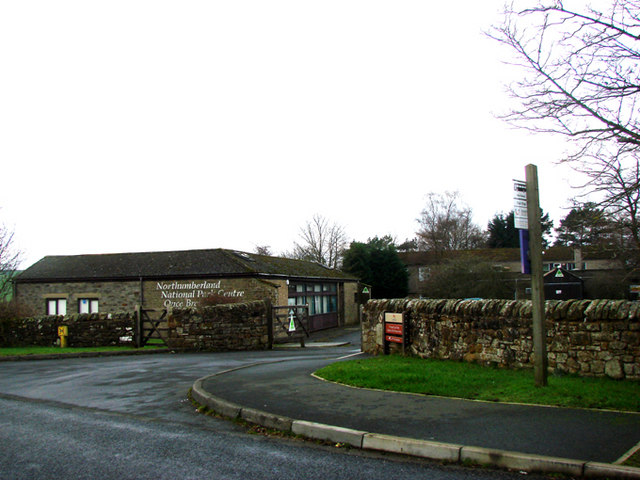
- National Park Centre at Once Brewed, now replaced by The Sill

- Location within Northumberland
- OS grid reference: NY755675
- Unitary authority: Northumberland
- Ceremonial county: Northumberland
- Region: North East
- Country: England
- Sovereign state: United Kingdom
- Post town: HEXHAM
- Postcode district: NE47
- Police: Northumbria
- Fire: Northumberland
- Ambulance: North East
- UK Parliament: Hexham

Once Brewed (also known as Twice Brewed or Once Brewed/Twice Brewed) is a village in Northumberland, England. It lies on the Military Road (B6318). A motorist arriving over the B6318 from the east will see the place name shield "Once Brewed", while those coming from the west will read "Twice Brewed".

Once Brewed lies just south of Hadrian's Wall, which runs along the top of the Whin Sill ridge above the village to the north. The Roman fort of Vindolanda is a couple of miles away to the south-east. The Roman earthwork known as the Vallum runs right past Once Brewed, adjoining and also overlain by the Military Road.

== Toponymy ==
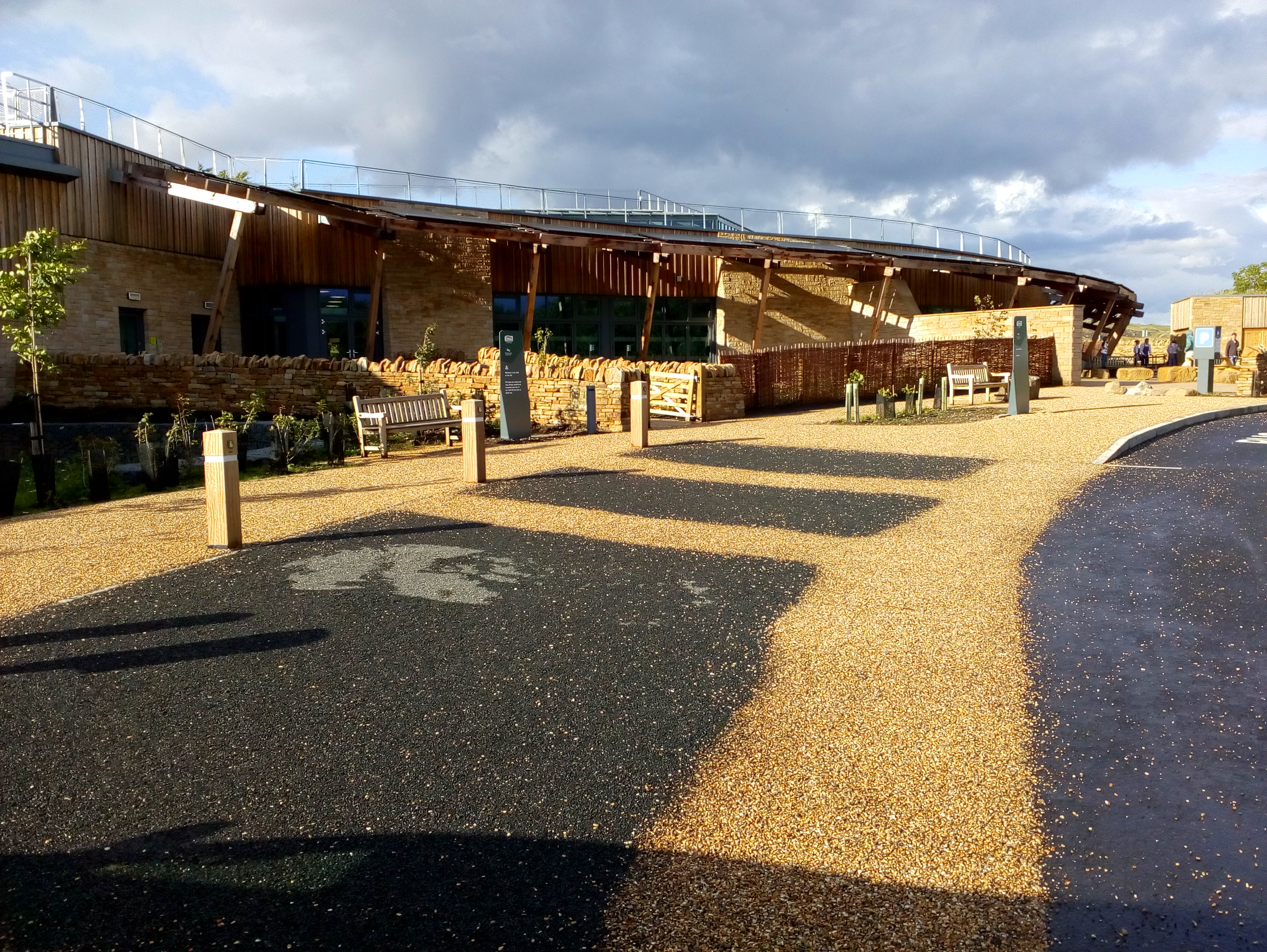
The new youth hostel and Visitor Centre is called "The Sill".

According to a sign in the Once Brewed Youth Hostel, there first was the Twice Brewed Inn, and the youth hostel was therefore called "Once Brewed". The "Once Brewed" closed in 2015/6 and was rebuilt as "The Sill". The Sill Visitor Centre and café was officially opened by Prince Charles in 2018.

== Location ==
The village consists of the Twice Brewed Inn, a combined YHA youth hostel and Visitor Centre to the Northumberland National Park ('The Sill'), and also some farms. One of the farms is a bit further away, and is called "West Twice Brewed" on the Ordnance Survey maps.

Both the Twice Brewed Inn and the youth hostel are popular sleeping places for walkers on the Hadrian's Wall Path and the Pennine Way.

The village of Iverton, which appears on 18th-century maps of Northumberland and latterly in two probate records from the 1830s, appears to have been coextensive with, or in very close proximity to, Twice Brewed. R. G. Collingwood, writing in 1921, identifies Iverton with Everton, a "ruined farm half a mile [one kilometre] west of Chesterholm", or roughly the distance between Chesterholm and Twice Brewed. No farm of that name appears on Ordnance Survey maps from the 1920s or earlier, however. It is possible that the name of the Twice Brewed Inn gradually became attached to the buildings around Everton as the latter fell into disrepair.

The same maps place 'Forsten', another no longer extant Northumberland village, just across Bradley Burn from Once Brewed. Collingwood's identification of Forsten with Fourstones near Hexham thus appears to be mistaken.

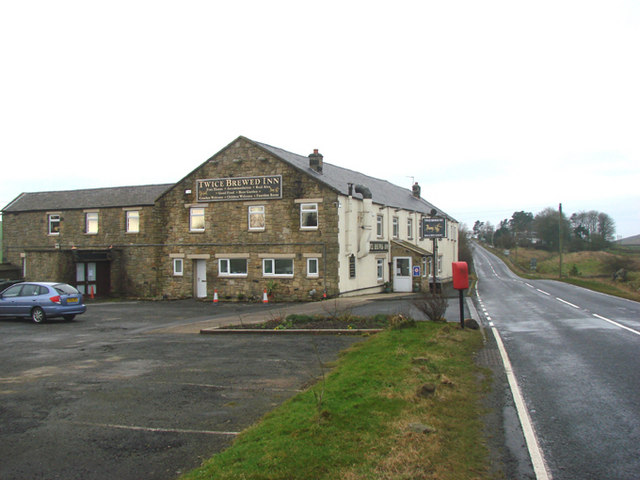
Twice Brewed Inn

=== Twice Brewed Inn ===
There are several stories which explain the name of the inn. The most romantic story has it that on the eve of the Battle of Hexham in 1464, Yorkist foot soldiers demanded their beer be brewed again because it lacked its usual fighting strength. The ploy worked as the Lancastrian army later fled after an early morning raid against the rejuvenated troops. A more prosaic explanation is that 18th-century farmers tended to brew (and serve) weak ale, and hence "twice brewed" meant the inn offered stronger ale. A third theory is that Hadrian's Wall snakes its way across the brows, or "brews", of two hills where there is also a meeting of a pair of drovers’ roads.

The antiquarian William Hutton walked the length of Hadrian's Wall in 1801 and stayed one night at the Twice Brewed inn. He describes how a pudding was cooked "as big as a peck measure" and "a piece of beef ... perhaps equal to half a calf". Although the inn was full, the landlady was able after some delay to find him a bed for the night.

== Governance ==
Once Brewed is in the parliamentary constituency of Hexham. Joe Morris (Labour) is the Member of Parliament.

Before Brexit, its residents voted to elect MEPs for the North East England constituency in the European Parliament.

For Local Government purposes it belongs to Northumberland County Council a unitary authority, with Once Brewed lying in the Tynedale Division. Prior to the 2009 structural changes to local government in England it was part of Tynedale Council.
