= Sleightholme =

Hamlet in County Durham, England

Coordinates: 54.48724°N 2.07018°W

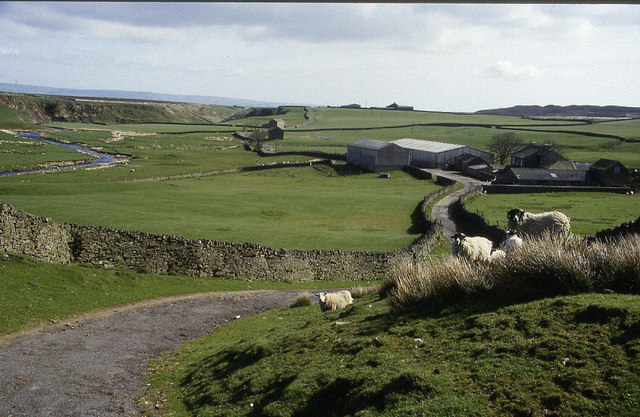
- Sleightholme Moor Road

- Location within County Durham
- OS grid reference: NY955102
- Civil parish: Bowes
- Unitary authority: County Durham
- Ceremonial county: County Durham
- Region: North East
- Country: England
- Sovereign state: United Kingdom
- Police: Durham
- Fire: County Durham and Darlington
- Ambulance: North East

Sleightholme /ˈsliːtəm/ is a secluded hamlet on a dead end road in County Durham, England. It lies beside Sleightholme Beck, a tributary of the River Greta. The nearest town is Bowes, 4 miles away.

The name, first recorded in 1254, is believed to come from the Old Norse sletta holmr, meaning "flat ground near water". The place was historically in the North Riding of Yorkshire, and was transferred to County Durham in 1974.

The Pennine Way passes through Sleightholme. Below the hamlet Sleightholme Beck passes through a narrow valley, known as The Troughs, which is a Site of Special Scientific Interest.
