= No Place (film) =

2005 film

- Directed by: Clive Frayne, Steve O'Brien
- Written by: Clive Frayne, Steve O'Brien
- Produced by: Steve O'Brien
- Starring: Colin Sharp; Rob Turnbull
- Cinematography: Steve O'Brien
- Edited by: Su Cosgrove; Michael Pentney; John McMullin
- Music by: Dan Bewick
- Production company: 24:25 Films
- Distributed by: 24:25 Films
- Release date: 5 June 2005 (Tyneside Cinema)
- Running time: 80 minutes
- Country: United Kingdom
- Language: English

No Place is a drama-thriller film written, directed and independently produced by Cive Frayne and Steve O'Brien, who was also the Cinematographer. It was filmed in Northumberland, North East of England.

Screenings were presented at the Tyneside Cinema, Cinéma Olympia - Cannes, One Aldwych - London
