= Milecastle 25 =

Milecastle on Hadrian's Wall in England

- Northumberland, England, UK
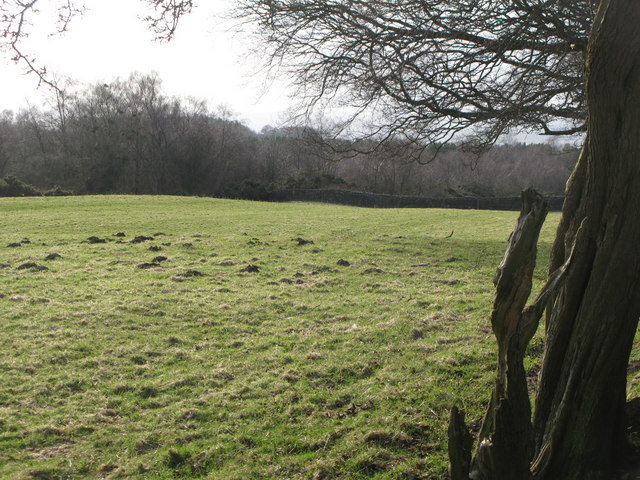
- The site of Milecastle 25

Location
- Location in Northumberland
- Coordinates: 55.019177°N 2.086113°W
- Grid reference: NY94596940

Milecastle 25 (Codlawhill) was a milecastle of the Roman Hadrian's Wall. Its remains exist as a low platform, and are located to the south of the B6318 Military Road (about 1 metre (3.3 ft) high), nearly 5 kilometres (3.1 mi) to the west of its junction with the A68.

== Construction ==
Milecastle 25 is believed to be a long-axis milecastle with unknown gateways type. Such milecastles were thought to have been constructed by the legio VI Victrix who were based in Eboracum (York). The milecastle measured 15.24 metres (50.0 ft) across, and had broad east and west walls (the curtain wall at this point was also broad gauge). The north gateway and wall are beneath the road. There are possible traces of a milecastle ditch to the south, but no traces of a spur from the Military Way despite evidence of causeways over both the ditch and vallum ditch at this point.

== Excavations and investigations ==
- 1930 – The location was established. Excavations by T Hepple established the width thickness of the side walls.
- 1946 – Aerial photograph by the RAF.
- 1966 – English Heritage Field Investigation. It was noted that the remains consisted of a low mutilated grassy platform, with superficial traces of a ditch on its south side.

== Associated turrets ==
Each milecastle on Hadrian's Wall had two associated turret structures. These turrets were positioned approximately one-third and two-thirds of a Roman mile to the west of the Milecastle, and would probably have been manned by part of the milecastle's garrison. The turrets associated with Milecastle 25 are known as Turret 25A and Turret 25B.

=== Turret 25A ===
Turret 25A (Hill Head) is probably located slightly to the east of Hill Head Farm. Although located in 1930 by T Hepple, trenching (10 feet (3.0 m) square by 4 feet (1.2 m) deep) in 1959 failed to relocate the turret. It was concluded that a scatter of large sandstones had been mistaken by Hepple for the turret's wall.

Location on Ordnance Survey 1:25 000 map: 55.019530°N 2.094450°W

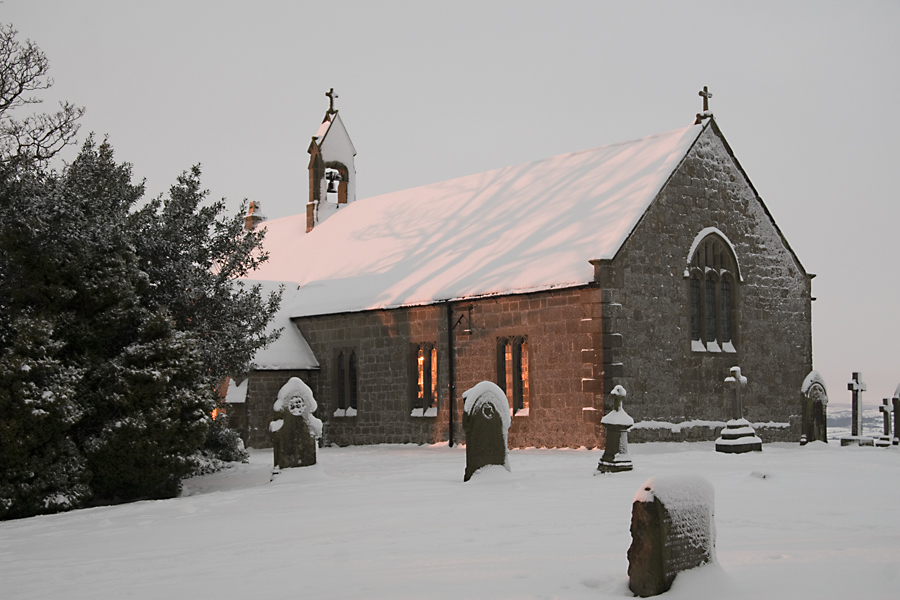
St Oswald's Church, Heavenfield

=== Turret 25B ===
Turret 25B (St Oswald's) is located to the south west of St Oswald's Church at Heavenfield, and no visible remains exist. It was first excavated in 1930 by T Hepple, (to establish location only). Three to four courses of the South face were discovered. Further excavation took place in 1959. Its internal dimensions were found to be 3.45 metres (11.3 ft) (North – South) and 4.16 metres (13.6 ft) (East-West). The north wall was found to be 1.6 metres (5.2 ft) thick, with the remaining walls being 0.91 metres (3.0 ft) thick. Its construction is of a type generally associated with Legio XX Valeria Victrix but no evidence was found for an occupation later than late Antoninus Pius period. Sherds from as many as fifty flagons were also found, along with more amphora sherds than would be expected. Five gaming pieces were found outside the North-West corner of the turret, possibly indicating the existence of a window in the west wall. Further objects of copper and iron, including an arrowhead, were found. The walls were constructed with mortar. The floor was constructed from clay containing mortar, and there were dumps of this substance found outside the walls. The internal south-west corner was marked off by boulders as a working area, with a hearth (renewed twice). A platform was later added against the south wall. A path led from the turret, with traces of a wall evident on its left.

Location on Ordnance Survey 1:25 000 map: 55.019641°N 2.101832°W

== Monument records ==
Monument	Monument Number	English Heritage Archive Number
Milecastle 25	18282	NY 96 NW 1
Turret 25A	18285	NY 96 NW 2
Turret 25B	18288	NY 96 NW 3

== Bibliography ==
- Daniels, Charles (1979), "Review: Fact and Theory on Hadrian's Wall", Britannia, 10: 357–364, JSTOR 526069
