= Hadrian's Wall Path =

Long-distance footpath in the north of England

Coordinates: 55.03137°N 2.12791°W

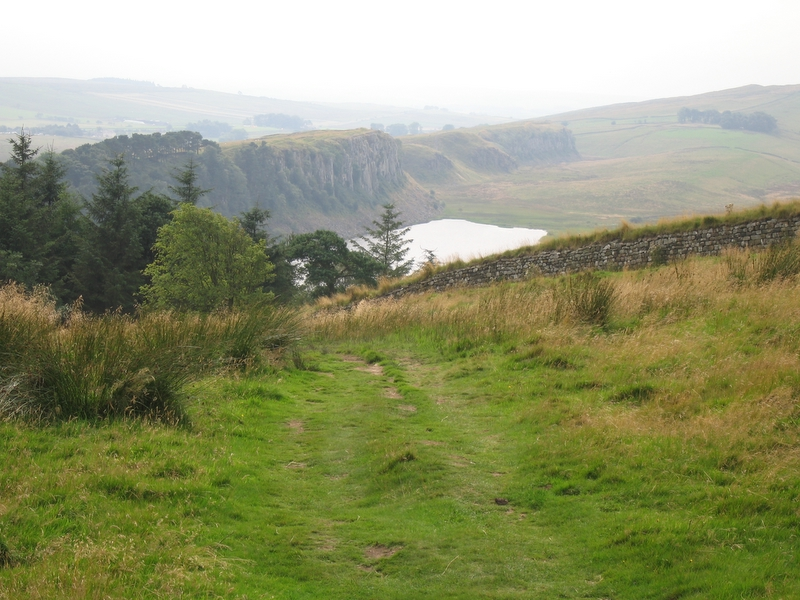
- Crag Lough, a lake near Steel Rigg on the Path. Photo taken from Hotbank Crags. The grass-topped Hadrian's Wall is at right.
- Length: 135 km (84 mi)
- Location: Tyne and Wear; Northumberland; Cumbria
- Designation: National Trail
- Trailheads: Wallsend (east); Bowness-on-Solway (west)
- Use: Hiking
- Highest point: 345 m (1,132 ft), Whinshields Crags
- Difficulty: Moderate
- Waymark
- Sights: Hadrian's Wall World Heritage Site
- Website: www.nationaltrail.co.uk/en_GB/trails/hadrians-wall-path/

Hadrian's Wall Path is a long-distance footpath in the north of England, which became the 15th National Trail in 2003. It runs for 84 miles (135 km), from Wallsend on the east coast of England to Bowness-on-Solway on the west coast. For most of its length it is close to the remains of Hadrian's Wall, the defensive wall built by the Romans on the northern border of their empire. This is now recognised as part of the "Frontiers of the Roman Empire" World Heritage Site.

== Path description ==
Though muddy in places, the walking is relatively easy, as the highest point on the path is only 345 m (1130 ft) high and for much of its length the path is more or less flat. Most of the Wall runs through remote countryside but there are sections that pass through the cities and suburbs of Newcastle and Carlisle. The path is well signposted. For most of the walk there are many signs of human activity, and many other walkers in summer. Though there are villages and farms near to the path, there are not many places to buy food and drink, especially in the middle sections. The section between Chollerford and Walton is the highest and wildest part of the path; it is also where the Wall is most visible, and includes several important Roman forts.

This itinerary breaks the 84-mile (135 km) walk into six reasonable stages, and is presented from east to west (against the prevailing wind).

=== Wallsend to Heddon-on-the-Wall ===
15 miles (24 km)

The path starts at the Roman fort and Museum of Segedunum which sets the historical context for the Wall. Segedunum is also the first / last of the National Trail's Walkers' Passport stamping stations. Most of this section runs through urban areas, including through the centre of Newcastle upon Tyne, and along the banks of the Tyne. Only the last part, leading to Heddon-on-the-Wall, is in open countryside. There are occasional glimpses of the Wall.

=== Heddon-on-the-Wall to Chollerford ===
15.5 miles (25 km)

This section is almost entirely through open countryside, but along a road (the B6318, known as the Military Road). The Wall is occasionally visible, and the adjoining Vallum earthwork is frequently visible on the south side.

=== Chollerford to Steel Rigg ===
12 miles (19 km)

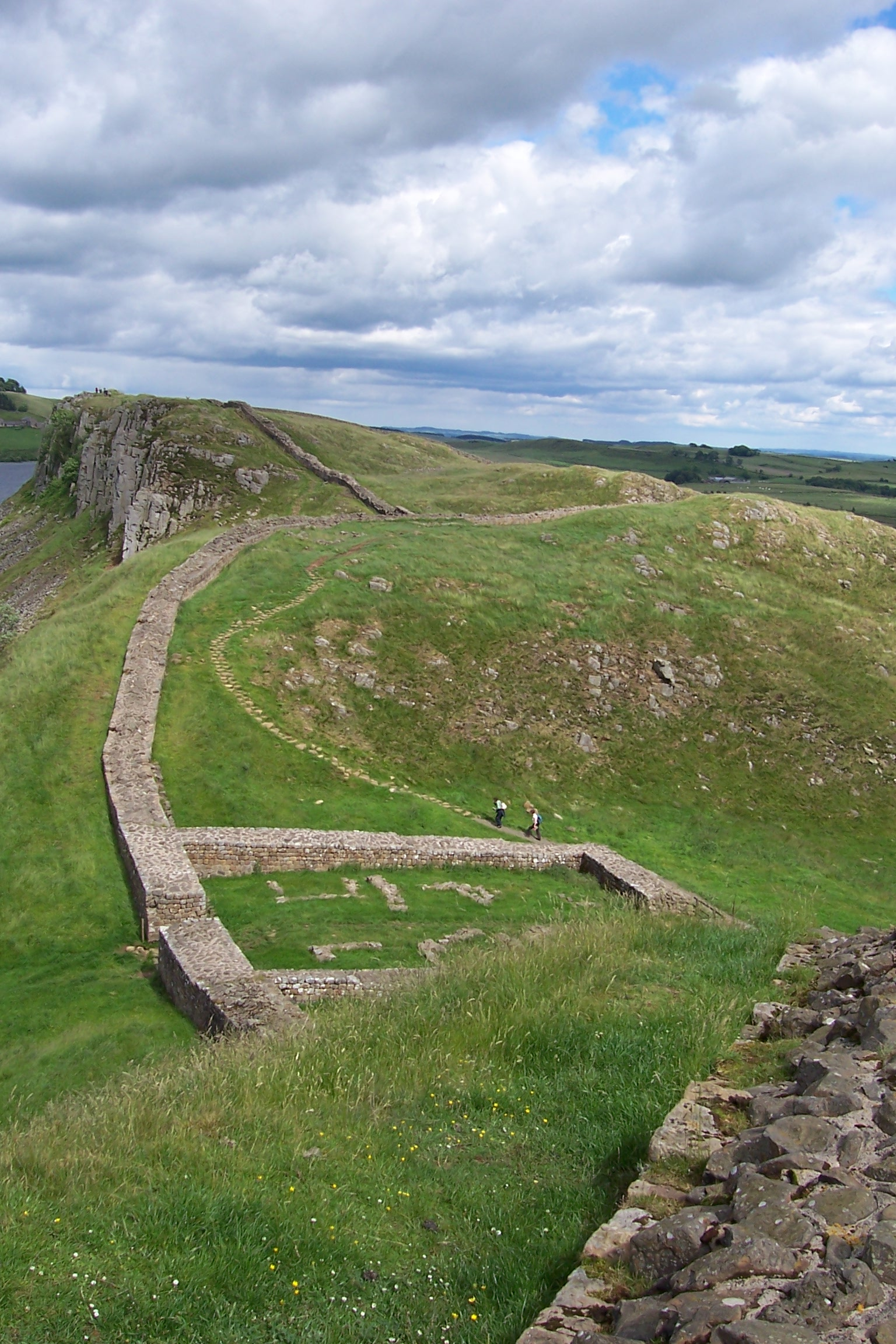
The remains of Milecastle 39 (Castle Nick), a short distance east of Steel Rigg and Peel Crags

Chesters Roman Fort is close to the start of this section. The path starts to rise now and the countryside becomes moorland, rather than farmland. Much more of the Wall is visible and parts of it run along the edge of crags, giving superb views over the open countryside to the north. The path passes the Roman fort at Vercovicium (Housesteads), which has been extensively consolidated and contains much of interest. For very good conservation reasons, nowhere along the route does the Trail follow the crest of Hadrian's Wall but in the small wood on the Whin Sill escarpment at Housesteads there is a short section of Public Right of Way, approximately 150 metres, which is actually on the Wall. The Trail follows a parallel path in the wood but visitors are allowed, if they choose, to walk on the Wall. The Pennine Way National Trail branches off northwards a little to the west of Milecastle 37.

=== Steel Rigg to Walton ===
16.25 miles (26 km)

This is another section across open countryside with the Wall occasionally visible. The Roman fort at Birdoswald has a museum. The Pennine Way long-distance path joins the Hadrian's Wall Path near the village of Greenhead. As the path approaches Walton, Lanercost Priory is a short walk to the south. Much of the Priory was built with stones taken from the Wall.

=== Walton to Carlisle ===
11 miles (18 km)

In this section the path returns to farmland and crosses the M6 motorway. Part of the path is alongside the River Eden, passing through a pleasant park and over a large footbridge.

=== Carlisle to Bowness-on-Solway ===
14.75 miles (24 km)

The first part of this section is rather bare but the walking improves once the path gets beyond the outskirts of Carlisle. Most of the path runs alongside either the River Eden or the Solway Firth. There is nothing of the Wall to be seen but the walking is open and pleasant. The path ends in the village of Bowness-on-Solway, at the end of the wall.

== Access ==
Both Newcastle and Carlisle are on the UK national railway network. The start of the walk at Wallsend can be easily reached by taking a local train from Newcastle to Wallsend Metro Station, which is said to be the only station in the world with bilingual notices in English and Latin. From the station, walk in the opposite direction to the shops along Station Road towards the tall observation tower of Segedunum Roman Fort and Museum.

=== Rail ===
The Tyne Valley railway line runs between Newcastle and Carlisle, with stops at Wylam, Prudhoe, Corbridge, Hexham, Haydon Bridge, Bardon Mill, Haltwhistle, Brampton (1 mile from the town of Brampton) and Wetheral. However for most of its length, the line is not within easy walking distance of the Wall.

=== Car ===
Northumberland National Park operates paying car parks at Brocolitia, Housesteads, Steel Rigg, the Sill National Landscape Discovery Centre, Cawfields quarry and Walltown quarry. Bowness-on-Solway does not have a car park, and anyone thinking of leaving their car in Wallsend while they walk the Trail is advised to consider leaving their car in the long-stay car park at Newcastle airport.

=== Bus ===
There is a Hadrian's Wall bus (service AD122) (note 'Roman' numbering) which runs close to the central section of the Wall during the summer. The bus runs between Hexham, Chesters, Housesteads, Once Brewed, Vindolanda, Walton and Haltwhistle approximately once an hour 0900 – 1700. The service runs daily from Easter until September.

=== Bowness-on-Solway transport options ===
- There is no off-street parking in Bowness-on-Solway, and the streets are very narrow.
- There is one public transport option, the 93 Stagecoach Bus from Carlisle which stops in Bowness 2–3 times on weekdays.
- Other options include paid taxis from Carlisle and free shuttles which are available from some local establishments.

== See also ==
- Hadrian's Wall
- Coast to Coast Walk – a similar alternative, somewhat to the south, from St Bees to Robin Hood's Bay
- Hadrian's Cycleway – a 170-mile (270 km) cycle route from Ravenglass to South Shields, part of the National Cycle Network
- Antonine Wall
- National Trails
- Long-distance footpaths in the United Kingdom
