= Military Road (Northumberland) =

Part of the B6318 road in Northumberland, England

Coordinates: 55.0383°N 2.1948°W

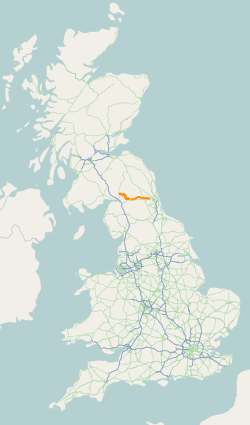
Course of the B6318 in orange

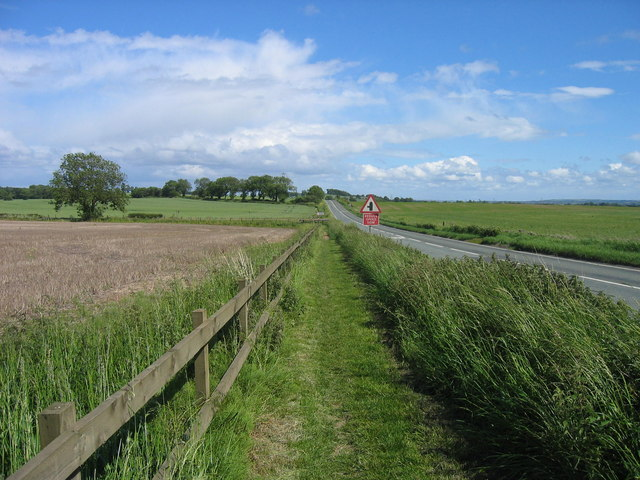
B6318, Near Harlow Hill

The Military Road is part of the B6318 road in Northumberland, England, which runs from Heddon-on-the-Wall in the east to Greenhead in the west.

For much of its length, the Military Road is straight and resembles a Roman road. However, the term "military road" comes from the impetus to build a road suitable for the movement of military equipment and vehicles between Newcastle and Carlisle. This was largely in response to the poor conditions encountered on the road by Hanoverian forces under Field Marshal Wade in 1745 when trying to suppress the Jacobites fighting for Bonnie Prince Charlie in the North. The struggle of the troops under Field Marshal Wade, and his association with other 'Military Roads' in Scotland, is likely to be the source of the claim that he was also responsible for this route.

The road runs alongside Hadrian's Wall for much of its length, and long stretches of it are built on the foundations of the wall.

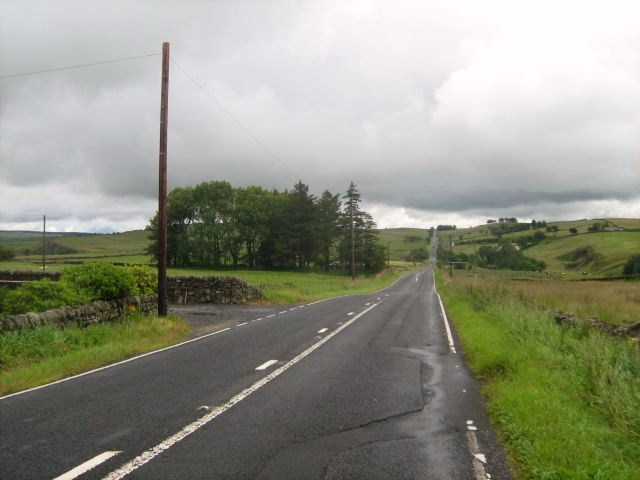
Near Once Brewed, westward

== History ==
The construction of the historical Military Road, on which the B6318 partially runs, is cited as one of the most damaging single attacks on Hadrian's Wall. The decision to improve road communications was taken in response to the difficulty moving the Hanoverian army under General George Wade from Newcastle to Carlisle in 1746; the journey reportedly took almost a week between 16 and 22 November. In light of the poor condition of the roads, an improved route was considered as a matter of urgency. Construction began in mid-1751, and was completed in 1758.

The topography west of Sewingshields made it necessary for the road to diverge from the wall, thus preserving much of what remains of the wall today.

== See also ==
- Stanegate
