= Chesters Bridge =

Roman bridge in Northumberland, England

- Northumberland, England, UK

Location
- Location in Northumberland
- Coordinates: 55.025°N 2.138°W
- Grid reference: NY913700

Chesters Bridge was a Roman bridge over the River North Tyne at Chollerford, Northumberland, England, and adjacent to the Roman fort of Cilurnum on Hadrian's Wall. The fort, mentioned in the Notitia Dignitatum, and now identified with the fort found at Chesters, was known as Cilurnum or Cilurvum.

In 2016, public access to Chesters Roman bridge abutments was suspended due to flood damage.

== History ==
Hadrian's Wall and Chesters bridge abutment

The remains of the bridge on the east bank of the River North Tyne are approached along a footpath from near Chollerford Bridge. These remains were first located in 1860. They form one of the most impressive and massive masonry structures to be seen on Hadrian's Wall. A shift in the course of the Tyne has moved the river westwards about 66 feet (20 m), completely covering or sweeping away much of the west abutment, leaving the eastern abutment high, if not always dry, on the other bank.

== Defence ==
The bridge carried the Military Way Roman road behind the wall across the River North Tyne at this point, and was defended by the adjacent cavalry fort at its foundation, later given over to infantry. An early inscription on an altar dedicated to Disciplina, found in 1978, indicates the earliest known military presence was a wing of cavalry, ala Augusta ob virtutem appellata ("named Augusta because of its valour").

== First bridge ==
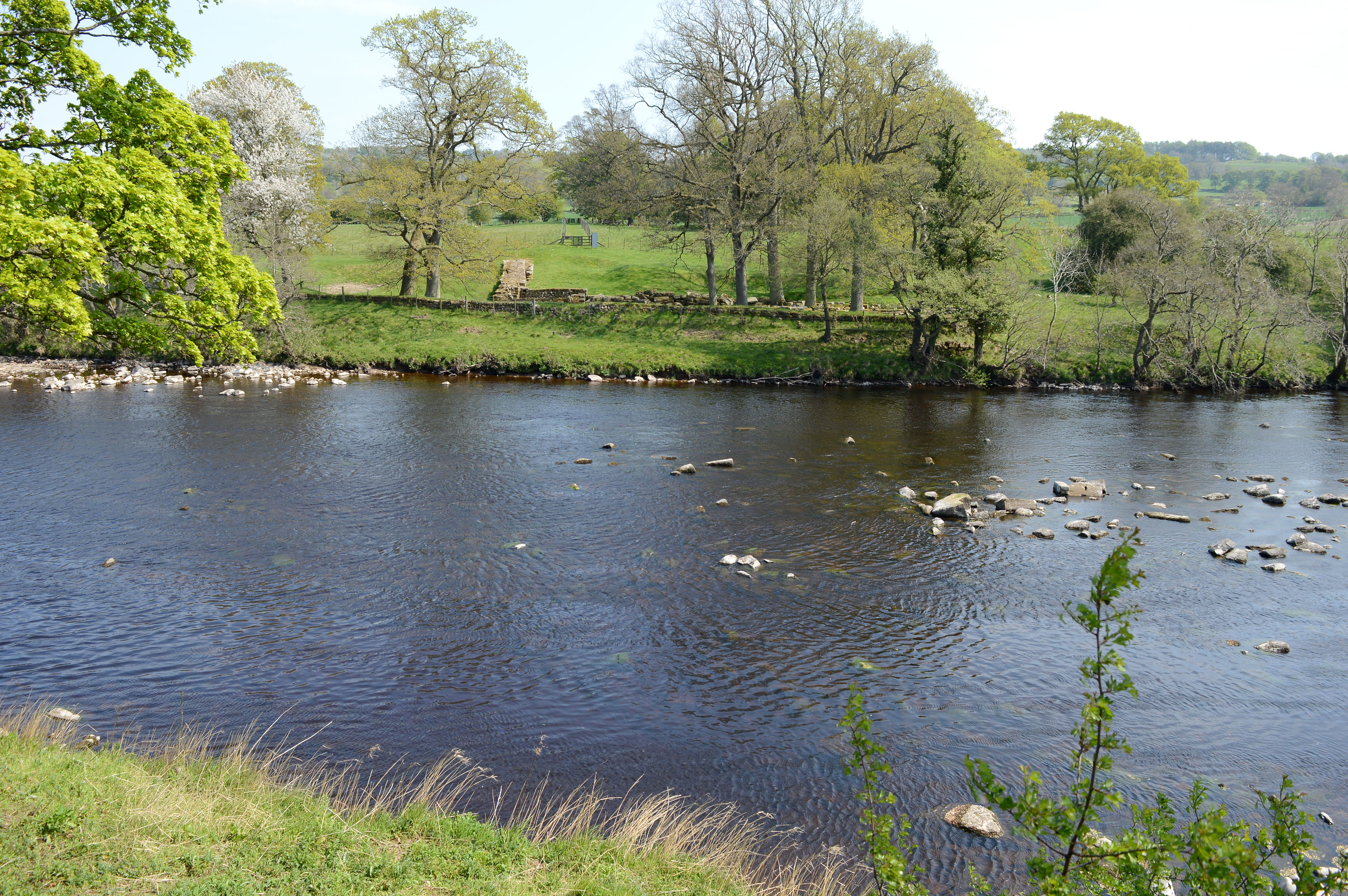
Chesters Bridge from the West bank of the Tyne

There were at least two bridges on this spot. The first, less massive than its successor, was probably contemporary with the construction of the Wall in AD 122–4. It crossed the river on a series of at least eight hexagonal stone piers about 13 feet (4 m) apart: the first of these (from the east) can be seen where it has been incorporated into the stonework of the later abutment. The overall length of the bridge between abutments was 200 feet (61 m). The width of these piers suggests that the bridge was intended to convey a structure 10 feet (3.0 m) wide – the width of the Broad Wall in this area – and that it therefore carried Hadrian's Wall across the river with a series of small stone arches. The masonry appears to have been plain but substantial, and the surviving hexagonal pier bears traces of dovetail cramps of iron set in lead which would have held the stones tightly together.

== Second bridge ==
The second bridge was much larger and the new eastern abutment was a far more lofty affair than before, with splayed wing walls both north and south of the bridge's actual line. This abutment, its massive rectangular stones lifted into place using the lewis holes which are a feature of their upper surface, were held together with long iron ties channelled into the masonry to reinforce the front face. The lewis-holes widen as they penetrate. The lewis consisted of a split wedge which, after being inserted in the hole, was widened out to lock into it by the insertion of a strip of metal between the two halves of the wedge. The hook of the crane was then passed through the head of the lewis and the stone was ready for lifting. From this solid abutment there sprang an elegant bridge with four arches supported on three substantial river piers, 34 feet (10.4 m) apart. Its overall length was 189 feet (57.6 m) and was intended to take a road carriageway. Few voussoirs (wedge-shaped stones from arches) have been found, but there is sufficient other evidence in the form of cornice blocks, grooved to take vertical parapet slabs, and angled mouldings, to show that the bridge was of stone, although others state that the second bridge had a timber superstructure. This second bridge seems to date from the early 3rd century [others give AD 162-5 or AD 206]. There is no evidence for any further repair or alteration to the bridge after that date. There is a male fertility symbol carved into the northern face of the eastern abutment.

== Reinterpretation of the site ==
In 2024, a major reinterpretation of the site was published. The bridge was again seen as of wood and the worn cornice stones, the only evidence ever of a stone bridge, were reassigned to the southern abutment, which was now seen as a wharf. Carts were loaded directly from barges at the wharf, which was the head of Roman navigation of the North Tyne. The site was seen as a major logistics base for supporting Roman invasions of Scotland.

== Excavation ==
The abutment

In the early 19th century Nathaniel Clayton, owner of Chesters House and Estate, moved hundreds of tons of earth to cover over the last remains of the fort as part of his parkland landscaping, thereby creating a smooth uninterrupted grassland slope down to the River Tyne; he collected, before they disappeared, a number of Roman artefacts which he preserved in the family. However his son John Clayton, a noted antiquarian, removed all his father's work, exposing the fort, excavating, and establishing a small museum for his finds. John Clayton also made excavations at Housesteads Fort, Carrawburgh Mithraic Temple, and Carvoran, amongst others.

In the 1980s the site was re-excavated, leading to wear on the surface of the cornice blocks being discovered. This led to the bridge being reinterpreted from having been a wooden to a stone bridge.

== See also ==
- Cilurnum
- Chollerford Bridge
- Low Brunton
- Petrosomatoglyph Male fertility symbol
- List of Roman bridges

Next bridge upstream	River North Tyne	Next bridge downstream
Chollerford Bridge (B6318 Military Road)	Chesters Bridge; Grid reference NY913700	Constantius Bridge (A69 road)
