= R. G. Collingwood =

British historian and philosopher (1889–1943)

R. G. Collingwood FBA
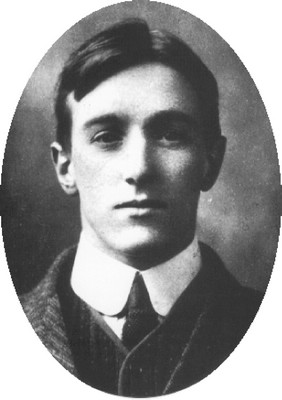
- Born: Robin George Collingwood; 22 February 1889; Gillhead, Cartmel Fell, Lancashire, England
- Died: 9 January 1943 (aged 53); Coniston, Lancashire, England

Education
- Education: University College, Oxford
- Academic advisor: John Cook Wilson

Philosophical work
- Era: 20th-century philosophy
- Region: Western philosophy
- School: British idealism Historism
- Institutions: Pembroke College, Oxford
- Main interests: Metaphysics; Philosophy of history Aesthetics
- Notable works: The Principles of Art (1938); The Idea of History (1946)
- Notable ideas: Historical imagination Coining the English term historicism Aesthetic expressivism

Robin George Collingwood (/ˈkɒlɪŋwʊd/; 22 February 1889 – 9 January 1943) was an English philosopher, historian and archaeologist. He is best known for his philosophical works, including The Principles of Art (1938) and the posthumously published The Idea of History (1946).

== Biography ==
Collingwood was born on 22 February 1889 in Cartmel, Grange-over-Sands, then in Lancashire (now Cumbria), the son of the artist and archaeologist W. G. Collingwood, who acted as John Ruskin's private secretary in the final years of Ruskin's life. Collingwood's mother was also an artist and a talented pianist. He was educated at Rugby School and University College, Oxford, where he gained a First in Classical Moderations (Greek and Latin) in 1910 and a congratulatory First in Greats (Ancient History and Philosophy) in 1912. Prior to graduation, he was elected a fellow of Pembroke College, Oxford.

During World War I, he served in admiralty intelligence in London from 1915 to 1918. In 1918, after returning to Oxford, he married Ethel Winifred Graham (1885–1973), a graduate of Somerville College, Oxford, with whom he had a son and a daughter. He later married Kathleen Frances Edwardes in 1942, with whom he had another daughter.

Collingwood was a fellow of Pembroke College, Oxford, for some 23 years until becoming the Waynflete Professor of Metaphysical Philosophy at Magdalen College, Oxford. He was taught by the historian and archaeologist F. J. Haverfield, at the time Camden Professor of Ancient History. Important influences on Collingwood were the Italian Idealists Benedetto Croce, Giovanni Gentile and Guido de Ruggiero, the last of whom was also a close friend. Other important influences were Hegel, Kant, Giambattista Vico, F. H. Bradley and J. A. Smith.

After several years of increasingly debilitating strokes, Collingwood died at Coniston, Lancashire, on 9 January 1943. He was a practising Anglican throughout his life.

== Philosopher ==
Collingwood defined philosophy as "thought of the second degree, thought about thought". An astronomer investigates phenomena and provides a theory from their observations, if the astronomer were to think about their process this would be philosophy.

=== Philosophy of history ===
Collingwood is widely noted for The Idea of History (1946), which was collated from various sources soon after his death by a student, T. M. Knox. It came to be a major inspiration for philosophy of history in the English-speaking world and is extensively cited, leading to an ironic remark by commentator Louis Mink that Collingwood is coming to be "the best known neglected thinker of our time". Collingwood is quoted multiple times in E. H. Carr's famous book What is History?.

Collingwood categorized history as a science, defining a science as "any organized body of knowledge." However, he distinguished history from natural sciences because the concerns of these two branches are different: natural sciences are concerned with the physical world, while history, in its most common usage, is concerned with social sciences and human affairs. Collingwood pointed out a fundamental difference between knowing things in the present (or in the natural sciences) and knowing history. To come to know things in the present or about things in the natural sciences, "real" things can be observed, as they are in existence or that have substance right now.

Since the internal thought processes of historical persons cannot be perceived with the physical senses and past historical events cannot be directly observed, history must be methodologically different from natural sciences. History, being a study of the human mind, is interested in the thoughts and motivations of the actors in history, this insight being encapsulated in his epigram "All history is the history of thought." Therefore, Collingwood suggested that a historian must "reconstruct" history by using "historical imagination" to "re-enact" the thought processes of historical persons based on information and evidence from historical sources. Re-enactment of thought refers to the idea that the historian can access not only a thought process similar to that of the historical actor, but the actual thought process itself. Consider Collingwood's words regarding the study of Plato:

In its immediacy, as an actual experience of his own, Plato's argument must undoubtedly have grown up out of a discussion of some sort, though I do not know what it was, and been closely connected with such a discussion. Yet if I not only read his argument but understand it, follow it in my own mind by re-arguing it with and for myself, the process of argument which I go through is not a process resembling Plato's, it actually is Plato's, so far as I understand him rightly.

In Collingwood's understanding, a thought is a single entity accessible to the public and, therefore, regardless of how many people have the same thought, it is still a singular thought. "Thoughts, in other words, are to be distinguished based on purely qualitative criteria, and if two people are entertaining the (qualitatively) same thought, there is (numerically) only one thought since there is only one propositional content." Therefore, if historians follow the correct line of inquiry in response to a historical source and reason correctly, they can arrive at the same thought the author of their source had and, in so doing, "re-enact" that thought.

Collingwood rejected what he deemed "scissors-and-paste history," in which the historian rejects a statement recorded by their subject either because it contradicts another historical statement or because it contradicts the historian's own understanding of the world. As he states in Principles of History, sometimes a historian will encounter "a story which he simply cannot believe, a story characteristic, perhaps, of the superstitions or prejudices of the author's time or the circle in which he lived, but not credible to a more enlightened age, and therefore to be omitted." This, Collingwood argues, is an unacceptable way to do history. Sources that make claims that do not align with current understandings of the world were still created by rational humans who had reason for creating them. Therefore, these sources are valuable and ought to be investigated further to get at the historical context in which they were created and for what reason.

=== Philosophy of art ===
The Principles of Art (1938) comprises Collingwood's most developed treatment of aesthetic questions. Collingwood held (following Benedetto Croce) that works of art are essentially expressions of emotion. For Collingwood, an important social role for artists is to clarify and articulate emotions from their community.

Collingwood considered 'magic' to be a form of art, as opposed to superstition or 'bad science'. Magic for Collingwood is a practical exercise to bring about a certain emotional state. For example magic like a war dance before a battle is a ritual whereby the warriors work themselves up into a particular emotive state in order to do battle. In giving such a conception Collingwood hoped to address the issue of the word 'magic' having "no definite significance at all", he intended to ameliorate this by making it a term "with a definite meaning". He accuses anthropologists of prejudice when analyzing the magical practices of previous generations, as they assumed that it must fulfill the same purpose of modern science.

Collingwood developed a position later known as aesthetic expressivism (not to be confused with various other views typically called expressivism), a thesis first developed by Croce.

=== Political philosophy ===
In politics Collingwood defended the ideals of what he called liberalism "in its Continental sense":

The essence of this conception is ... the idea of a community as governing itself by fostering the free expression of all political opinions that take shape within it, and finding some means of reducing this multiplicity of opinions to a unity.

In his Autobiography, Collingwood confessed that his politics had always been "democratic" and "liberal", and shared Guido de Ruggiero's opinion that socialism had rendered a great service to liberalism by pointing out the shortcomings of laissez-faire economics.

== Archaeologist ==
Collingwood was not just a philosopher of history but also a practising historian and archaeologist. He was, during his time, a leading authority on Roman Britain: he spent his term time at Oxford teaching philosophy but devoted his long vacations to archaeology.

The family home was at Coniston in the Lake District and his father was a leading figure in the Cumberland and Westmorland Archaeological Society. Collingwood was drawn in on a number of excavations in the area. He was interested in Hadrian's Wall, and suggested that it was not so much a fighting platform but an elevated sentry walk. He also put forward the suggestion that Hadrian's defensive system included a number of forts along the Cumberland coast: this interpretation is still regarded as valid in the case of for example Alauna (Maryport).

He was very active in the 1930 Wall Pilgrimage for which he prepared the ninth edition of Bruce's Handbook.

His final and most controversial excavation in Cumbria was that of a circular ring ditch near Penrith known as King Arthur's Round Table in 1937. It appeared to be a Neolithic henge monument, and Collingwood's excavations, failing to find conclusive evidence of Neolithic activity, nevertheless found the base of two stone pillars, a possible cremation trench and some post holes. Sadly, his subsequent ill health prevented him from undertaking a second season so the work was handed over to the German prehistorian Gerhard Bersu, who queried some of Collingwood's findings. However, recently, Grace Simpson, the daughter of the excavator F. G. Simpson, has queried Bersu's work and largely rehabilitated Collingwood as an excavator.

He also began what was to be the major work of his archaeological career, preparing a corpus of the Roman Inscriptions of Britain, which involved travelling all over Britain to see the inscriptions and draw them; he eventually prepared drawings of nearly 900 inscriptions. It was finally published in 1965 by his student R. P. Wright.

He also published two major archaeological works. The first was The Archaeology of Roman Britain, a handbook in sixteen chapters covering first the archaeological sites (fortresses, towns and temples and portable antiquities), inscriptions, coins, pottery and brooches. Mortimer Wheeler, in a review remarked that "it seemed at first a trifle off beat that he should immerse himself in so much museum-like detail ... but I felt sure that this was incidental to his primary mission to organise his own thinking".

However, his most important work was his contribution to the first volume of the Oxford History of England, Roman Britain and the English Settlements, of which he wrote the major part, Nowell Myres adding the smaller second part on English settlements. The book was in many ways revolutionary, for it set out to write the story of Roman Britain from an archaeological rather than a historical viewpoint, putting into practice his own belief in 'Question and Answer' archaeology.

The result was alluring and influential. However, as Ian Richmond wrote, 'The general reader may discover too late that it has one major defect. It does not sufficiently distinguish between objective and subjective and combines both in a subtle and apparently objective presentation.

The most notorious passage is that on Romano-British art: "the impression that constantly haunts the archaeologist, like a bad smell, is that of an ugliness that plagues the place like a London fog".

Collingwood's most important contribution to British archaeology was his insistence on question-and-answer archaeology: excavations should not take place unless there is a question to be answered. It is a philosophy which, as Anthony Birley points out, has been incorporated by English Heritage into the conditions for Scheduled Monuments Consent. Still, it has always been surprising that the proponents of the "new" archaeology in the 1960s and the 70s have entirely ignored the work of Collingwood, the one major archaeologist who was also a major professional philosopher. He has been described as an early proponent of archaeological theory.

== Author ==
Outside archaeology and philosophy, he also published the travel book The First Mate's Log of a Voyage to Greece (1940), an account of a yachting voyage in the Mediterranean, in the company of several of his students.

Arthur Ransome was a family friend, and learned to sail in their boat, subsequently teaching his sibling's children to sail. Ransome loosely based the Swallows in Swallows and Amazons series on his sibling's children.

== Works ==
=== Main works published in his lifetime ===
- Religion and Philosophy (1916) ISBN 1-85506-317-4
- Roman Britain (1923; 2nd ed., 1932) ISBN 0-8196-1160-3
- Speculum Mentis; or The Map of Knowledge (1924) ISBN 978-1-897406-42-7
- Outlines of a Philosophy of Art (1925)
- The Archaeology of Roman Britain (1930) ISBN 978-0-09-185045-6
- An Essay on Philosophical Method (1933, rev. ed. 2005). ISBN 1-85506-392-1
- Roman Britain and the English Settlements (with J. N. L. Myres, 1936, 2nd ed. 1937)
- The Principles of Art (1938) ISBN 0-19-500209-1
- An Autobiography (1939) ISBN 0-19-824694-3
- The First Mate's Log (1940)
- An Essay on Metaphysics (1940, revised edition 1998). ISBN 0-8191-3315-9
- The New Leviathan (1942, rev. ed. 1992) ISBN 0-19-823880-0

=== Main articles published in his lifetime ===
- 'A Philosophy of Progress', The Realist, 1:1, April 1929, 64-77

=== Published posthumously ===
- The Idea of Nature (1945) ISBN 0-19-500217-2
- The Idea of History (1946, revised edition 1993). ISBN 0-19-285306-6
- Essays in the Philosophy of Art (1964)
- Essays in the Philosophy of History (1965) ISBN 0-8240-6355-4
- Essays in Political Philosophy (with David Boucher) (1989) ISBN 0-19-823566-6
- The Principles of History and Other Writings in Philosophy of History (ed. William H. Dray and W. J. van der Dussen) (2001) ISBN 0-19-924315-8
- The Philosophy of Enchantment: Studies in Folktale, Cultural Criticism, and Anthropology (2005) ISBN 0-19-926253-5

All 'revised' editions comprise the original text plus a new introduction and extensive additional material.

== Sources ==
- William M. Johnston, The Formative Years of R. G. Collingwood (Harvard University Archives, 1965)
- Jan van der Dussen: History as a Science: The Philosophy of R. G. Collingwood. Springer, 2012. ISBN 978-94-007-4311-3 [Print]; ISBN 978-94-007-4312-0 [eBook]
- David Boucher. The Social and Political Thought of R. G. Collingwood. Cambridge University Press. 1989. 300pp.
- Alan Donagan. The Later Philosophy of R. G. Collingwood. University of Chicago Press. 1986.
- William H. Dray. History as Re-enactment: R. G. Collingwood's Idea of History. Oxford University Press. 1995. 347pp.
