= Chesters, Humshaugh =

Country mansion in Northumberland, England

Coordinates: 55.027°N 2.145°W

Chesters is an 18th-century country mansion adjacent to Hadrian's Wall and the Roman fort of Cilurnum at Humshaugh, Northumberland, England. It is a Grade II* listed building.

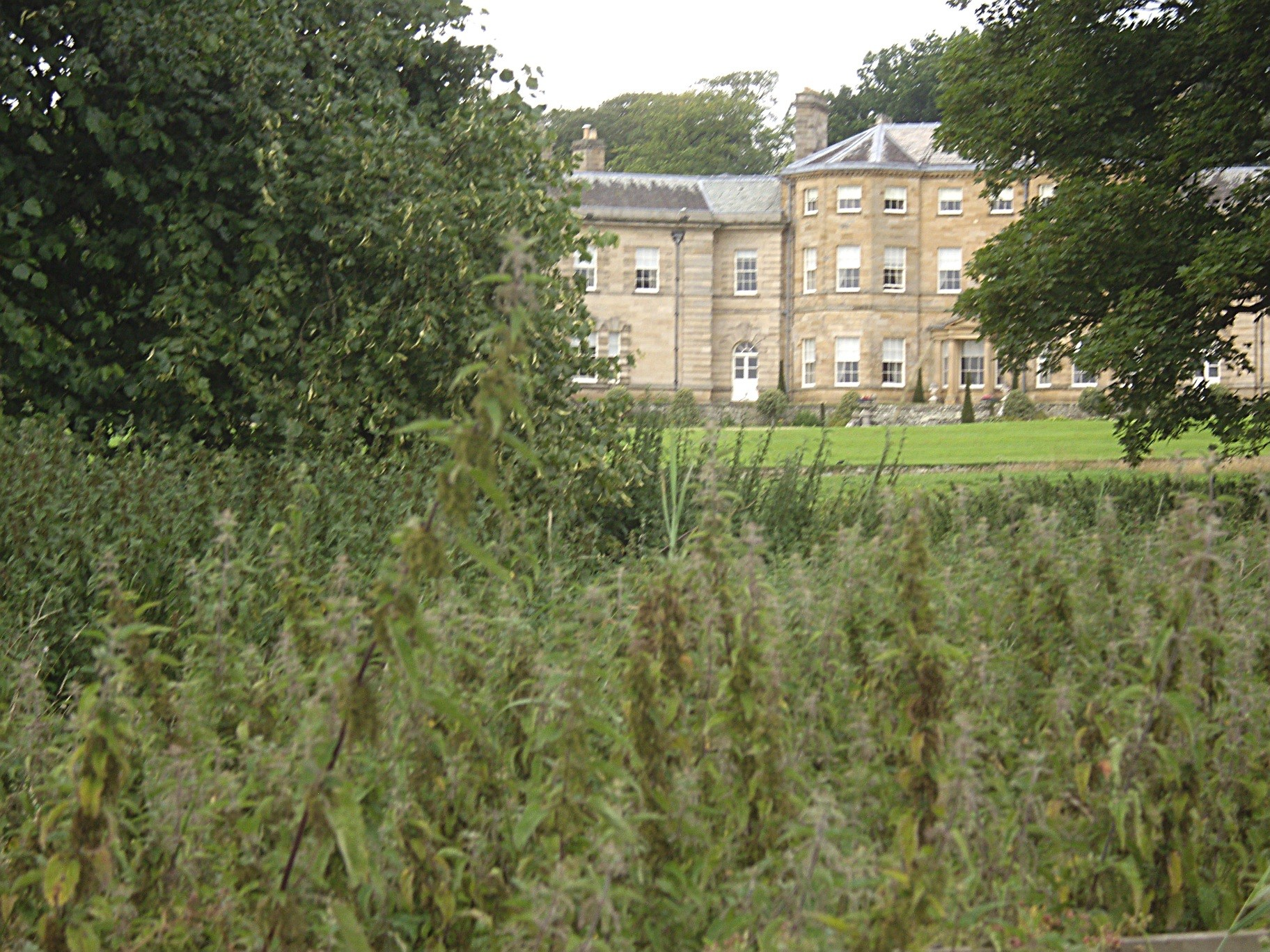
Chesters

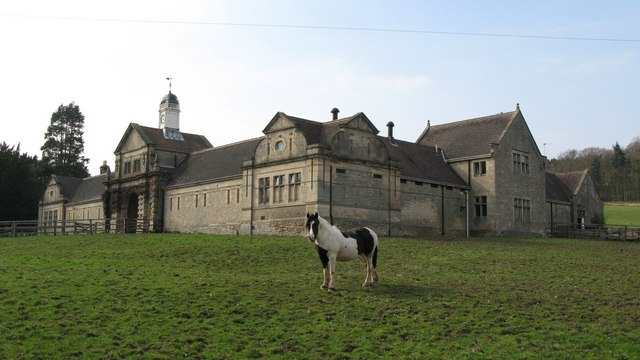
Stable block, across the road (B6318) from the house

== History ==
The house was built for John Errington of Walwick Grange in about 1771 with three storeys and four bays but was much improved and extended by architect Norman Shaw in 1891. The 1891 work included five two-storeyed three-bay wings and a stable block. The stable block is separately Grade II* listed.

Of the five wings, three were diagonal, creating suntrap flanks for the south and west fronts. Shaw's remodelling of Chesters kindled the popularity of the butterfly plan in the late 19th and early 20th centuries.

The estate was acquired by Nathaniel Clayton (Town Clerk of Newcastle upon Tyne 1785–1822) in 1796. His son John Clayton, who succeeded him as Town Clerk in 1822, was a keen antiquarian and excavated the ruins of the Roman fort of Cilurnam adjacent to the house. He made a large collection of Roman artefacts, which is now displayed at Chesters Museum. John's collection contained artefacts inherited via his sister Jane from their maternal grandmother, collector Bridget Atkinson, who is thought to have influenced his development as an antiquarian collector.
