= Chollerton =

Village in Northumberland, England

Coordinates: 55.046°N 2.103°W

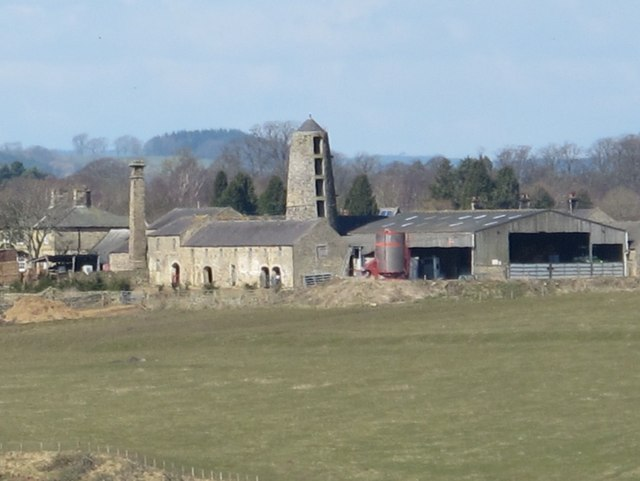
- Chollerton Farm

- Location within Northumberland
- Population: 818 (2011)
- OS grid reference: NY935725
- Civil parish: Chollerton
- Unitary authority: Northumberland
- Ceremonial county: Northumberland
- Region: North East
- Country: England
- Sovereign state: United Kingdom
- Post town: HEXHAM
- Postcode district: NE46
- Dialling code: 01434
- Police: Northumbria
- Fire: Northumberland
- Ambulance: North East
- UK Parliament: Hexham

Chollerton is a small village and large civil parish in Northumberland, England, on the A6079 road about six miles (10 km) to the north of Hexham, on the River North Tyne. Nearby villages include Low Brunton and Humshaugh. The village has a fine example of a mounting block standing at the churchyard gate.

The church, built around the 12th century from local stone quarried from nearby, is dedicated to Saint Giles, and is noteworthy for the four large Roman columns built into its south aisle. These are believed to have been brought from the Roman fort of Chesters a couple of miles downstream. St Christopher's Church, Gunnerton, designed by John Cyril Hawes in 1899, is a chapel of ease in the parish; the building has been restored and now has a stained glass window by William Tillyer in the west wall.

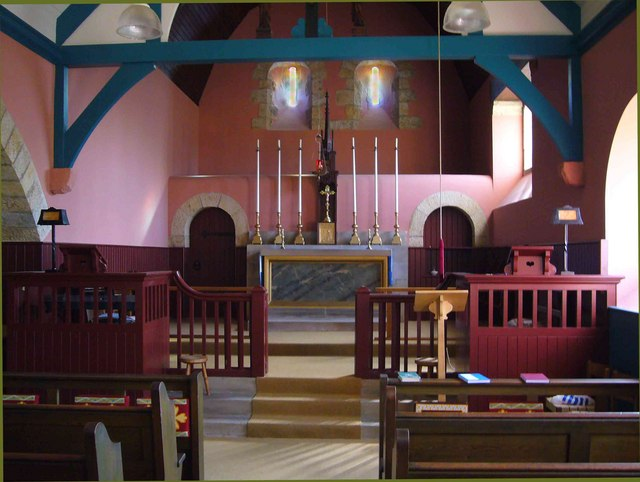
Interior of St Christopher's Church, Gunnerton

Chollerton is also a registration sub-district in Northumberland; its population in 1851 was 5024 people.

The etymology of the name Chollerton is uncertain; possibly it is from the Old English "Ceolferth's tun" but more likely it meant "tun by Ceolan ford or Ceolford", if so "Ceolford" meant "Ceola's ford" (i.e. modern Chollerford).

== Governance ==
Chollerton is in the parliamentary constituency of Hexham.

== Transport ==
Chollerton was served by Chollerton railway station on the Border Counties Railway which linked the Newcastle and Carlisle Railway, near Hexham, with the Border Union Railway at Riccarton Junction in Scotland. The first section of the route was opened between Hexham and Chollerford in 1858, the remainder opening in 1862. The line was closed to passengers by British Railways in 1956.

The station still stands and is now in use as a private house. Also still standing is a small viaduct over the road into the village.

== Landmarks ==
A mile to the south-east, Cocklaw Tower is a ruined late 14th or early 15th-century tower house.

== See also ==
- Hadrian's Wall
- Low Brunton
