= Wall, Northumberland =

Village in Northumberland, England

Coordinates: 55.015°N 2.132°W

Wall
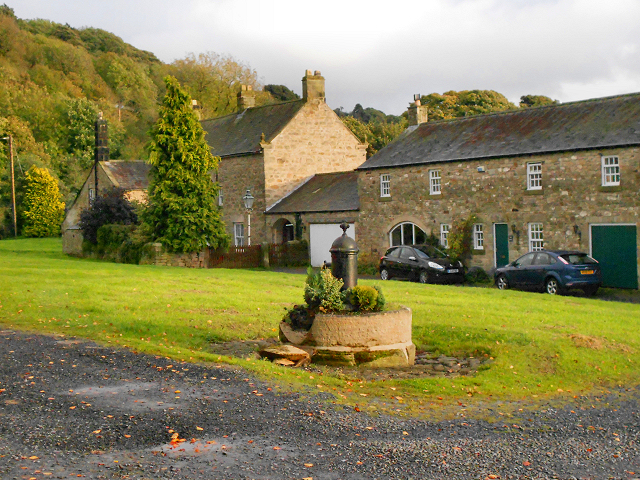
- Village Green

- Location within Northumberland
- Population: 458 (2011)
- OS grid reference: NY916689
- Unitary authority: Northumberland
- Ceremonial county: Northumberland
- Region: North East
- Country: England
- Sovereign state: United Kingdom
- Post town: HEXHAM
- Postcode district: NE46
- Dialling code: 01434
- Police: Northumbria
- Fire: Northumberland
- Ambulance: North East
- UK Parliament: Hexham

Wall is a village in Northumberland, England situated to the north of Hexham close by the River North Tyne and Hadrian's Wall. The Battle of Heavenfield was fought nearby. The village has one pub and a garage.

== Governance ==
Wall is in the parliamentary constituency of Hexham.

== Transport ==
Wall was served by Wall railway station on the Border Counties Railway which linked the Newcastle and Carlisle Railway, near Hexham, with the Border Union Railway at Riccarton Junction. The first section of the route was opened between Hexham and Chollerford in 1858, the remainder opening in 1862. The line was closed to passengers by British Railways in 1956.

The station, and signal box, still stands and is now in use as a private house.
