= Humshaugh =

Village in Northumberland, England

Coordinates: 55.0333°N 2.1333°W

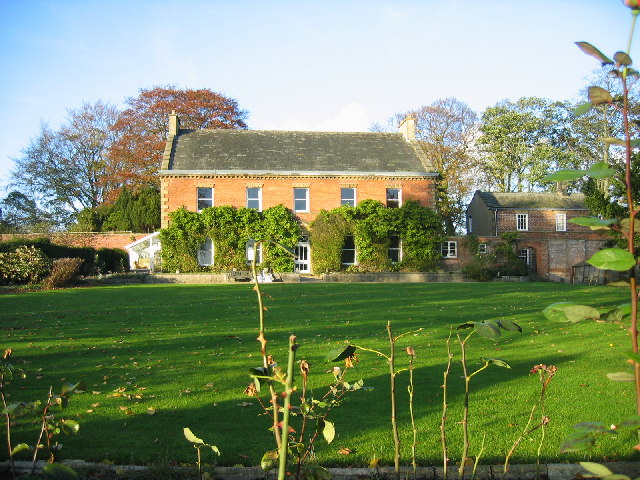
- Humshaugh House

- Location within Northumberland
- Population: 622 (2011)
- OS grid reference: NY919712
- Unitary authority: Northumberland
- Ceremonial county: Northumberland
- Region: North East
- Country: England
- Sovereign state: United Kingdom
- Post town: Hexham
- Postcode district: NE46
- Dialling code: 01434
- Police: Northumbria
- Fire: Northumberland
- Ambulance: North East
- UK Parliament: Hexham

Humshaugh (/ˈhʌmzhʌf/) is a parish near Hexham in Northumberland, England. The village had a population of 622 in the 2011 census, and is just north of Chollerford, which is located near Chesters Fort (Cilurnum) on Hadrian's Wall and is about 21 miles west of Newcastle upon Tyne. The village of Humshaugh lies just off the military road running from Newcastle to Carlisle which was built by General Wade during the 1745 Jacobite rebellion. Other nearby villages include Low Brunton and Walwick. Humshaugh is usually pronounced Humz-hoff, although some genuine locals have been heard calling it Humz-haff.

The paper mill near Humshaugh, on the River North Tyne close to Barrasford, among other mills in various rural locations around England, was used during the Napoleonic Wars to make the paper that was used to print fake French money in a bid to flood France with the forged notes, which was intended to cause a marked devaluation of the currency.

It is also attributed as the site of the first official Scout camp in August 1908, a year after the more famous experimental camp on Brownsea Island.

== Toponymy ==
The name is recorded in 1279 as "Hounshale" and seems to come from Anglo-Saxon Hūnes halh = "Hūn's nook of land".

== Scouting ==
First official Scout camp

While Brownsea Island was the site of the experimental camp run by Baden-Powell in 1907, Humshaugh hosted what is recognised as the first official Scout camp from 22 August to 4 September 1908. The difference between the two camps is that the 1907 event was not attended by any invested members of Scouting, since there was no movement at the time. The Humshaugh camp had 30 invested Boy Scouts from around the United Kingdom who were members of recognised Scout Troops who followed the Scout Method and Scout Law as developed by Baden-Powell and published in his Scouting for Boys.

Humshaugh was a large parish, before sub division, and the Scouts took the train to Chollerford, the nearest station to Humshaugh, and walked up through Walwick and the woods to the site, which is known as Look Wide! The site is on land belonging to Park Shields Farm (grid reference NY 885 697), near to Fourstones, and is now marked by a cairn commemorating the event.

== Governance ==
An electoral ward in the same name exists. This ward stretches north almost to Bellingham and south almost to Acomb with a total population taken at the 2011 census of 4,568.

== Education ==
It is in the catchment area for Queen Elizabeth High School, Hexham.

== Famous residents ==
Eric Boswell, composer of the Christmas song "Little Donkey" and many other popular and folk songs, lived in Humshaugh from 1985 to 2009 and often played organ for services at St Peter's Church.

Kevin Whately, actor famous for playing Lewis, grew up in Humshaugh.
