= Walwick =

Village in Northumberland, England

Coordinates: 55.029°N 2.150°W

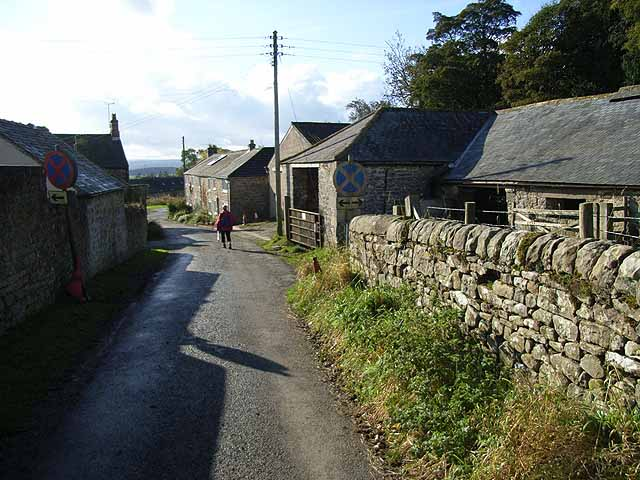

- Location within Northumberland
- OS grid reference: NY905705
- Civil parish: Humshaugh
- Unitary authority: Northumberland
- Ceremonial county: Northumberland
- Region: North East
- Country: England
- Sovereign state: United Kingdom
- Post town: HEXHAM
- Postcode district: NE46
- Police: Northumbria
- Fire: Northumberland
- Ambulance: North East
- UK Parliament: Hexham

Walwick is a hamlet in the parish of Humshaugh, Northumberland, England near Hadrian's Wall. Nearby villages include Chollerford and Low Brunton. Chesters Roman Fort is also a nearby attraction.

== History ==
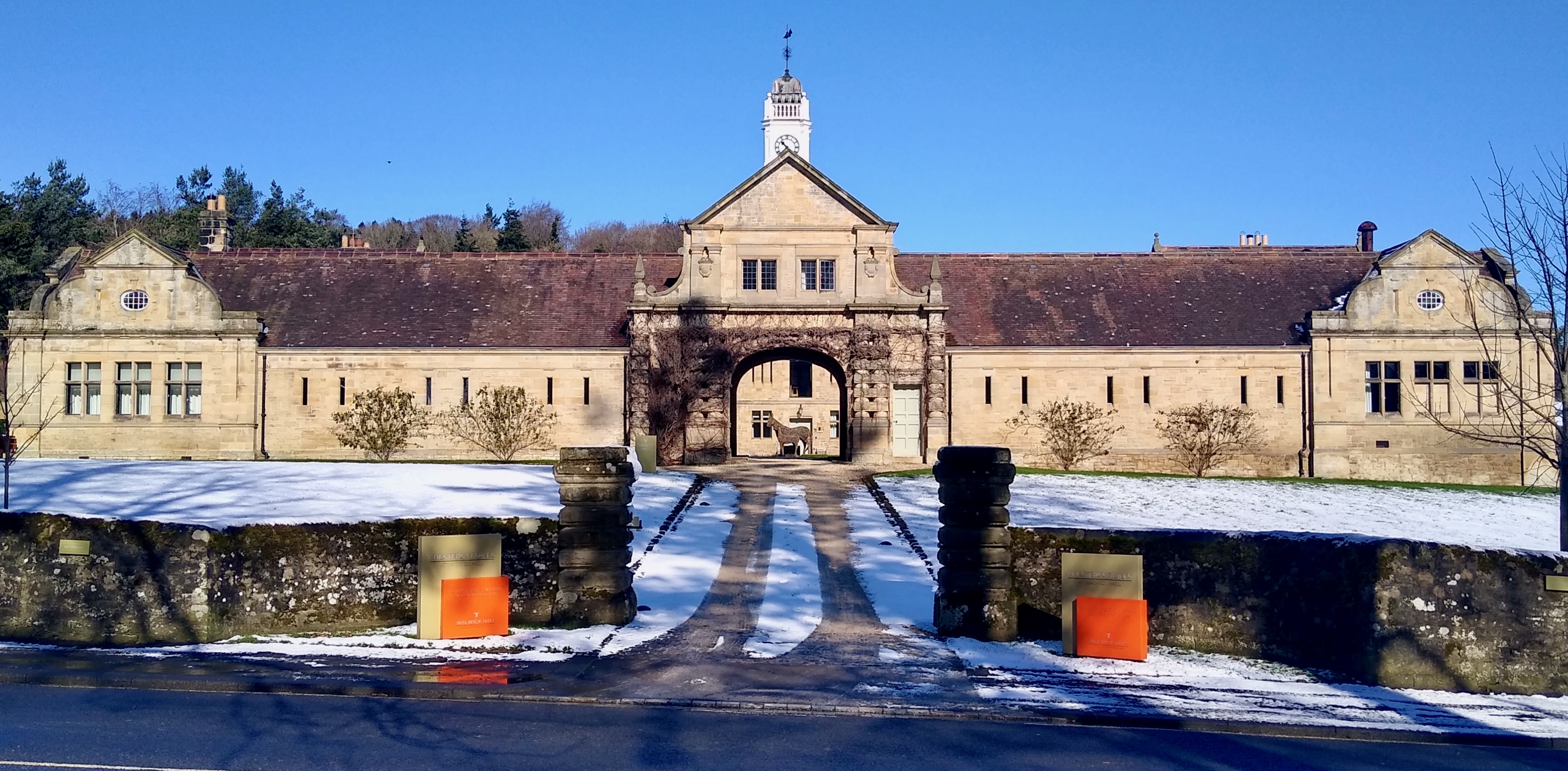
Chesters Stables at Walwick Hall

In 1789, it was reported there were "remains of a "considerable castle at Wallwick" or a tower house. A 1956 investigation of the site failed to uncover these reported ruins; it was speculated the ruins might have been of a Roman fort.

== Governance ==
Walwick is in the parliamentary constituency of Hexham.
