= Barrasford railway station =

Disused railway station in Barrasford, Northumberland

Barrasford
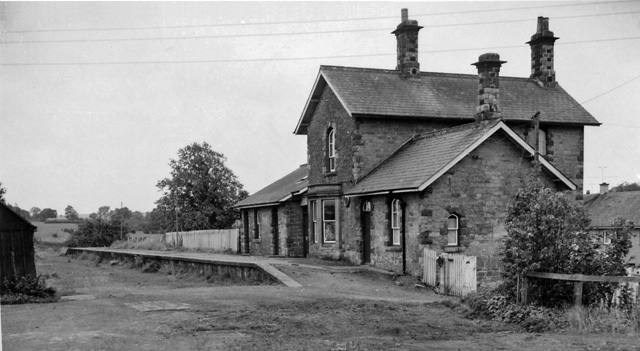
- The site of the station in 1962

General information
- Location: Barrasford, Northumberland; England
- Coordinates: 55.0569°N 2.1283°W
- Grid reference: NY919736
- Platforms: 1

Other information
- Status: Disused

History
- Original company: North British Railway
- Pre-grouping: North British Railway
- Post-grouping: London and North Eastern Railway; British Railways (North Eastern)

Key dates
- 1 December 1859: Opened
- 15 October 1956: Closed to passengers
- 1 September 1958: Closed completely
Location

Barrasford railway station served the village of Barrasford, Northumberland, England from 1859 to 1958 on the Border Counties Railway.

== History ==
The station opened on 1 December 1859 by the North British Railway. The station was situated on a lane to Catheugh 200 yards northeast of the centre of Barrasford village. A siding adjoined the line opposite the platform and there was a further loop to the northwest. Both of these were controlled by a signal box, which was at the northwest end of the platform.

The station was host to a camping coach from 1936 to 1939.

The station was closed to passengers on 15 October 1956 but remained open for goods traffic until 1 September 1958, although it was downgraded towards an unstaffed public siding.

Preceding station	Disused railways	Following station
Wark; Line and station closed	North British Railway; Border Counties Railway	Chollerton; Line and station closed

== Bibliography ==
- Hurst, Geoffrey (1992). Register of Closed Railways: 1948-1991. Worksop, Nottinghamshire: Milepost Publications. ISBN 0-9477-9618-5.
- McRae, Andrew (1997). British Railway Camping Coach Holidays: The 1930s & British Railways (London Midland Region). Vol. Scenes from the Past: 30 (Part One). Foxline. ISBN 1-870119-48-7.
- Quick, Michael (2022) [2001]. Railway passenger stations in Great Britain: a chronology (PDF). version 5.04. Railway & Canal Historical Society. Archived from the original (PDF) on 25 November 2022.
