= Wark on Tyne =

Village in Northumberland, England

Coordinates: 55.0917°N 2.2130°W

Wark
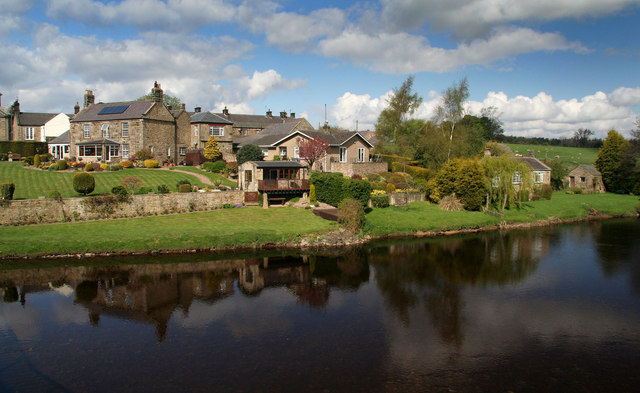
- Housing on the banks of the River North Tyne at Wark

- Location within Northumberland
- Population: 741 (2011)
- OS grid reference: NY865775
- Unitary authority: Northumberland
- Ceremonial county: Northumberland
- Region: North East
- Country: England
- Sovereign state: United Kingdom
- Post town: HEXHAM
- Postcode district: NE48
- Dialling code: 01434
- Police: Northumbria
- Fire: Northumberland
- Ambulance: North East
- UK Parliament: Hexham

Wark on Tyne or Wark is a village and civil parish in Northumberland, England, 12 miles (19 km) north of Hexham.

== History ==
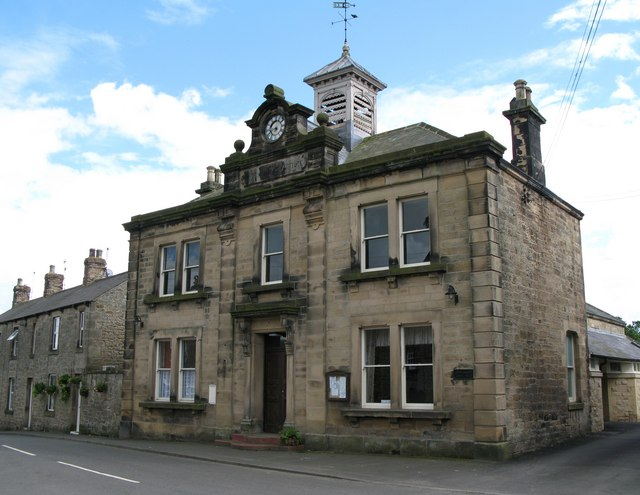
Wark Town Hall

The name is derived from the Anglo-Saxon word for earthworks, and refers to the mound at the south of the village. Wark was once the capital town of Tynedale. A Bronze Age stone circle known as The Goatstones is near Ravensheugh crags in the parish. Wark Town Hall is a Grade II listed building which was completed in 1874.

== Governance ==
Wark is in the parliamentary constituency of Hexham. Joe Morris of the Labour Party is the Member of Parliament.

Prior to Brexit, for the European Parliament its residents voted to elect MEPs for the North East England constituency.

For local government purposes, the parish is within the area of Northumberland County Council, a unitary authority.

== Transport ==
Wark was served by Wark station on the Border Counties Railway which linked the Newcastle & Carlisle Railway, near Hexham, with the Border Union Railway at Riccarton Junction in Scotland. The first section of the route was opened between Hexham and Chollerford in 1858, the remainder opening in 1862. The line was closed to passengers by British Railways in 1956. Part of the line is now beneath the surface of the Kielder Water reservoir. Wark Bridge crosses the River North Tyne.
