= Colwell, Northumberland =

Hamlet in Northumberland, England

Coordinates: 55.074°N 2.072°W

Colwell
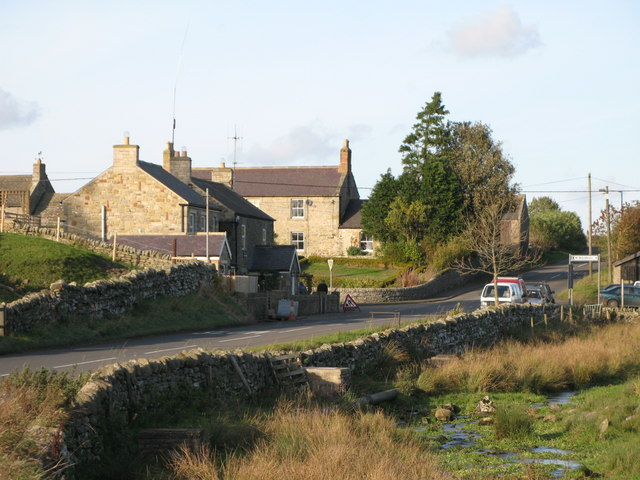
- Colwell (east)

- Location within Northumberland
- OS grid reference: NY955755
- Civil parish: Chollerton
- Unitary authority: Northumberland
- Ceremonial county: Northumberland
- Region: North East
- Country: England
- Sovereign state: United Kingdom
- Post town: HEXHAM
- Postcode district: NE46
- Police: Northumbria
- Fire: Northumberland
- Ambulance: North East
- UK Parliament: Hexham

Colwell is a hamlet in the civil parish of Chollerton, in Northumberland, England. It is about 12 miles (19 km) to the north of Hexham.

== History ==
There is archaeological evidence of Iron Age inhabitance on the Blue Crag. The sight contained three wells. There was a chapel in the northern area of the hamlet that fell into disrepair by 1770.

Colwell was historically merged with the deserted medieval village Great Swinburn (or Swinburne). In 1848, Colwell and Great Swinburn were recorded as a joint township in Chollerton civil parish, with a combined population of 393.

== Governance ==
Colwell is in the parliamentary constituency of Hexham.
