= Wark Bridge =

Bridge in Northumberland, England

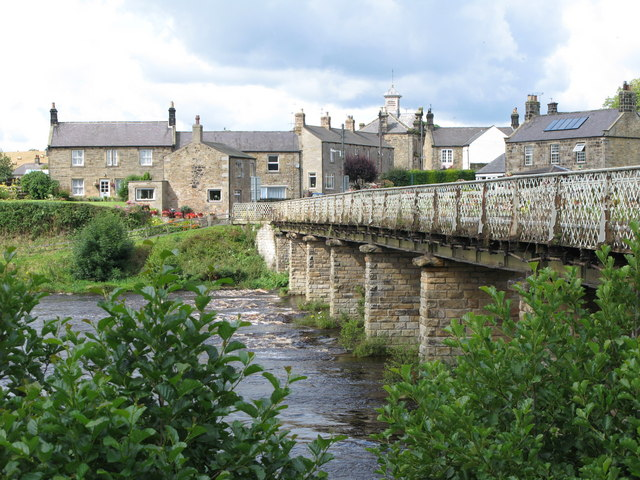
- Wark Bridge
- Coordinates: 55.0875°N 2.2169°W
- OS grid reference: NY862771
- Carries: Motor vehicles; Cycles; Pedestrians
- Crosses: River North Tyne
- Locale: Northumberland
- Owner: Northumberland County Council

Characteristics
- Design: Beam bridge
- Material: Iron
- Pier construction: Stone
- No. of spans: 8
- Piers in water: 7
- Load limit: 3 t
- No. of lanes: Single-track road

History
- Constructed by: Hawks, Crawshay and Sons
- Construction end: 1878
- Opened: 1878
- Rebuilt: 2010–2015

Wark Bridge is an iron bridge over the River North Tyne at Wark on Tyne in Northumberland, England.

== History ==
The bridge, which replaced a bridge of timber construction, was built by Hawks, Crawshay and Sons of Gateshead and opened in 1878. It underwent a major refurbishment in stages between 2010 and 2015.

Next bridge upstream	River North Tyne	Next bridge downstream
Bellingham Bridge; B6320 road	Wark Bridge; Grid reference NY862771	Chollerford Bridge; B6318 road
