= Low Brunton =

Village in Northumberland, England

Coordinates: 55.027°N 2.127°W

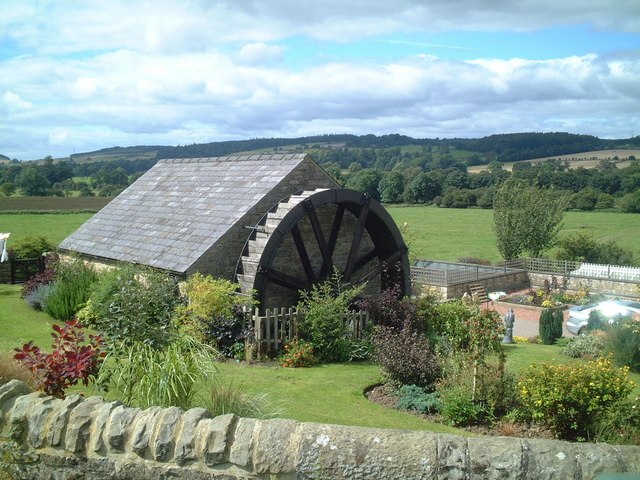
- Waterwheel at Low Brunton

- Location within Northumberland
- OS grid reference: NY919702
- Unitary authority: Northumberland
- Ceremonial county: Northumberland
- Region: North East
- Country: England
- Sovereign state: United Kingdom
- Post town: HEXHAM
- Postcode district: NE46
- Police: Northumbria
- Fire: Northumberland
- Ambulance: North East
- UK Parliament: Hexham

Low Brunton is a small village in Northumberland, England. Nearby settlements include Humshaugh, Chollerford and Walwick.

== Early history ==
Hadrian's Wall runs just south of Low Brunton, with the remains of Brunton Turret (26b), just over 26 Roman Miles from the eastern end of the Wall at Wallsend, Newcastle upon Tyne. The turret (stone tower) is noted because its construction displays the difference between the original plan to build the wall ten feet thick, and the revised scheme at a reduced eight feet.

== Governance ==
Low Brunton is in the parliamentary constituency of Hexham.

== See also ==
- Chollerford Bridge
