= Chollerton railway station =

Disused railway station in Chollerton, Northumberland

Chollerton
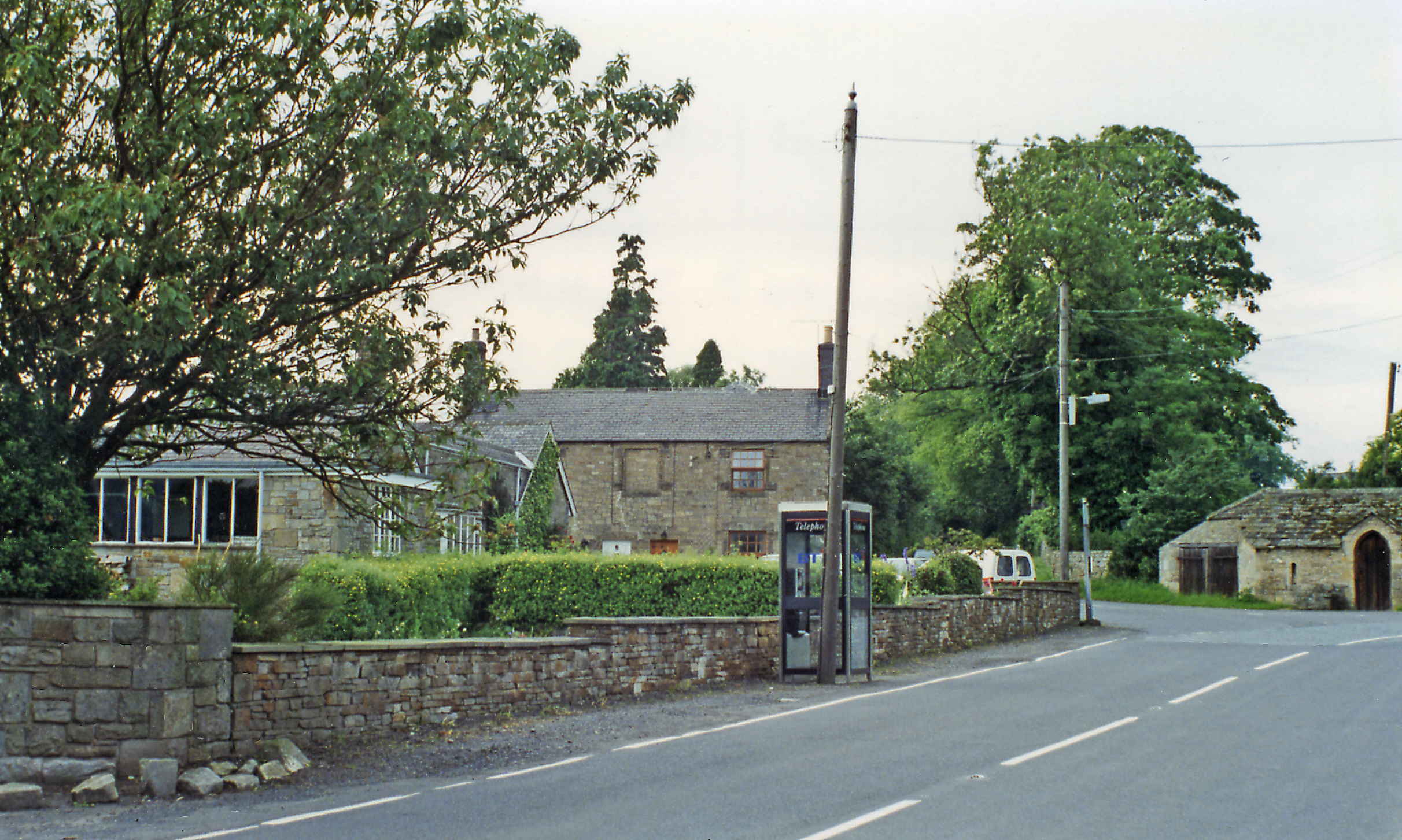
- The site of the station in 1997

General information
- Location: Chollerton, Northumberland; England
- Coordinates: 55.0416°N 2.1105°W
- Grid reference: NY930719
- Platforms: 1

Other information
- Status: Disused

History
- Original company: North British Railway
- Pre-grouping: North British Railway
- Post-grouping: London and North Eastern Railway; British Railways (North Eastern)

Key dates
- 1 December 1859: Opened
- 15 October 1956: Closed to passengers
- 1 September 1958: Closed completely
Location

Chollerton railway station served the village of Chollerton, Northumberland, England from 1859 to 1958 on the Border Counties Railway.

== History ==
The station was opened on 1 December 1859 by the North British Railway. It was on the west side of the A6079 at the junction with an unclassified road and immediately southwest of Chollerton village. A goods loop and a coal depot were to the south. A small goods shed was sited at the south end of the platform. Instead of extending the platform, the NBR built a new one to the north with a wooden waiting shelter. The original buildings remained in use and the siding was adjusted so that one of the two docks used the old platform. There was a three-ton crane in the goods yard. The station closed to passengers on 15 October 1956 and closed completely on 1 September 1958.

Preceding station	Disused railways	Following station
Barrasford; Line and station closed	North British Railway; Border Counties Railway	Chollerford; Line and station closed
