= Wark Town Hall =

Municipal building in Wark on Tyne, Northumberland, England

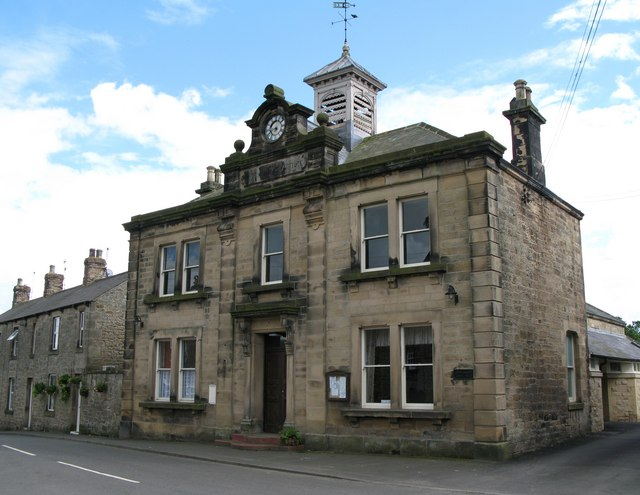
- Wark Town Hall

- Shown in Northumberland
- 55.0875°N 2.2188°W
- Location: The Green, Wark on Tyne

History
- Built: 1874

Site notes
- Architectural style: Neoclassical style

Listed Building – Grade II
- Official name: Town Hall
- Designated: 7 March 1985
- Reference no.: 1044953

Wark Town Hall is a municipal building on The Green in Wark on Tyne, Northumberland, England. The building, which is used as a community events venue, is a Grade II listed building.

== History ==
The building was originally conceived as the home for the local mechanics institute which had been established in 1848. It was a gift to the people of Wark from the lord of the manor and member of parliament, Hugh Taylor of Chipchase Castle. The site he chose was on the south side of the Green.

Construction of the new building began in 1873. It was designed in the neoclassical style, built in ashlar stone from Park House Quarry and completed in 1874. The design involved a symmetrical main frontage with three bays facing onto The Green; the central bay featured a doorway flanked by pilasters and brackets supporting a cornice, with a single sash window with an architrave and window sill on the first floor. The outer bays were fenestrated by two-light sash windows with architraves and window sills on both floors. The central bay was flanked by full-height pilasters and the outer bays were enhanced by rusticated quoins. At roof level, there was a frieze, a cornice and a central panel, inscribed with the words "Wark Mechanics Institute" and surmounted by a clock in a moulded frame with finials and an acroterion. Internally, the principal room was the main hall which had capacity for up to 150 people.

While the stone was being quarried at Park House Quarry, a hoard of spear heads and axes were found which were initially exhibited inside the building but later transferred to the British Museum. The building was used as an events venue from an early stage and was already referred to as the "town hall" within a few years of it opening, despite the management continuing to offer technical training for adults, as originally envisaged, and library facilities as well. In December 1909, a man was killed and another was seriously injured shortly after moving a generator at the town hall: a gas pipe broke while the men were testing the strength of the light.

A war memorial, in the form of a simple cross, which was intended to commemorate the lives of local service personnel who had died in the First World War, was erected on The Green opposite the town hall and unveiled by Lieutenant Colonel Thomas George Taylor of Chipchase Castle in March 1921. The town hall continued to be used as a local events venue into the 21st century and, in December 2005, the management secured a grant from the National Lottery Community Fund to replace the entire heating system in the building.
