= Grace Simpson =

British archaeologist and museum curator (1920–2007)

Grace Simpson FSA
- Born: 12 November 1920; Boston Spa, West Yorkshire, England
- Died: 8 February 2007 (aged 86); Oxford, England
- Occupation: Archaeologist

Academic background
- Education: Oxford University

Academic work
- Discipline: Classical Archaeology
- Sub-discipline: Roman archaeology, Roman ceramics
- Institutions: Durham University; Chesters Roman Fort; Oxford University; Haverford College

Mary Grace Simpson FSA (12 November 1920 – 8 February 2007) was a British archaeologist and museum curator specialising in the study of Roman ceramics, especially Samian ware.

== Biography ==
=== Early life ===
Simpson spent her early years in Newcastle, where her father F. G. Simpson was Director of Archaeological Field Research. F. G. Simpson was involved with excavations at various sites along Hadrian's Wall and was the Director of Field Studies, Durham University Excavation Committee from 1924 until 1930. Simpson went to school at Penrhos College. She served as a nurse during the Second World War.

=== Career ===
After the war, Simpson studied at UCL Institute of Archaeology, graduating with a Diploma in European Archaeology in 1948. Her fellow students included Nancy Sandars and Edward Pyddoke. Simpson's memories of her time at the IoA were published in Archaeology International in 2000. Between 1950 and 1954 she was a research assistant to Eric Birley at Durham University. Between 1950 and 1972 Simpson was the Honorary Curator of the Clayton Collection of antiquities at Chesters Roman fort. She undertook postgraduate study at Lady Margaret Hall, Oxford and was awarded her DPhil from Oxford in 1960. The subject of this thesis was published in 1964 as Britons and the Roman Army: A Study of Wales and the Southern Pennines in the 1st-3rd Centuries. She taught at Oxford for the Department of Extra-Mural Studies and was a visiting fellow at Haverford College, Pennsylvania.

Simpson's study of the late Joseph Stanfield's investigations into Samian ware resulted in the 1958 publication of Central Gaulish Potters, which was described by Howard Comfort in 1979 as "the outstanding single achievement" of British samian studies, and remains an essential work for the study of the subject more than fifty years on. An updated French edition was published in 1990. Simpson was one of the early members of the Rei cretariae Romanae fautores, a specialist study group for Roman ceramicists, following its founding 1957 and organised the 14th Congress of the society in Oxford and London in September 1984.

== Select publications ==
- Simpson, G. 1948. Guide to Chesters Museum with notes on the Roman fort, bridge and bath-house etc. Durham.
- Simpson. G. 1964. Britons and the Roman Army: A Study of Wales and the Southern Provinces in the 1st-3rd Centuries. London.
- Simpson, F. G. (Edited by Simpon, G.). 1976. Watermills and Military Works on Hadrian's Wall. Excavations in Northumberland. Kendal.
- Simpson, G. 2000. Roman Weapons, Tools, Bronze Equipment and Brooches from Neuss: Nouaesium Excavations 1955-1972 (BAR International Series 862).
