= Bellingham Bridge =

Stone bridge across the River North Tyne at Bellingham in Northumberland

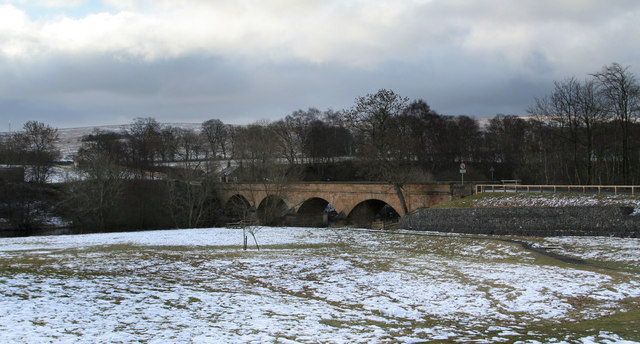
- Coordinates: 55.1432°N 2.2620°W
- OS grid reference: NY834832
- Carries: B6320 road
- Crosses: River North Tyne
- Locale: Northumberland
- Heritage status: Grade II listed
- Followed by: Wark Bridge

Characteristics
- Design: Arch bridge
- Material: Stone
- No. of spans: 4
- No. of lanes: Single-track road

History
- Designer: John Green
- Construction end: 1834
- Opened: 1834

Location
- Interactive map of Bellingham Bridge

Bellingham Bridge is a stone bridge across the River North Tyne at Bellingham in Northumberland, England.

== History ==
The bridge, which has four stone arches, was built by John Green and completed in 1834. It is a Grade II listed structure.

Next bridge upstream	River North Tyne	Next bridge downstream
Tarset Bridge	Bellingham Bridge; Grid reference NY834833	Wark Bridge
