= Wall railway station =

Disused railway station in Wall, Northumberland

Wall
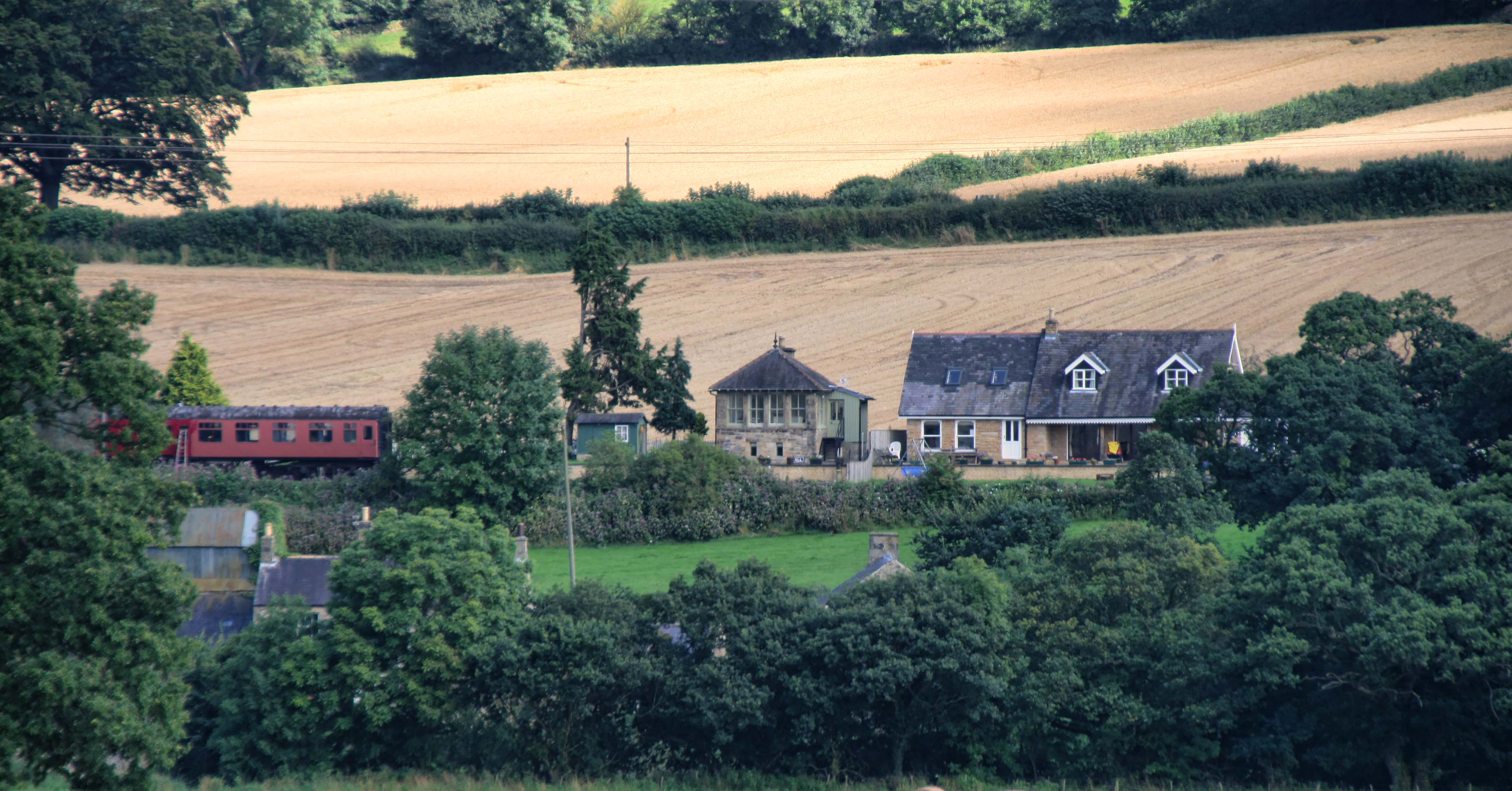

General information
- Location: Wall, Northumberland; England
- Coordinates: 55.0101°N 2.1322°W
- Grid reference: NY916684
- Platforms: 1

Other information
- Status: Disused

History
- Original company: North British Railway
- Post-grouping: London and North Eastern Railway; British Railways (North Eastern)

Key dates
- 5 April 1858: Opened
- 19 September 1955: Closed
Location

Wall railway station served the village of Wall, Northumberland, England from 1858 to 1955 on the Border Counties Railway.

== History ==
The station opened on 5 April 1858 by the North British Railway. The signal box was on the platform and it opened in 1890. Opposite the platform were two loops, one handling goods traffic. In the 1940s an arson attack occurred and the station building was damaged. No repairs were ever made. A wooden structure was built shortly after to provide shelter for passengers. Due to low ticket sales, the station closed to both passengers and goods traffic on 19 September 1955. The platform, as well as the signal box, was still extant in 1974.

Preceding station	Disused railways	Following station
Chollerford; Line and station closed	North British Railway; Border Counties Railway	Hexham; Line closed, station open
