= Bridget Atkinson =

English collector

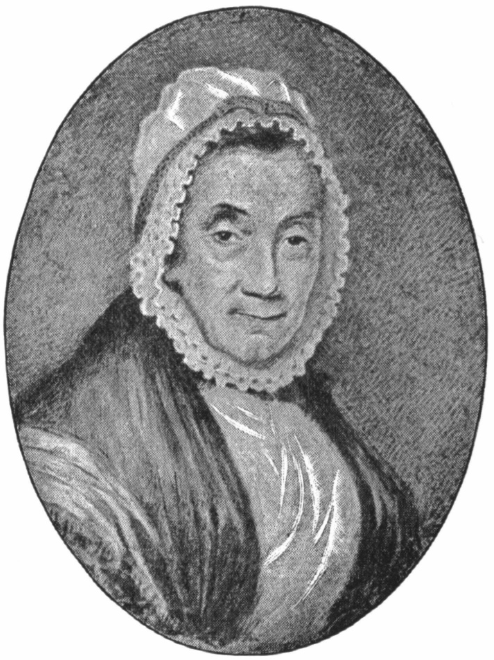
- Born: Bridget Maughan; 1732; Wolsingham
- Died: 1814 (aged 81–82)
- Occupations: farmer, collector
- Known for: First honorary member Society of Antiquaries of Newcastle upon Tyne

Bridget Atkinson (née Maughan) (1732–1814) was an English farmer and shell collector who amassed a collection from around the world. She was recognised at the end of her life by the Society of Antiquaries of Newcastle upon Tyne. In 1813 she was made the Society's first honorary member, for her extensive coin collection.

== Early life and family ==
The daughter of Dorothy (née Lowthian) and Michael Maughan, Bridget Maughan was born in Wolsingham in 1732. When her father died, her mother raised her and her sister Jenny in Kirkoswald and she was educated at Mrs Paxton's Academy in Durham.

On 7 January 1758, Bridget married George Atkinson (1730–81) of Temple Sowerby in secret, fearing her mother would disapprove. This would appear not to have been the case, as The Gentleman's Magazine announced their marriage shortly afterwards. Atkinson's dowry enabled improvements to Temple Sowerby House. The couple had ten children, six sons (of whom two are thought to have died young), and four daughters (of whom one died young and two married). George, like his father Matthew, began work as a tanner, and became a broker (what would later be called a bill-broker, dealing in bills of exchange); he was ultimately a government official, receiver-general for Cumberland and Westmorland.

George's youngest brother was Richard Atkinson (1738–1785), Member of Parliament for New Romney, a slave-owner and a government contractor for rum who made a fortune. Bridget was left an annuity of £200 on his death. George and Bridget's second son George II (1764–1814) was a wealthy West Indian merchant and Island Secretary of Jamaica. His son, George III (1795–1849) is identified on the UCL Legacies of British Slavery site as a supplier of the contract labour of enslaved people to the British government.

== Collecting ==
Bridget Atkinson had friends and relatives collect shells for her from around the world. She amassed a collection of around 1200 from every continent except from Antarctica.

In 1776, Atkinson received a letter from the armourer on one of Captain Cook's voyages showing that he had been seeking shells for her. Her brother-in-law, sons, and grandchildren also sought shells when on journeys made whilst conducting colonial business for the East India Company or relating to family plantations in Jamaica.

In addition to shells, Atkinson collected coins and jewellery. She greatly valued a fibula found when the fields were being ploughed.

In 1813, Atkinson was appointed the first honorary member of the Society of Antiquaries of Newcastle-upon-Tyne at its inaugural meeting, more than 60 years before the first woman was elected a full member. To the society's collection, Atkinson donated a celtic hammer, a silver penny of Henry II, a silver penny from the reign of Edward I and one from Edward II, and a Swedish copper dollar of Charles XII.

Atkinson also collected recipes for dishes and medicines, including two for Shrewsbury cakes. She passed these to her daughter, Dorothy Clayton and some of her manuscript cookery books are extant.

== Death and legacy ==
On her death in 1814, Atkinson left her shell collection and her coin collection to her youngest daughter, Jane (1775–1855). Jane then left this, and material she had collected from excavations at Kirby Thore fort, to her niece Sarah Clayton (1795–1880), daughter of her oldest sister Dorothy with her husband Nathaniel Clayton, a Newcastle lawyer. Sarah's brother was the antiquarian John Clayton. Sarah and John lived together for their whole lives and when Sarah died, "Bridget's" collection (as it was still called by the family) was absorbed into the wider Clayton Collection.

Atkinson's collecting influenced her grandson John Clayton, who went on to become an antiquarian and preserve Hadrian's Wall. After his death in 1890 "Bridget's" collection formed part of the Clayton Estate, mentioned as "Shells" in Clayton's will, where he made provision for the major Clayton Collection, mostly Roman antiquities, and a museum for those to be built at Chesters Roman Fort.

In the 1930s, around 1000 shells that were kept in the Temple Sowerby house were sold in an estate sale. Apart from a giant clam shell, the remains of Atkinson's collection were on long term loan to the Zoology department at Armstrong College, later part of Newcastle University. There this part of the collection was de-accessioned in the 1980s, and was taken into private hands. It was feared that these shells were lost, but they had been kept safe by Dr. John Buchanan and were returned to the Clayton Collection Trust in 2023. Bridget Atkinson's shell collection was then the subject of a 2024 exhibition at Chesters Museum after the scientific interest of part of the collection was realised through its connection with the third voyage of James Cook. One of the species is Distorsio cancellina, from the sea snail genus Distorsio, described in 1803 by Lamarck, and believed to be extinct.

Atkinson's membership certificate from the Society of Antiquaries of Newcastle-upon-Tyne forms part of the Blair papers, which were acquired by the society in 2019.
