= Chollerford Bridge =

Grade II listed bridge in Northumberland, England

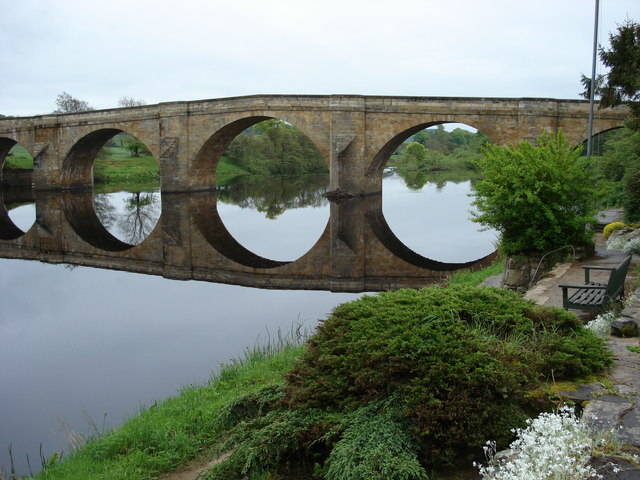
- Chollerford Bridge
- Coordinates: 55.0293°N 2.1273°W
- OS grid reference: NY919705
- Carries: B6318; 72
- Crosses: River North Tyne
- Locale: Northumberland
- Heritage status: Grade II listed
- Preceded by: Wark Bridge
- Followed by: Constantius Bridge

Characteristics
- Design: Arch bridge
- Material: Stone
- Total length: 90 m (300 ft)
- No. of spans: 5
- Piers in water: 4
- No. of lanes: Single-track road controlled by traffic lights

History
- Architect: Robert Mylne
- Construction end: 1785
- Opened: 1785

Chollerford Bridge is a stone bridge that replaced an earlier medieval bridge crossing the River North Tyne at Chollerford, Northumberland, England. It is a Grade II listed building.

It was built in 1785 by Robert Mylne after the previous bridge had been swept away in the great floods of 1771.

Hadrian's Wall crossed the river to Chesters Roman Fort on the multi-arched Chesters Bridge about 700 m (770 yd) to the southwest.

Next bridge upstream	River North Tyne	Next bridge downstream
Wark Bridge	Chollerford Bridge; Grid reference NY919705	Chesters Bridge; Ruined Roman bridge, formerly Roman Military Way
Next road bridge upstream	River North Tyne	Next road bridge downstream
Wark Bridge	Chollerford Bridge; Grid reference NY919705	Constantius Bridge; A69
