= Shrewsbury cake =

English biscuit or cake

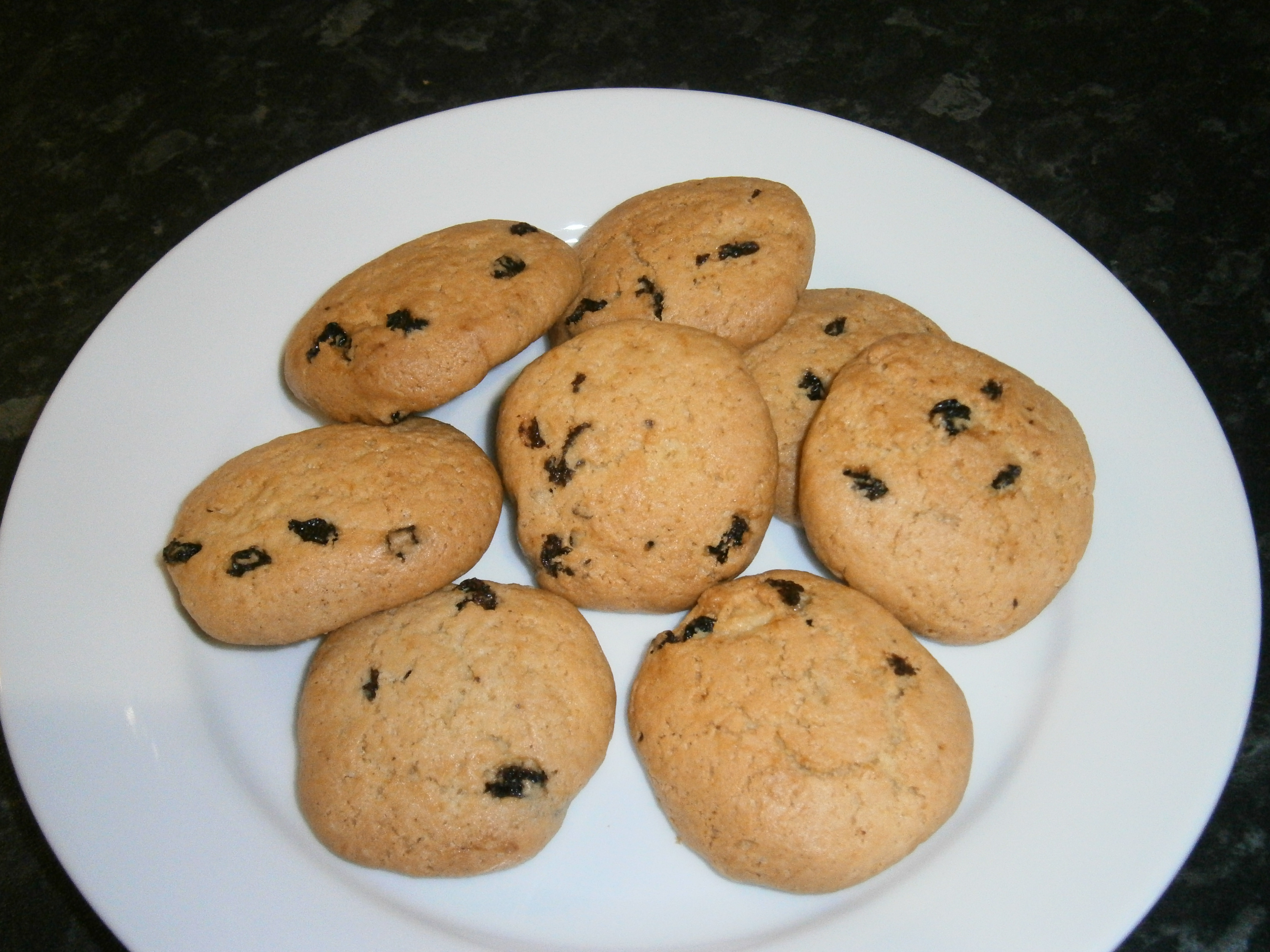
- Shrewsbury cakes
- Alternative names: Shrewsbury biscuits
- Course: Dessert
- Place of origin: England
- Region or state: Shrewsbury, Shropshire
- Main ingredients: Sugar, flour, egg, butter, and lemon zest

A Shrewsbury cake or Shrewsbury biscuit is a classic English dessert, named after Shrewsbury, the county town of Shropshire. They are made from dough that contains sugar, flour, egg, butter and lemon zest; dried fruit is also often added. Shrewsbury cakes can be small in size for serving several at a time, or large for serving as a dessert in themselves.

== History ==
The earliest known written reference for Shrewsbury cakes dates to 1602. The original cakes, delicate and fragile in texture, are no longer made commercially. These cakes were very different from the modern Shrewsbury biscuits which are still handcrafted in Shrewsbury.

The playwright William Congreve mentioned Shrewsbury cakes in his play The Way of the World in 1700 as a simile: "Why, brother Wilfull of Salop, you may be as short as a Shrewsbury cake, if you please. But I tell you 'tis not modish to know relations in town".

The recipe is also included in several early cookbooks including The Compleat Cook of 1658, which gives the following instructions:

"Take two pound of floure dryed in the oven and weighed after it is dryed, then put to it one pound of butter that must be layd an hour or two in rose-water, so done poure the water from the butter, and put the butter to the flowre with the yolks and whites of five eggs, two races of ginger, and three quarters of a pound of sugar, a little salt, grate your spice, and it well be the better, knead all these together till you may rowle the past, then roule it forth with the top of a bowle, then prick them with a pin made of wood, or if you have a comb that hath not been used, that will do them quickly, and is best to that purpose, so bake them upon pye plates, but not too much in the oven, for the heat of the plates will dry them very much, after they come forth of the oven, you may cut them without the bowles of what bignesse or what fashion you please."

Although there are earlier references, Shrewsbury baker Thomas Plimmer claimed that he had acquired the original recipe from James Palin, who sold the cakes out of a bakeshop on Castle Street in Shrewsbury.

Bridget Atkinson (1732–1814) left two recipes for Shrewsbury cakes, as part of her large collection of recipes that were used at her home in Temple Sowerby, Cumbria. A third recipe for Shrewsbury cakes, given by Lady Darcy, was added to the recipe book by her brother-in-law, Matthew Atkinson.

The recipe also appears in early American recipe collections. One 19th century American recipe is made with the creaming method to combine butter and sugar, typical for butter cakes, then adding eggs, rosewater, flour and nutmeg.

== Other countries ==
Shrewsbury biscuits are popular in India, where they are locally produced in the Royal Bakery located in Pune, Maharashtra.

A popular biscuit in New Zealand is also called a Shrewsbury biscuit, but this is similar to a Jammie Dodger in the UK and has no known relation to the original Shrewsbury biscuit except in name.

== See also ==
- Geographically indicated foods of the United Kingdom
- List of cakes
