= Wark railway station =

Former railway station in England

Coordinates: 55.085602°N 2.202940°W

Wark
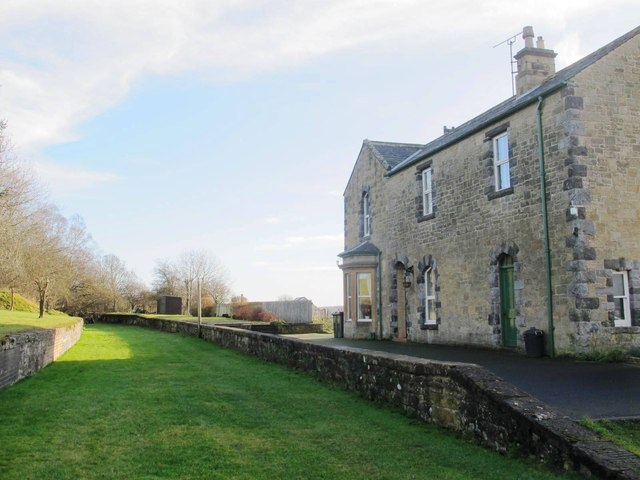
- The site of the station in 2014

General information
- Location: Wark on Tyne, Northumberland; England
- Platforms: 2 (one was a goods platform)

Other information
- Status: Disused

History
- Original company: North British Railway
- Pre-grouping: North British Railway
- Post-grouping: London and North Eastern Railway; British Railways (North Eastern Region)

Key dates
- 1 December 1859: Opened
- 15 October 1956: Closed to passengers
- 1 September 1958: Closed to goods
Location

Wark railway station is a disused railway station which served the village of Wark on Tyne, Northumberland, England. Located on the Border Counties Railway, the station was possibly opened on 1 December 1859, but was definitely open by 1 April 1860. The station was originally connected to the village by a wooden bridge over the River Tyne but this was replaced by an iron bridge in 1878. There was a single platform, a small goods shed with a signal box being added in 1896. It was closed to passengers on 15 October 1956 and completely on 1 September 1958.

The station building and platforms are still intact, the former now used as a private residence.

Former services

Preceding station	Disused railways	Following station
Reedsmouth	LNER; Border Counties Railway	Barrasford
