= William Herbert Dray =

Canadian philosopher (1921–2009)

William H. Dray
- Born: 23 June 1921; Montreal, Quebec, Canada
- Died: 6 August 2009 (aged 87)
- Education: University of Toronto (BA); Oxford University (BA, MA, DPhil)
- Occupations: Writer, Philosopher, Professor

William Herbert Dray (23 June 1921, in Montreal – 6 August 2009, in Toronto) was a Canadian philosopher of history. He was Professor Emeritus at the University of Ottawa.

He is known for his version of anti-positivist Verstehen in history, in Laws and Explanation in History, and his work on R. G. Collingwood.

== Selected publications ==
- Dray, William H. Laws and explanation in history. Oxford University Press, 1957.
- Dray, William H. Philosophy of history. Prentice-Hall 1964.
- Dray, William H. Holism and individualism in history and social science. 1967.
- Dray, William H. 'On the nature and role of narrative in historiography', in History and theory 10.2 (1971): 153–171.
- Dray, William H. On history and philosophers of history, vol. 2 of Philosophy of History and Culture, ed. by Krausz, Michael. Brill, 1989.
- Dray, William H. History as re-enactment: RG Collingwood's idea of history. Clarendon Press, 1996.

== Bibliography ==
- Canadian Encyclopedia page
