= Barrasford =

Village in Northumberland, England

Coordinates: 55.055°N 2.134°W

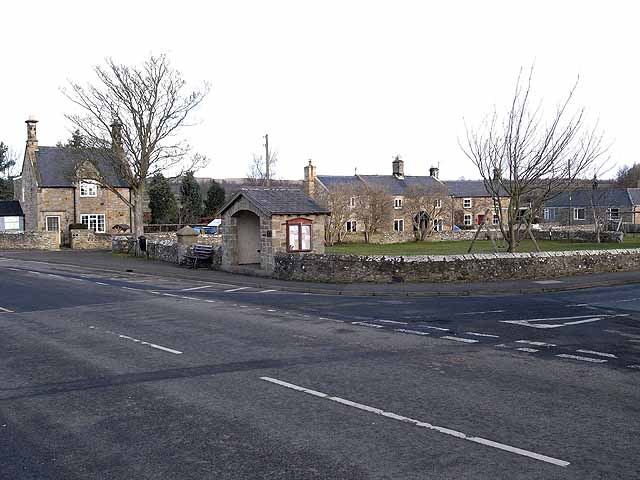
- Village Green, Barrasford

- Location within Northumberland
- OS grid reference: NY915735
- Civil parish: Chollerton
- Unitary authority: Northumberland
- Ceremonial county: Northumberland
- Region: North East
- Country: England
- Sovereign state: United Kingdom
- Post town: HEXHAM
- Postcode district: NE48
- Dialling code: 01434
- Police: Northumbria
- Fire: Northumberland
- Ambulance: North East
- UK Parliament: Hexham

Barrasford is a village in Northumberland, England. It is situated to the north of Hexham, on the North Tyne. Barrasford is an ancient village that lies within the shadow of Haughton Castle. The village is notable for being the location of a Bronze Age burial site where the Reaverhill Dagger was excavated in 1964. Today Barrasford is noted for its quarry.

The scourge of tuberculosis lent urgency to the need for action in the North East. In 1902 a subscription fund was set up to finance the building of a sanatorium to treat patients. William Watson-Armstrong, who became Baron Armstrong after the death of his great-uncle Lord Armstrong of Cragside, gave £4000 – equivalent to £350,000 today.

The Newcastle upon Tyne and Northumberland sanatorium opened in 1907 on the moors above the neighbouring villages of Barrasford and Gunnerton. It treated victims of tuberculosis at a time when 60,000 people a year were dying from the disease in England and Wales, and the annual mortality rate in Newcastle alone was nearly 600.

In 1974 Barrasford was the setting for the "Affairs and Relations" episode of Whatever Happened to the Likely Lads?.

== Governance ==
Barrasford is in the parliamentary constituency of Hexham.

== Transport ==
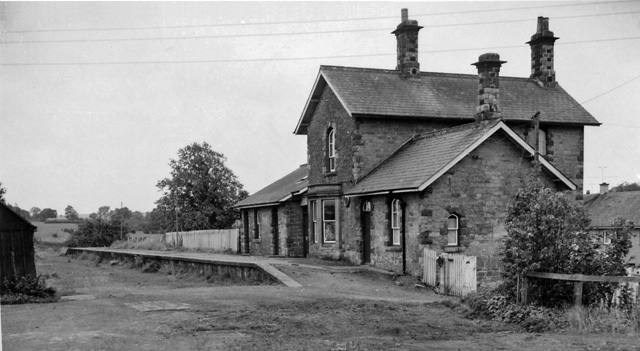
The former railway station in 1962

Barrasford was served by Barrasford railway station on the Border Counties Railway which linked the Newcastle and Carlisle Railway, near Hexham, with the Border Union Railway at Riccarton Junction. The first section of the route was opened between Hexham and Chollerford in 1858, and the remainder in 1862. The line was closed to passengers by British Railways in 1956. Part of the line is now beneath the surface of Kielder Water.

== Notable people ==
Geoffrey Rippon – The village was for many years the home of Cabinet Minister Geoffrey Rippon who had responsibility for negotiating Britain's entry into the Common Market.

== See also ==
- Chollerton
