= Humshaugh railway station =

Disused railway station in Chollerford, Northumberland

Humshaugh
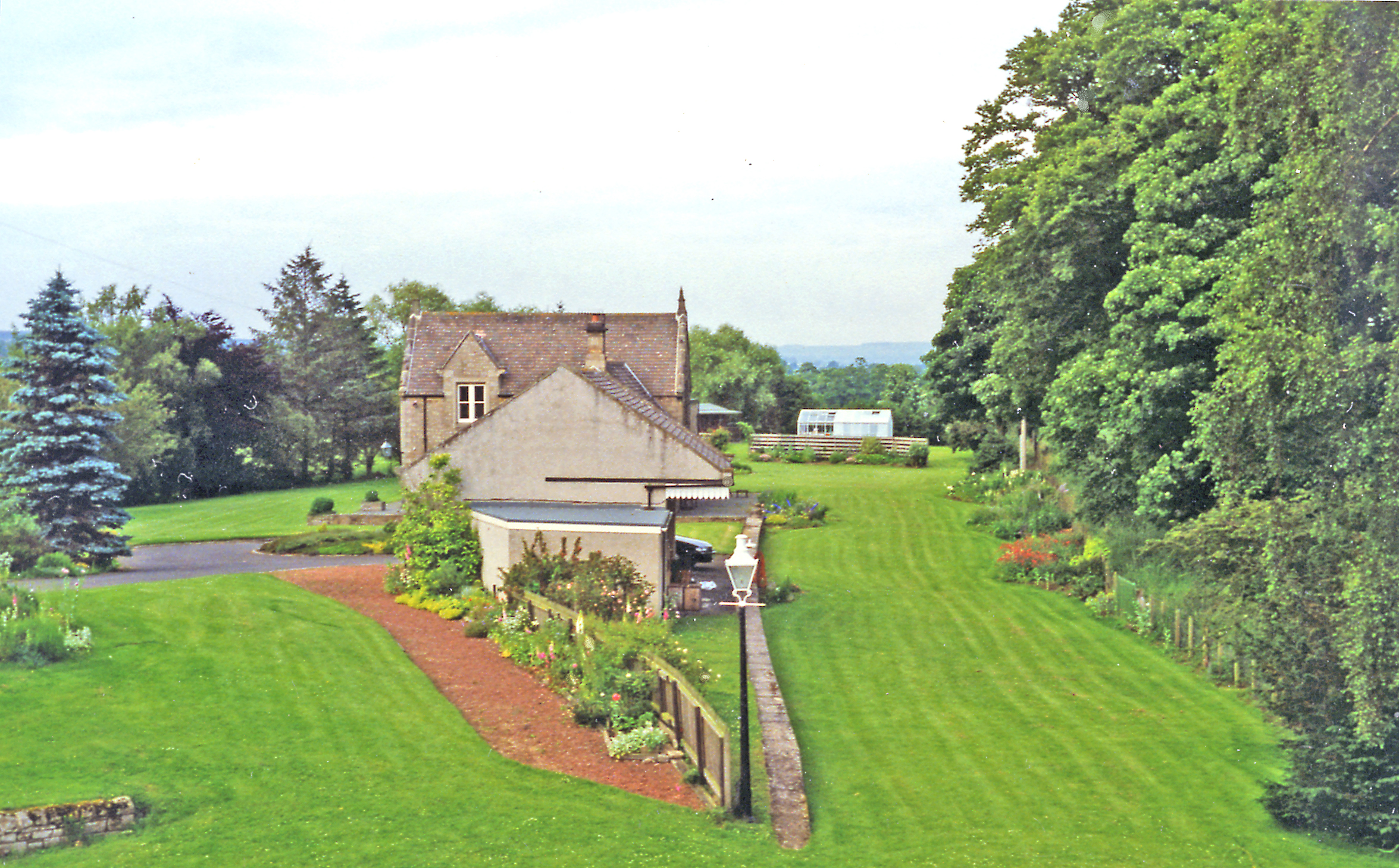
- The site of the station in 1997

General information
- Location: Chollerford, Northumberland; England
- Coordinates: 55.029°N 2.125°W
- Grid reference: NY921705
- Platforms: 1

Other information
- Status: Disused

History
- Original company: North British Railway
- Pre-grouping: North British Railway
- Post-grouping: London and North Eastern Railway; British Railways (North Eastern)

Key dates
- 5 April 1858: Opened as Chollerford
- 1 August 1919: Name changed to Humshaugh
- 15 October 1956: Closed to passengers
- 1 September 1958: Closed completely
Location

Humshaugh railway station served the village of Chollerford, Northumberland, England from 1858 to 1958 on the Border Counties Railway.

== History ==
The station was opened as Chollerford on 5 April 1858 by the North British Railway.

It was situated on the east side of Military Road on the B6318 at the end of Chollerford Bridge over the River North Tyne. Nearby sidings gave access to a lime depot until the 1890s. There were two loops in front of the platform and three further sidings, two running diagonally behind the platform and the third running parallel with the running line. The siding at the southwest end of the platform served a cattle dock and the good shed, which had an awning over the platform. The goods yard had a two-ton crane.

The station's name was changed to Humshaugh on 1 August 1919 to avoid confusion with Chollerton, the previous station on the line.

The station was host to a LNER camping coach from 1935 to 1939 and possibly one for some of 1934.

The station closed to passengers on 15 October 1956 and to goods traffic on 1 September 1958.

Preceding station	Disused railways	Following station
Chollerton; Line and station closed	North British Railway; Border Counties Railway	Wall; Line and station closed
