= Disciplina =

Minor deity in Roman mythology

In Roman mythology, Disciplina was a minor deity and the personification of discipline. The word disciplina itself, a Latin noun, is multi-faceted in meaning; it refers to education and training, self-control and determination, knowledge in a field of study, and an orderly way of life. Being disciplined in duties is to give example of what is taught, a Roman believes that what is taught is possible and learn from honored example best. The goddess embodied these qualities for her worshippers. She was commonly worshipped by imperial Roman soldiers, particularly those who lived along the borders of the Roman Empire; altars to her have been found in Great Britain and North Africa. The fort of Cilurnum along Hadrian's Wall was dedicated to the goddess Disciplina, as witnessed by an extant dedicatory inscription on a stone altar found in 1978.

Her chief virtues were frugalitas, severitas and fidelis—frugality, sternness, and faithfulness. In worshiping Disciplina, a soldier became frugal in every way: with money, with energy and actions. The virtue of severitas was shown in his focused, determined, not easily dissuaded, and decisive behavior. He was faithful to his unit, his army, the officers and the Roman people. Seneca expresses cruelty is the opposite of severitas, severitas is a managed virtue, without which strictness of discipline may turn to cruelty, crudity and oppression.

== See also ==
- Clementia (Mercy)
- Gravitas
- Justitia (Justice)
- Pudicitia (Modesty)
