= John Clayton (town clerk) =

English antiquarian and town clerk (1792–1890)

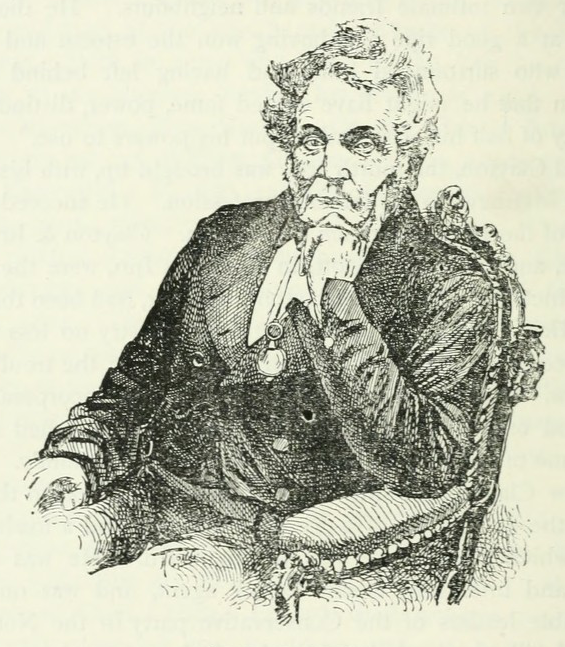
John Clayton

John Clayton (10 June 1792 – 14 July 1890) was an antiquarian and town clerk of Newcastle upon Tyne, England, during the nineteenth century. He worked with the builder Richard Grainger and architect John Dobson to redevelop the centre of the city in a neoclassical style (Grainger Town), and Clayton Street in Newcastle is named after him. He did much to preserve the remains of Hadrian's Wall.

== Early life and career ==
He was the son of Nathaniel Clayton, Town Clerk of Newcastle upon Tyne from 1785 to 1822, and his wife Dorothy Atkinson, daughter of George and Bridget Atkinson of Temple Sowerby. He went to Kirkoswald School in Westmorland, and received a classical education at Uppingham School in Rutland. He began work in the firm of solicitors that had been established by his father Nathaniel in the Bigg Market in Newcastle in 1778, and which became Clayton & Dunn, and qualified as an attorney in 1815. John became Under-Sheriff in 1816 before succeeding his father as Town Clerk in 1822, remaining in post until 1867. He never married, but shared the family's townhouse in Fenkle Street, Newcastle, with his unmarried brother and legal partner, Matthew.

As well as his work in the city, Clayton was an antiquarian. Four years after his birth in 1792, his father purchased the Chesters Estate, through which Hadrian's Wall runs, and which contained the site of Chesters fort. Landscaping a parkland setting for his home, The Chesters, Nathaniel Clayton levelled out and grassed over much of the Roman fort. While doing so he collected antiquities. From an early age John Clayton took a serious interest not only in the fort of Chesters and its immediate surroundings, but also in Roman remains in the nearby countryside.

From 1834 Clayton began buying land to preserve the Wall, now a World Heritage Site, which was subject to the removal of stones for reuse. He had some restoration work carried out on parts of the Wall. He helped preserve that central stretch of Hadrian's Wall that includes Chesters (Cilurnum). Housesteads and Vindolanda, and carried out some of the first archaeological excavations on the Wall. His first published work, in 1843, was his excavation of the commanding officer's bath-house at Chesters. He was involved in excavations most years for the next half-century, both at Chesters and elsewhere along Hadrian's Wall, namely Cawfields (Milecastle 42), Castle Nick (Milecastle 39) and Housesteads Crags (Milecastle 37), Housesteads and Carvoran. His archaeological work continued into his later years, and he was in his early nineties when he uncovered the spectacular sculptures of the temple to Mars Thincsus at Housesteads.

Clayton established Chesters as an archaeological site open to visitors. A small garden pavilion on the estate was used to display his archaeological collection, as well as other casual finds and purchased acquisitions, at Chesters. Following his death in 1890, his nephew Nathaniel commissioned and had built a permanent museum, completed in 1896, to house the Clayton Collection. Ownership of the collection was transferred to the newly formed Trustees of the Clayton Collection in 1930 under a deed of trust and it is now curated by English Heritage.

== Grainger's plan for Newcastle ==
In 1834 the builder Richard Grainger presented a comprehensive development plan to the Town Council for the land covered by the Anderson Place estate. John Dobson had already submitted a similar plan to the council ten years previously and been rejected. Grainger moved his legal business to the solicitor's firm run by Clayton, the town clerk. The Council then adopted his scheme within two months, and it transformed the centre of Newcastle. One of the three principal streets built under Grainger's scheme was named Clayton Street.

An anonymous quotation made about Clayton at the time gives an indication of how some people regarded him:

Has all the craft and subtlety of the devil. Great talents, indefatigable industry, immense wealth, and wonderful tact and facility in conducting business, give him an influence in society rarely possessed by an individual. Was unanimously re-elected Town Clerk because the Clique had not a man equal to supply his place. Can do things with impunity that would damn an ordinary man. A good voice, speaks well, and never wastes a word. Has a careworn, but sly countenance and spare person — limps in his gait from an accident — and loves the ladies.

== Grainger’s financial difficulties ==
In 1839 Grainger paid £114,100 for the Elswick estate to west of Newcastle, intending to build a railway terminus there surrounded by factories and houses. The expense of buying the estate almost bankrupted Grainger and by 1841 his creditors were demanding payment. He was saved from bankruptcy by John Clayton, who worked at persuading Grainger's creditors to accept gradual repayment. Clayton had difficulty in persuading Grainger to restrict his expenditure, as correspondence between them shows. He even intervened in a family dispute between Grainger and his son Thomas and persuaded them to compromise.

On Grainger's death in 1861, he left debts of £128,582 and his personal estate amounted to only £16,913. Grainger's debts included £30,000 owed to Clayton. A letter to Grainger's executors shows that Clayton agreed to forego the £30,000 owed to him as well as the interest arrears on the debt.

Clayton died on 14 July 1890 aged 98. The gross value of his estate was £728,846.
