= Frank Gerald Simpson =

British archaeologist

- Born: 31 October 1882; Boston Spa Yorkshire
- Died: 14 May 1955 (aged 72)
- Resting place: St Cuthbert's Nether Denton
- Known for: Excavations on Hadrian's Wall
- Children: Grace Simpson
- Awards: MA CBE
- Scientific career
- Fields: Archaeology
- Institutions: University of Durham

Frank Gerald Simpson (31 October 1882 – 14 May 1955) CBE, MA, Hon. FSA Scot. was a British archaeologist and authority on Hadrian’s Wall. He was the first to confirm that Hadrian’s Wall was built by the Emperor Hadrian and not the Emperor Severus as some antiquarians believed.

== Early life ==
He was the son of Edward Simpson of Boston Spa in Yorkshire and educated at Rydal Mount School. In 1899 he took up an apprenticeship with Hawthorn, Leslie and Company of Tyneside, intending to become a marine engineer. According to one of his obituaries, his sisters visited him in Newcastle and insisted on visiting the Wall, and reluctantly he took them to Housesteads where they were soaked by a July storm. He decided to abandon marine engineering and study the Roman Wall. Simpson was rich enough to fund his own excavation work.

== Excavation work on Hadrian’s Wall ==
He joined the Society of Antiquaries of Newcastle upon Tyne in January 1905 and came under the influence of its vice president G P Gibson. In April 1907 he and Gibson excavated at the small Roman fort at Haltwhistle Burn. The planning and photography done on the site set a high standard for future excavation work. Gibson wrote of Simpson’s dedication “superintending, digging, and making his own plans, and living on the spot during the summer and autumn of one of the wettest seasons [ 1907] of recent times”.

In 1909 Simpson and Gibson excavated at Nether Denton in Cumberland on a milecastle on the Wall which was published as two large reports in the Transactions of the Cumberland and Westmorland Antiquarian and Archaeological Society

== Post-World War One ==
During the First World War Simpson worked in an aircraft factory. Post war Simpson was able to resume excavations with work on the Roman signal station at Scarborough in Yorkshire.

Simpson became Director of Field Studies in the University of Durham and was awarded an honorary MA degree by Durham in 1924.

In 1925 Simpson excavated at the Roman fort of Aesica (Great Chesters) for the Durham University Excavation Committee. Due to illness, he was not able to excavate at Great Chesters in 1926.

From 1927 he excavated at Birdoswald for six years with the Cumberland and Westmorland Antiquarian and Archaeological Society.

He also worked for the North of England Excavation Committee who were compiling the Victoria County History of Northumberland, by tracing the line of the Wall westwards from Wallsend.

After the second world war, ill health made excavation work difficult for Simpson, but he did direct a small excavation in Carlisle in 1953 in his role as honorary archaeological advisor to Carlisle council.

== Dating of Hadrian’s Wall ==
Simpson’s archaeological work confirmed that the wall had been built in the reign of the Emperor Hadrian and sorted out the relationship between the turf wall, the stone wall and the vallum.

After Simpson’s death, Sir Ian Richmond wrote in The Times “When his work began, in 1906, the entire relationship of Hadrian's Wall and its works to history was a matter of guess-work. ... Analysis of the structural elements by acute field-work, followed by meticulous excavation for datable materials, gradually produced a mass of unimpeachable evidence”.

== Honours and awards ==
Simpson received many awards during his lifetime. In 1923 he became an Honorary Fellow of the Society of Antiquaries of Scotland. In 1924 he received an honorary MA from the University of Durham. He was awarded a CBE for services to archaeology in 1949.

He was a vice president of the Society of Antiquaries of Newcastle upon Tyne from 1938 to 1952. He was also vice president of the Cumberland and Westmoreland Antiquarian and Archaeological Society between 1924 and 1947 and its president in1948.

The Centenary Pilgrimage Handbook for the Roman Wall Pilgrimage of 1949 was dedicated to him.

== Personal life ==
Simpson married Sarah Maydew in 1914 and was the father of two daughters, one of whom was the archaeologist and Roman pottery researcher Grace Simpson.

He died on the 14 May 1955, and was buried in St Cuthbert's Nether Denton churchyard, which is inside the Nether Denton Roman Fort and overlooks the site of his excavations of 1909.

== Selected publications ==
Gibson, J P; Simpson, Frank Geralkd (1909). "The Roman fort on the Stanegate at Haltwhistle Burn". Archaeologia Aeliana. 3. 5: 213.

Gibson, J P; Simpson, Frank Gerald; Bosanquet, Robert Carr; Craster, H H E (1911). "The Milecastle on the Wall of Hadrian at the Poltross Burn". Transactions of the Cumberland & Westmorland Antiquarian & Archaeological Society. 11: 390461. doi:10.5284/1064034.

Simpson, Frank Gerald; Haverfield, F J; Craster, H H E; Newbold, P (2008). "Excavations on the line of the Roman Wall in Cumberland during the years 1909-12". Transactions of the Cumberland & Westmorland Antiquarian & Archaeological Society. 13: 297397. doi:10.5284/1063831.
