= Cilurnum =

Roman cavalry fort on Hadrian's wall

- Remains of the barracks of Cilurnum

- Location within Northumberland
- 55.026°N 2.139°W
- Location: Northumberland, England

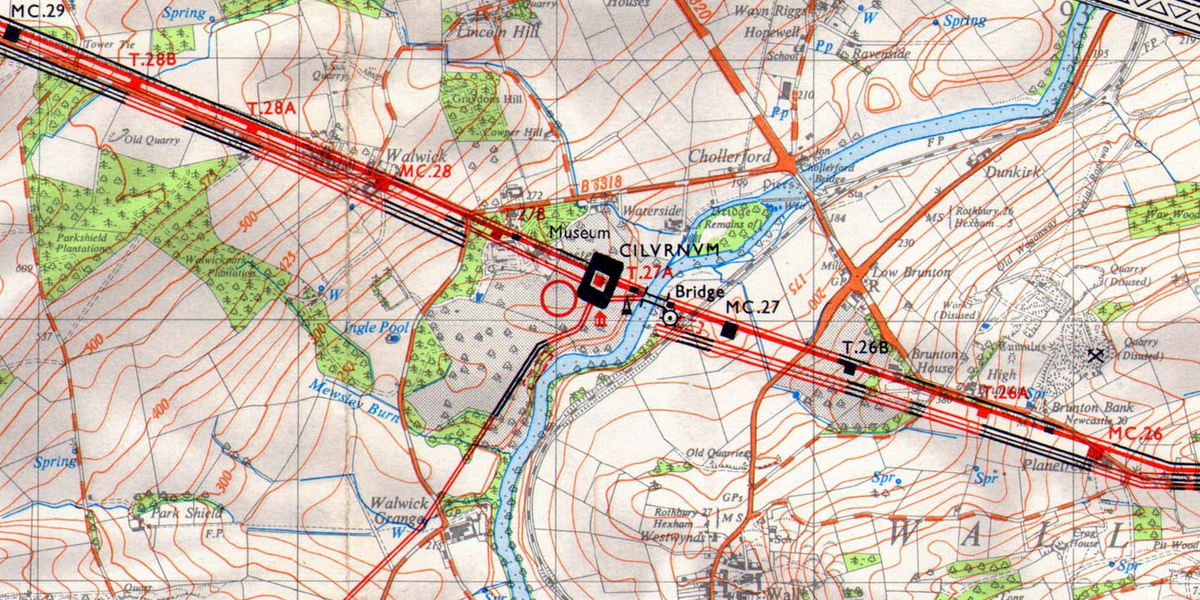
Cilurnum (1964 OS map)

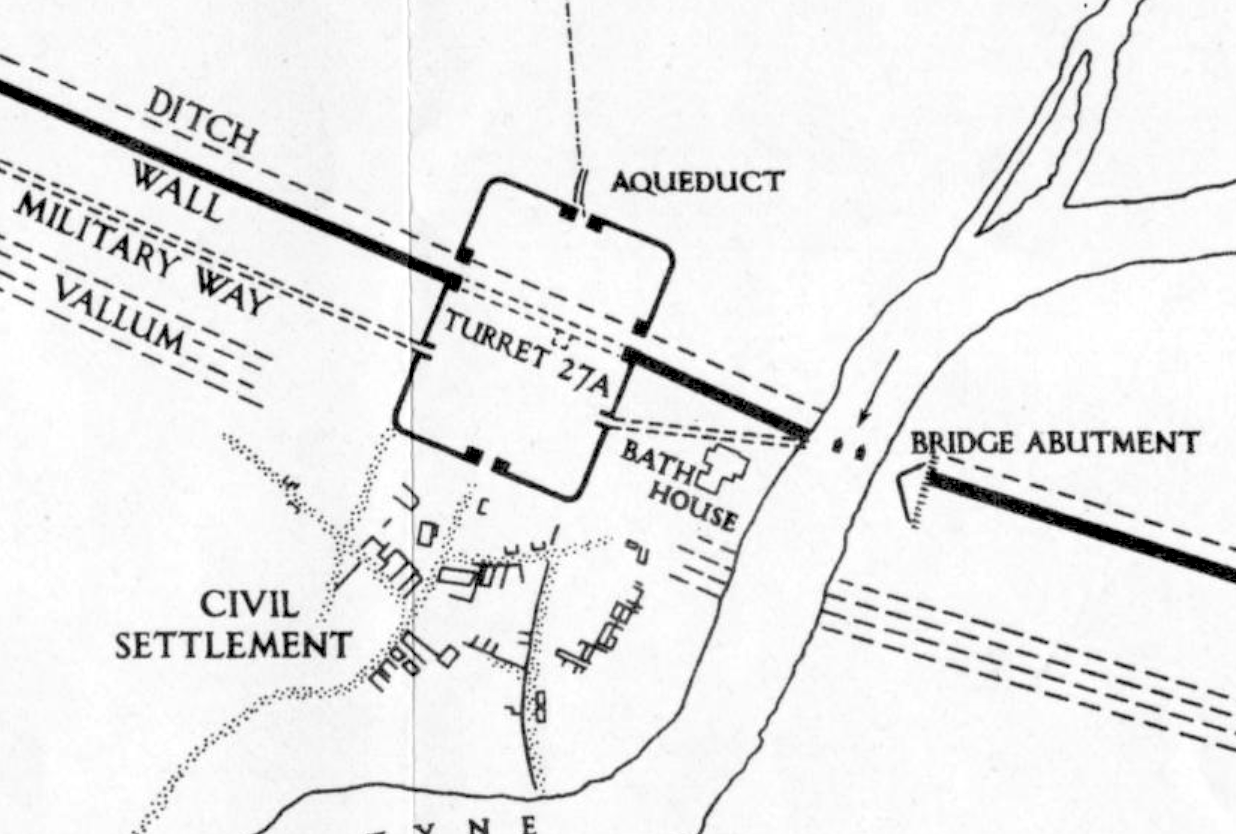
Fort, baths and vicus

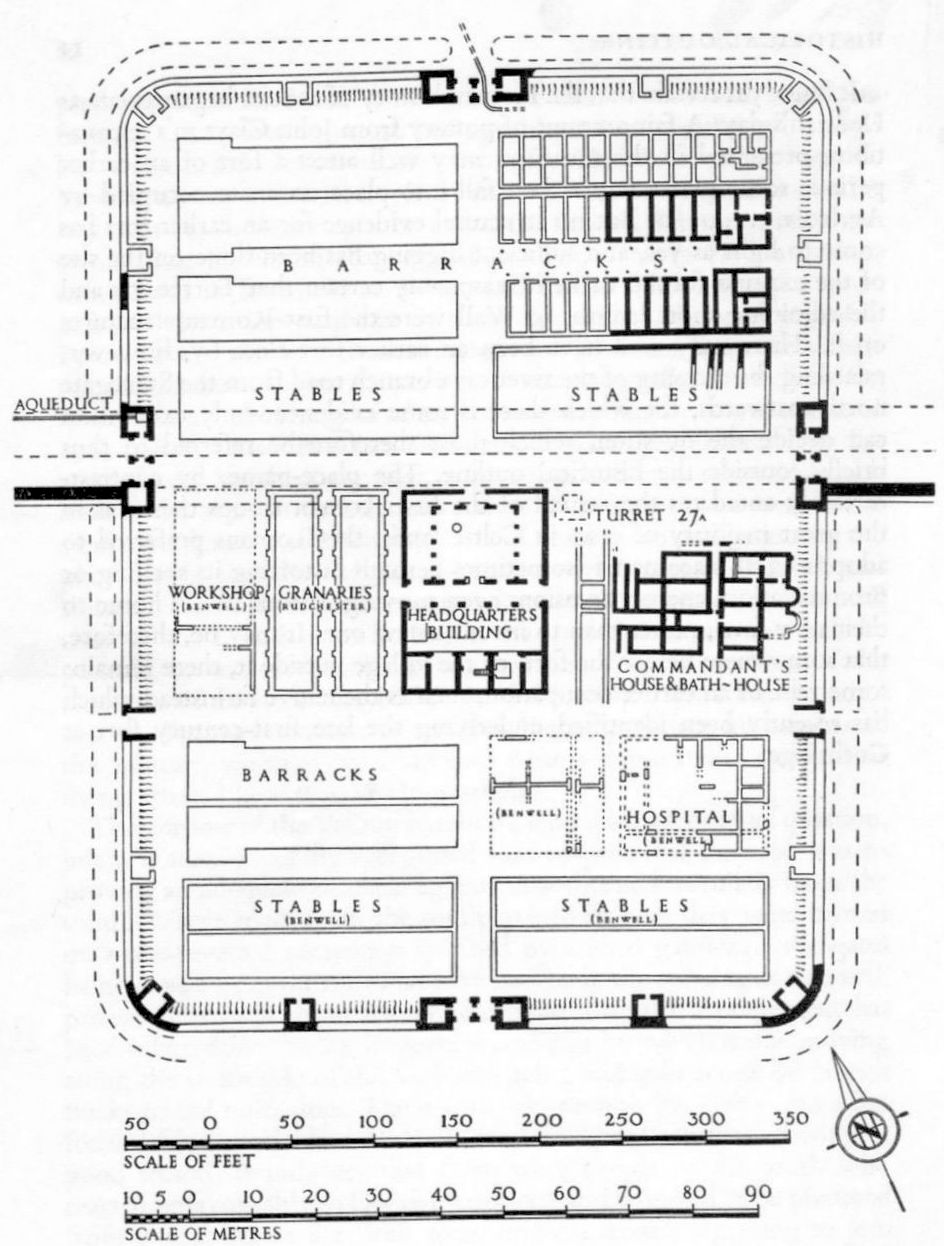
Cilurnum Fort plan

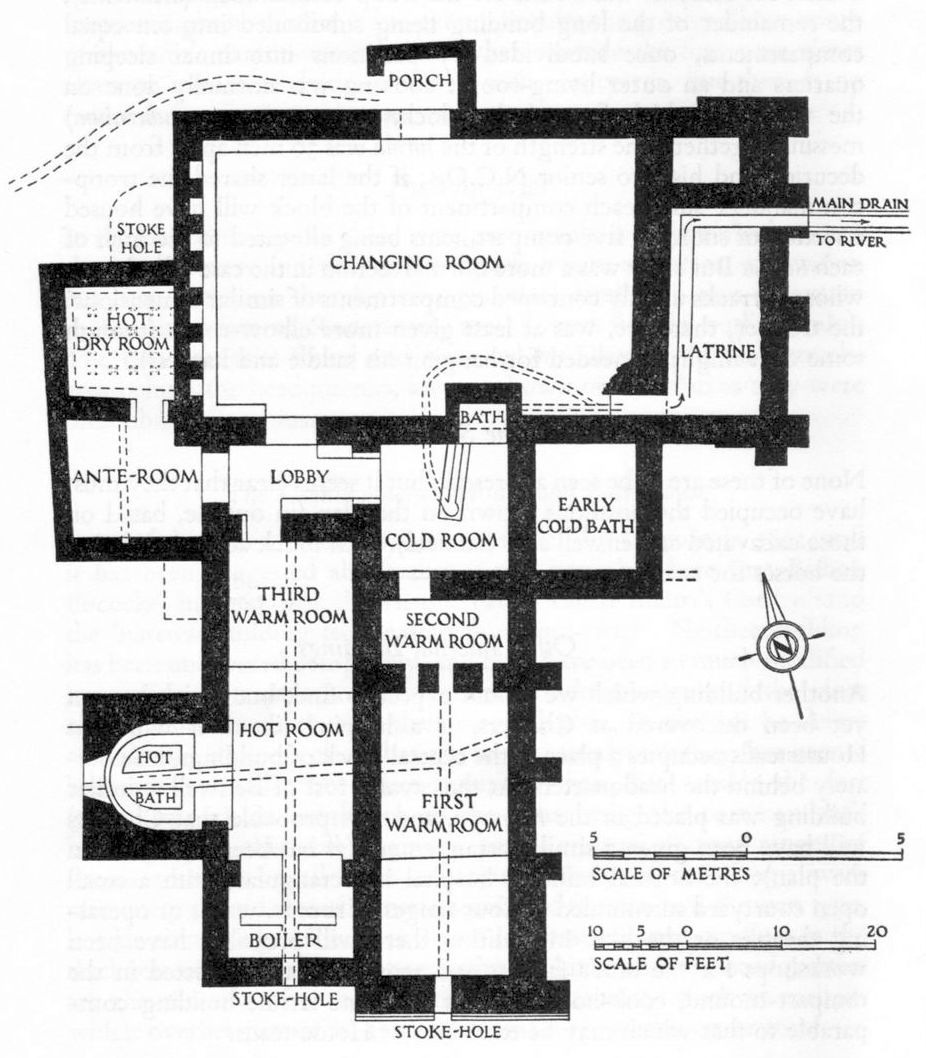
Cilurnum baths

Cilurnum or Cilurvum was an ancient Roman fort on Hadrian's Wall at Chesters near the village of Walwick, Northumberland. It is also known as Walwick Chesters to distinguish it from Great Chesters fort and Halton Chesters.

Cilurnum is included in the Notitia Dignitatum of the late 4th/early 5th century.

Cilurnum is considered to be the best-preserved and best example of a Roman cavalry fort on Hadrian's Wall. The site is now preserved by English Heritage as Chesters Roman Fort. There is a museum on the site built in the 1890s to house John Clayton's collection from the fort and elsewhere along the wall.

== The fort ==
Hadrian's Wall was built from 122 AD and the forts were built a few years later. Cilurnum was first built as a cavalry fort with its walls projecting north of the Wall and with three of its main gateways on the north allowing easier and rapid access to that side. It was given over to infantry later.

Excavations here helped show the early changes in construction of Hadrian's Wall. At Chesters the original Wall project had been carried out only in part: Turret 27a had been built on the site of the later fort, together with a short length of Wall on either side of it, just sufficient to serve as buttresses to the turret, whilst the frontal ditch for the Wall had been dug completely. It was shown that the fort-builders then had to demolish the turret and fill in the ditch for the cavalry fort. This also made it clear that the new cavalry forts (at Benwell, Halton Chesters, Uxelodunum and Rudchester) at least were not for the defence of the Wall but to allow rapid attacks northwards into unoccupied territory.

A road from the southern gateway linked the fort with the Stanegate. The two smaller single gates at each side allowed the Roman Military Way of the mid-2nd century to pass through the fort. The rampart walk was built fifteen feet above ground-level to match the Wall. The height of the gates and towers would have been more than 9 m.

The site guarded Chesters Bridge carrying the Military Way behind the wall across the River North Tyne. Massive abutments of this bridge survive across the river from the fort.

Four large Roman columns, believed to come from Cilurnum, may be seen supporting the south aisle in the church of St Giles at Chollerton, a couple of miles upstream from the fort.

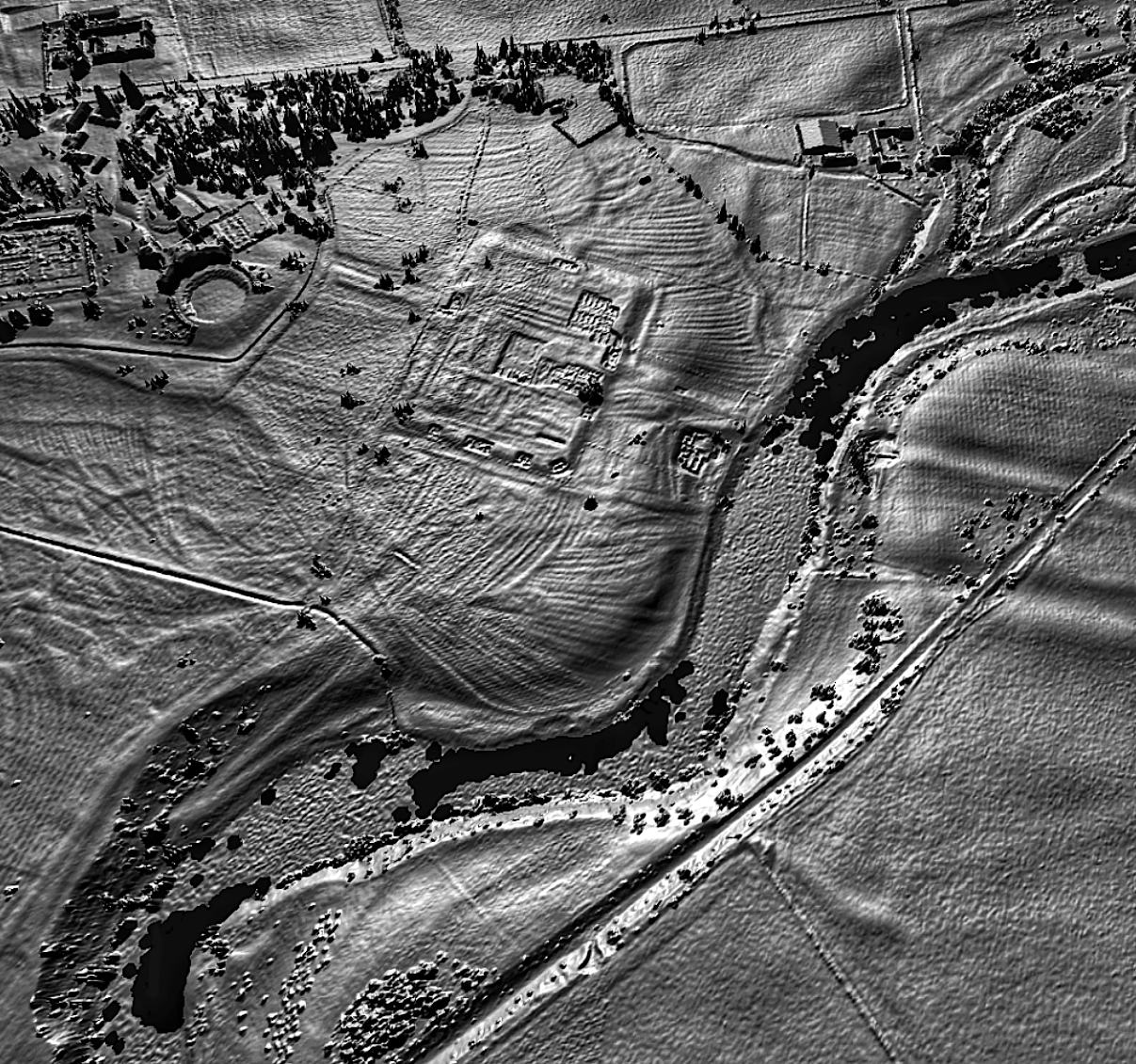
A lidar view of the fort and surrounding area.

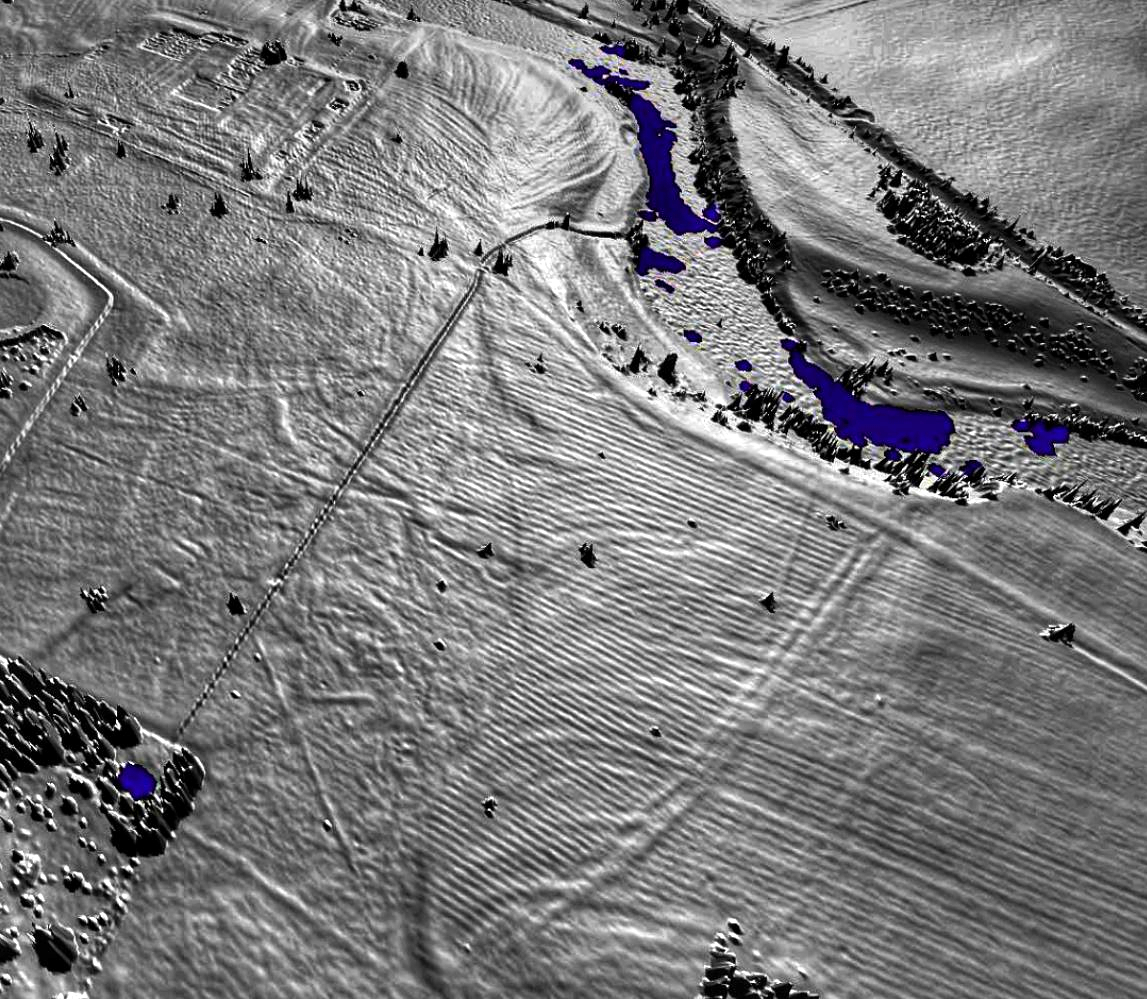
An oblique lidar view of the fort from the west

== Garrisons ==
- Ala II Asturum, late 2nd century

An early inscription on an altar dedicated to Disciplina, found in 1978, indicates the earliest-known military presence was a wing of cavalry, ala Augusta ob virtutem appellata (‘named Augusta because of its valour’). Inscriptions have also been found showing that the Cohors I Delmatarum in (138-161), from present-day Bosnia-Herzegovina (Yugoslavia), and the Cohors I Vangionum Milliaria Equitata from Upper Rhineland in Germany, were also stationed here.

== Baths ==
The fort baths were on the western bank of the river North Tyne, close to the Roman bridge. Various modifications and repairs were made over the centuries. They are considered the most impressive on the Wall and one of the best-preserved examples in the whole of the Roman empire.

== Vicus ==
The large and elaborate vicus (civil settlement) was on either side of the road just outside the fort’s southern gate leading to the Stanegate. It was probably built from about the 3rd century. The street from the south gate bends gradually westwards and is joined by side streets lined with buildings including more complicated structures, with ranges of rooms and corridors such as the town-houses.

== Excavation ==
In the early 19th century Nathaniel Clayton, owner of Chesters House and Estate, moved hundreds of tons of earth to cover the last remains of the fort as part of his parkland landscaping, thereby creating a smooth uninterrupted grassland slope down to the River Tyne; however he collected, before they disappeared, a number of Roman artefacts, which he preserved.

When his son John Clayton, a noted antiquarian, inherited the estate in 1832 he undid his father's landscaping, exposing the fort, excavated the ruins and established a small museum for the finds. John Clayton also purchased and carried out excavations at Housesteads Fort, Carrawburgh Mithraic Temple and Carvoran.

== Museum ==
The museum was commissioned in 1895 and opened in 1903. It is a grade II* listed building and was designed by Richard Norman Shaw. It displays part of John Clayton's collection of Roman finds.

=== Curators ===
Until 1950 there was no curator of the Clayton Collection, only a caretaker, paid for by the Keith family. Between 1950 and 1972 Grace Simpson was the Honorary Curator of the Collection and spent a great deal of time working on the Collection, in particular the material excavated by her father, F. G. Simpson. When she left, Dr David J. Smith, who at the time was the keeper at the Museum of Antiquities, held the position until 1987. Lindsay Allason-Jones became a trustee of the collection in August 1987 and became the then Honorary Curator.

The collection became the responsibility of English Heritage in 1983 and the new post of 'Curator of Hadrian's Wall Museums' was created This position was filled briefly by John Dore (1983–1986), Sally Dumner and then Bill Hubbard. Georgina Plowright held the position from 1987 until her retirement in 2012 and was responsible for the refurbishment and re-display of the museum as well as the production of an electronic catalogue of the collections. Frances McIntosh is the current Curator of Hadrian's Wall and the North East for English Heritage.

== Gallery ==
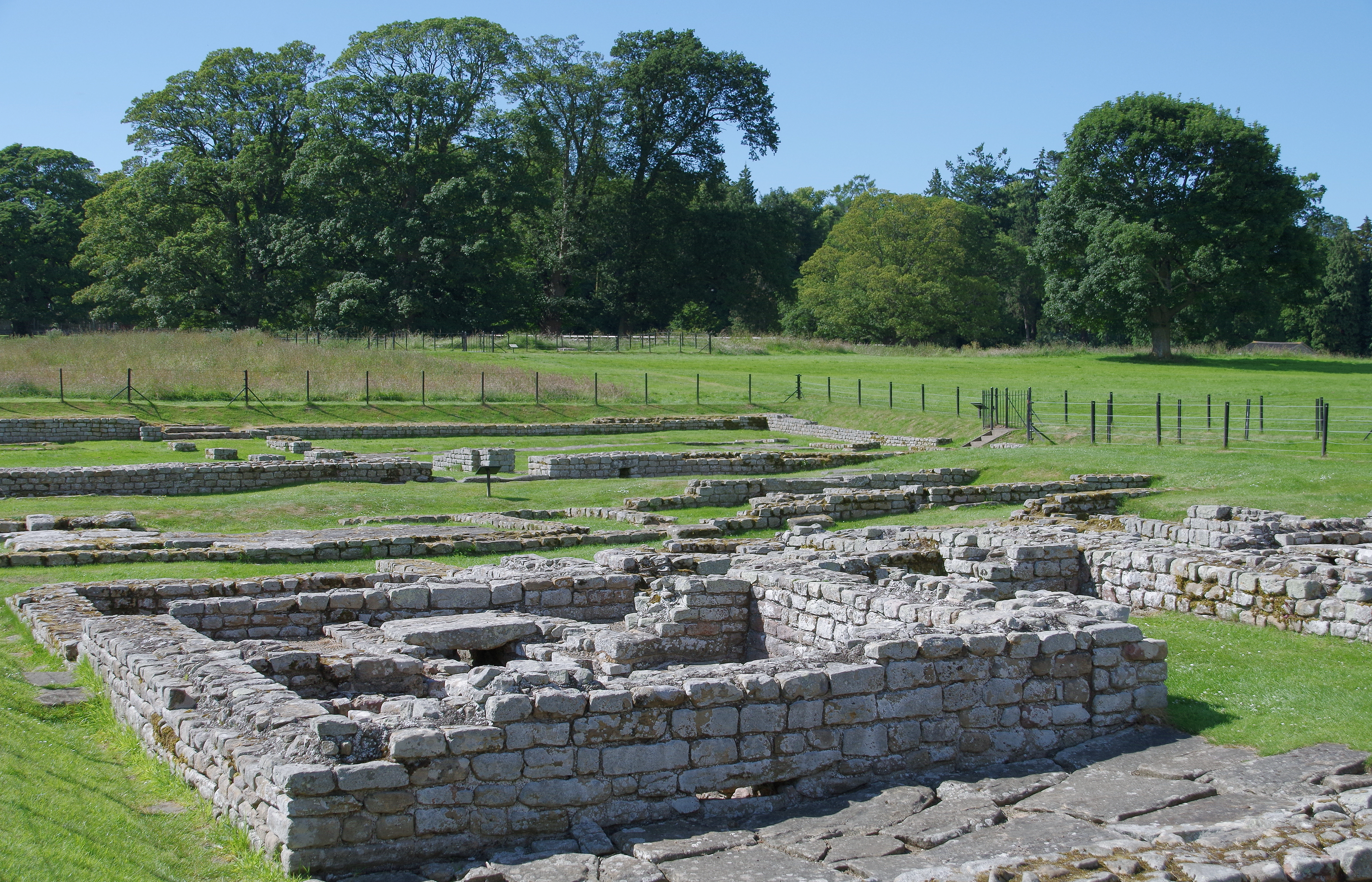
Commandant's house (praetorium, foreground) and headquarters (principia, background)

The barracks

The baths

== Sources ==
- Birley, Eric, Chesters Roman Fort Official Guide-book 1960
- Roman Britain
- Historic England. "Museum, grade II* listed (1043022)". National Heritage List for England.
- Chesters Roman Fort and Museum - Hadrian's Wall - official site English Heritage
- 'Chesters Roman for: outpost of empire' on Google Arts & Culture
