= Chollerford =

Village in Northumberland, England

Coordinates: 55.030°N 2.128°W

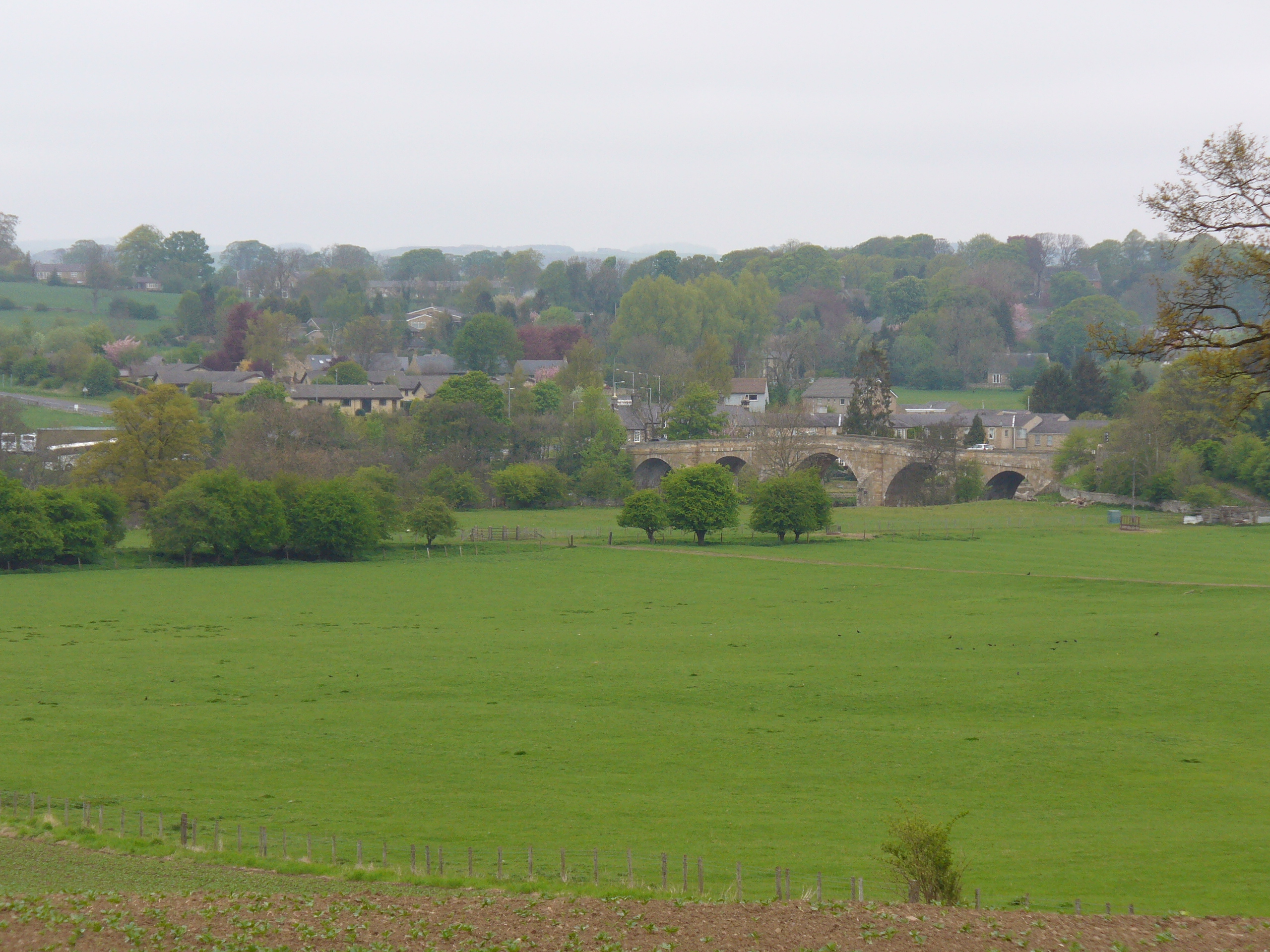
- View of Chollerford from the east

- Location within Northumberland
- OS grid reference: NY918706
- Civil parish: Humshaugh
- Unitary authority: Northumberland
- Ceremonial county: Northumberland
- Region: North East
- Country: England
- Sovereign state: United Kingdom
- Post town: HEXHAM
- Postcode district: NE46
- Dialling code: 01434
- Police: Northumbria
- Fire: Northumberland
- Ambulance: North East
- UK Parliament: Hexham

Chollerford is a village in Northumberland, England, approximately four miles (seven km) north of Hexham (via the A6079 road) on the B6318, the Military Road, not far from Hadrian's Wall. There is a roundabout in the village where the B6318 and B6320 roads meet and the traffic light-controlled Chollerford Bridge crosses the River North Tyne. Beside the river is The George Hotel.

== History ==
The Battle of Heavenfield was fought nearby in 633 or 634 between a Northumbrian army under Oswald of Bernicia and a Welsh army under Cadwallon ap Cadfan of Gwynedd. The battle is commemorated by a stone cross at the side of the B6318. GoogleMap

== Governance ==
Chollerford is in the parliamentary constituency of Hexham. Joe Morris of the Labour Party is the Member of Parliament.

Before Brexit European Parliament voters elected MEPs for the North East England constituency.

For Local Government purposes, it is served by Northumberland County Council, a unitary authority.

== Transport ==
Chollerford was served by Humshaugh railway station (renamed from Chollerford in 1919) on the Border Counties Railway, which linked the Newcastle and Carlisle Railway, near Hexham, with the Border Union Railway at Riccarton Junction. The first section of the route was opened between Hexham and Chollerford in 1858 and the remainder in 1862. The line was closed to passengers by British Railways in 1956.

The station is now a private house.

== See also ==
- Chollerford Bridge
