= Allolee to Walltown =

Scientific site in England

- Site of Special Scientific Interest
- Location within Northumberland
- Location of Allolee to Walltown.
- Area of search: Northumberland
- Grid reference: NY686669
- Coordinates: 54.99581°N 2.49037°W
- Interest: Biological
- Area: 33.9 hectares (84 acres)
- Notification date: 1991
- Location map: DEFRA MAGIC map

Allolee to Walltown is the name given to a Site of Special Scientific Interest (SSSI) in Northumberland, England. The site, which follows the path of a section of Hadrian's Wall, is notable for an unusually wide range of grassland types growing on thin soil above the Whin Sill, a rock formation peculiar to the Northern Pennines.

== Location and natural features ==
Allolee to Walltown is situated in the north-east of England, some 1.6 miles (2.6 km) east-north-east of Greenhead and 2.2 miles (3.5 km) north-north-west of Haltwhistle. It is an east–west corridor of land straddling Hadrian's Wall for a distance of 1 mile (1.6 km) between Milecastle 45 (Walltown) to the west, and Turret 43B in the east, just short of the fort of Aesica (Great Chesters). Milecastle 44 (Allolee) is found at approximately the middle point of the east-west SSSI site.

The site is situated on the Whin Sill, igneous rock dolerite found in County Durham and Northumberland, which outcrops as high, rocky cliff lines, and which was used by the builders of Hadrian's Wall to full strategic advantage. The particular rock of the Winn Sill gives rise to conditions less acidic than comparable types, and the overlying soil is thin and peaty; it provides a habitat for glasses than tolerate dry conditions, notably wild chives (Allium schoenoprasum), rare in Northumberland other than on the Whin Sill.

=== Vegetation ===
Besides wilc chives, the thin soil of the site supports biting stonecrop (Sedum acre), hairy stonecrop (S. villosum), wild thyme (Thymus praecox), parsley piert (Aphanes arvensis), common whitlow-grass (Erophila verna), early hair-grass (Aira praecox), annual knawel (Sceleranthus annuus), rue-leaved saxifrage (Saxifraga tridactylites) and long-stalked cranesbill (Geranium columbinum).

Grassland surrounding drier areas is composed of red fescue (Festuca rubra), common bent (Agrostis capillaris), sweet vernal-grass (Anthoxanthum odoratum), crested dog's-tail (Cynosurus cristatus) and heath grass (Danthonia decumbens). Crags and north-facing scarp slopes support bilberry (Vaccinium myrtillus) and heather (Calluna vulgaris), fir clubmoss (Lycopodium selago) and parsley fern (Cryptogramma crispa). Green spleenwort (Asplenium viride) is found on limestone outcrops.

More calcareous areas support a herb-rich grassland with meadow oat-grass (Avenula pratensis), quaking grass (Briza media), dyer's greenweed (Genista tinctoria), common rock-rose (Helianthemum nummularium), greater burnet (Sanguisorba officinalis) and salad burnet (S. minor).

On unit of the site, a dip slope east of Allolee has poor drainage, which supports a 'most unusual' species-rich grassland dominated by purple moor-grass (Molinia caerulea) and having quaking grass, meadow oat-grass, spring sedge (Carex caryophyllea), glaucous sedge (C. flacca), tawny sedge (C. hostiana), flea sedge (C. pulicaris), lady's mantle (Alchemilla filicaulis), lady's bedstraw (Galium verum), fairy flax (Linum catharticum), cowslip (Primula veris), devil's-bit scabious (Succisa pratensis), greater burnet and wild thyme.

== See also ==
- List of Sites of Special Scientific Interest in Northumberland
