= Four Stones (disambiguation) =

Four Stones or Fourstones may refer to:

- A former name of Duddo Five Stones, a stone circle in Northumberland, England
- Fourstones, a village in Northumberland, England
  - Fourstones railway station, Northumberland, England
- Four Stones for Kanemitsu, a 1973 American short documentary
- The Great Stone of Fourstones, a glacial deposit on the Lancashire/North Yorkshire border, England

== See also ==
- Fhourstones, a computer science benchmark
