= Milecastle 44 =

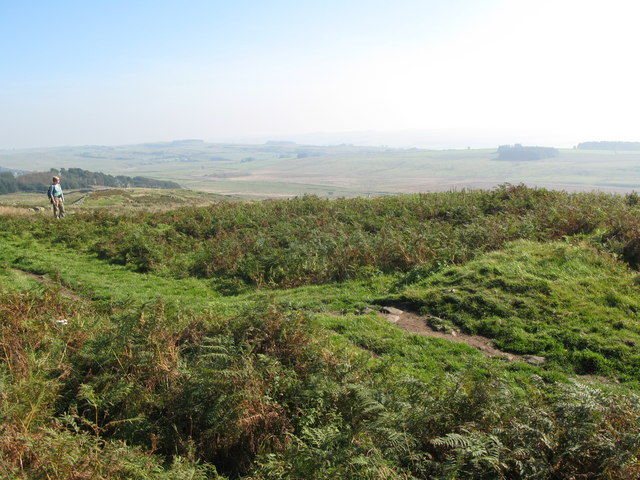
- The site of Milecastle 44

- Location within Northumberland
- 54.996104°N 2.487884°W
- Type: Milecastle
- Location: Northumberland, England

Milecastle 44 (Allolee) was a milecastle on Hadrian's Wall (grid reference NY68886694).

== Description ==
Milecastle 44 is located about 1.5 kilometres (0.93 miles) west of the Great Chesters fort (Aesica). The milecastle survives as a small number of visible facing stones, and a turf-covered bank. The bank measures 3.5 metres (11 ft) wide and 0.9 metres (3.0 ft) high. It is a long-axis type measuring 20.3 metres (67 ft) north-south by 17.0 metres (55.8 ft) east-west internally. An excavation was made by trenching around the inner face, but no published report is available. The agger of the road leading to the milecastle from the Military Way is visible, measuring 3.5 metres (11 ft) wide and 0.2 metres (7.9 in) high.

== Excavations ==
It was excavated by trenching around the inner face, but the original excavators are unknown. It is now visible as a few facing stones and a turf-covered bank, 3.5 metres wide and 0.9 metres high. The agger of the road that leads to the Military Way is 3.5 metres wide and 0.2 metres high.

== Associated turrets ==
Each milecastle on Hadrian's Wall had two associated turret structures. These turrets were positioned approximately one-third and two-thirds of a Roman mile to the west of the Milecastle, and would probably have been manned by part of the milecastle's garrison. The turrets associated with Milecastle 44 are known as Turret 44A and Turret 44B.

=== Turret 44A ===
Turret 44A (Allolee West) (grid reference NY68426685) was located by exploratory excavation in 1912. The turret is visible as a square turf-covered bank, 30 centimetres high.

=== Turret 44B ===
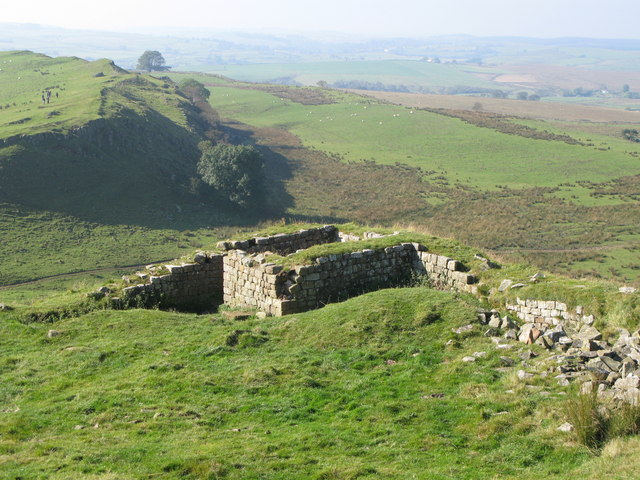
Turret 44B

Turret 44B (Mucklebank) (grid reference NY68146670) was excavated in 1892 and left exposed. The excavations yielded a coin of Valens, and outside the southeast corner, a centurial stone, inscribed "Coh Ic Flau Cve". The turret is visible as consolidated masonry with a maximum height of 1.9 metres.

== Public access ==
The remains of the milecastle, the site of Turret 44A, and the remains of Turret 44B, are all accessible via the Hadrian's Wall Path

== See also ==
- Allolee to Walltown SSSI
