= Milecastle 45 =

Historic site in Northumberland, England

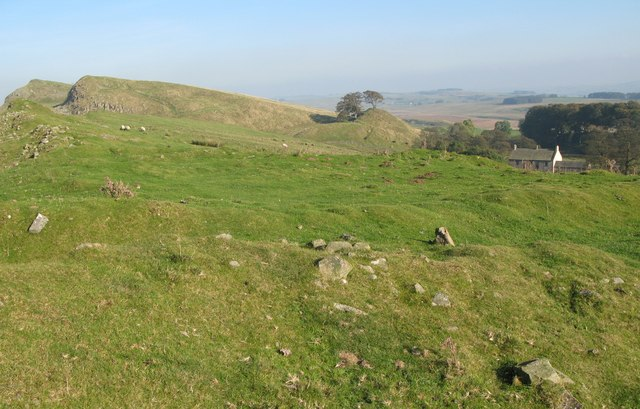
- The site of Milecastle 45

- Location within Northumberland
- 54.992705°N 2.50613°W
- Type: Milecastle
- Location: Northumberland, England

Milecastle 45 (Walltown) was a milecastle on Hadrian's Wall (grid reference NY67716657).

== Description ==
Milecastle 45 is located on the top of Walltown Crags. The walls have been comprehensively robbed, and little remains but the robber trenches and turf-covered spoil mounds. The site is clearly visible as earthworks on aerial photographs.

== Associated turrets ==
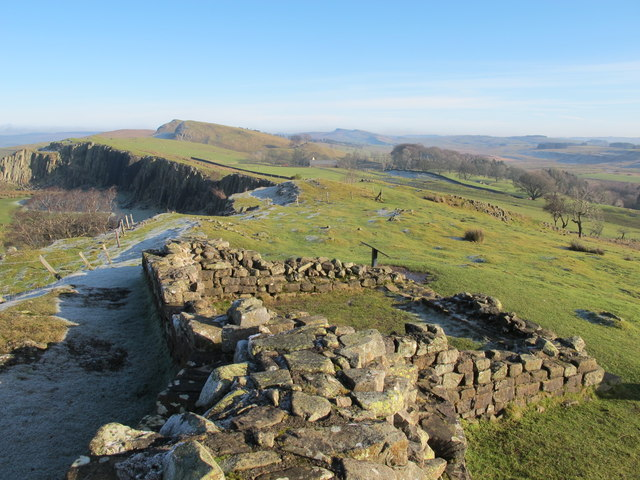
Turret 45A

Each milecastle on Hadrian's Wall had two associated turret structures. These turrets were positioned approximately one-third and two-thirds of a Roman mile to the west of the Milecastle, and would probably have been manned by part of the milecastle's garrison. The turrets associated with Milecastle 45 are known as Turret 45A and Turret 45B.

=== Turret 45A ===
Turret 45A (Walltown) (grid reference NY67406634) is located 90 metres (98 yd) east of the normal measured position, and measures 5.8 metres (19 ft) by 5.5 metres (18 ft) externally. It was excavated in 1883, 1912, and 1959. The 1959 excavations uncovered two centurial stones to the west of the turret. The turret walls were consolidated and stand to an average height of 1 metre. The turret was constructed without wing walls, with the curtain wall abutting the structure, rather than being bonded with it. Because of this, it is believed that the turret was originally a freestanding structure, predating the wall, and probably built as part of a system of watchtowers associated with the Stanegate.

=== Turret 45B ===
Turret 45B (Walltown West) (grid reference NY66956607) was excavated in 1883. It measured 3.8 by 4 metres, with walls just under 1 metre thick and just over 1 metre high. The turret was destroyed soon after 1883 by the operations of the Greenland Quarry.

== Public access ==
The remains of the milecastle and Turret 45A are both accessible via the Hadrian's Wall Path. Parking is available at Walltown Quarry Car Park, which is on the line of the Hadrian's Wall Path, however a steep climb is required to reach the sites. The car park is signposted from the B6318 (Military Road).

== See also ==
- Allolee to Walltown SSSI
