= Milefortlet 9 =

Milefortlet of the Roman Cumbrian Coast defences

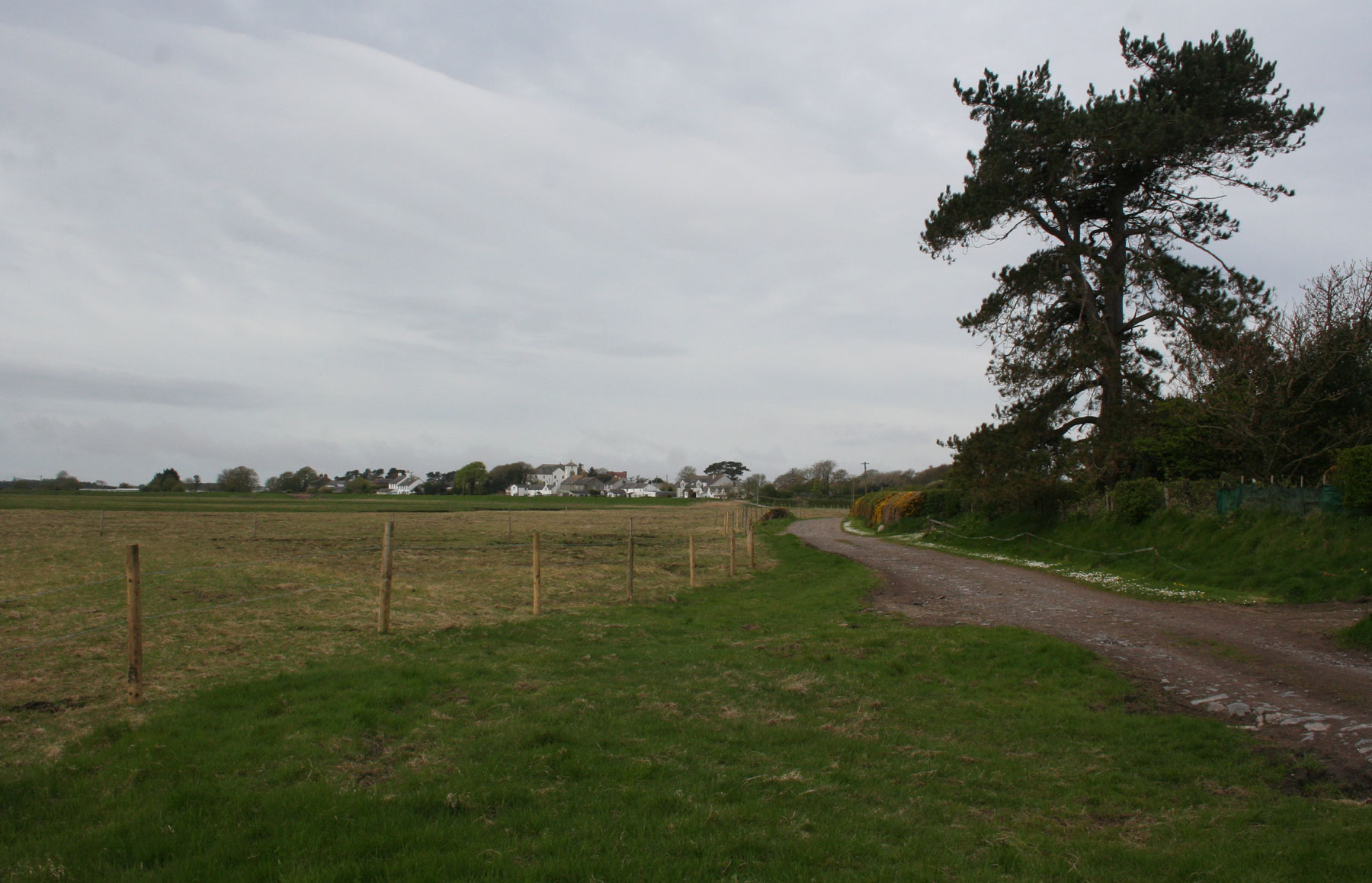
- View looking towards Skinburness, and towards the site of Milefortlet 9

- Location within the former Allerdale Borough Location within Cumbria
- 54.892341°N 3.358803°W
- Type: Milecastle
- Location: Cumbria, England

Milefortlet 9 (Skinburness) was a Milefortlet of the Roman Cumbrian Coast defences. These milefortlets and intervening stone watchtowers extended from the western end of Hadrian's Wall, along the Cumbrian coast and were linked by a wooden palisade. They were contemporary with defensive structures on Hadrian's Wall. There is little to see on the ground but Milefortlet 9 has been located on aerial photographs.

== Description ==
Milefortlet 9 is situated in a field northeast of the village of Skinburness, in the civil parish of Silloth. The outline of the milefortlet was seen on aerial photographs in 1949. These show that the fortlet has external dimensions of approximately 65 metres by 61 metres with traces of a possible outer ditch. Various pits, ditches and maculae are visible close to this fortlet as cropmarks on air photographs, but it is not clear if any relate to it. A portion of an inscribed Roman altar, dedicated to the Matres was found in the summer of 1866 lying on the seashore close to this site, and is now in the British Museum.

The coastline to the north is interrupted by Moricambe Bay, and the next known fort is Milefortlet 5. Milefortlets 8, 7 and 6 were once thought to have been eroded by Moricambe, but there is in fact no evidence that the sites ever existed, and the system to the north is believed to begin again with Milefortlet 5.

== Associated Towers ==
Each milefortlet had two associated towers, similar in construction to the turrets built along Hadrian's Wall. These towers were positioned approximately one-third and two-thirds of a Roman mile to the west of the Milefortlet, and would probably have been manned by part of the nearest Milefortlet's garrison. The towers associated with Milefortlet 9 are known as Tower 9A (grid reference NY12605583) and Tower 9B (grid reference NY12255552). The locations of both towers are uncertain, and their positions have been estimated by measurement to adjoining Roman frontier works. Both sites have been built over.
