= Fourstones railway station =

Disused railway station in Northumberland on the Tyne Valley Line

Fourstones
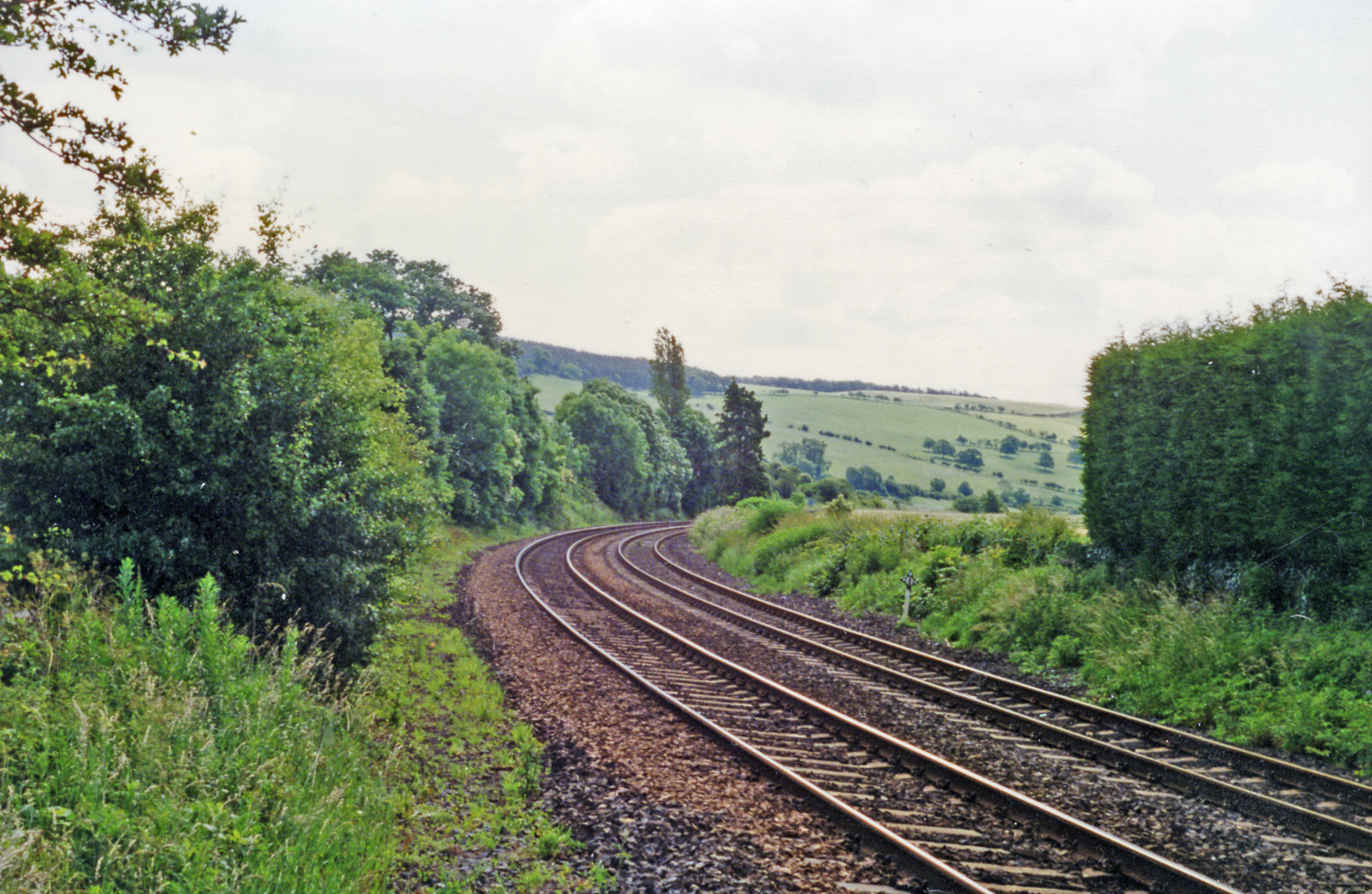

General information
- Location: Fourstones, Northumberland; England
- Coordinates: 55°00′13″N 2°10′23″W
- Grid reference: NY890676
- Platforms: 2
- Tracks: 2

Other information
- Status: Disused

History
- Original company: Newcastle and Carlisle Railway
- Pre-grouping: North Eastern Railway
- Post-grouping: London and North Eastern Railway; British Rail (Eastern Region)

Key dates
- January 1837: Opened
- 2 January 1967: Closed
Location

Fourstones is a former railway station which served the villages of Fourstones and Newbrough in Northumberland between 1837 and 1967 on the Tyne Valley Line.

== History ==
The station opened in January 1837 by the Newcastle and Carlisle Railway. It was closed to both passengers and goods traffic on 2 January 1967.

Preceding station	Historical railways	Following station
Hexham	North Eastern Railway; Newcastle and Carlisle Railway	Haydon Bridge
