= Milefortlet 5 =

Milefortlet of the Roman Cumbrian Coast defences

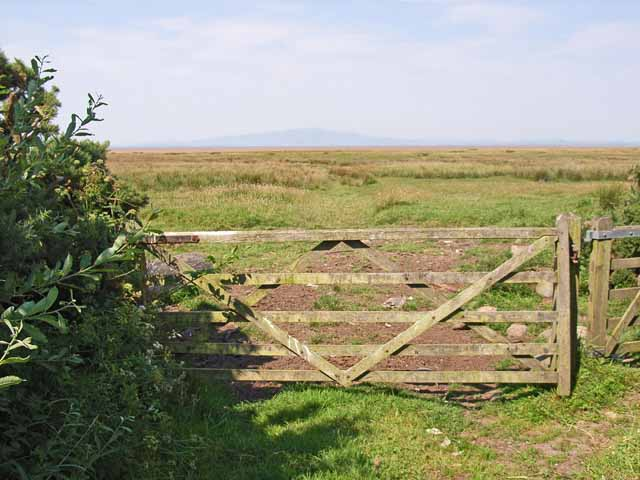
- View over the Solway marshes, north of the site of Milefortlet 5

- Location within Cumbria
- 54.913343°N 3.29555°W
- Type: Milecastle
- Location: Cumbria, England

Milefortlet 5 (Cardurnock) was a Milefortlet of the Roman Cumbrian Coast defences. These milefortlets and intervening stone watchtowers extended from the western end of Hadrian's Wall, along the Cumbrian coast and were linked by a wooden palisade. They were contemporary with defensive structures on Hadrian's Wall. The remains of Milefortlet 5 was excavated in 1943-4 prior to its destruction in 1944.

== Description ==
Milefortlet 5 was situated in a field just south of the hamlet of Cardurnock in the civil parish of Bowness. The site lies within a disused wartime airfield, now under pasture. There is nothing to see on the ground, but aerial photographs taken in 2006 show the cropmarks of the northern end of the milefortlet.

The coastline to the south is interrupted by Moricambe Bay, and the next known fort is Milefortlet 9. Milefortlets 6, 7 and 8 were once thought to have been eroded by Moricambe, but there is in fact no evidence that the sites ever existed, and the system is believed to begin again with Milefortlet 9.

== Excavations ==
The milefortlet was excavated in 1943-4 prior to the construction of an airfield. Three phases of construction could be traced. Phase 1 dated to the Hadrianic period. Phase 2 dated to the Antonine era, when the size of the milefortlet was reduced. Phase 3 seems to date from the 4th century. In Phase 3 the ramparts were retained but they were refaced on the south, west and north sides, and it seems a stone building in the fortlet was built during this period.

A Roman road has been traced to the southwest of Milefortlet 5, and it was excavated in 1992–3.

== Associated Towers ==
Each milefortlet had two associated towers, similar in construction to the turrets built along Hadrian's Wall. These towers were positioned approximately one-third and two-thirds of a Roman mile to the west of the Milefortlet. However the coastline at this point is interrupted by Moricambe Bay, and any additional towers are purely conjectural.
