= Milefortlet 4 =

Milefortlet of the Roman Cumbrian Coast defences

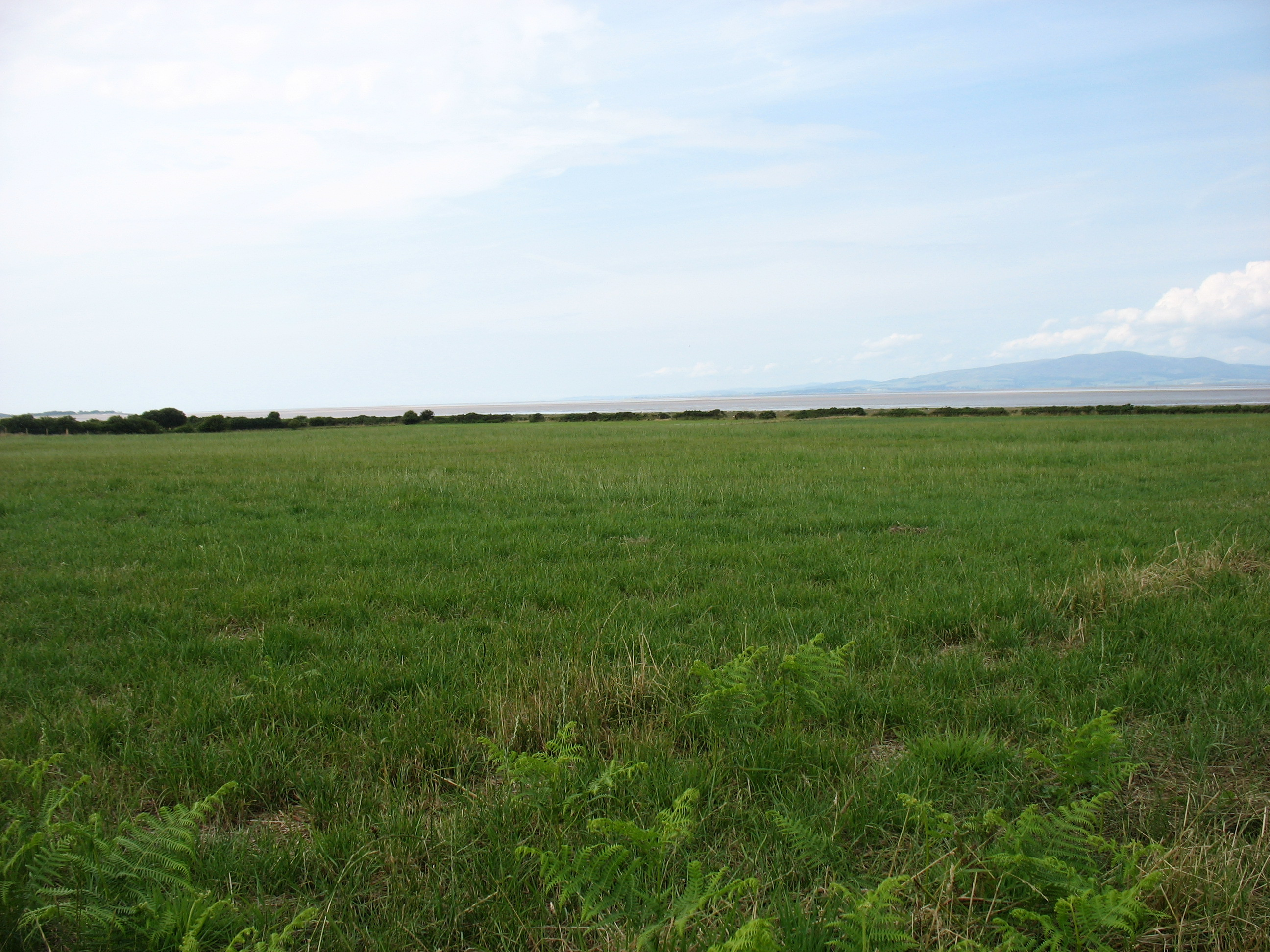
- Fields by the Solway Firth, and the approximate site of Milefortlet 4

- Location within Cumbria
- 54.926352°N 3.289258°W
- Type: Milecastle
- Location: Cumbria, England

Milefortlet 4 (Herd Hill) was a Milefortlet of the Roman Cumbrian Coast defences. These milefortlets and intervening stone watchtowers extended from the western end of Hadrian's Wall, along the Cumbrian coast and were linked by a wooden palisade. They were contemporary with defensive structures on Hadrian's Wall. There is little to see on the ground but Milefortlet 4 has been located by archaeologists.

== Description ==
Milefortlet 4 is situated at the seaward edge of a low ridge, just north of the hamlet of Cardurnock in the civil parish of Bowness. It was located in 1945 by the finding of turfwork on Herd Hill. There is nothing to see from the ground but a geophysical survey of the site was undertaken in 1994 and the precise position of the milefortlet was located.

== Associated Towers ==
Each milefortlet had two associated towers, similar in construction to the turrets built along Hadrian's Wall. These towers were positioned approximately one-third and two-thirds of a Roman mile to the west of the Milefortlet, and would probably have been manned by part of the nearest Milefortlet's garrison. The towers associated with Milefortlet 4 are known as Tower 4A (grid reference NY172594) and Tower 4B (grid reference NY17115888).

The position of Tower 4A is uncertain, although it thought to lie on the crest of a ridge with good views seaward. Tower 4B is located in a field west of Cardurnock. It was excavated by in 1977, which located three sides of the tower surviving as robber trenches: the western side having been completely eroded. The tower was interpreted as having had three phases: in the first two phases palisade structures were built, but in the third phase these were abandoned and a stone tower was built.
