= Newbrough Town Hall =

Municipal building in Newbrough, Northumberland, England

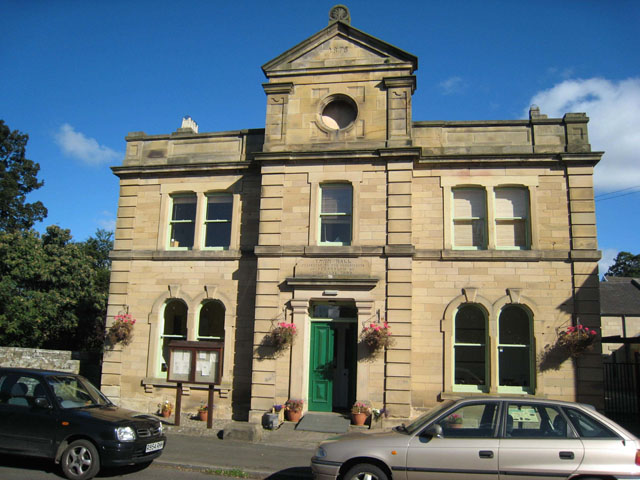
- Newbrough Town Hall

- Shown in Northumberland
- 55.0055°N 2.1985°W
- Location: Stanegate, Newbrough

History
- Built: 1878

Site notes
- Architectural style: Italianate style

Listed Building – Grade II
- Official name: Town Hall
- Designated: 12 February 1985
- Reference no.: 1303483

Newbrough Town Hall is a municipal building in Stanegate in Newbrough, Northumberland, England. The building, which is used as a community events venue, is a Grade II listed building.

== History ==
The building was commissioned by Jane Todd of Newbrough Park as a gift to the people of Newbrough: she had inherited some money from her father, Nicholas Todd, who had been the proprietor of the Stonecroft Lead Mine Company until he died in 1863. the site she chose for the building was open land on the opposite side of Stanegate to her own estate.

The foundation stone for the new building was laid by Jane Todd in 1876. It was designed in the Italianate style, built in ashlar stone and was officially opened by William Benson of Allendale Hall on 25 April 1878. The design involved a symmetrical main frontage with three bays facing onto Stanegate. The central bay, which slightly projected forward, featured a doorway flanked by Tuscan order pilasters supporting an entablature and the foundation stone, with a sash window with an architrave on the first floor. The outer bays were fenestrated by pairs of round headed windows with architraves and keystones on the ground floor, and by pairs of square headed sash windows with architraves on the first floor. At roof level, there was a parapet, broken by a central panel which contained a clock and was surmounted by a pediment with an acroterion. Internally, the principal room was the main assembly hall which stretched out to the rear.

A memorial, in the form of a simple cross designed and sculpted by Beattie & Co of Carlisle and intended to commemorate the lives of local service personnel who had died in the First World War, was unveiled to the immediate west of the town hall in 1920. During the Second World War, a local sailor, Andrew Charlton, was presented with a stainless steel watch at the town hall to commemorate his role as a stoker on board the cruiser, HMS Ajax, at the Battle of the River Plate, during which the German heavy cruiser Admiral Graf Spee was scuttled in December 1939.

The roof of the building and the caretaker's flat were badly damaged in a serious fire in 1950 but repaired the following year. The adjacent building to the east, which had been funded by public subscription as a mechanics institute in 1848 and enlarged in 1890, and which had then been given to the local Women's Institute in 1948, was presented to the town hall management committee in 1997. An extensive programme of refurbishment works, funded in part by the Millennium Commission, was carried out at both the town hall and the Women's Institute building in 1998. The Women's Institute building was converted into a hostel for tourists and cyclists known as "the Bunkhouse" in 2016, and a concert was held at the town hall to celebrate its 140th anniversary in November 2018.
