= Nailwort =

The common name nailwort may refer to several unrelated species:

- Any species of Paronychia (Whitlow-wort)
- Draba verna (Shadflower)
- Saxifraga tridactylites (Rue-leaved Saxifrage)
