= Newbrough Hall =

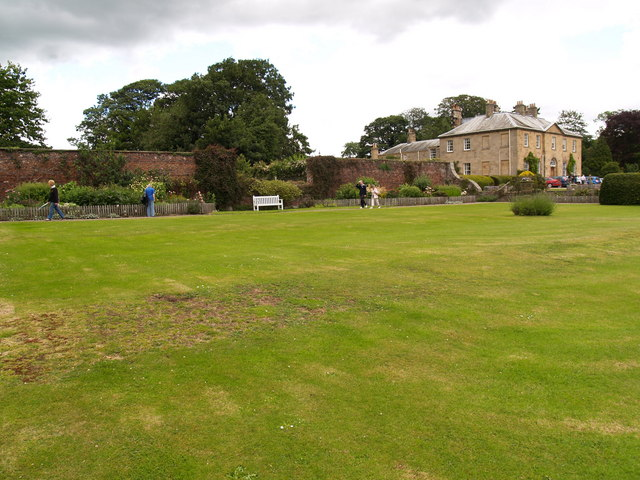
- Newbrough Hall and Garden

- Location in Northumberland

General information
- Location: Northumberland, England
- Coordinates: 55.0055°N 2.1985°W
- OS grid: NY874679

Newbrough Hall is an early 19th-century country house at Newbrough, about 5 miles (8 km) west of Hexham, Northumberland, England. It is a Grade II* listed building.

Newbrough was anciently part of the Manor of Thornton. The medieval tower house known as Thornton Tower was reported to be in a state of decay in a survey in 1541. The Grade II listed building is now completely ruinous.

The estate was held by John Armstrong in 1692 and by John Bacon in the early 18th century. By due descent the property passed to Bacon's great grandson, the Reverend Henry Wastell, in 1811.

Wastell built a new house adjacent to the old tower, to a design by architect John Dobson in 1812. The estate later passed to his daughter and her husband of 1901, Colonel Coulson. They commissioned architect Francis William Deas (1862–1951) to modernise the house in 1902. The resulting two-storey house, with five bays of which the central was pedimented, was extended with two rear wings attached to the 1813 coach house to create a central courtyard. The house was equipped with electricity for which purpose a detached power house was erected in the grounds. (The power house, now a separate dwelling, is Grade II listed).

Coulson's daughter married Walter Benson, High Sheriff of Northumberland in 1917. William Archer Benson was High Sheriff in 1951. The Benson family remained in residence until 1999. The house is occupied by their descendants.
