= Milecastle 43 =

Historic site in England

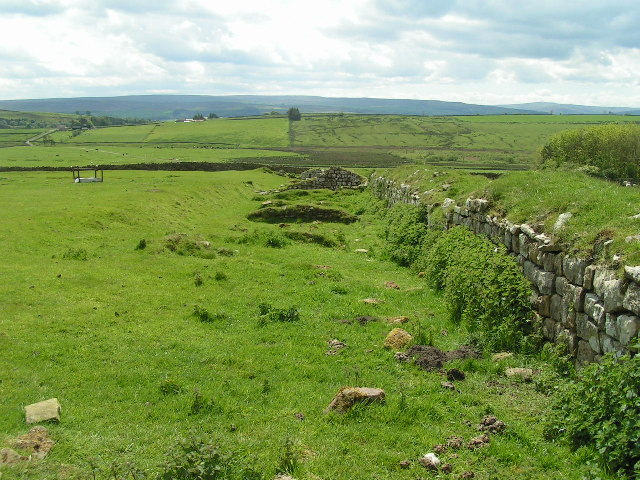
- Milecastle 43 lies beneath the north wall of Great Chesters Fort

- Location within Northumberland
- 54.995296°N 2.464897°W
- Type: Milecastle
- Location: Northumberland, England

Milecastle 43 (Great Chesters) was a milecastle on Hadrian's Wall (grid reference NY70356684). It was obliterated when the fort at Great Chesters (Aesica) was built.

== Description ==
Milecastle 43 was situated at Great Chesters, and was destroyed when the Aesica fort was built.

== Excavations ==
The foundations were discovered during an excavation in 1939, and were found beneath the fort wall and rampart between the north gate and north-west angle of Aesica. The excavations showed that the milecastle had a short axis with a Type I gateway. There are no visible remains.

== Associated turrets ==
Each milecastle on Hadrian's Wall had two associated turret structures. These turrets were positioned approximately one-third and two-thirds of a Roman mile to the west of the Milecastle, and would probably have been manned by part of the milecastle's garrison. The turrets associated with Milecastle 43 are known as Turret 43A and Turret 43B.

=== Turret 43A ===
Turret 43A (Cockmount Hill) (grid reference NY69856684) was located by exploratory excavation in 1912. The site is overlain by turf-covered spoil from the Wall, and no remains of the turret can be seen.

=== Turret 43B ===
Turret 43B (Allolee East) (grid reference NY69356684) was also located by exploratory excavation in 1912. There are no visible remains.

== Public access ==
The Hadrian's Wall Path passes through the remains of Aesica fort close to the location of the milecastle. The sites of both turrets are accessible via the Hadrian's Wall Path.

== See also ==
- Allolee to Walltown SSSI
