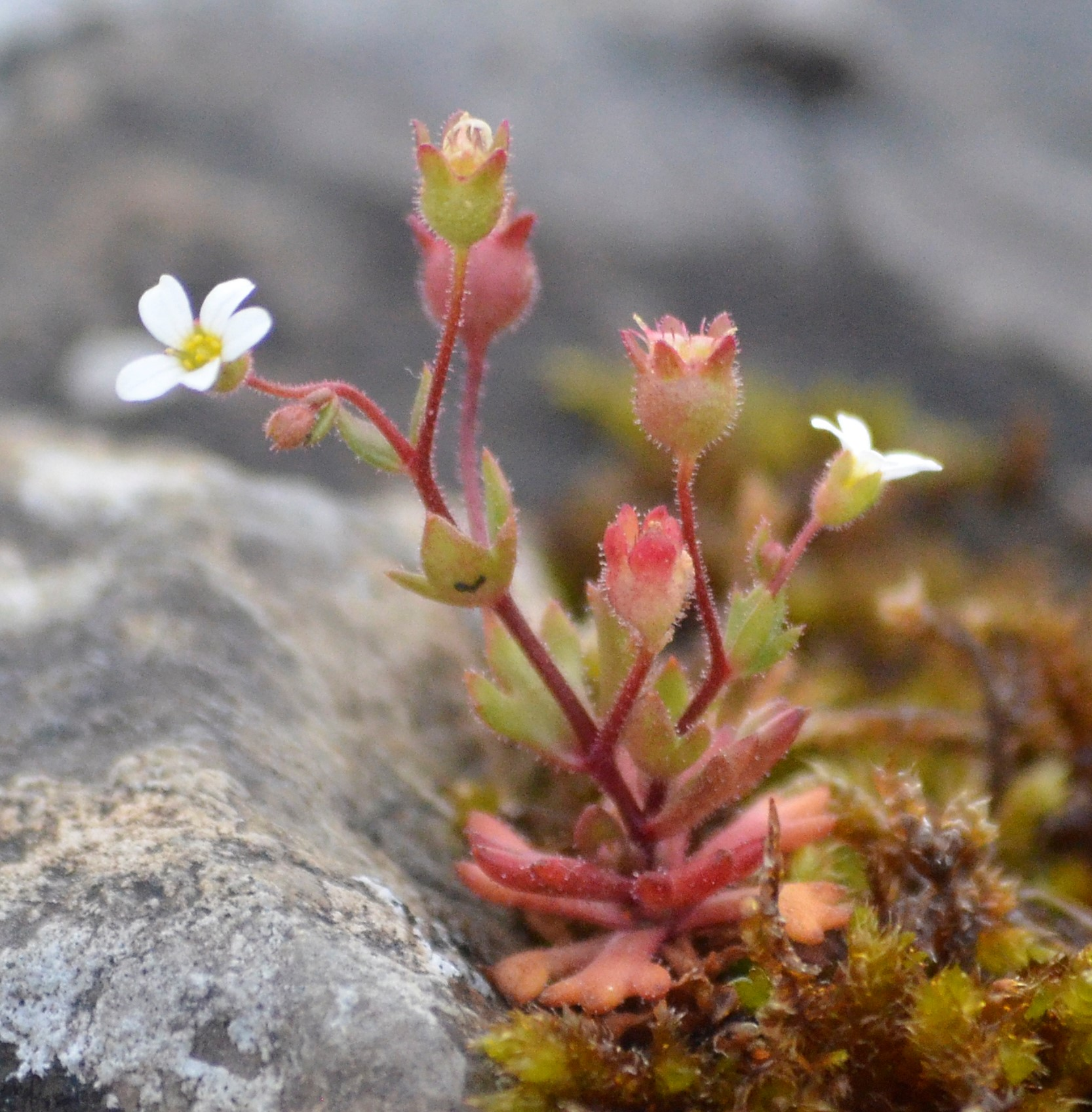

Scientific classification
- Kingdom: Plantae
- Clade: Tracheophytes
- Clade: Angiosperms
- Clade: Eudicots
- Order: Saxifragales
- Family: Saxifragaceae
- Genus: Saxifraga
- Species: S. tridactylites

Binomial name
- Saxifraga tridactylites L.

= Saxifraga tridactylites =

Species of flowering plant

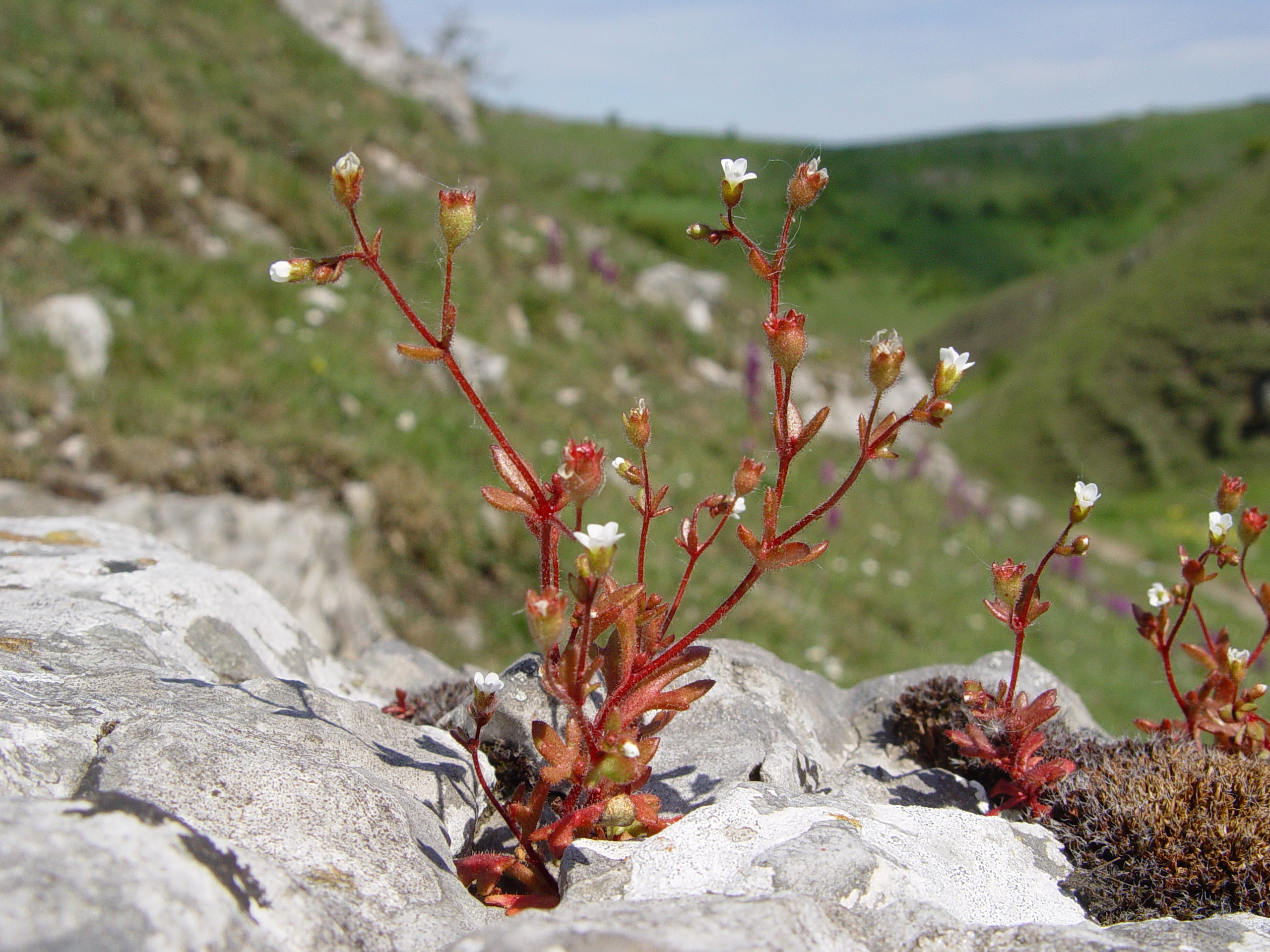
Saxifraga tridactylites on limestone outcrop, Derbyshire, England.

Saxifraga tridactylites, the rue-leaved saxifrage or "nailwort", is a species of plant in the family Saxifragaceae.

Rue-leaved saxifrage is a winter-annual herb with distinctive, trilobed, fleshy leaves and red stems. These stems, the leaves and the sepals are covered in numerous sticky glands. In Great Britain, it is associated with dry, open habitats including sand dune grassland, sandy banks and verges, solution hollows on limestone pavement and rock ledges, cliffs and screes, and old sand- and gravel-pits. It is also often found in urban environments on mortared walls, pavements, churchyards, car parks and railway tracks. It is most commonly found on base-rich substrates, often on skeletal soils or virtually bare rock.
