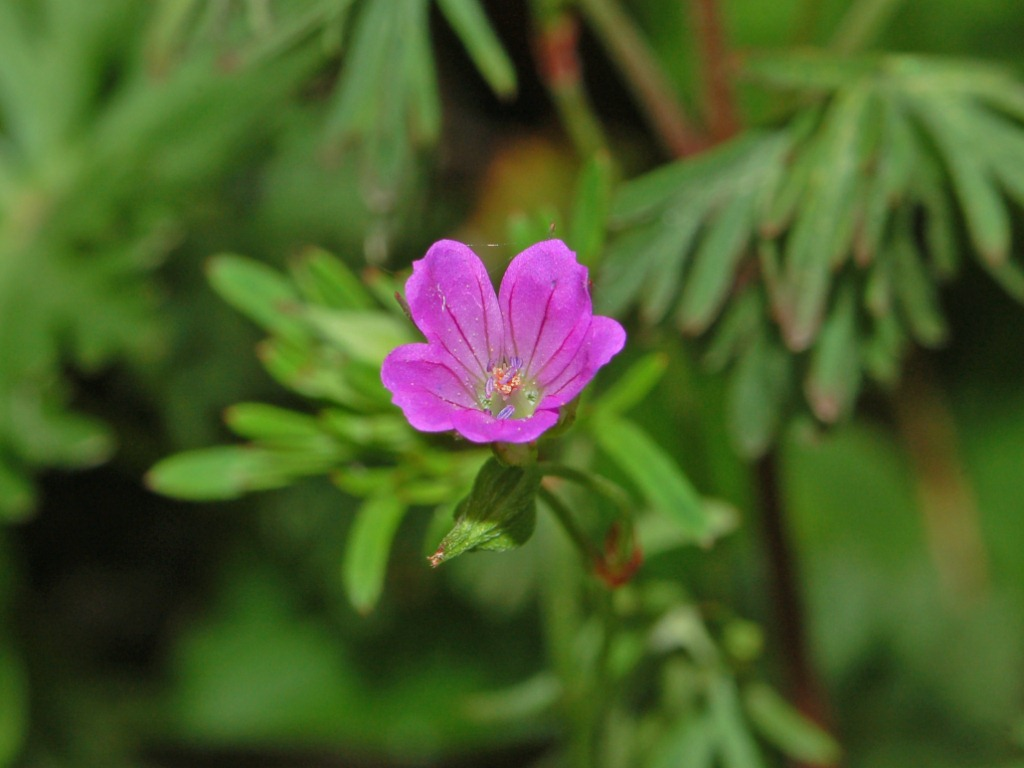

Scientific classification
- Kingdom: Plantae
- Clade: Tracheophytes
- Clade: Angiosperms
- Clade: Eudicots
- Clade: Rosids
- Order: Geraniales
- Family: Geraniaceae
- Genus: Geranium
- Species: G. columbinum

Binomial name
- Geranium columbinum L.

Synonyms
- Geranium malvaceum Burm.f., Geranium gracile Schenk, Geranium diffusum Picard; Geranium pallidum Salisb.

= Geranium columbinum =

Species of flowering plant

Geranium columbinum, common name long-stalked crane's-bill or longstalk cranesbill, is a herbaceous annual plant in the family Geraniaceae.

== Description ==
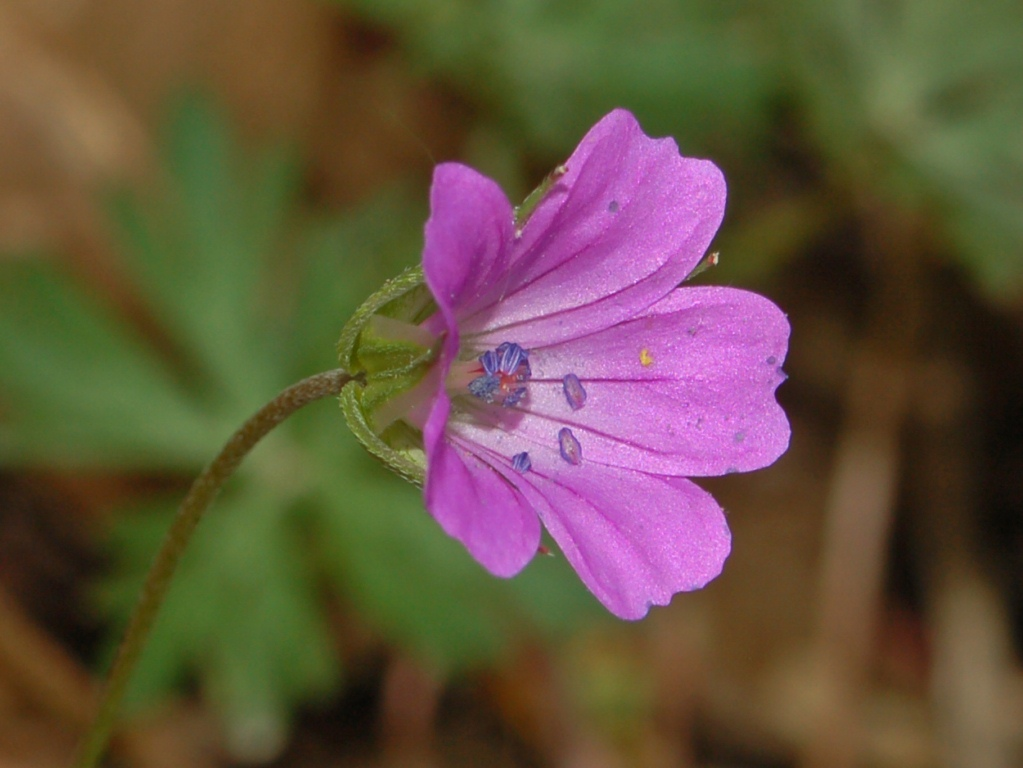
Close-up of a flower of Geranium columbinum

Geranium columbinum reaches on average 15–30 centimetres (5.9–11.8 in) in height, with a maximum of 60 centimetres (24 in). The stem is more or less erect, hairy and quite branched. The leaves are opposite, approximately pentagonal and palmate and the leaf lobes have two to three deep cuts making it similar in shape to a pigeon's foot (hence the Latin epithet columbinus). The flowers are pink to purple, 15–20 millimetres (0.59–0.79 in) in size, with five obovate-heart-shaped petals as long as the sepals. The petals are 7–9 mm long, with distinctive veining. The flowering period extends from March to September. The flowers are hermaphrodite and pollinated by insects (entomogamy).

== Distribution ==
This plant is present throughout Europe, Western Asia and Northern Africa. It has also been introduced into North America.

== Habitat ==
Geranium columbinum prefers moderately dry, nutrient-rich calcareous soils, in woods, hedgerows and roadsides, at an altitude of 0–1,200 metres (0–3,937 ft) above sea level.

== Gallery ==
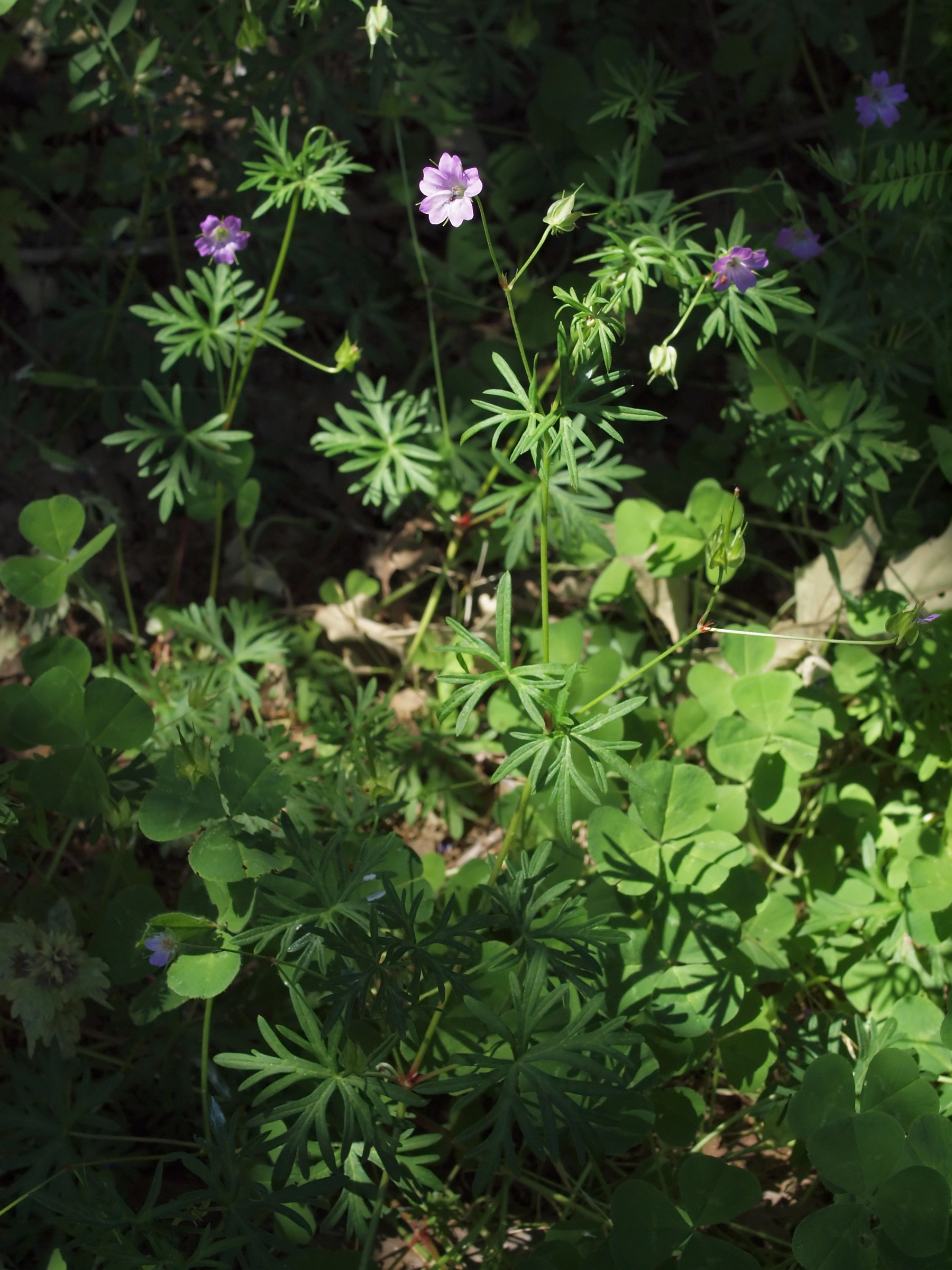
Plant of Geranium columbinum

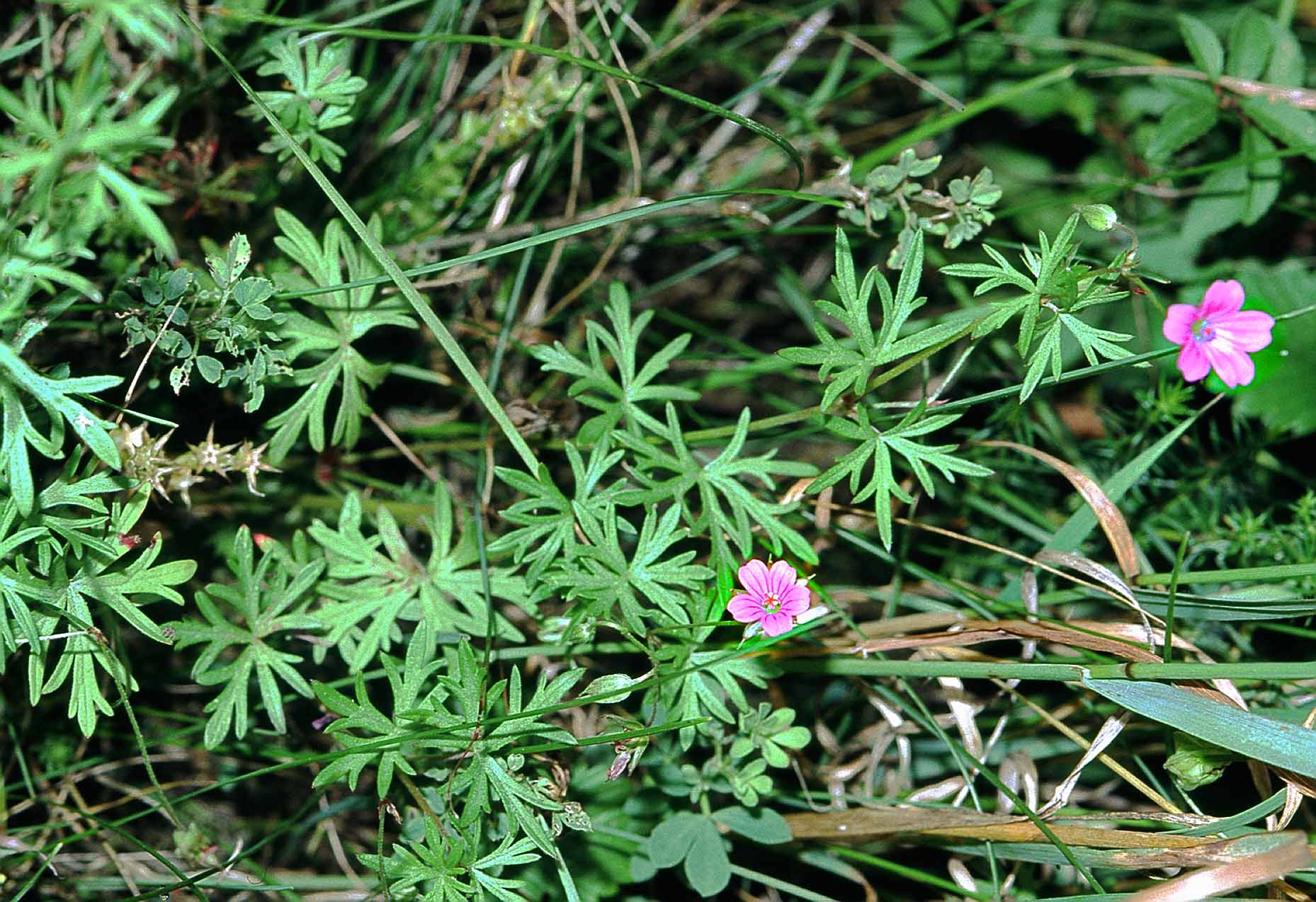
Plant of Geranium columbinum

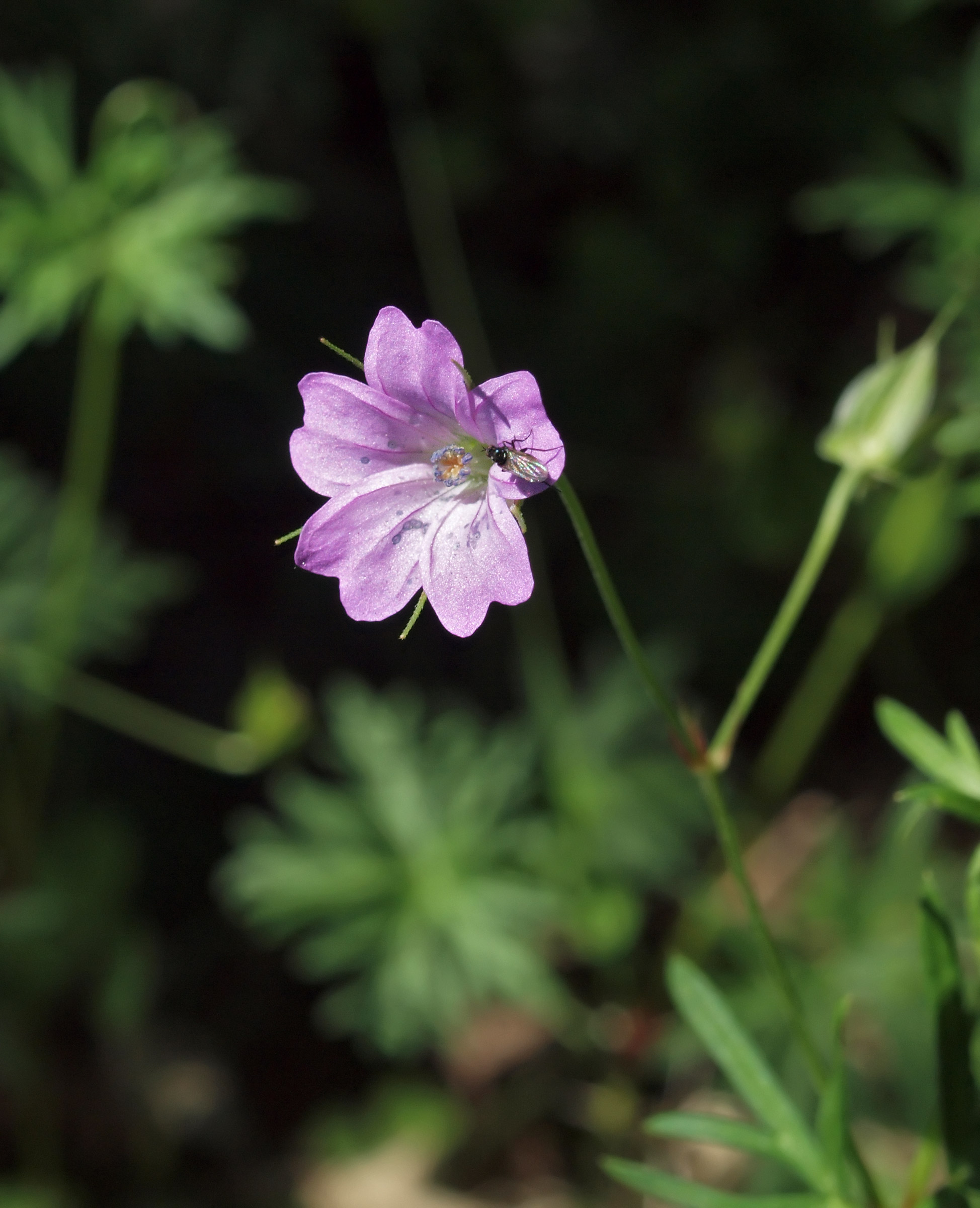
Flower of Geranium columbinum

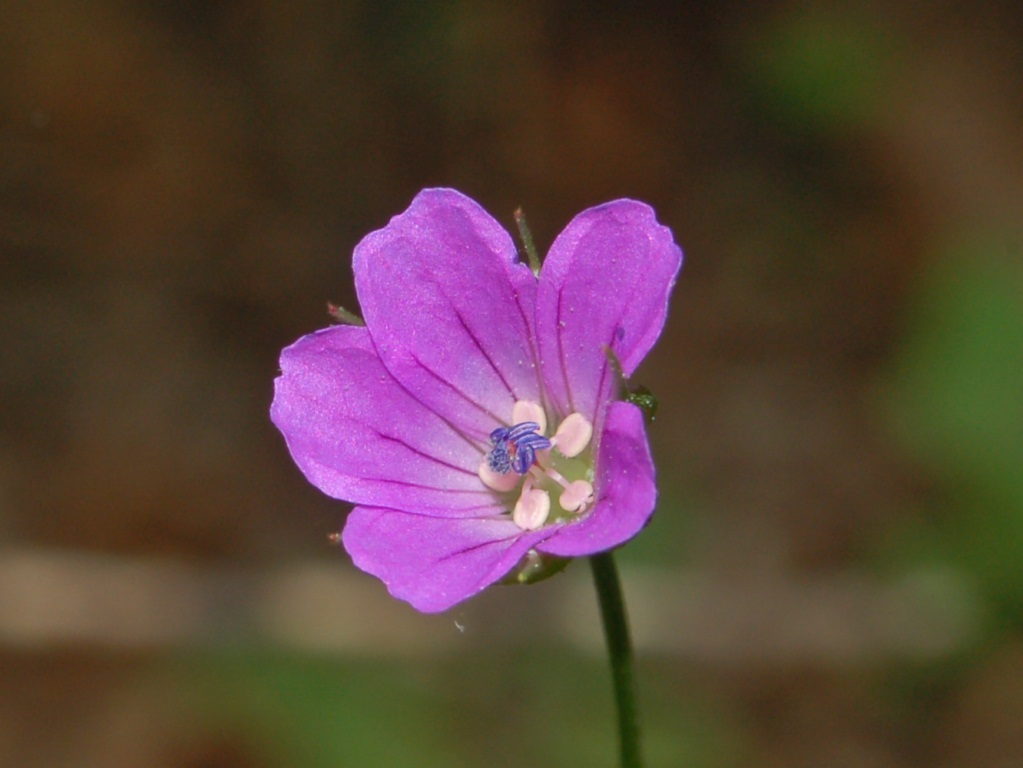
Close-up of a flower of Geranium columbinum

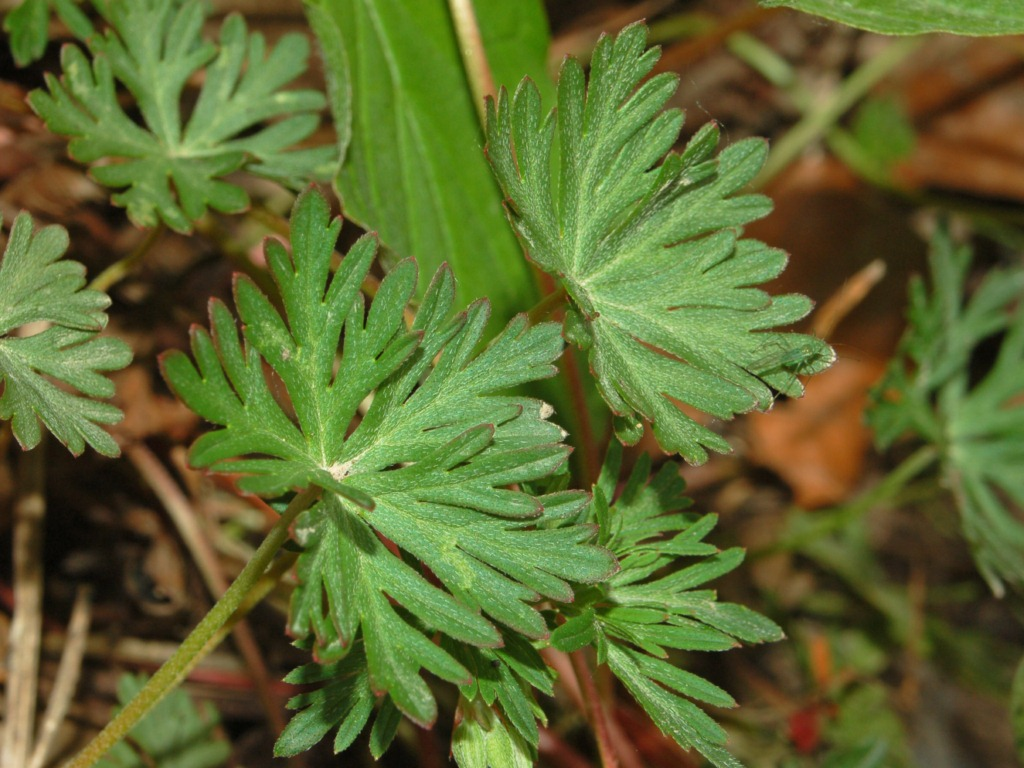
Leaves of Geranium columbinum
