= Stanegate =

Roman road that ran from Carlisle to Corbridge, England

Coordinates: 55.00519°N 2.28266°W

- Roman Road
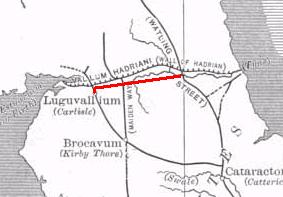
- Route of the Stanegate

Route information
- Length: 38 mi (61 km)
- Time period: Roman Britain
- Margary number: 85

Major junctions
- From: Corstopitum
- Vindolanda, Magnis
- To: Luguvalium

Location
- Country: United Kingdom

Road network
- Roman roads in Britannia

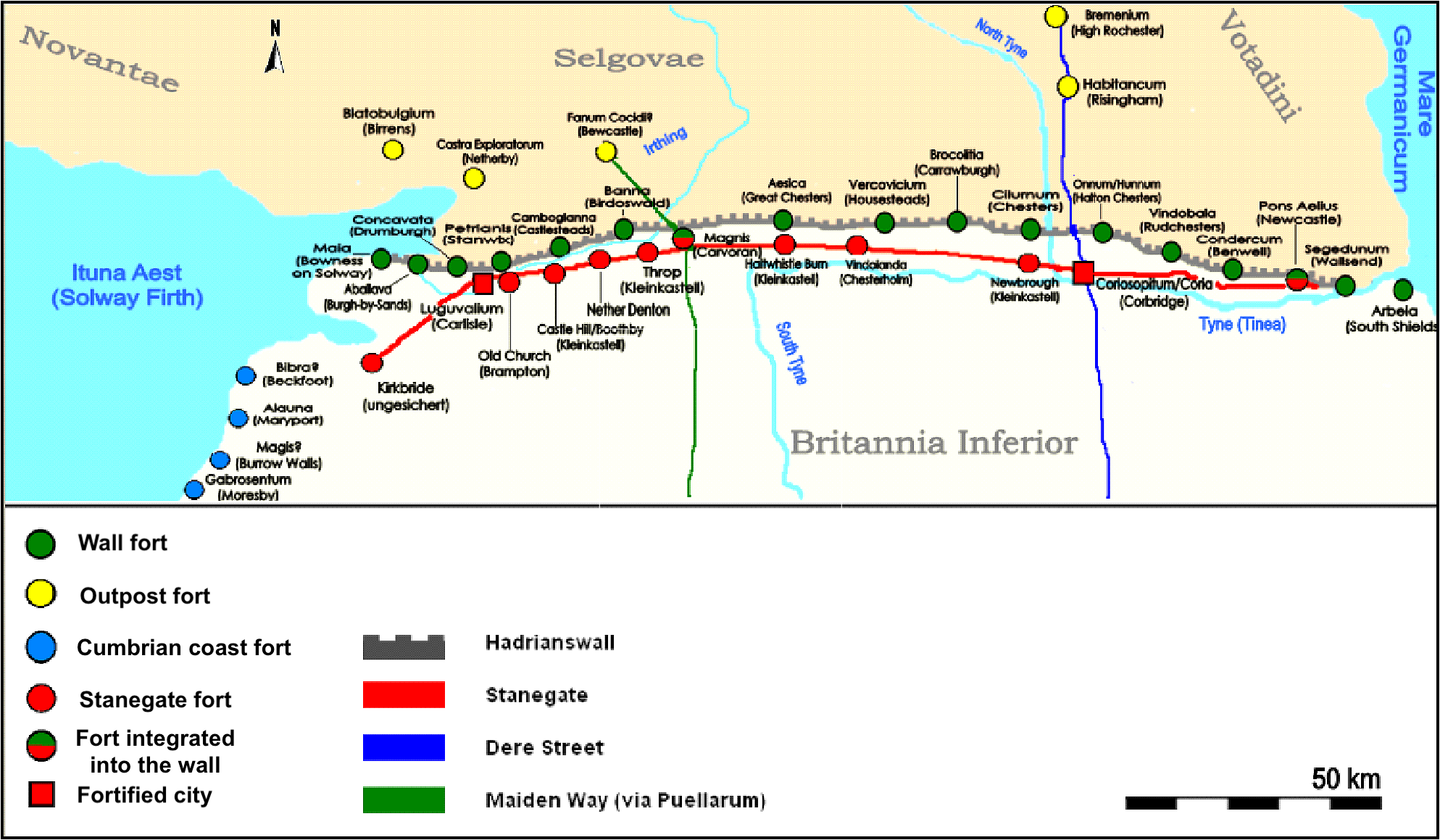
Forts on Stanegate and Hadrian's wall

The Stanegate (meaning "stone road" in Northumbrian dialect) was an important Roman road and early frontier built in what is now northern England. It linked many forts including two that guarded important river crossings: Corstopitum (Corbridge) on the River Tyne in the east (situated on Dere Street) and Luguvalium (Carlisle) on the River Eden in the west. The Stanegate ran through the natural gap formed by the valleys of the River Tyne in Northumberland and the River Irthing in Cumbria. It predated the Hadrian's Wall frontier by several decades; the Wall would later follow a similar route, albeit slightly to the north.

The Stanegate should not be confused with the two Roman roads called Stane Street in the south of England, namely Stane Street (Chichester) and Stane Street (Colchester). In both these cases the meaning is the same as for the northern version, indicating a stone or paved road.

The Stanegate differed from most other Roman roads in that it often followed the easiest gradients, and so tended to weave around, whereas typical Roman roads follow a straight path, even if this sometimes involves having punishing gradients to climb.

A large section of the Stanegate is still in use today as a modern minor road between Fourstones and Vindolanda in Northumberland.

== History ==
The Stanegate is believed to have been built under the governorship of Agricola, from 77 to 85 AD, during the reigns of the emperors Vespasian, Titus, and Domitian. It is also thought that it was built as a strategic road when the northern frontier was on the line of the Forth and Clyde. An indication of this is that it was provided with forts at one-day marching intervals (14 Roman miles or modern 13 miles (21 km)), sufficient for a strategic non-frontier road. The forts at Vindolanda (Chesterholm) and Nether Denton have been shown to date from about the same time as Corstopitum and Luguvalium, in the 70s and 80s AD.

When the Romans decided to withdraw from Scotland starting from around 87 AD, the line of the Stanegate gradually became the new frontier and it became necessary to provide forts at half-day marching intervals. These additional forts were Newbrough, Magnis (Carvoran), and Brampton Old Church. It has been suggested that a series of smaller forts were built in between the 'half-day-march' forts. Haltwhistle Burn and Throp might be such forts, but there is insufficient evidence to confirm a series of such fortlets.

== Structure ==
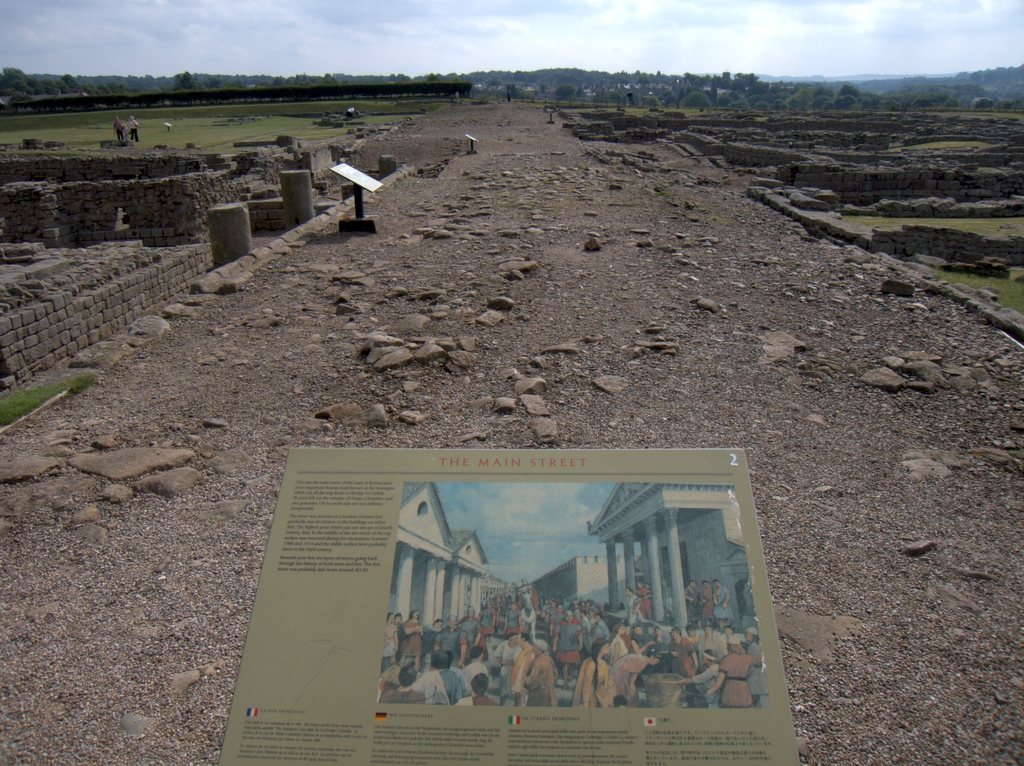
The line of the Stanegate looking east, within the Corbridge Roman Site

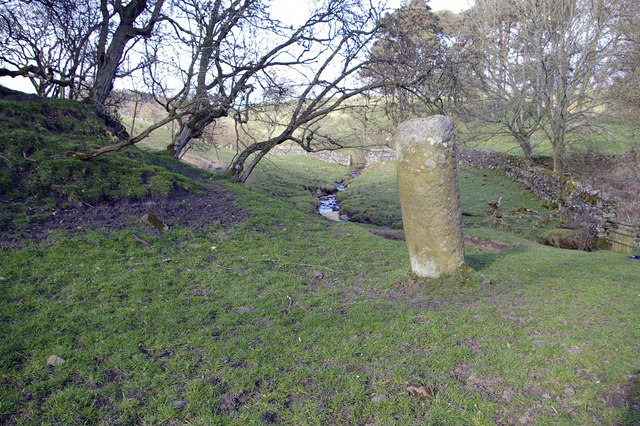
An in situ Roman milestone on the Stanegate adjoining Vindolanda fort

Where it left the base of Corstopitum, the Stanegate was 22 feet (6.7 m) wide with covered stone gutters and a foundation of 6-inch (150 mm; 15 cm) cobbles with 10 inches (250 mm; 25 cm) of gravel on top.

== Route ==
The Stanegate began in the east at Corstopitum, where the important road, Dere Street, headed towards Scotland. West of Corstopitum, the Stanegate crossed the Cor Burn, and then followed the north bank of the Tyne until it reached the North Tyne near the village of Wall. A Roman bridge must have taken the road across the North Tyne, from where it headed west past the present village of Fourstones to Newbrough, where the first fort is situated, 7 1/2 miles (12.1 km) from Corbridge, and 6 miles (9.7 km) from Vindolanda. It is a small fort occupying less than 1 acre (0.40 ha) and is in the graveyard of Newbrough church, which stands alone to the west of the village.

From Newbrough, the Stanegate proceeds west, parallel to the South Tyne until it meets the next major fort at Vindolanda (Chesterholm). From Vindolanda the Stanegate crosses the route of the present-day Military Road and passes just south of the minor fort of Haltwhistle Burn. From Haltwhistle Burn, the Stanegate continues west away from the course of the South Tyne and passes the major fort of Magnis (Carvoran), 6 1/2 miles (10.5 km) from Vindolanda and 20 miles (32 km) from Corstopitum. At this point, the road is joined by the Maiden Way coming from the fort of Epiacum (also known as Whitley Castle) near Alston to the south.

From Magnis, the road turns towards the southwest to follow the course of the River Irthing, passing the minor fort of Throp, and arriving at the major fort of Nether Denton, 4 1/2 miles (7.2 km) from Magnis and 24 1/2 miles (39.4 km) from Corstopitum. The fort occupies an area of about 3 acres (1.2 ha).

From Nether Denton, the road continues to follow the River Irthing and heads towards present-day Brampton. It passes the minor fort of Castle Hill Boothby and then, 1 mile (1.6 km) west of Brampton, reaches the next major fort, that of Brampton Old Church, 6 miles (9.7 km) from Nether Denton and 30 1/2 miles (49.1 km) from Corstopitum. The fort is so called because half of it is buried under Old St Martin's church and its graveyard.

From Brampton Old Church, the road crosses the River Irthing and continues southwest through Irthington and passes through what is now the site of Carlisle Airport, just to the north of the main runway. The curving corner of an associated marching camp can be made out from the air on the south edge of the runway near its western end, and can be seen on Google Earth. The Stanegate then continued through a large cutting in the village of Crosby-on-Eden, where a small fort has been postulated, based on marching distances, but has not yet been found. The Stanegate then crossed the River Eden near the cricket ground in modern Carlisle and eventually reached the fort of Luguvalium (Carlisle) on the site of Carlisle Castle, 7 1/2 miles (12.1 km) from Brampton Old Church and 38 miles (61 km) from Corstopitum. LIDAR images show that the road carried on westwards for a further 4 1/2 miles (7.2 km) to the Roman fort at Kirkbride overlooking Moricambe Bay, an inlet of the Solway Firth, where a large camp of 5 acres (2.0 ha) was found.

The Stanegate might have run eastwards from Corstopitum towards the fort and bridge at Pons Aelius, present-day Newcastle upon Tyne, possibly linking to Washing Wells Roman Fort in Whickham, but no evidence of a road here has yet been found to support this.

== List of forts on the Stanegate ==
From east to west:

- Corstopitum (Corbridge) (major fort)
- Newbrough (minor fort)
- Vindolanda (Chesterholm) (major fort)
- Haltwhistle Burn (minor fort)
- Magnis (Carvoran) (major fort)
- Throp, just south of Gilsland (minor fort)
- Nether Denton (major fort)
- Castle Hill Boothby, between Brampton and Lanercost Priory (minor fort)
- Brampton Old Church (major fort)
- Luguvalium (Carlisle) (major fort)
- possibly Kirkbride

== Subsequent history ==
Much of the Stanegate provided the foundation for the Carelgate (or Carlisle Road), a medieval road running from Corbridge market place and joining the Stanegate west of Corstopitum. The Carelgate eventually deteriorated to such an extent that it was unusable by coaches and wagons. In 1751–1752, a new Military Road was built by General George Wade in the wake of the Jacobite rising of 1745.

== See also ==
- Hadrian's Wall
- History of Northumberland
- Roman Britain
- Roman roads in Britain
