= Haltwhistle Burn =

River in Northumberland, England

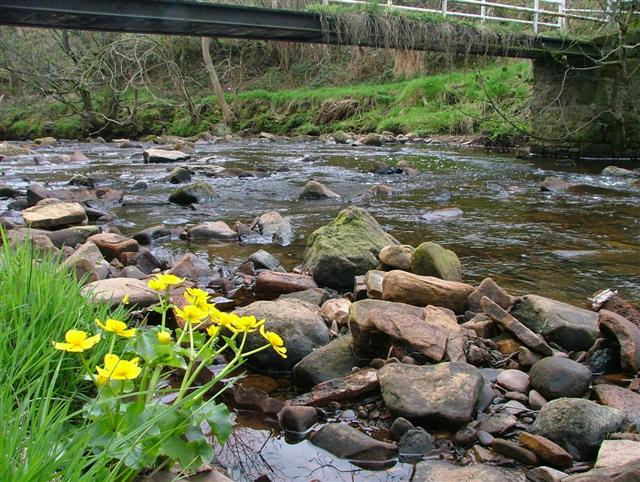
- Haltwhistle Burn

- Location within Northumberland

Location
- Country: United Kingdom
- County: Northumberland

Physical characteristics
- Mouth
  - coordinates: 54.9666°N 2.4437°W

The Haltwhistle Burn is a river which lies to the east of the Northumbrian town of Haltwhistle. Rising in the peaty uplands below the ridge of the Whin Sill, the burn passes through the Roman Military Zone south of Hadrian's Wall and through a dramatic sandstone gorge before descending between wooded banks to the South Tyne Valley. The Haltwhistle Burn drains an area of approximately 42 km^{2}. Today, the Burn is a haven for wildlife and a popular walk for residents and tourists but from Roman times until the 1930s the combination of valuable minerals and water power attracted a succession of industries which provided goods and employment to the town.

== Tributaries ==
The main tributaries of Haltwhistle Burn are Caw Burn and Pont Gallon Burn. From their confluence on downstream, the burn is known as Haltwhistle Burn. The name Caw Burn is first attested in 1669. The Caw element has been thought to have originated as an Old English personal name Cawa or an Old English common noun cawa (meaning "jackdaw" or "corvid").

== Geology and associated industries ==
The rocks underlying this part of Northumberland were laid down during the Carboniferous Period when variations in sea level resulted in successive deposits of limestone, shale, sandstone, and coal, known in the UK as Yoredale Series and in the US as cyclothems. The water of the Haltwhistle Burn has cut through these deposits giving access to building stone, clay and coal, leading to the development of the associated industries of quarrying, lime burning, brick, tile and pipe manufacture, coal mining and coke (fuel) and coal-gas production. Ironstone, found in association with the coal seams was also smelted on the banks of the burn.

== Water power ==
The bed of the burn descends into the valley at a gentle angle of approximately 1 degree but the fall is sufficient to have run a corn mill and three woollen manufactories during the 18th and 19th centuries. The earliest of these processes to be mechanised was fulling, with the first records on the site dating to 1612. Later, with advances in technology, the carding and spinning of wool was also carried out in watermills. The advent of steam-driven mills led to the abandonment of woollen processing along the burn. Two mills were demolished in the 1930s and the remaining fulling mill is now a dwelling.

== Roman fort ==
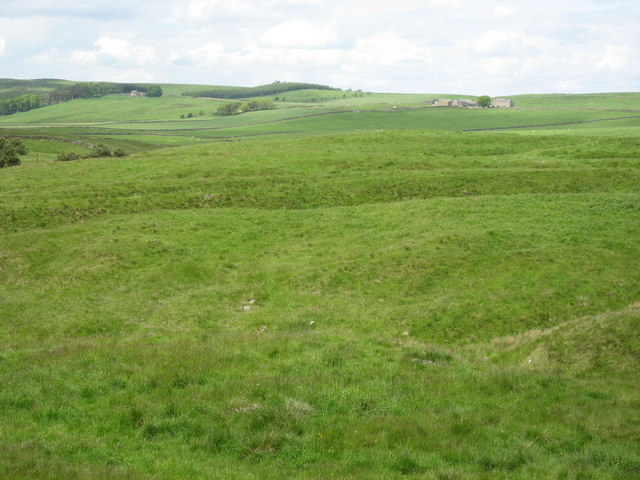
Earthworks of Haltwhistle Burn Roman Fort

The remains of Haltwhistle Burn Roman Fort are situated on the eastern bank of Haltwhistle Burn, just north of the point where it is crossed by the B6318, the so-called Military Road here dating from the eighteenth century (grid reference NY71456614). In-between the fort and the Military Road is the Stanegate Roman road dating from AD 71, the earlier northern frontier preceding Hadrian's Wall, as did Haltwhistle Burn Roman fort which it served. A large curving embankment survives which was built to carry the Stanegate from near the south gate of the fort down to the river, and another stretch of embankment carries the Stanegate up through a Roman cutting on the west side of the river.

Just to the north of the fort are three separate Roman marching camps.

== Citizen science ==
The Haltwhistle Burn has been used as an important pilot site for an innovative citizen science research project led by Newcastle University. The project enabled the local community to monitor the weather and water environment using simple and low-cost methods, including rainfall, river levels and flood events. This has provided locals and scientists, who are concerned about preserving the health of the Haltwhistle Burn, with increased knowledge in order to manage flood risk, water quality and river morphology issues. These citizen science observations are being used to fill the data gaps in order to understand and manage location-specific issues. Commencing in 2013, the project was one of the first in the UK to explore and implement citizen science in this way.
