= Fourstones =

Coordinates: 55.0113°N 2.1790°W

- Location within Northumberland
- OS grid reference: NY885685
- Unitary authority: Northumberland
- Ceremonial county: Northumberland
- Region: North East
- Country: England
- Sovereign state: United Kingdom
- Post town: HEXHAM
- Postcode district: NE47
- Dialling code: 01434
- Police: Northumbria
- Fire: Northumberland
- Ambulance: North East
- UK Parliament: Hexham

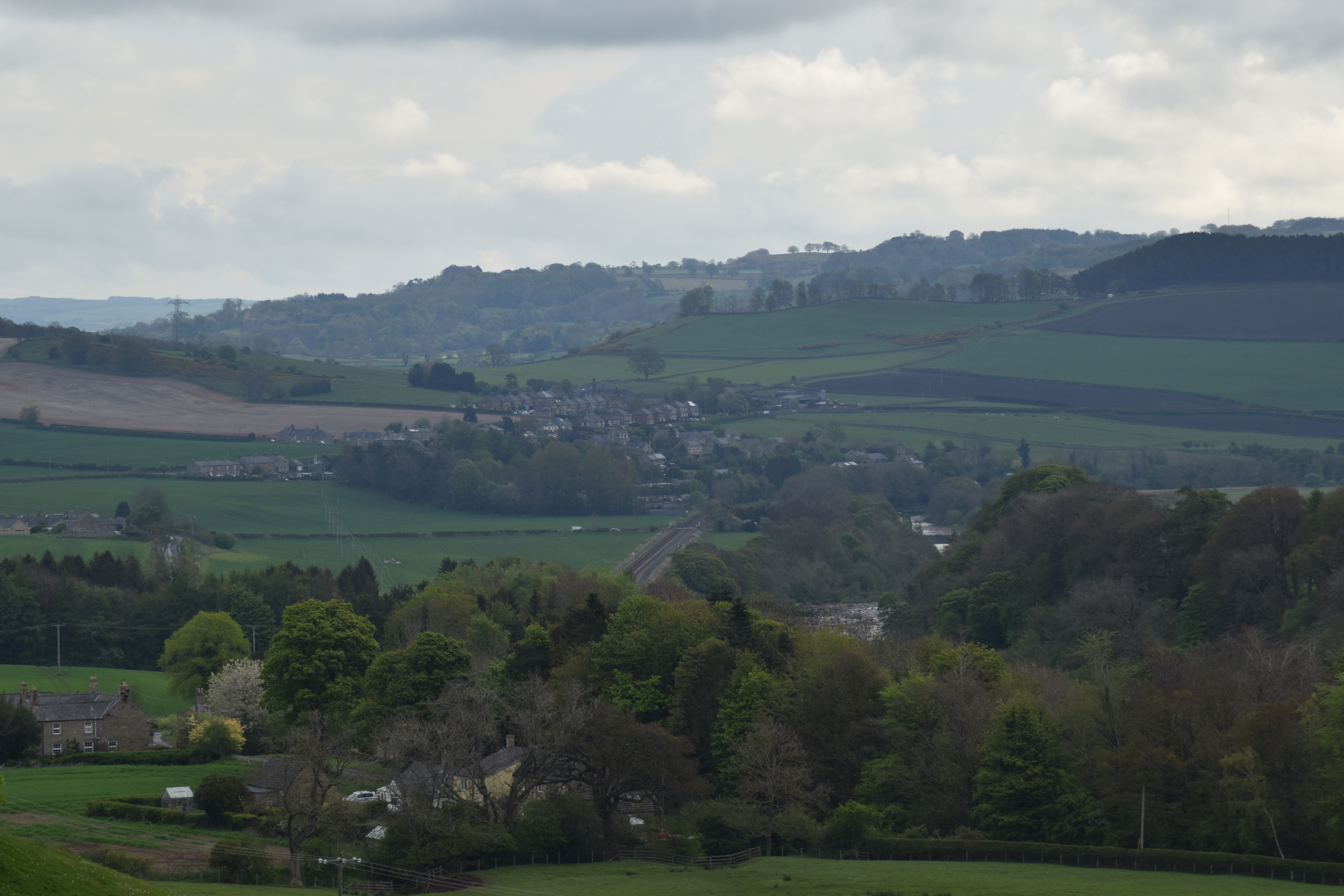

Fourstones is a village in Northumberland, England. The village lies on the north bank of the River South Tyne about 4 miles (6 km) west of Hexham.

== Landmarks ==
Newbrough and Fourstones are on the Stanegate Roman road, built in AD 71, which runs from east to west and formed the original northern frontier before the building of Hadrian's Wall. Newbrough's church stands on the site of one of the line of forts along this road.

Fourstones was the site of the first official Boy Scouts camp held by Lord Baden-Powell in 1908. The camp was at Carr Edge Farm and a monument stands in the woods nearby.

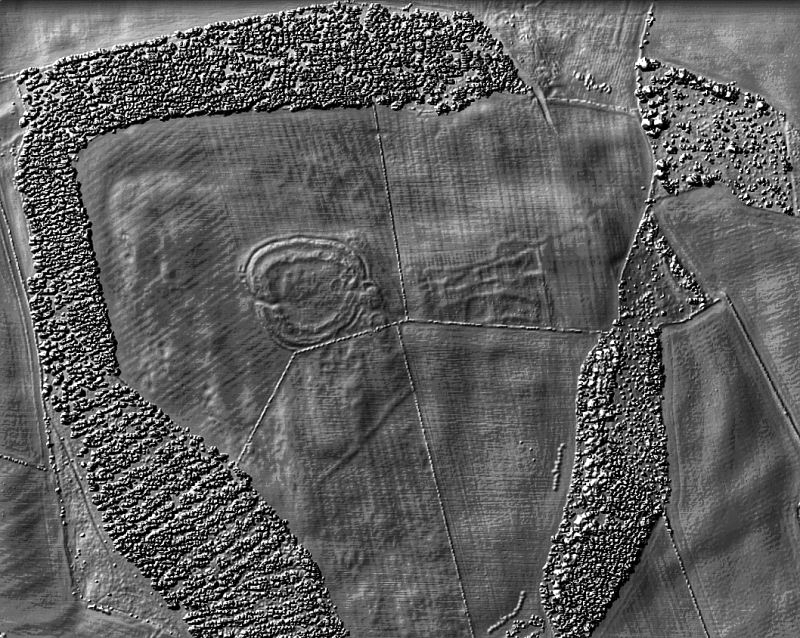
A lidar view of the local hillfort and Roman period settlement at Warden Hill.

== See also ==
- Stanegate
