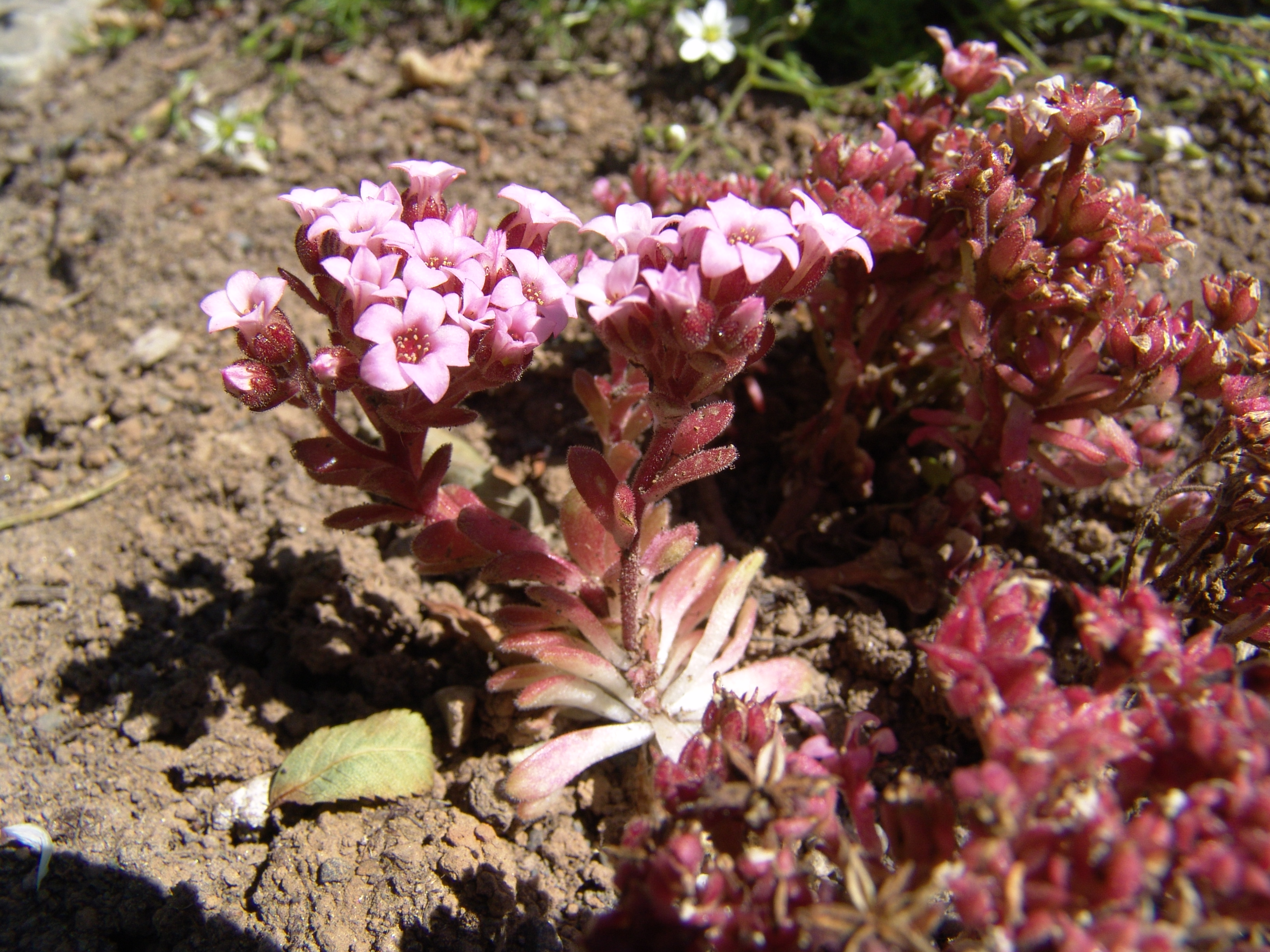

Scientific classification
- Kingdom: Plantae
- Clade: Tracheophytes
- Clade: Angiosperms
- Clade: Eudicots
- Order: Saxifragales
- Family: Crassulaceae
- Genus: Sedum
- Species: S. villosum

Binomial name
- Sedum villosum L.

Synonyms
- Hjaltalinia villosa (L.) Á.Löve & D.Löve; Oreosedum villosum (L.) Grulich; Sedella villosa (L.) Fourr.; Sedum glandulosum Moris; Sedum insulare Moris; Sedum pentandrum (DC.) Boreau

= Sedum villosum =

Species of succulent

Sedum villosum, known as the hairy stonecrop or purple stonecrop, is a biennial to perennial flowering plant. Its leaves, which are 3–8 mm (0.1–0.3 in) long and may be reddish in colour, are generally covered with hairs, although S. villosum var. glabratum may have hairless leaves. Individual flowers have five pink petals, each up to 5 mm (0.2 in) long.

It is native to Greenland, Iceland and northern and central Europe, east to Lithuania and Poland. It has also been recorded from islands in south-eastern Canada. Within Britain, it is found as far south as mid-Yorkshire. Compared to other species in the genus Sedum, it is unusual in preferring damp habitats.
