= Cardurnock =

Settlement in Cumbria, England

Coordinates: 54.91°N 03.29°W

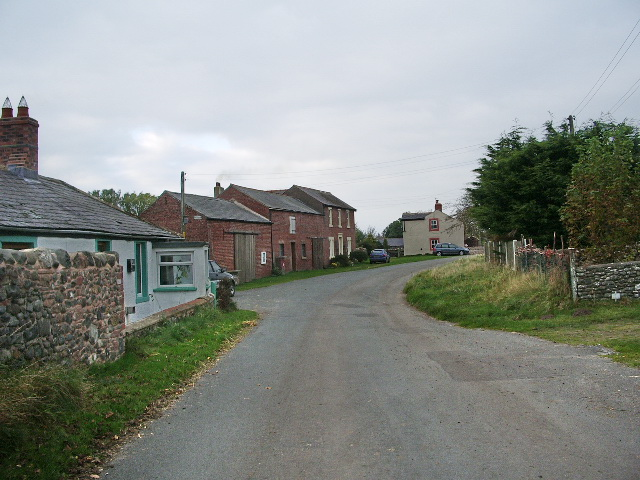
- Cardurnock

- Location in Allerdale, Cumbria Location within Cumbria
- OS grid reference: NY1758
- Civil parish: Bowness-on-Solway
- Unitary authority: Cumberland
- Ceremonial county: Cumbria
- Region: North West
- Country: England
- Sovereign state: United Kingdom
- Post town: WIGTON
- Postcode district: CA7
- Dialling code: 016973
- Police: Cumbria
- Fire: Cumbria
- Ambulance: North West
- UK Parliament: Penrith and Solway

Cardurnock is a small settlement in Cumbria, England. It is by the coast, 20 kilometres (12 mi) west of Carlisle. The western extension of the Hadrian's Wall frontier defences once passed through the Cardurnock peninsula, though not the Wall itself. The sites of two small Roman fortlets, Milefortlet 4 and Milefortlet 5, have been located to the north and south of Cardurnock. It is adjacent to the Anthorn Radio Station.

== Location ==
The Building or site itself may lie within the Boundary of more than one Authority.
