= Newbrough =

Village in Northumberland, England

Coordinates: 55.0055°N 2.1985°W

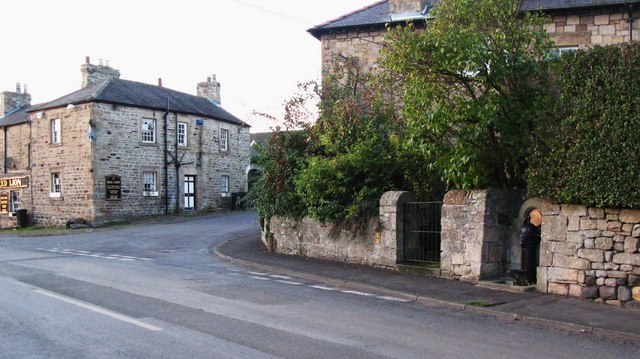
- Stanegate, Newbrough

- Location within Northumberland
- Population: 561 (2011)
- OS grid reference: NY874679
- Unitary authority: Northumberland
- Ceremonial county: Northumberland
- Region: North East
- Country: England
- Sovereign state: United Kingdom
- Post town: HEXHAM
- Postcode district: NE47
- Dialling code: 01434
- Police: Northumbria
- Fire: Northumberland
- Ambulance: North East
- UK Parliament: Hexham

Newbrough (pronounced “Newbruff”) is a village in Northumberland, England, on the north bank of the River South Tyne about 5 miles (8 km) north-west of Hexham.

== History ==
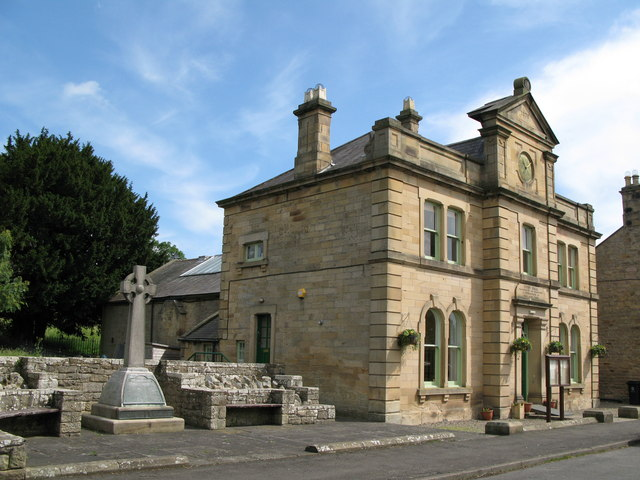
Newbrough Town Hall

Newbrough is the site of one of the line of Roman forts along the original northern frontier of the Roman Stanegate road built in AD 71. Newbrough’s church stands on the site.

Newbrough was anciently part of the Manor of Thornton. The mediæval tower house known as Thornton Tower was reported to be in a state of decay in a survey in 1541. The Grade II listed building is now completely ruinous.

== Governance ==
Newbrough is in the parliamentary constituency of Hexham.

== Landmarks ==
Newbrough Hall is an early 19th-century country house at Newbrough. It is a Grade II* listed building.

The estate was held by John Armstrong in 1692 and by John Bacon in the early 18th century. In 1811 the property passed to Bacon’s great grandson, the Reverend Henry Wastell.

Wastell built a new house in 1812 adjacent to the old tower, to a design by architect John Dobson. The estate later passed to his daughter and her husband of 1901, Colonel Coulson. They commissioned architect Francis William Deas (1862–1951) to modernise the house in 1902. The resulting two-storey house, with five bays of which the central was pedimented, was extended with two rear wings attached to the 1813 coach house to create a central courtyard. The house was equipped with electricity for which purpose a detached powerhouse was erected in the grounds. The powerhouse, now a separate dwelling, is Grade II listed.

Newbrough Town Hall, thought to be one of the finest in Tynedale, was completed in 1878 and extensively refurbished in 1998.

The Women's Institute building, formerly the Mechanics Institute, was built in 1854 and is a grade II listed building. It was given in 1948 to the Newbrough Women's Institute (WI) which was formed in 1923 and is still in existence. In 2000 the WI donated the building to the Town Hall, where it now meets (as it did before 1948). On 9 November 2015, the centenary of the first WI meeting in England, the building's entry in the National Heritage List for England was updated to include the WI connection, as were records for three other buildings of WI significance.

A mile north of the village is a burn known as Meggie's Dene, which is reputedly the burial site of a 16th-century witch called Old Meg. The grave is said to be marked by a pink thorn tree.

== Education ==
Newbrough CE First School, (Northumberland Local Education Authority) is an Infant School. It is a mixed school of Church of England religion.

== See also ==
- Newbrough Hall
