= Moricambe Bay =

Inlet of the Solway Firth in Cumbria, England

Coordinates: 54°54′02″N 3°18′41″W

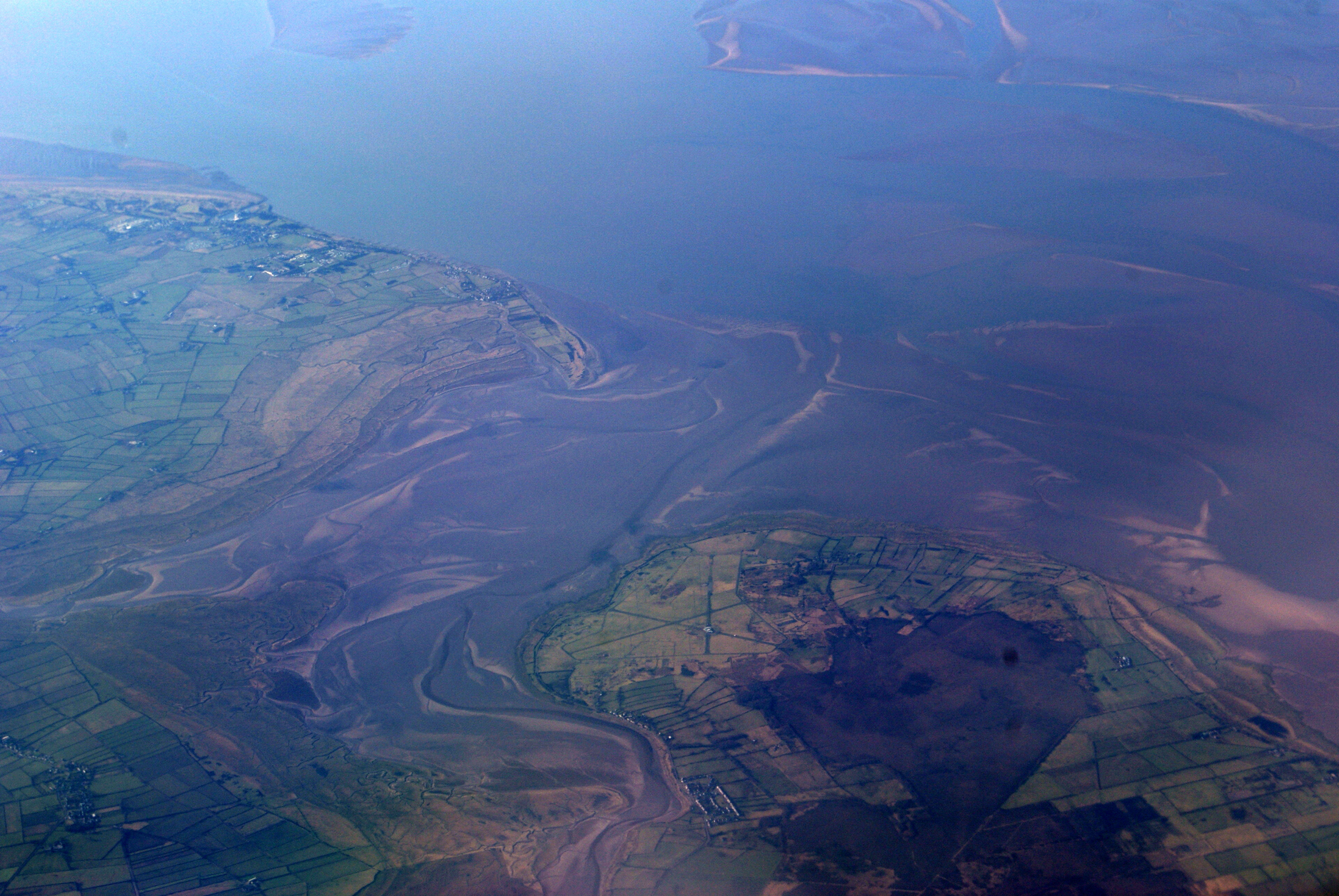
Moricambe Bay from the air

Moricambe Bay is an inlet of the Solway Firth in Cumbria (before 1974 in Cumberland) in north west England, created by the confluence of two rivers, the Waver and Wampool. To the south is the town of Silloth, and to the north the Anthorn radio station near Cardurnock.
