= Shefton Museum =

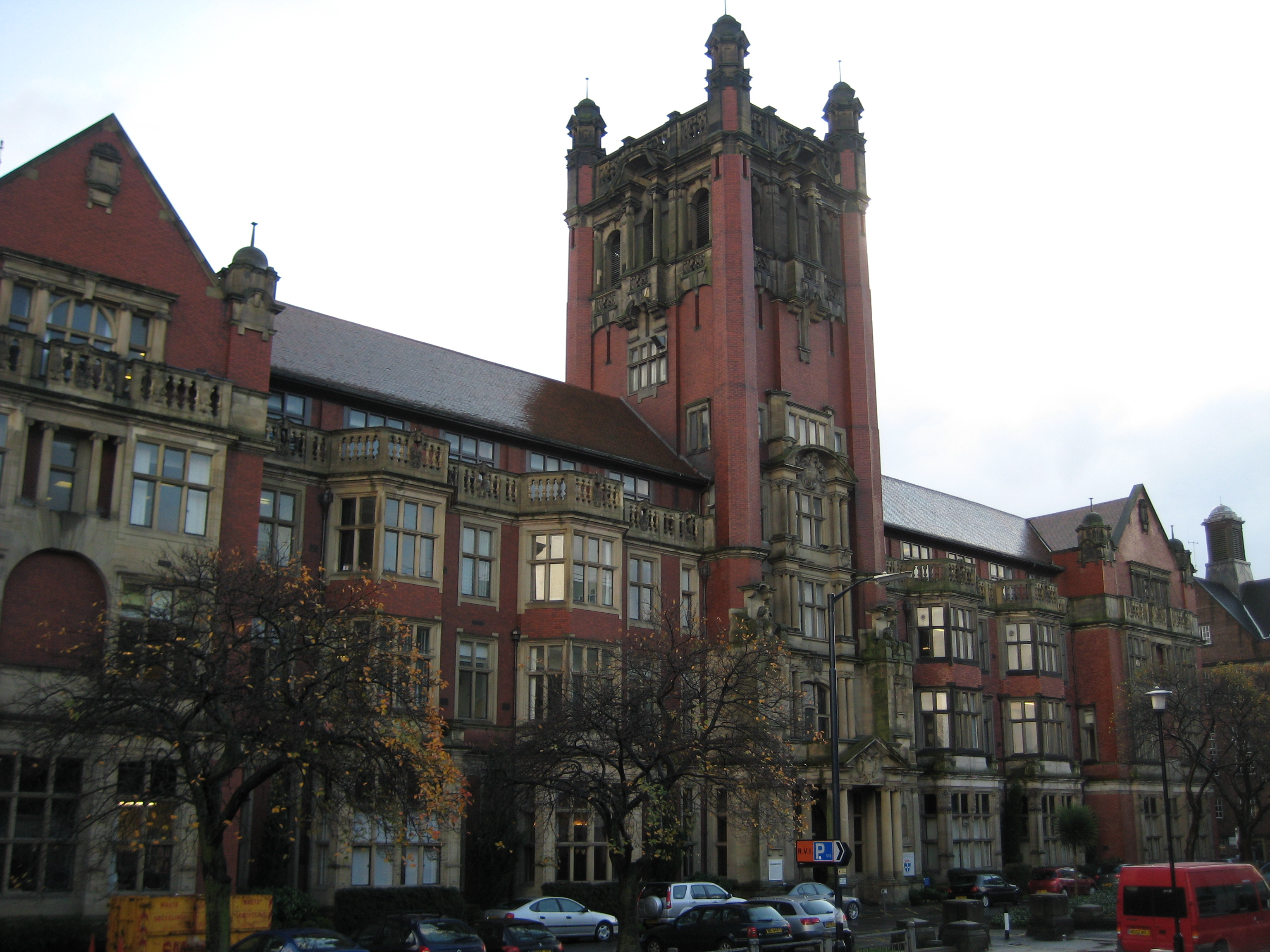
- The Armstrong Building, the former home of the Shefton Museum
- Established: 1956
- Dissolved: 2008
- Location: Newcastle upon Tyne, England, UK
- Coordinates: 54.9797°N 1.6160°W
- Type: Archaeology museum
- Director: Lindsay Allason-Jones
- Curator: Prof. Tony Spawforth
- Public transit access: Metro

Great North Museum
- Great North Museum: Hancock; Hatton Gallery

The Shefton Museum of Greek Art and Archaeology was an archaeological museum at the University of Newcastle upon Tyne, England, which opened in 1956 and closed in 2008. Its collections are now part of the Great North Museum: Hancock.

== History ==
The museum was located in the Department of Classics in the Armstrong Building of the main University campus. It was founded in 1956 by Professor Brian B. Shefton with a grant of £20 from the university's Rector, Charles Bosanquet. Since then the collection has grown to over 800 objects. Professor B. B. Shefton was the curator until 1984 when his role was taken over by Professor Tony Spawforth. Shefton died on 25 January 2012, aged 92.

As part of the Great North Museum Project the Shefton collection, along with Museum of Antiquities, was moved to the Great North Museum: Hancock. On 18 April 2008 the museum closed in preparation for the relocation of its collections to the newly renovated Hancock Museum, which opened in May 2009.
