= Museum of Antiquities (Newcastle upon Tyne) =

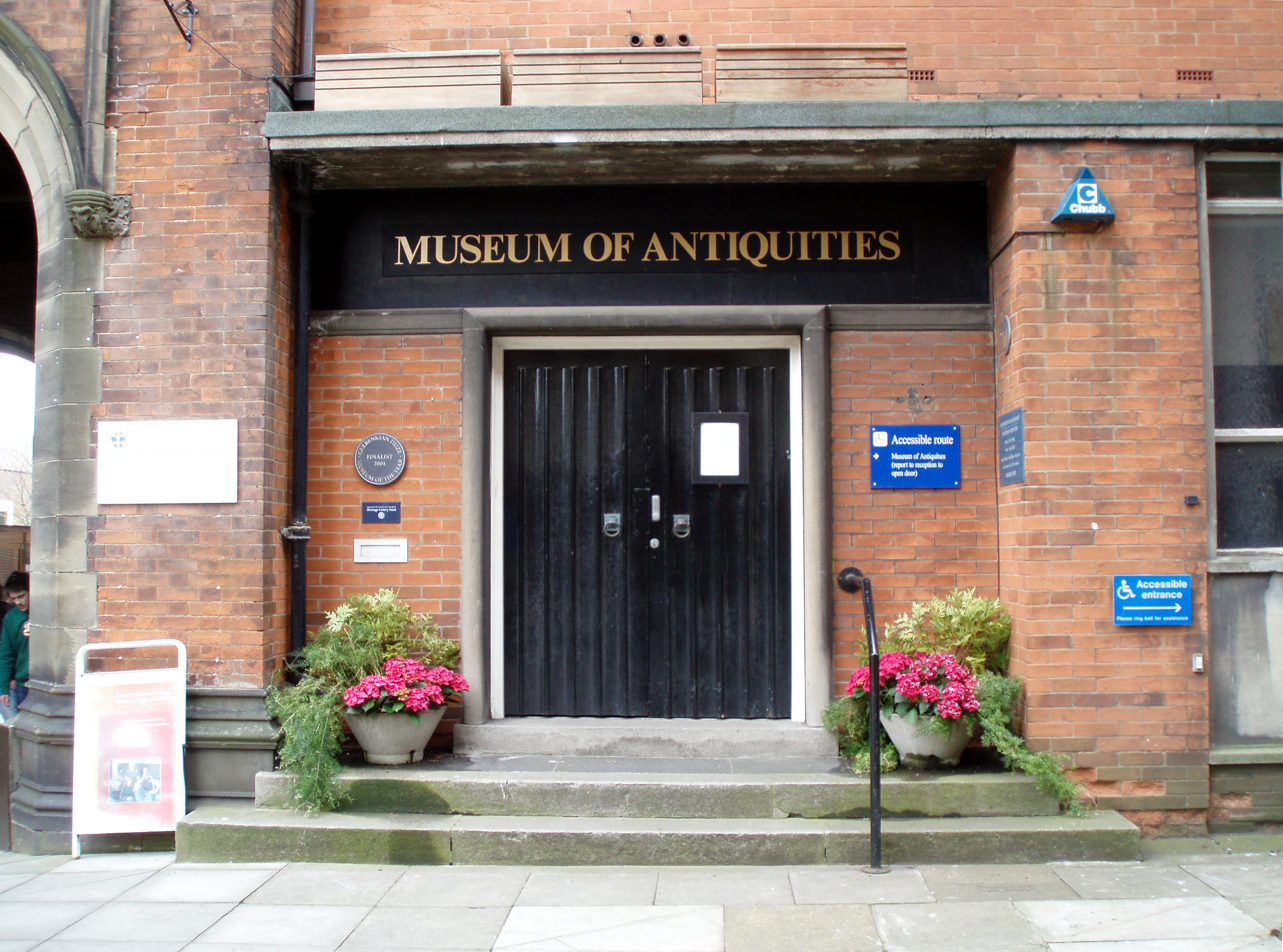
- Museum of Antiquities entrance pictured in 2008; The building has since been demolished
- Established: 1960
- Dissolved: 2008 (merged into the Great North Museum)
- Location: Newcastle upon Tyne, England
- Coordinates: 54.9793°N 1.6153°W
- Type: Archaeology museum
- Director: Lindsay Allason-Jones

Great North Museum
- Great North Museum: Hancock; Hatton Gallery

The Museum of Antiquities was an archaeological museum at the University of Newcastle upon Tyne, England. It opened in 1960 and in 2009 its collections were merged into the Great North Museum: Hancock.

== History ==
The museum was established in 1956 by the Society of Antiquaries of Newcastle upon Tyne and Durham University (Newcastle University from 1963). It was the main archaeology museum in north east England. It covered the history of the region, especially Hadrian's Wall and the Roman period in general. It included a full-scale reconstruction of the 3rd-century temple dedicated to the Roman god Mithras at Carrawburgh. Overall, the period from early prehistory to the 17th century was covered. The university's memorabilia shop was also located inside.

As part of the Great North Museum Project the museum, along with Shefton Museum was moved to the Hancock Museum. On 19 April 2008, the museum closed in preparation for the relocation to the newly renovated Hancock Museum, which reopened in May 2009.

The building that housed the Museum of Antiquities was demolished in 2011–12. It dated from the end of the Second World War and had originally been a coke testing station.

== Awards ==
The museum was a finalist for the Gulbenkian Prize for Museum of the Year in 2004. The museum was also supported by the Heritage Lottery Fund.
