= Brian Shefton =

German-born British classical archaeologist

Brian Benjamin Shefton
- Born: Bruno Benjamin Scheftelowitz; August 11, 1919; Cologne, Germany
- Died: January 25, 2012 (aged 92)
- Occupation: Archaeologist

Brian Benjamin Shefton, FBA, FSA (born Bruno Benjamin Scheftelowitz; 11 August 1919 – 25 January 2012) was a German-born British classical archaeologist.

He was the founder of the Shefton Museum, which bore his name.

== Early life and education ==
Scheftelowitz was born on 11 August 1919 in Cologne, Germany. He was the younger son of Isidor Isaac Scheftelowitz (1875–1934), a scholar and rabbi, and Frieda Scheftelowitz (née Kohn; 1880–1971). Following the rise of the Nazi Party, his father was sacked from his academic job at Cologne University; he had been Professor of Indo-Iranian Philology. Brian was being educated at de:Apostelgymnasium, a Roman Catholic gymnasium in Cologne, until he had to leave. In 1933, his family emigrated from Germany for England to escape from the Nazis.

For their first year in England, the Scheftelowitz family lived in Ramsgate, Kent, where his father taught at Montefiore College, a Jewish theological seminary, and Brian was educated at St Lawrence College, an independent school in the town. The University of Oxford made a number of positions "to assist Jewish scholars exiled from Germany", and so the family moved to Oxford in 1934; his father had been offered "hospitality" by Balliol College and a lecturership in the Faculty of the Board of Oriental Languages and Literature. In Oxford, Brian was educated at Magdalen College School, then an all-boys independent school. His father died of kidney failure in December 1934, but the family remained in Oxford. Having won an open scholarship, he matriculated at Oriel College, Oxford in 1938 to study Literae humaniores (i.e. classics). In 1940, he achieved second class honours in "mods", the first part of the degree that consisted of the study of Latin and Ancient Greek. He went on to specialise in Greek archaeology and among his lecturers were Paul Jacobsthal and John Beazley. He resumed his university studied after the end of the Second World War. He graduated from the University of Oxford with a first class honours Bachelor of Arts (BA) degree in 1947.

=== Second World War ===
In 1940, following the fall of France, a large number of German and Austrian refugees in Britain were interned on the Isle of Man as "enemy aliens". Scheftelowitz was most likely not one of them, but his daughter would later claim that he was interned for a short period during the summer of 1940. However, in October of the same year, he interrupted his studies to serve in the British Army. He enlisted in the Pioneer Corps, which was the only British military unit in which enemy aliens could then serve. He trained at the Pioneer Corps centre in Ilfracombe, Devon, alongside a variety of Jewish and other anti-Nazi professionals and intellectuals which would form the "most intellectualised unit of the British Army". He then served with the 249 (Alien) Company Pioneer Corps which was involved in military camp construction in Catterick, Yorkshire, and then in Scotland. Having anglicised his name to Brian Benjamin Shefton, he transferred to the Army Educational Corps in November 1944, where he served until the end of the war.

== Academic career ==
After graduation, Shefton joined the British School at Athens on a School Studentship in 1947. He would go on to receive a Derby Scholarship from the University Oxford a Bishop Fraser Scholarship from Oriel College, Oxford, thereby receiving funding for three years in Greece. He assisted on the British excavation at Old Smyrna in western Turkey, and studied the pottery (including Attic red-figure and East Greek pottery) from the American excavation in the Ancient Agora of Athens.

== Personal life ==
On 30 June 1947, Shefton swore the Oath of Allegiance and became a naturalised citizen of the United Kingdom.
