= Great North Museum: Hancock =

Natural history museum in England

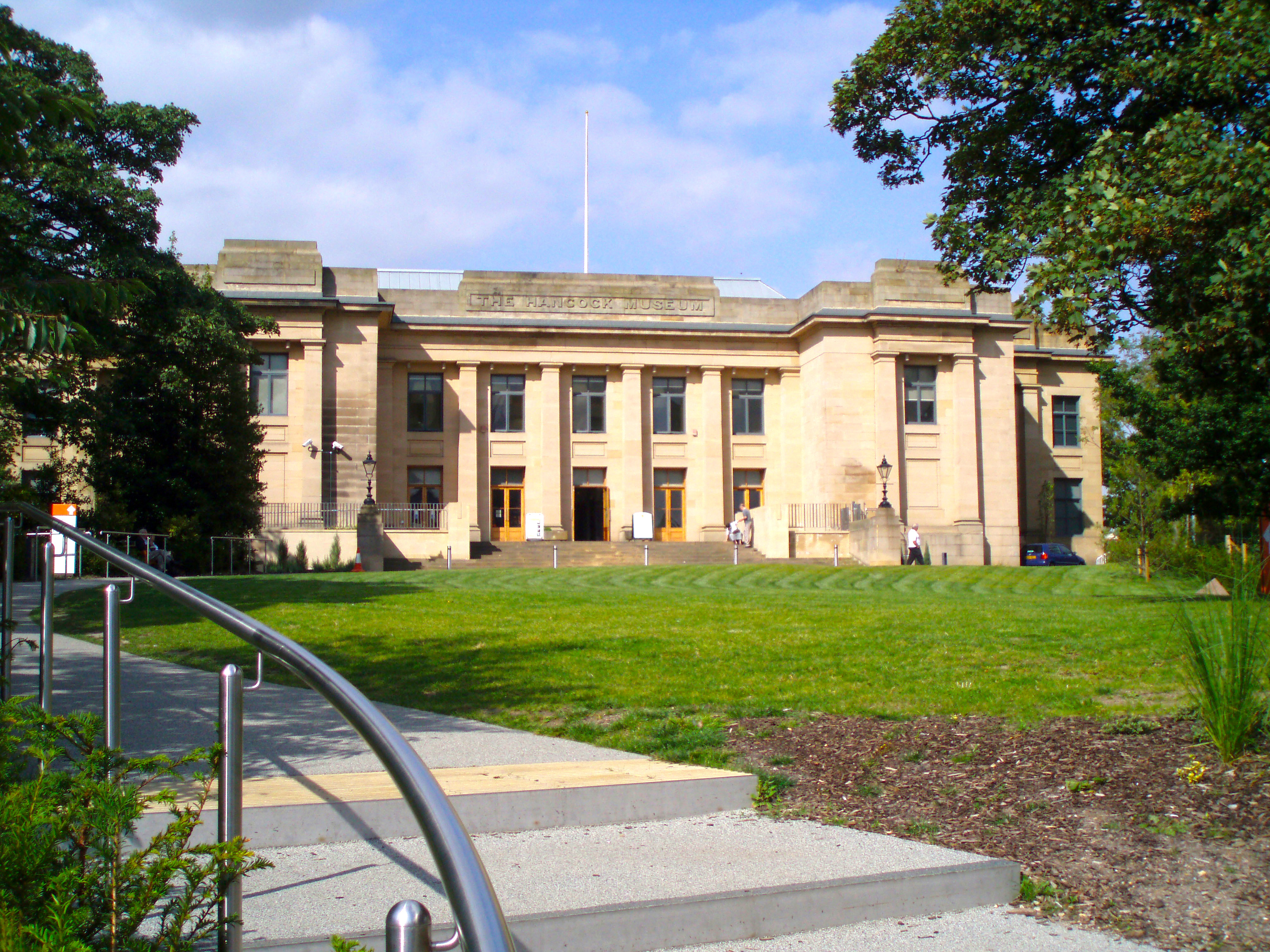
- Established: 1884
- Location: Newcastle upon Tyne, England
- Coordinates: 54.980°N 1.613°W
- Type: Natural history museum
- Visitors: 228,024 (2025)
- Owner: Natural History Society of Northumbria
- Public transit access: Haymarket Metro/Bus station
- Website: www.northeastmuseums.org.uk/greatnorthmuseum

Great North Museum
- Great North Museum: Hancock; Hatton Gallery

The Great North Museum: Hancock is a museum of natural history and ancient civilisations in Newcastle upon Tyne, England.

The museum was established in 1884 and was formerly known as the Hancock Museum. In 2006 it merged with Newcastle University's Museum of Antiquities and Shefton Museum to form the Great North Museum. The museum reopened as the Great North Museum: Hancock in May 2009 following a major extension and refurbishment of the original Victorian building. The museum and most of its collections are owned by the Natural History Society of Northumbria, and it is managed by North East Museums on behalf of Newcastle University.

== Location ==
The museum is located on the campus of Newcastle University, next to the Great North Road, and close to Barras Bridge. The nearest Tyne & Wear Metro station is Haymarket, and there is also a bus station at Haymarket.

One of the Second World War air raid shelter openings into the Victoria Tunnel is beneath the grounds of the museum.

== History ==
The Hancock Museum logo used immediately prior to becoming the Great North Museum.

The collection of the Hancock Museum can be traced to about 1780 when Marmaduke Tunstall started accumulating ethnographic and natural history material from around the world. He then brought his collection from London to North Yorkshire. In 1790 Tunstall died, and George Allan of Darlington purchased Tunstall's collection; and later in 1823 it was acquired by the Literary and Philosophical Society of Newcastle upon Tyne. A wombat, which is still on display, is considered to be the earliest object in the collection. It was the first complete wombat specimen to reach Europe. In 1829 the Natural History Society of Northumberland, Durham and Newcastle upon Tyne (now the Natural History Society of Northumbria) was formed as a scientific offshoot of the Literary and Philosophical Society. Amongst the founding and early members of the Natural History Society were Joshua Alder, Albany Hancock, John Hancock, Prideaux John Selby and William Chapman Hewitson.

The museum opened on its current site in 1884 after the collection of the Natural History Society outgrew its small museum, located on Westgate Road, which opened in 1834. A major benefactor to the museum was William Armstrong who gave the then large sum of £11,500. Armstrong had also founded the College of Physical Science which later became part of Newcastle University. The museum was renamed in the 1890s, after the local Victorian naturalists, Albany and John Hancock. In 1959 the Natural History Society agreed with the University of Newcastle for the university to care for the building and collections, and since 1992 the university has contracted with North East Museums to manage the museum under a Service Level Agreement.

=== Reopening as Great North Museum ===
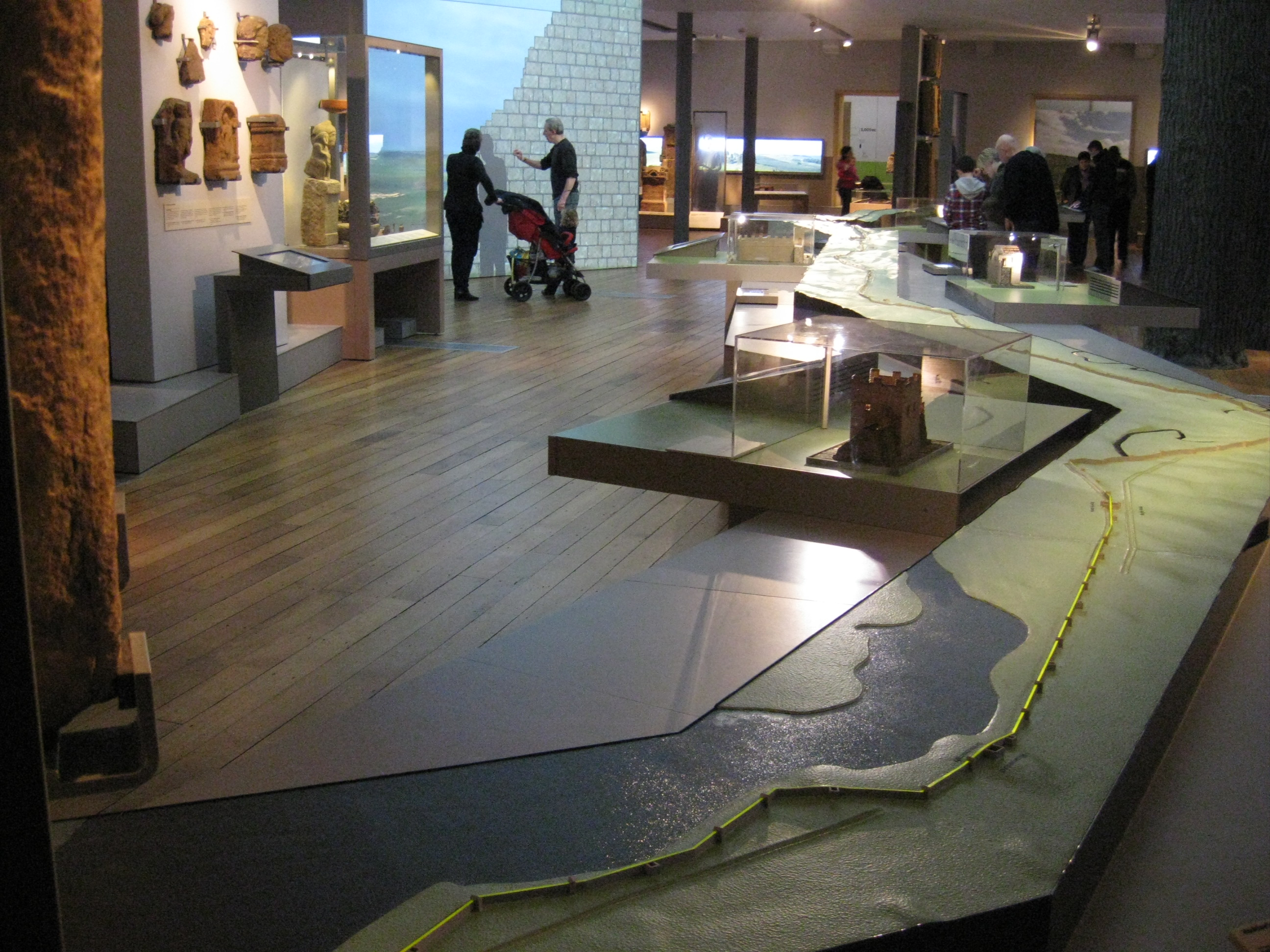
Hadrian's Wall display area.

The Hancock Museum was closed on 23 April 2006 for refurbishment and did not reopen until 23 May 2009. It was completely refurbished and extended as part of the Great North Museum Project, at a cost of £26 million. Great North Museum project is a partnership between Newcastle University, North East Museums, Newcastle City Council, the Natural History Society of Northumbria and the Society of Antiquaries of Newcastle upon Tyne. The project was made possible with funds from the Heritage Lottery Fund, TyneWear Partnership, One NorthEast, the European Regional Development Fund, Newcastle University, Newcastle City Council, the Department for Culture, Media and Sport, the Wolfson Foundation and The Northern Rock Foundation, as well as numerous other trusts and foundations. The building architects were Terry Farrell and Partners; Sir Terry Farrell is a native of Newcastle, and had previously been a student at Newcastle University.

The new museum includes new displays on natural history and geology, Ancient Egypt and Ancient Greece, Romans and Hadrian's Wall, World Cultures and Pre-history. It also includes an interactive study zone, an under 5's space, and a digital Planetarium, as well as new learning facilities, a new temporary exhibition space, and a study garden. The new museum houses not only the Hancock Museum collections, but also those of the university's Museum of Antiquities and Shefton Museum. The building that formerly housed the Museum of Antiquities was later demolished. The Hatton Gallery is also a part of the Great North Museum Project, but is not relocating to the Hancock, and is remaining in Newcastle University's Fine Art Building.

In September 2008, the Great North Museum searched for a lookalike of the Emperor Hadrian, for a photo shoot, whose likeness would feature in a permanent display at the Hancock Museum. On 21 November 2008 the 'Be Part of It' campaign was launched, and it was announced that the Great North Museum: Hancock would be opening in May 2009. Athlete Jonathan Edwards is the patron of the 'Be Part of It' campaign. Other celebrity supporters of the museum include Sir Thomas Allen and Adam Hart-Davis. Donors to the campaign have the opportunity to have their name (or the name of a loved one) permanently included on a donor wall in the museum.

The Great North Museum formally re-opened on 23 May 2009. In August the museum announced that they had surpassed their expected annual target of 300,000 visitors. By August over 400,000 people had visited the reopened museum. On 6 November 2009 HM The Queen officially opened the Great North Museum. In 2009, the Great North Museum had over 600,000 visitors.

By August 2010, the reopened Great North Museum had welcomed its one millionth visitor.

== Collections ==
Among the museum's permanent residents are a life-size cast of an African elephant; the Egyptian mummy Bakt-en-Hor (previously known as Bakt-hor-Nekht); a full-size replica of a T-Rex skeleton; and Sparkie, Newcastle's famous talking budgie, who was stuffed after his death in 1962 and is now the subject of a new opera by Michael Nyman. The museum is also home to Irtyru, a second Egyptian mummy.

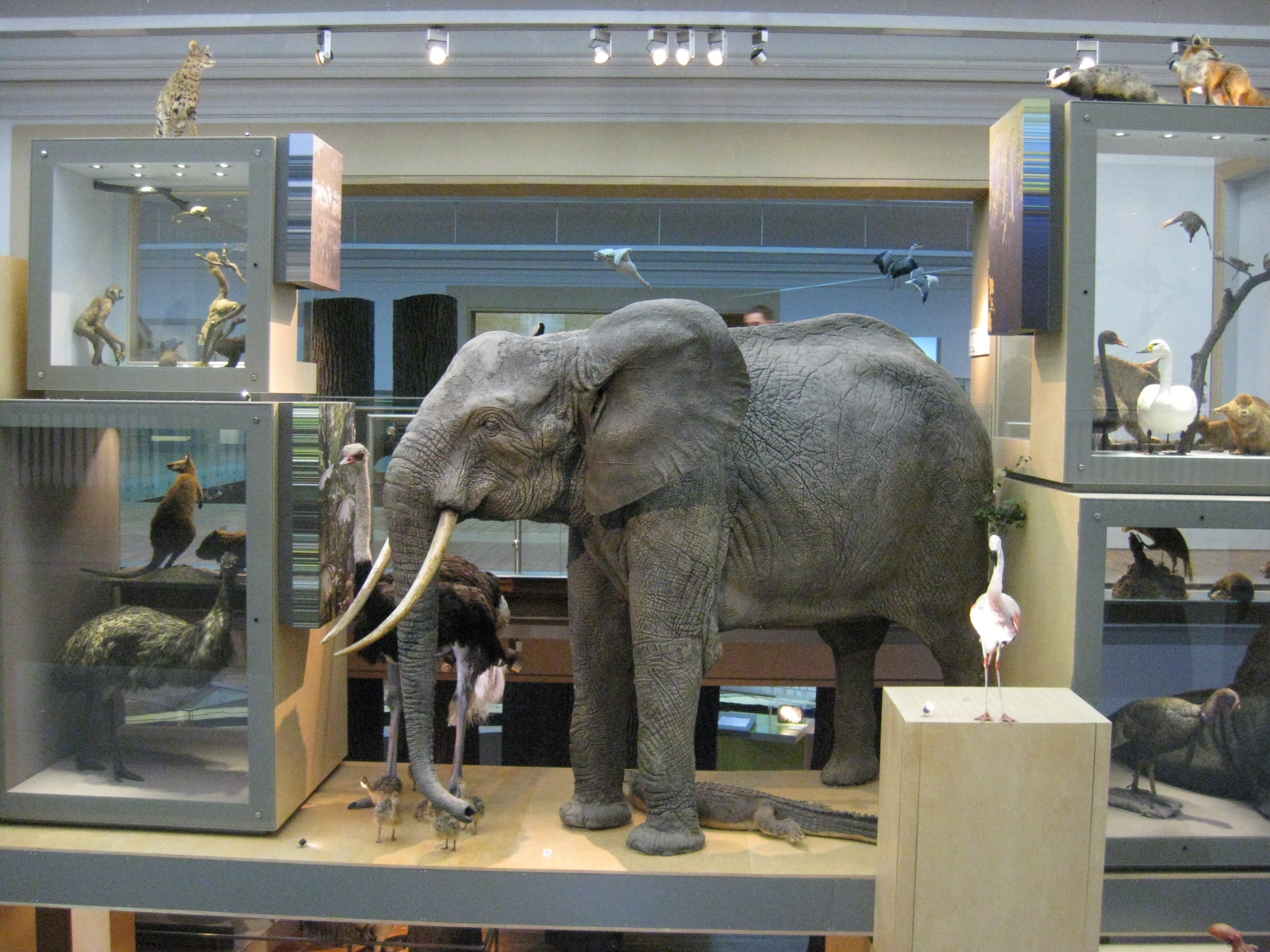
Elephant display.

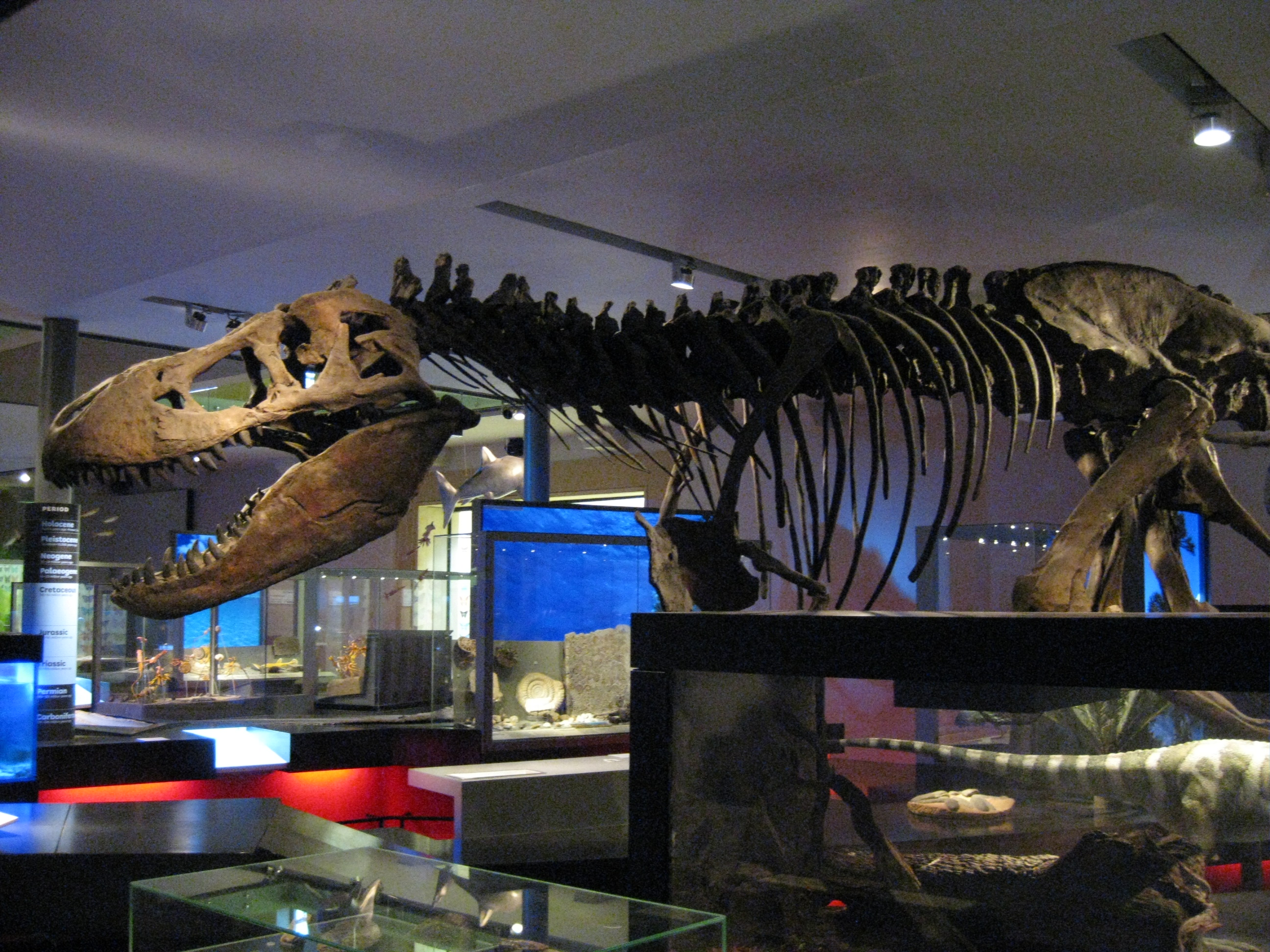
T-Rex in dinosaur hall.

The full-size cast of an African Elephant was built in the Living Planet gallery. The model was crafted by Zephyr Wildlife, who took a cast from an actual stuffed elephant at a museum in Bonn in Germany. To get the elephant into the museum a crane, from Bel Lift Trucks, had to be used. The full size model of a T-Rex dinosaur has been shipped from Canada, where it was built by a company called Research Casting International. It forms part of the display known as the Fossil Stories gallery. The T-Rex model was one of the first items to be placed in the new museum, due to its size. In 1908, the Manchester taxidermist Harry Ferris Brazenor mounted a "fine bison bull" for the museum.

Other exhibitions include 'Hadrian's Wall' looking at Roman life in the north of England, 'Natural Northumbria' focusing on the wildlife found in the northeast, 'Ancient Egypt' looking at the Ancient Egyptians and featuring the museum's two mummies, 'Ice Age to Iron Age' detailing the history of the British Isles over the past 12,000 years, 'World Cultures' featuring artifacts and displays from cultures across the globe, 'The Shefton Collection' with one of the most detailed collections of Greek artifacts in the UK and 'Explore' which is a more hands-on area of the museum and features regular interactive sessions.

There were live animals on display but these have now been withdrawn, as well as a conference area for corporate events and a fully provisioned learning suite for school visits.

The museum was entered into the 'long list' for the 2010 Art Fund Prize for museums and galleries.

The interactive Bio-Wall features hundreds of creatures, that visitors will be able to investigate and find out where they live and how they survive in such extreme places as the Arctic and Desert. There is also a great white shark display, polar bear and giraffe specimens from the historic Hancock collections and a moa skeleton. Also between May and October 2019 the museum hosted Dippy the dinosaur as part of its UK tour.

Within the museum's archives are the nineteenth-century botanical paintings by Margaret Rebecca Dickinson of plants from the Newcastle and Scottish Borders region.

== Library ==
The Great North Museum Library is open to the public and is located on the second floor of the Hancock. It houses three collections – the Library and Archives of the Natural History Society of Northumbria, the Library of the Society of Antiquaries of Newcastle upon Tyne and Newcastle University's Cowen Library.

== Notable staff ==
- Anthony Michael (Tony) Tynan, curator 1958–1992
- Dr Albert George Long, deputy curator 1966–1980

== See also ==
- Abel Chapman, Victorian 'hunter-naturalist' whose game trophies can be seen at the museum.
