= John Hancock (ornithologist) =

English ornithologist and taxidermist

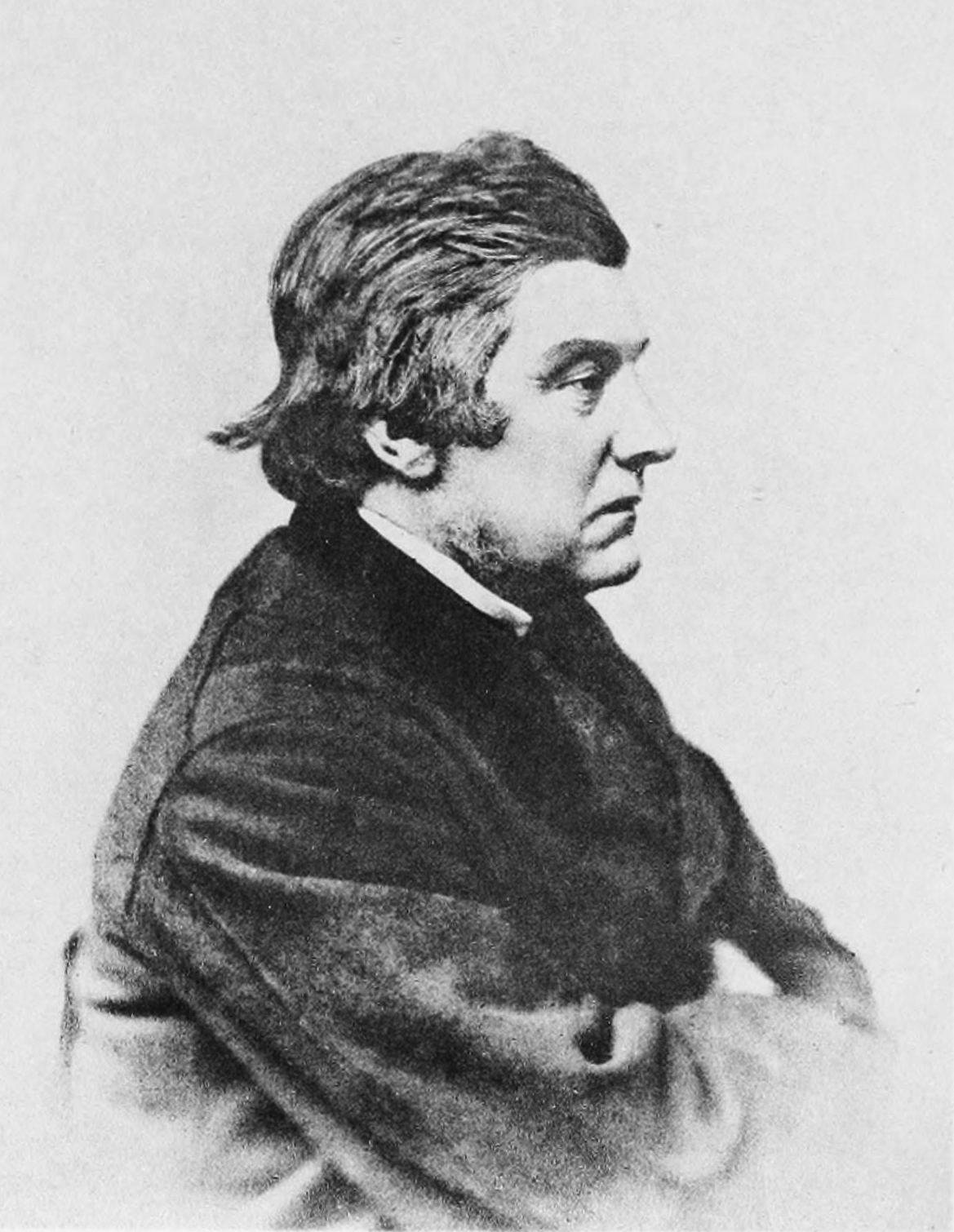
- John Hancock in 1874, photographed by Joseph W. Swan
- Born: 24 February 1808; Newcastle upon Tyne, England
- Died: 11 October 1890 (aged 82); St Mary's Terrace, Newcastle upon Tyne, England
- Occupation: Ornithologist
- Years active: 1829–1880s
- Known for: Ornithological work, including taxidermy, research, art, and writing
- Notable work: The Struggle with the Quarry, 1851

John Hancock (24 February 1808 – 11 October 1890) was an English naturalist, ornithologist, taxidermist, and landscape architect. Working during the golden age of taxidermy, when mounted animals became a popular part of Victorian-era interior design, Hancock is considered the father of modern taxidermy

Hancock introduced the style of dramatic and lifelike arrangement in taxidermy. One of his famous works, Struggle with the Quarry, depicted a falcon attacking a heron that held an eel. This taxidermy mount was an attraction at the 1851 Great Exhibition at the Crystal Palace in London.

== Life and work ==
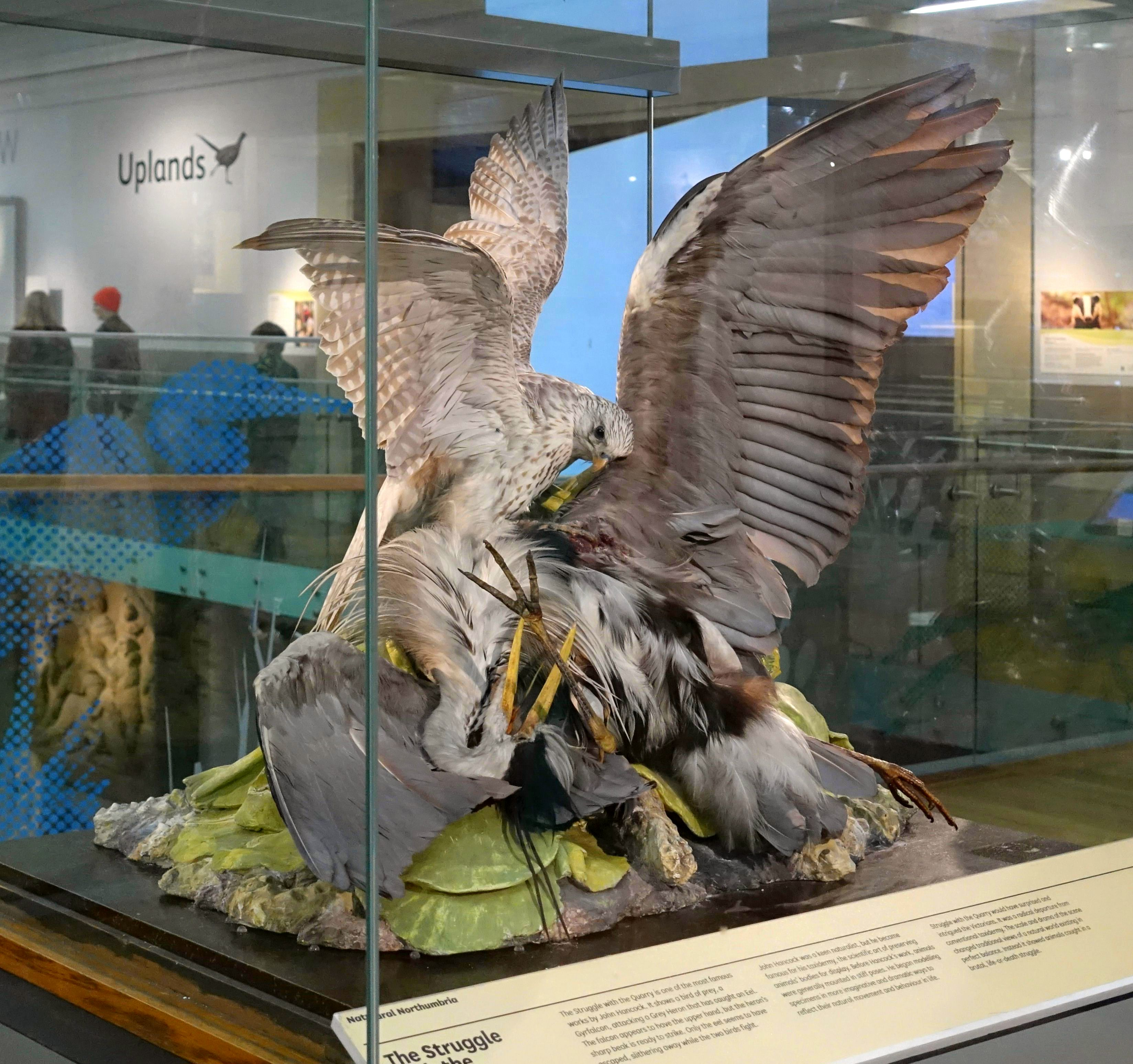
The Struggle with the Quarry, 1851, at the Hancock Museum

Hancock was born in Newcastle upon Tyne to John Hancock, Sr., who ran a saddle and hardware business. Their grandfather, Thomas, had been a saddler and ironmonger with a shop on Tyne Bridge prior to 1771, when it was destroyed in a flood. For some time, the family lived at Bensham and after the death of their father at the age of 43 in 1812, their mother moved them to Windmill Hills, Gateshead. Along with his brother Albany Hancock, they took an early interest in natural history from their father, who had a large collection of books on natural history. The children went to a seminary run by a Miss Anna Prowitt, where he learned to draw. The brothers also learned some mathematics from Henry Atkinson, on the High Bridge. They formed a small band of naturalists who travelled to nearby places in summer. This was well before the formation of the Natural History Society of Northumberland and Durham in 1829 and later groups such as the Tyneside Naturalists' Field Club in 1846, in which he participated. Already in 1829, he was the first to note the differences between the whooper and Bewick's swan, although a formal notice on the subject was read first by R.R. Wingate, a neighbour of Thomas Bewick's. John Hancock learned taxidermy from Richard Wingate. Hancock travelled with fellow naturalist William C. Hewitson and Benjamin Johnson to Norway in 1833. With Hewitson, they then visited Switzerland in 1845. Hancock was also an artist and produced several lithographic prints in the 1850s depicting his taxidermy preparations. His taxidermy mounts presented in the 1851 Great Exhibition drew great praise for their artistry.

Hancock was a mentor and tutor to celebrated ornithologist and bird painter Allan Brooks. For some time after 1878, following the death of W. C. Hewitson, Hancock lived at Hewitson's home in Oatlands, Surrey, which he had bequeathed to Hancock. The brothers lived with their sister, Mary Jane, at 4 St. Mary's Terrace, Newcastle, now part of a listed terrace at 14–20 Great North Road.

== Drawing and publishing ==
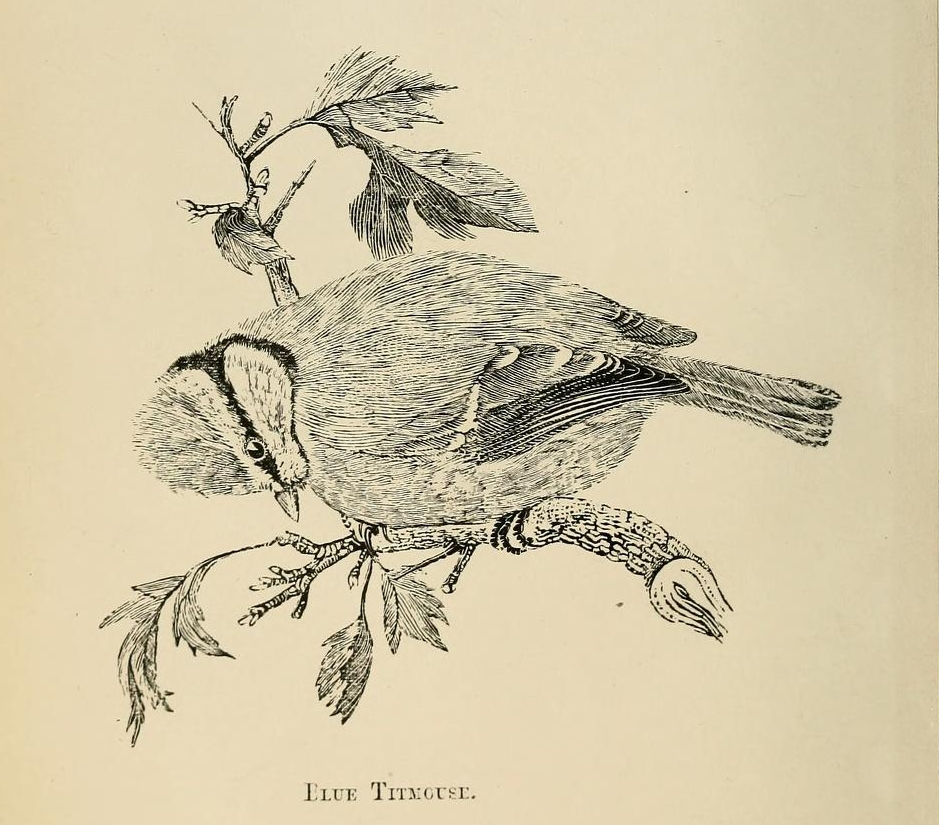
Engraving of a blue tit by Hancock

Hancock learned engraving and lithography and made several illustrated works. His 1863 A Fasciculus of Eight Drawings on Stone of Groups of Birds, the whole being representations of specimens stuffed and contributed by the Author to the Great Industrial Exhibition of 1851 included drawings of his taxidermic mounts. In 1874, Hancock published his Catalogue of the Birds of Northumberland and Durham. These works drew acclaim from Professor Alfred Newton for the accuracy of observation.

Hancock edited Thomas Bewick's 1847 edition of Birds. In 1868, he planned a layout for Newcastle Town Moor, which was only partly realised. In 1875, he was asked to prepare a plan for Saltwell Park, but declined due to pressure of work.

== Museum ==
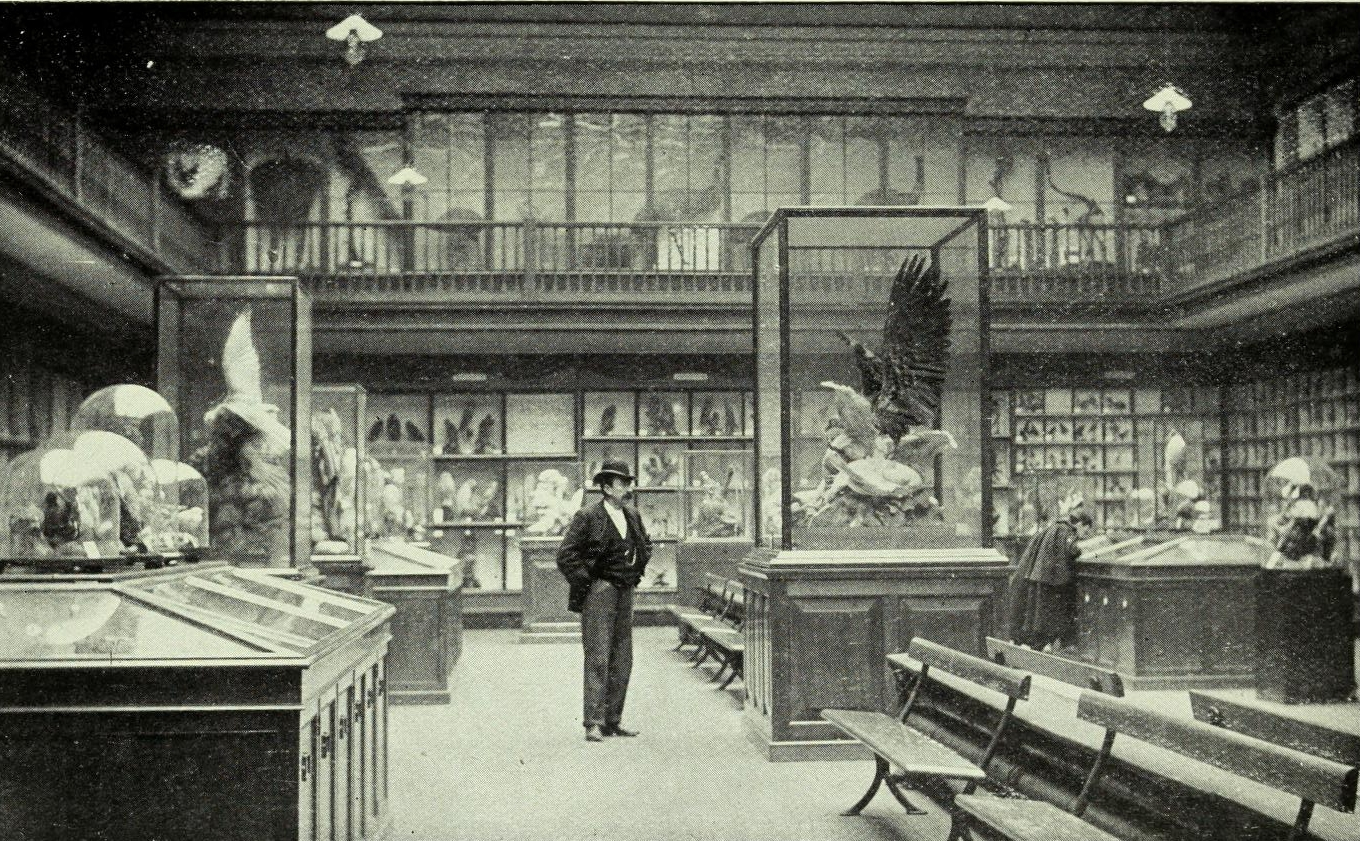
The bird room in the early 1900s

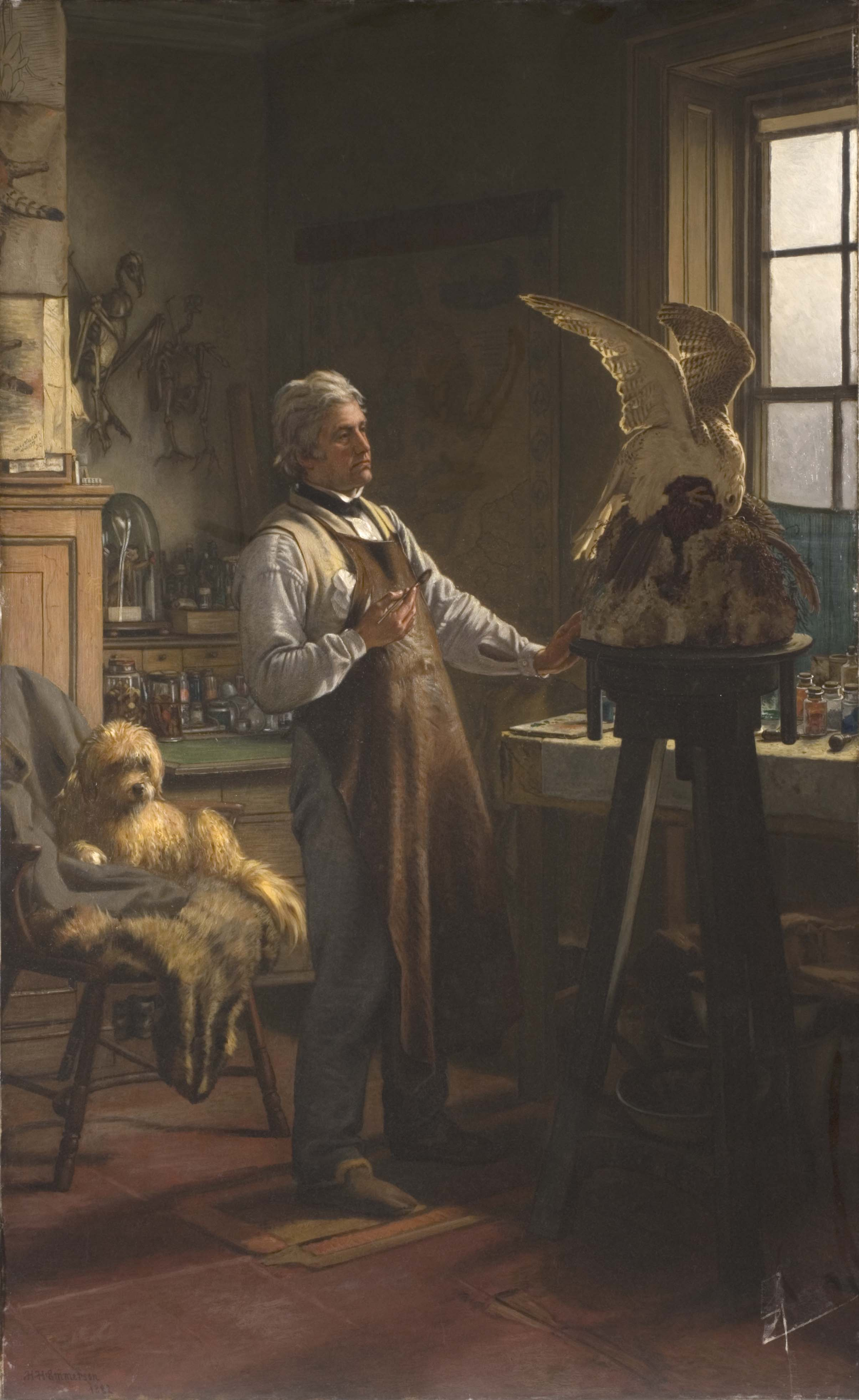
Portrait of John Hancock in his studio by H.H. Emmerson c. 1890

The Hancock Museum in Newcastle upon Tyne is named after the Hancock brothers, both of whom took an instrumental part in getting the museum built to house older collections made by Marmaduke Tunstall, George Allan, and others. The collections were held by the Natural History Society of Northumberland, Durham, and Newcastle-on-Tyne, and the members of the society included P. J. Selby, Nathaniel J. Winch, W. C. Hewitson, Dr. George Johnston of Berwick, Joshua Alder, and Albany Hancock. Alder and Hancock collected marine specimens extensively. After Albany died in 1873, a memorial was considered and John Hancock suggested a newer and larger building for the collections. Hancock persuaded Colonel John Joicey to purchase a site opposite Barras Bridge, and it was presented to the society. Built finally and opened in 1884, John Hancock was responsible for much of the reorganisation of the new museum. Hancock also prepared flat skins for the collection and received specimens from as far as India through correspondents including Edward Blyth. The museum contains many specimens from their collections. Hancock's collection includes the specimen of red-necked nightjar Caprimulgus ruficollis shot near Killingworth, Northumberland, on 5 October 1856, the first and still the only record of this species in Britain. Suspicions of an error in the records or even of willful fraud have been dismissed, as Hancock was careful in recording collection information. In some specimens, such as an alpine swift without location information, he even noted the fact that it was missing accurate location information. Hancock was also the first to record the breeding of the black redstart in Britain in 1845. The museum came to be called the Hancock Museum in 1890 after the death of John Hancock.

== Taxa described by him ==
- See Category:Taxa named by John Hancock (ornithologist)
