= Albany Hancock =

English naturalist and biologist

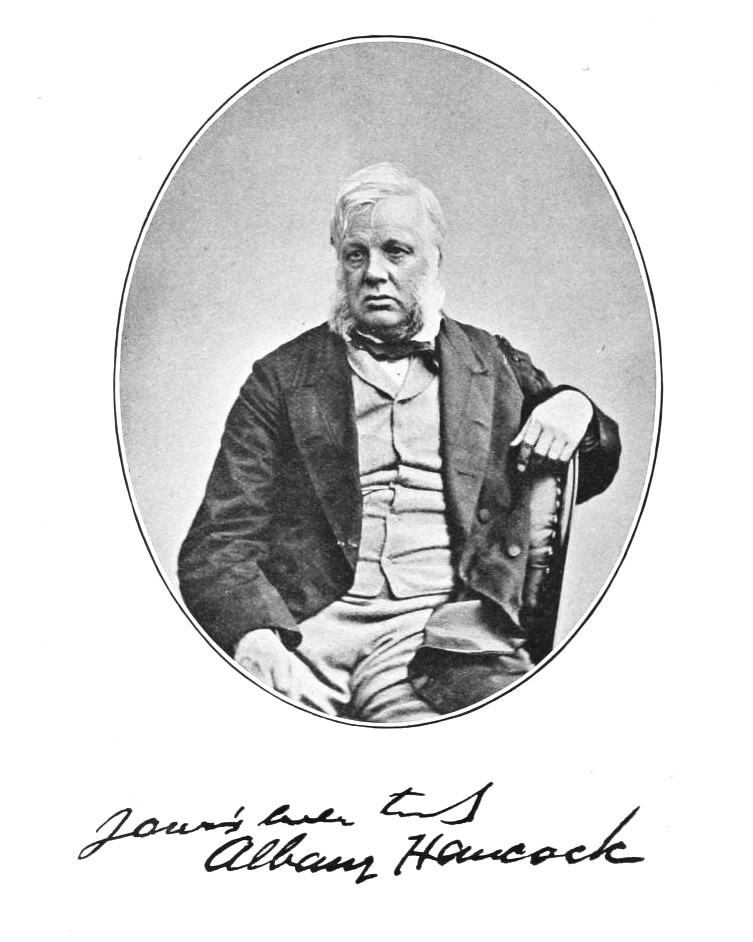

Albany Hancock (24 December 1806 – 1873), English naturalist, biologist and supporter of Charles Darwin from Newcastle upon Tyne. He is best known for establishing a museum along with his brother John and for his works on marine animals and coal-measure fossils.

== Life and work ==
Albany Hancock was born in Newcastle. His father John was also interested in natural history and on his death in 1812, when Albany was just six, his collections were retained and maintained by their mother. Their grandfather Thomas Hancock was a saddler and ironmonger. Three of the children, John, Mary, and Albany took an interest in natural history and John became particularly famous thanks to the exhibition of his work at the Great Exhibition of 1851. His childhood influences included a botanist Robertson, the ornithologists Wingate, Thomas Bewick and Joshua Alder. He showed skills at dissection and drawing and he helped Alder with his catalogue of land and freshwater shells (1830). He wrote his first notes in Jardine's Magazine of Zoology and Botany in 1836. The brothers lived with their sister, Mary Jane, at 4 St. Mary's Terrace, Newcastle, now part of a listed terrace at 14-20 Great North Road.

Hancock was educated at The Royal Grammar School, before becoming a trainee for a local solicitor. He completed the expected period in articles and passed all the required examinations to become a solicitor himself, even going so far as to acquire an office in Newcastle with a view to establishing his own practice. Hancock's interests lay elsewhere, and after a brief period of employment with a manufacturing firm, dedicated the rest of his life to his true calling, natural history. He influenced many other naturalists such as J. W. Kirkby whose mother was a cousin, and George Stewardson Brady. Other collaborators included Thomas Atthey (1814-1880), Richard Howse, A. M. Norman, and Dennis Embleton.

== Publications ==
Although Hancock was an enthusiastic amateur naturalist from childhood, his first serious publications did not appear until 1836, when he was 30. These were a note on the occurrence of Raniceps trifurcatus on the Northumberland Coast and notes on Falco rufipes, Motacilla neglecta, Regulus ignicapillus and Larus minutus in Jardine's Magazine of Zoology and Botany.

From this slow start, Hancock went on to become one of the foremost naturalists of his day, producing some seventy notable publications many in the Annals and Magazine of Natural History.

Hancock was a founder member of the Natural History Society of Northumberland, Durham, and Newcastle upon Tyne, and of the Tyneside Naturalists' Field Club. He was a member of the provisional board that established the College of Physical Science in Newcastle, a Fellow of the Linnean Society, a corresponding-member of the Zoological Society of London and an honorary member of the Imperial Botanico-Zoological Society of Vienna. He was awarded the Royal Medal of the Royal Society in 1858.

== Hancock Museum ==
The Hancock Museum in Newcastle upon Tyne is named after the Hancock brothers, both of whom took an instrumental part in getting the museum built. The museum contains many specimens from their collections.

== Bibliography ==
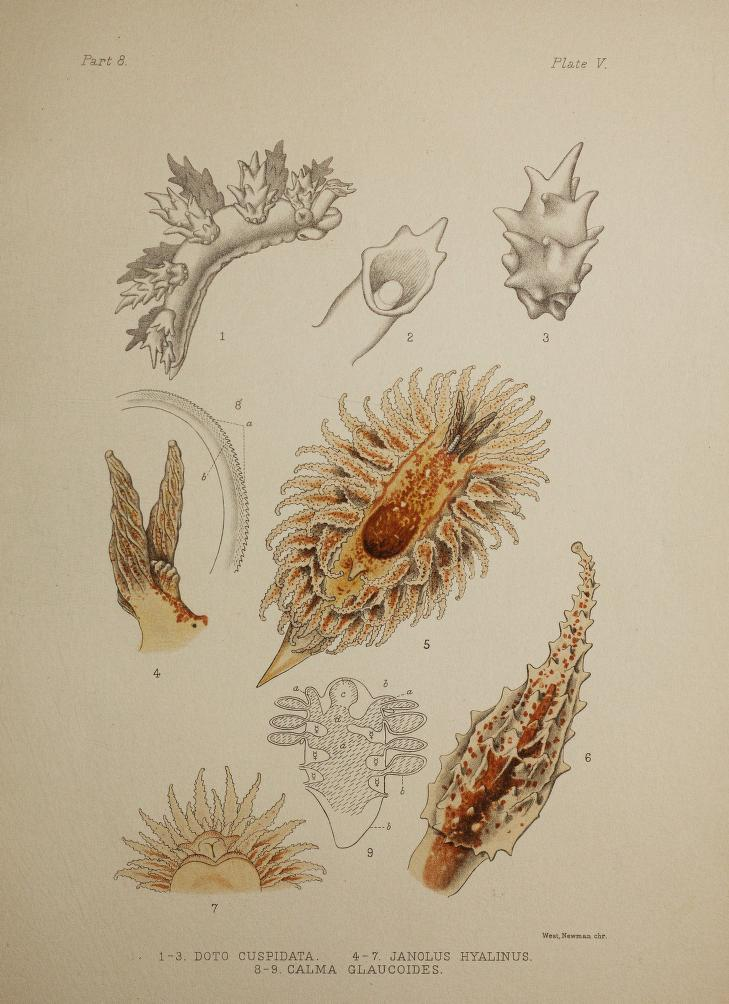
Plate from A monograph of the British nudibranchiate Mollusca

- Alder J. & Hancock A. (1845-1855). A monograph of the British nudibranchiate Mollusca: with figures of all the species. The Ray Society, London. Published in 8 parts:
  - Alder J. & Hancock A. (1845) part 1.
  - Alder J. & Hancock A. (1846) part 2.
  - Alder J. & Hancock A. (1847) part 3.
  - Alder J. & Hancock A. (1848) part 4.
  - Alder J. & Hancock A. (1851) part 5.
  - Alder J. & Hancock A. (1854) part 6.
  - Alder J. & Hancock A. (1855) part 7.
  - Eliot E. (1910) part 8 (suppl.)

== Taxa described by him ==
- See Category:Taxa named by Albany Hancock
