= Harry Ferris Brazenor =

British taxidermist (1863–1948)

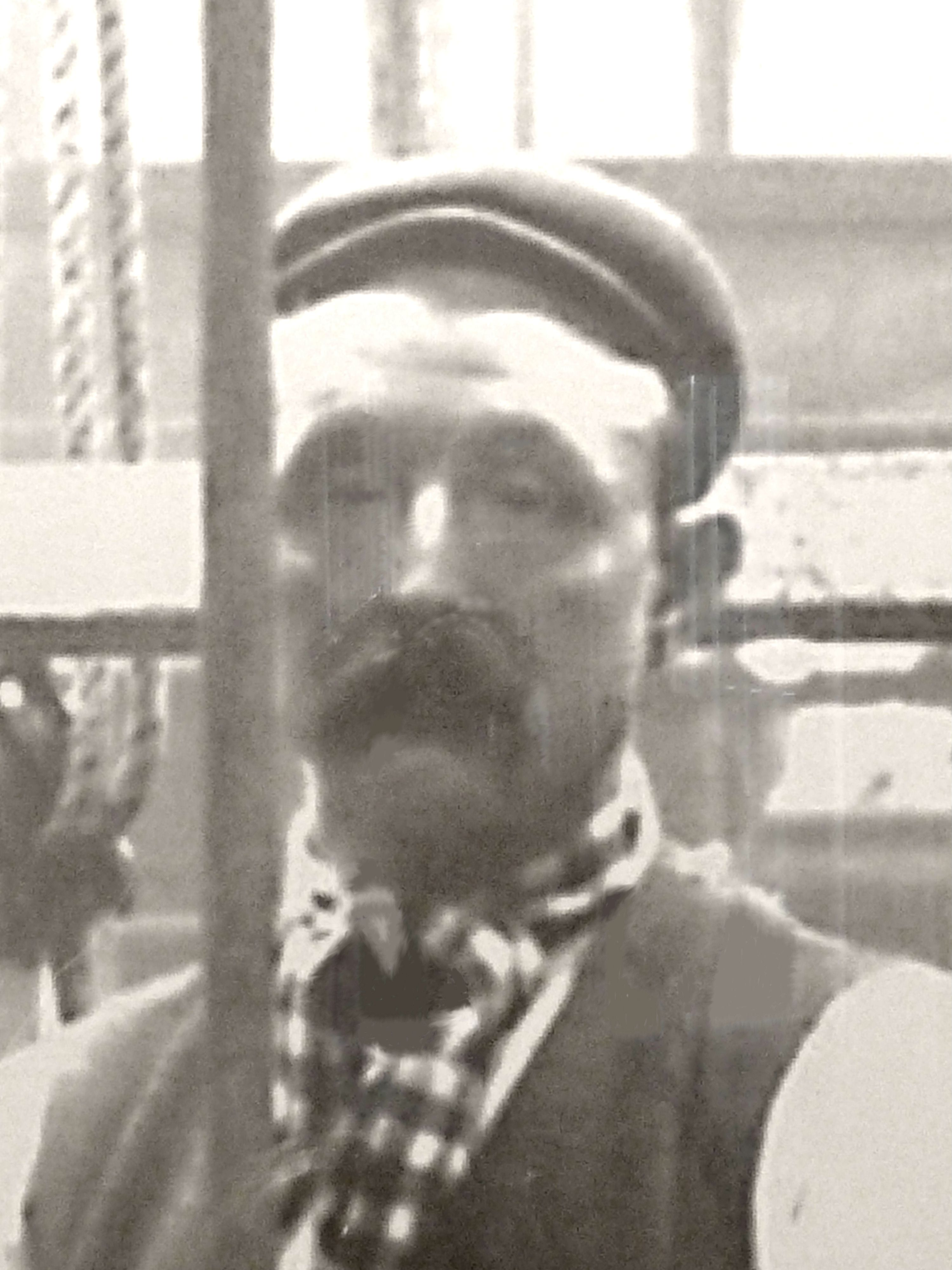
- Harry Brazenor, Manchester Museum, 1898
- Born: 21 July 1863; Shepherd's Bush, London, UK
- Died: 10 March 1948 (aged 84); Eccles, Greater Manchester, UK
- Occupation: Taxidermist
- Years active: 1880s–1930s
- Known for: Taxidermy at Salford and Manchester museums
- Notable work: Manchester sperm whale, Salford tiger

Harry Ferris Brazenor (21 July 1863 – 10 March 1948) was a British taxidermist. He was known especially for his work for Manchester and Salford museums, besides other institutions in Northern England. At Manchester Museum he was recognised for his taxidermy-mounted sperm whale skeleton, giraffe, polar bear, and a wolf with painted "blood" on its teeth. His work for Salford Museum included an Asian elephant displayed next to a tiny shrew. His Salford tiger was transferred to Leeds City Museum and is still displayed there. For Hancock Museum at Newcastle upon Tyne he mounted a bison bull, and for the former Belle Vue Zoological Gardens he mounted an Indian rhinoceros.

He was born into a family of taxidermists. His father, Robert Wilding Brazenor, founded the taxidermy company Brazenor Brothers in Brighton in 1863, the year Harry was born, and Harry began his career with the family firm, alongside his brothers. His nephew H.C.F. Brazenor was deputy director of Brighton Museum & Art Gallery and Brighton Pavilion.

== Background ==
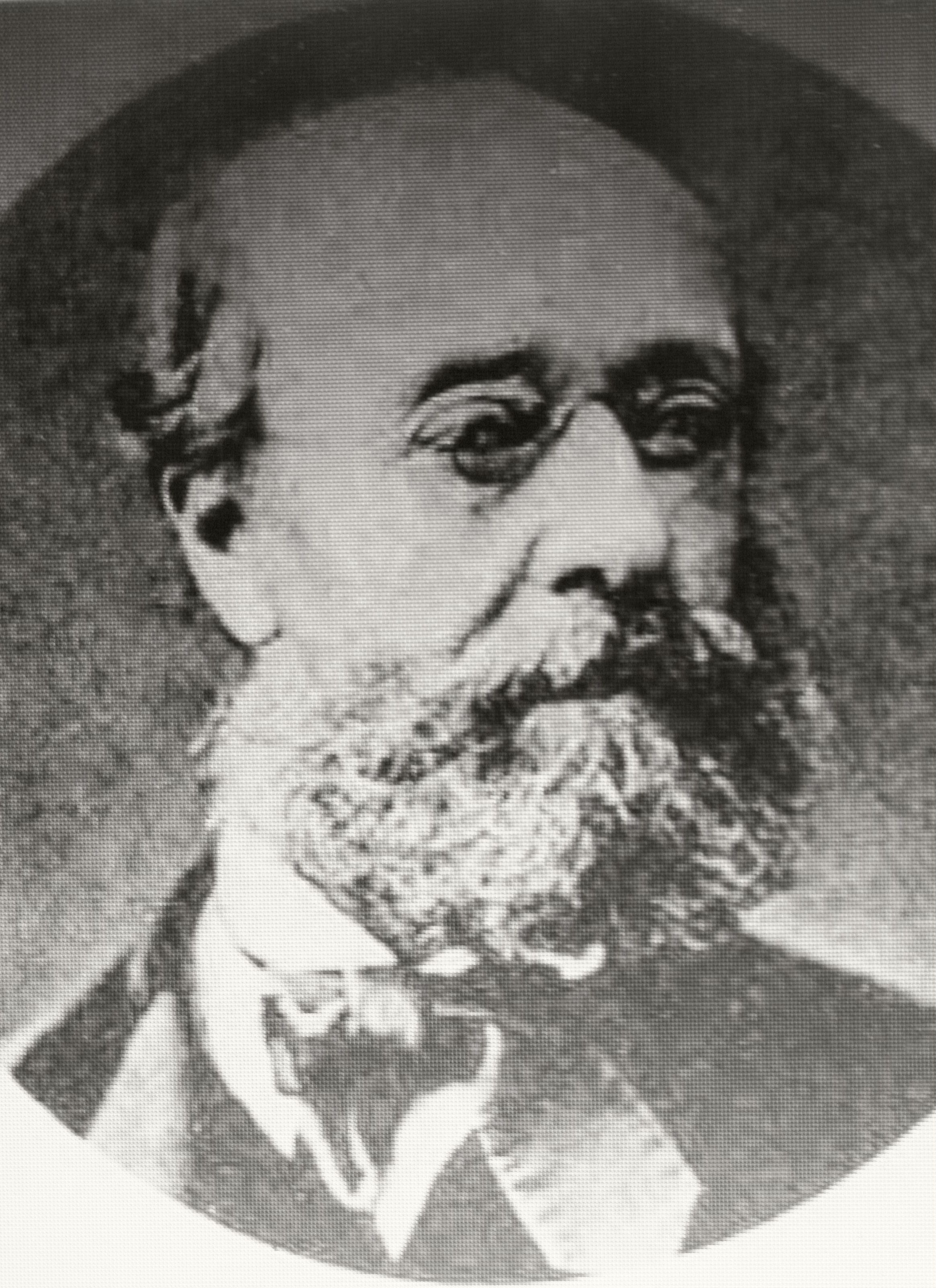
Brazenor's father, taxidermist R.W. Brazenor

Harry Ferris Brazenor was born on 21 July 1863 in Shepherd's Bush, London, into a family of taxidermists and furriers. (Note: General Record Office reference: Births Sep 1863 Brazenor Harry Ferris Kensington vol.1a p.142) His parents were Robert Wilding Brazenor (Shrewsbury 1818 – Lewes 1901), (Note: General Record Office reference: Dec 1901 Brazenor Robert 83 Lewes vol.2b p.101) and Rhoda Ferris (Biddestone c.1826 – Brighton 1909). (Note: General Record Office reference: Marriages Sep 1850 Brazenor Robert Wilding and Rhoda Ferris Aston vol.XVI p.289. Deaths Sep 1909 Brazenor Rhoda Ferris 83 Brighton vol.2b p.126) Robert was a "more enthusiastic than accurate" taxidermist who founded the Brighton taxidermy company, Brazenor Brothers, which flourished from 1863 to 1937, although he became bankrupt in 1883. Much of the Brazenor Brothers' ornithological work is kept in the skeleton gallery of the Booth Museum of Natural History, Brighton. However, in August 1848, before Robert married Harry's mother, he had been charged with stealing a large number of saddlery materials and products from one Edward Tyrrell of Warwick. Robert and Rhoda's sons John, Charles, Frederick, Harry and Alfred all became taxidermists for the family company, and their daughters Sarah and Rhoda worked with their mother in the family furrier shop. Harry's brother Alfred ultimately became the "mainstay" of the business, and Harry's nephew Herbert Clifton Ferris Brazenor (Brighton 26 March 1912 – Brighton 1972) (Note: General Record Office reference: Births Jun 1912 Brazenor Herbert C.F., mother surname Hedges, Brighton vol.2b p.389. Deaths Sep 1972 Brazenor Herbert Clifton F. (birth 26 March 1912) Brighton vol.5h p.320) became deputy director of the Brighton Museum & Art Gallery, and of Brighton Pavilion.

Brazenor married Mary Helen Smith (Manchester 13 October 1859 – Eccles 1945) in Manchester in 1890, (Note: General Record Office reference: Births Dec 1859 Smith Mary Helen Manchester vol.8d p.223. Marriages Sep 1890 Brazenor Harry and Mary Helen Smith Manchester vol.8d p.410. Deaths Mar 1945 Brazenor Mary H. 85 Barton vol.8c p.771) and they had three daughters: Annie Rhoda (born 13 June 1891), (Note: General Record Office reference: Births Sep 1891 Brazenor Annie Rhoda Manchester vol.8d p.239) Florence Helen (born 1893), (Note: General Record Office reference: Births Dec 1893 Brazenor Florence Helen Altrincham vol.8a p.159) and Minnie (born 1894). (Note: General Record Office reference: Births Dec 1894 Brazenor Minnie Altrincham vol.8a p.157) Brazenor died aged 84 in Eccles on 10 March 1948. He was cremated at Manchester Crematorium at Barlow Moor on 13 March 1948. (Note: General Record Office reference: Deaths Mar 1948 Brazenor Harry F. 84 Barton vol.10b p.325)

== Career ==
By 1881, when Brazenor was around 18 years old, he was a taxidermist's assistant, living with his parents in Brighton. By 1891, he was running a taxidermy business from home under his own name in Churchgate, Stockport, and living with his wife at 11 Bridge Street, Manchester. By 1901, he was living with his wife and three daughters at 54 Churchgate, Stockport, and was still running the business from home, while contracting for museum work, however the business went bankrupt on 6 February 1901. In 1905, Brazenor won a court case in which he had been unjustifiably sued for mounting the skin of the wrong pet dog. By 1911, Brazenor was an employee of Manchester Museum, and living with his family at Ashlea, Wellington Road, Eccles. At that point his eldest daughter was a dressmaker, and the youngest was an apprenticed tailoress. By 1939, Brazenor had retired, and was still living in Eccles.

== Works ==
=== Belle View Zoological Gardens, Manchester ===
In 1905, Brazenor mounted an Indian rhinoceros for Belle Vue Zoological Gardens.

=== Manchester Museum ===
In 1898, Brazenor spent three weeks assembling the skeleton of an 11-metre (36 ft) juvenile sperm whale which had been beached in Massachusetts in February 1896. It was purchased from the Natural Science Establishment by the director of Manchester Museum William Evans Hoyle in 1897, and shipped from Rochester, New York, via the Manchester Ship Canal to the museum, in three crates. "The whale was suspended from the ceiling of the mammal gallery, where it became an iconic specimen, emblematic of the Museum as a whole".

In 1900, Brazenor mounted two northern fulmars for Manchester Museum. In 1905, he mounted Maggie the giraffe for the museum. This giraffe skin and that of the Indian rhinoceros for Belle Vue Zoo were presented by Messrs Jennison, who managed the zoo. During the early 20th century, Brazenor mounted the Dundee Wolf (an imported skin from Canada via Dundee Museum), giving it a frightening aspect with painted "blood" on its teeth, in accordance with the archetypes of that era. At an unknown date, Brazenor mounted the Manchester Polar Bear, which was imported from the Arctic via Captain Milne of the whaling ship SS Eclipse, and Dundee Museum.

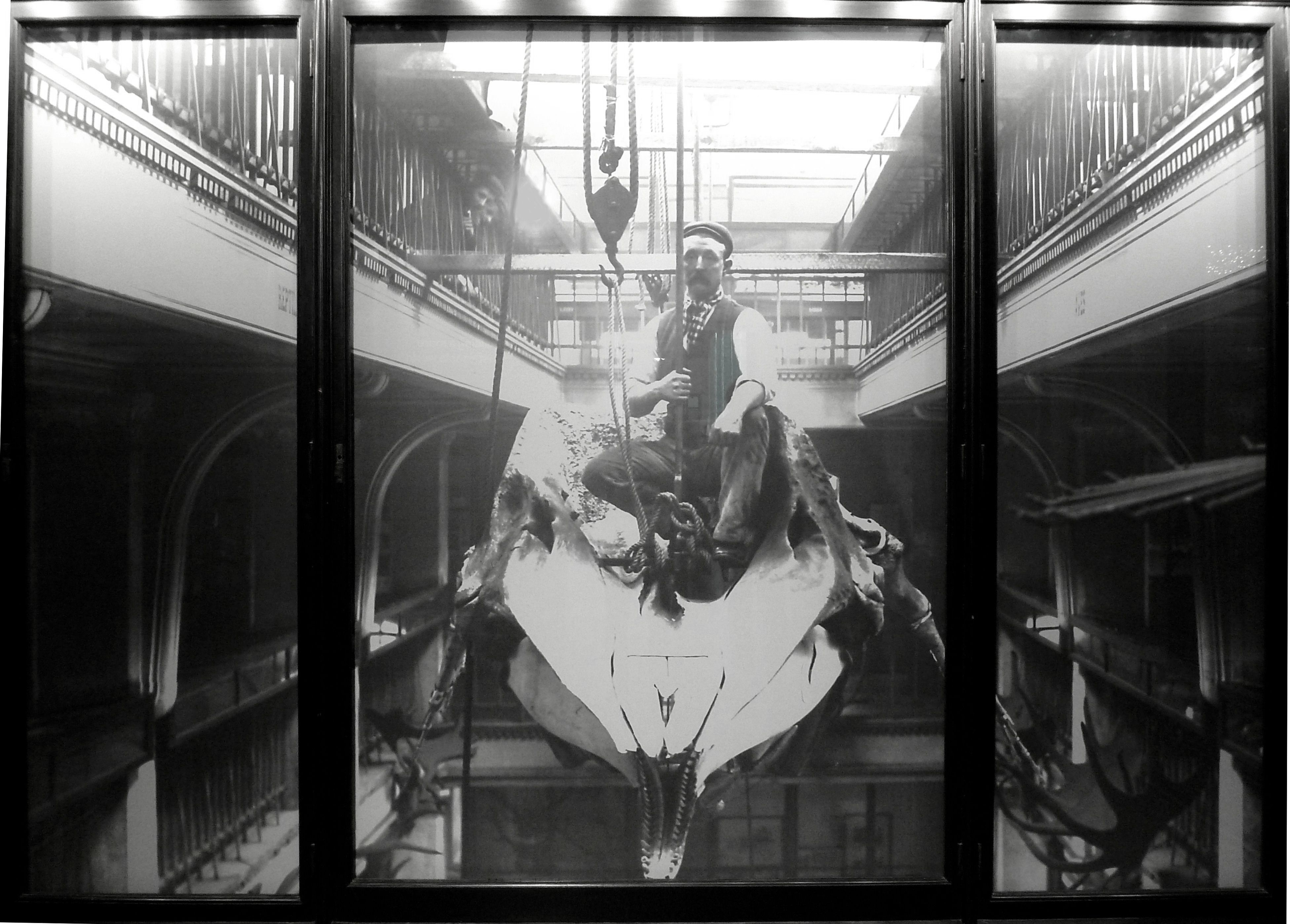
Brazenor sitting atop the Manchester Sperm Whale, 1898 (Manchester Museum)

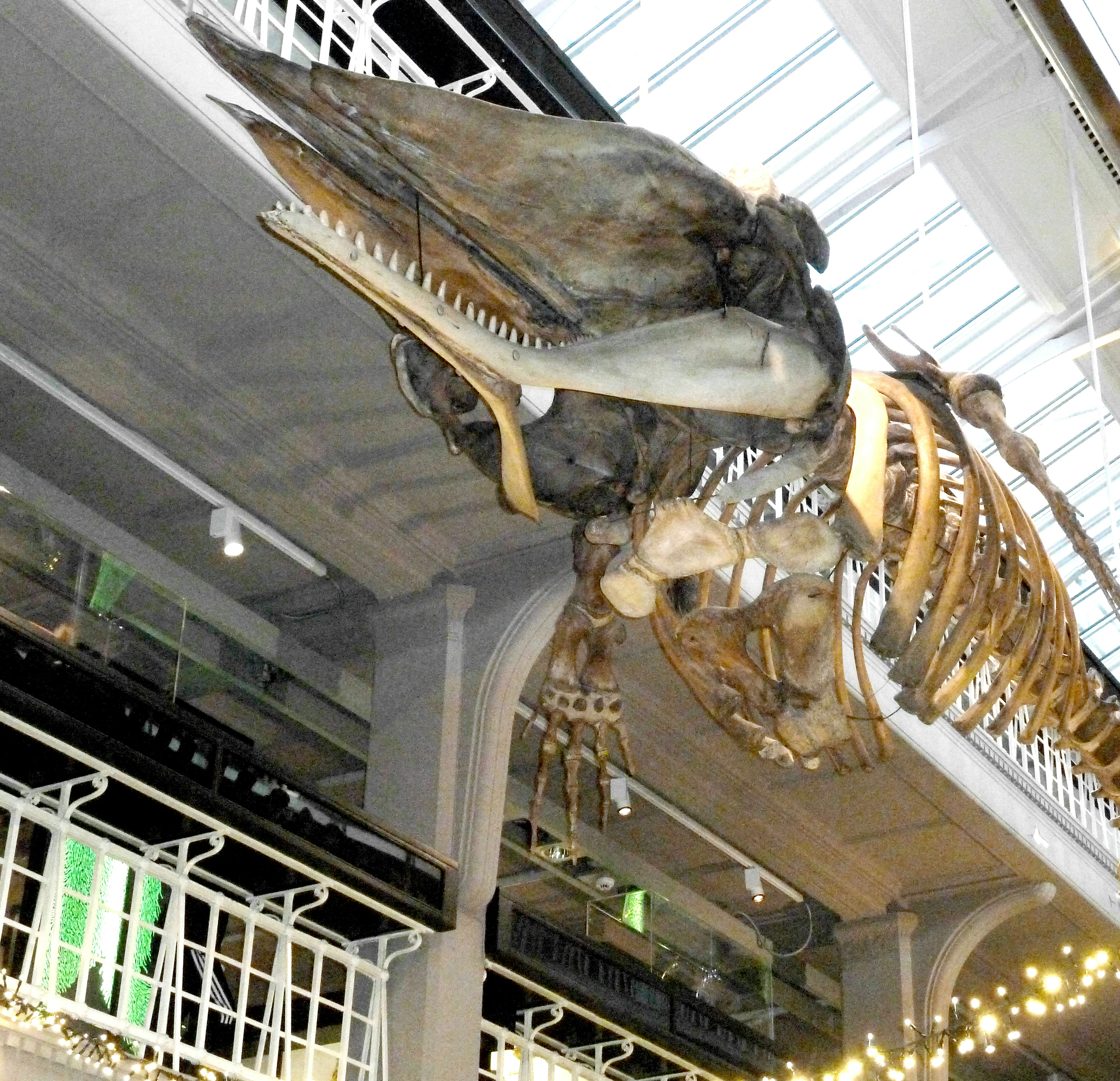
Manchester Sperm Whale, in 2023 (Manchester Museum)

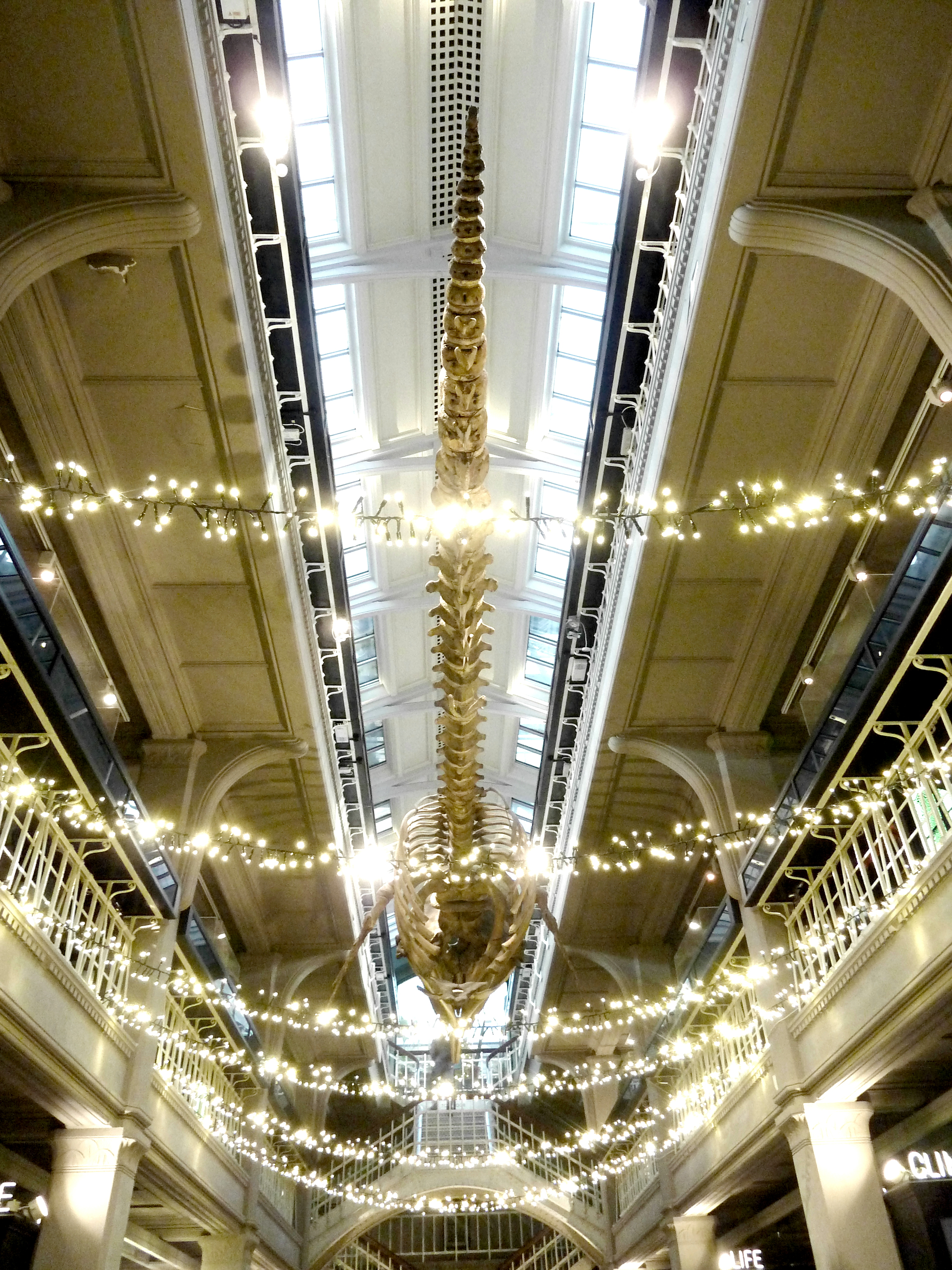
Manchester Sperm Whale, in 2023 (Manchester Museum)

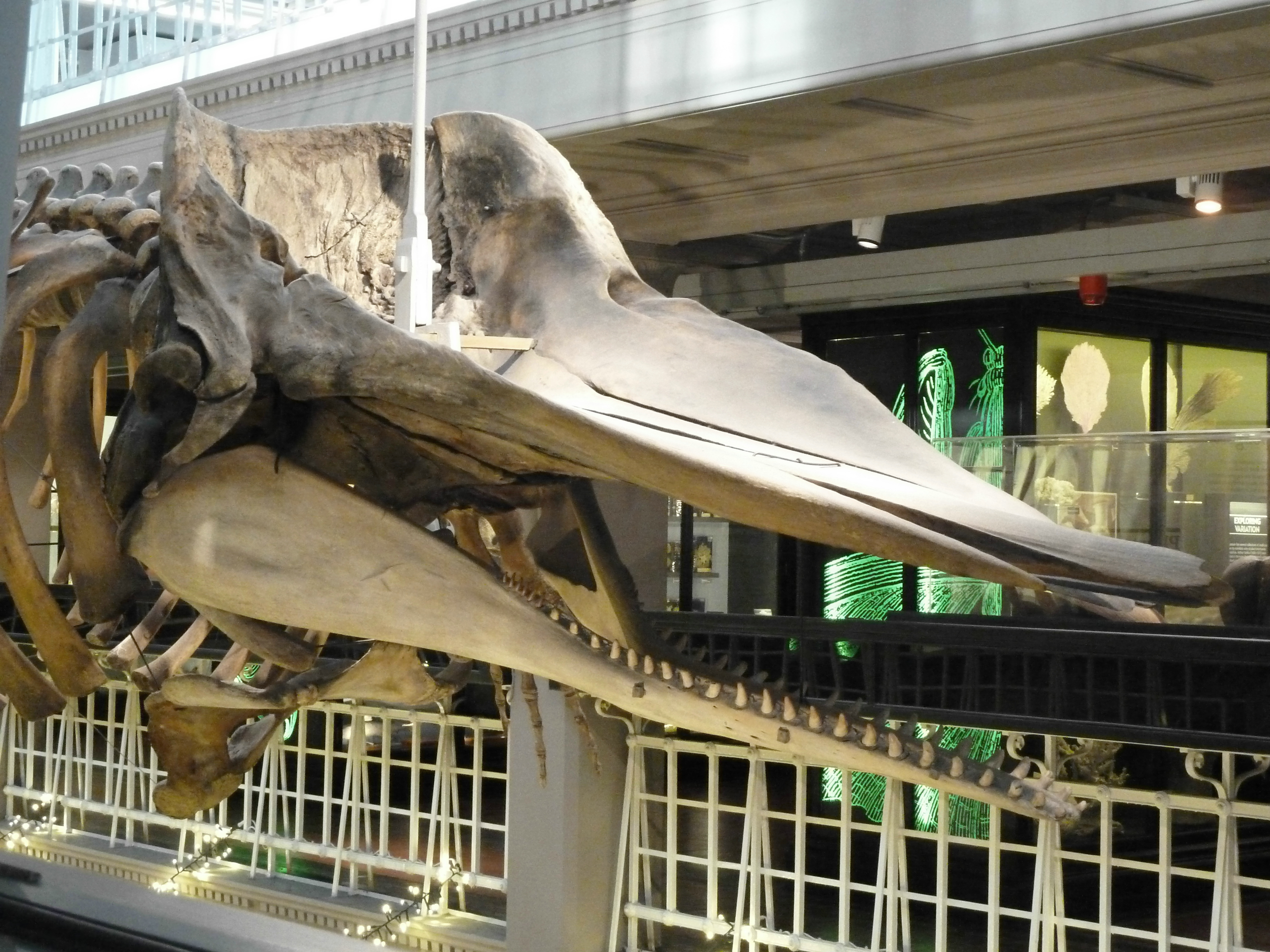
Manchester Sperm Whale, in 2023 (Manchester Museum)

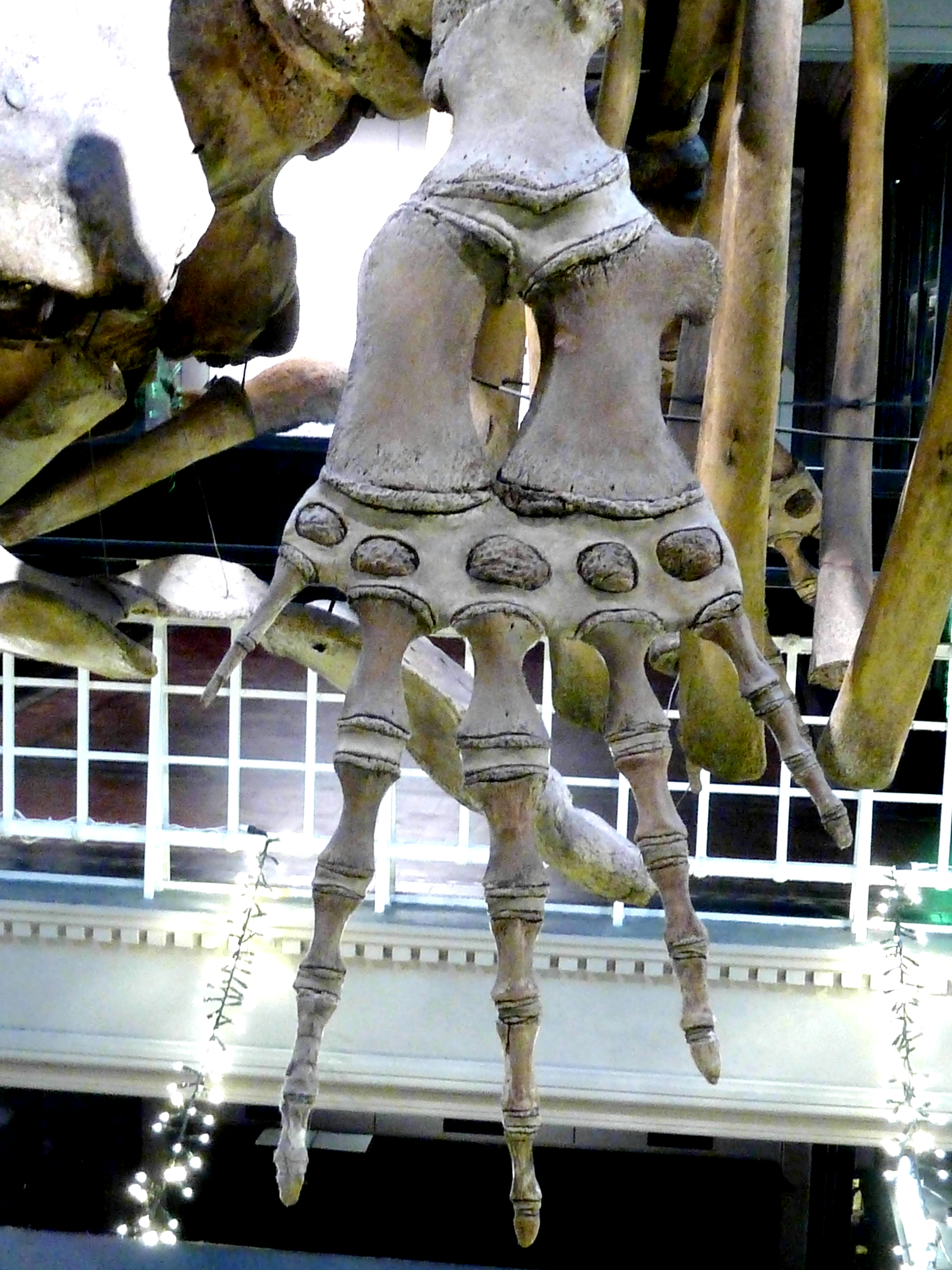
Manchester Sperm Whale fin, in 2023 (Manchester Museum)

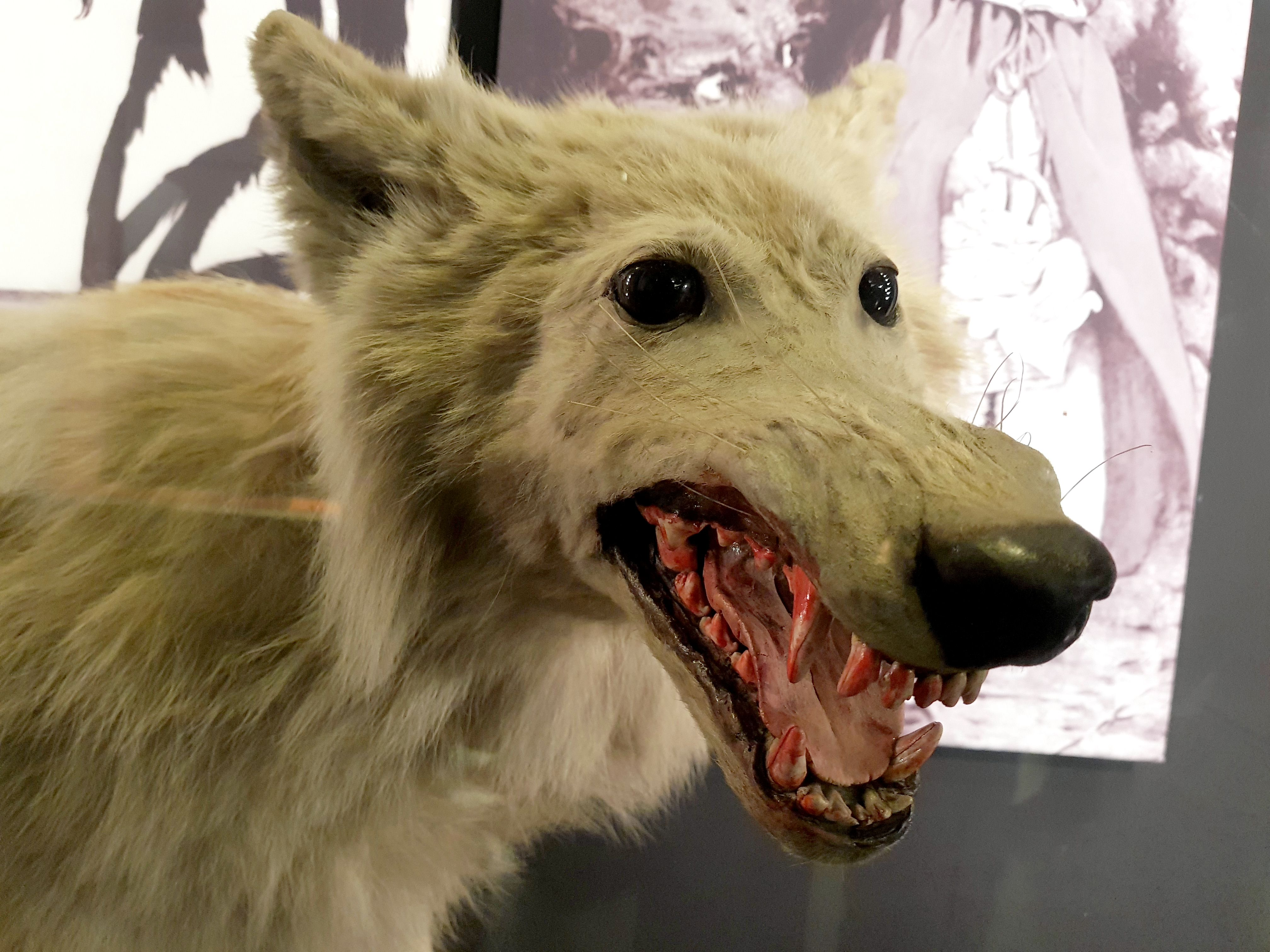
Dundee Wolf with painted teeth, in 2023 (Manchester Museum)

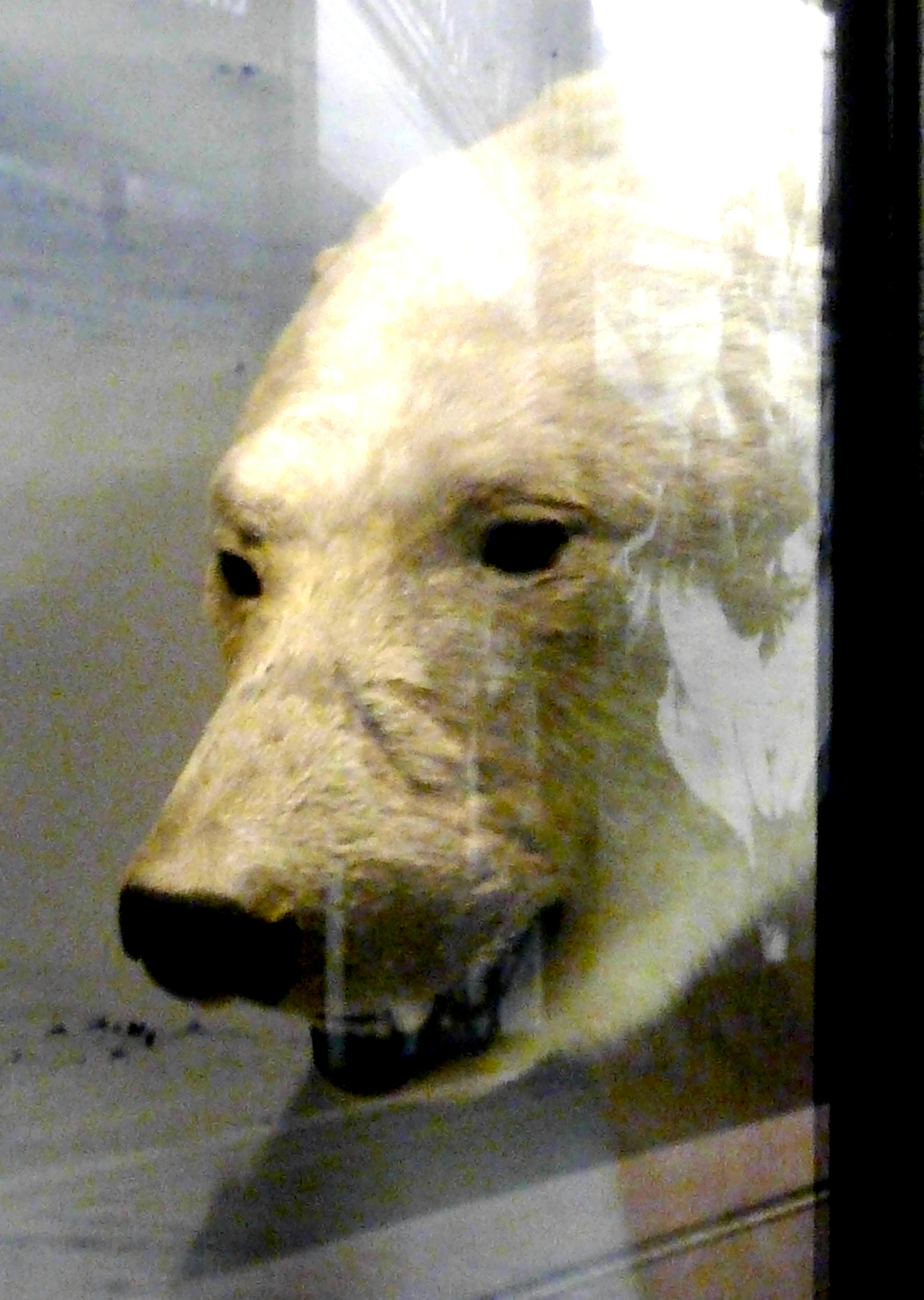
Manchester Polar Bear, in 2023 (Manchester Museum)

=== Salford Museum ===
In 1907, Brazenor mounted an Asian elephant for Salford Museum. This elephant had been imported alive from Burma along with two others in 1895. It lived for twelve years at the Belle Vue Zoological Gardens, giving rides to children: "His docility and urbanity of temper made him valuable as a riding elephant, and he became a great favourite with both children and adults who visited the gardens". The elephant died on 11 December 1906, of peritonitis, and the zoo-owner George Jennison donated the dead specimen to the museum. As a specimen of the largest living land mammal, it was exhibited alongside the smallest living mammal, a shrew. In 1909, Brazenor received praise for his work at Salford Museum:

Under the supervision of Mr Ben H. Mullen, director of the Salford Museums, the natural history collection since being transferred to Buile Hill has been considerably improved by arrangement and judicious additions. In no department perhaps is this so marked as the zoological sections. The elephant, for instance, mounted in such realism, is an attractive and useful exhibit, and presents a striking contrast to the shrew mouse alongside. The work that has been done among the British birds is most effective, and by the re-mounting of old specimens and the addition of new ones a collection once somewhat dilapidated is being raised into an attractive and educationally useful possession for the town. A remarkably fine case is that of marine diving birds arranged on the ledges of a cliff showing eggs, young and adult birds. Opposite this case is another containing a group of the principal wingless birds, ranging in size from the ostrich to the kiwi or apteryx. Several representatives of the Carnivora are handsomely mounted. The lion, tiger, Hymalayan bear, hyena, and puma are in surroundings suggestive of natural environment. In the same room is a large case devoted to the exhibition of a fine collection of heads of big game collected in Rhodesia by Mr Robert E. Hailwood and presented by him to the Natural History Museum of his native town. The collection is one which any museum might be proud to possess. Every month this museum increases in importance and attractiveness. The taxidermy, which is of a first-rate order, is being done by Mr Harry Brazenor under the general supervision of Mr Ben H. Mullen. (Note: In 1906 Buile Hill Mansion (now a listed building) in Buile Hill Park opened as a natural history museum. However by World War I it was a military base, and in 1940 it was bombed. It was recently a conference centre renamed Buile Hill Park Hall. Benjamin Henry Mullen (Dublin 1862 – Bournemouth 1925) was a graduate of Trinity College Dublin, Curator and Chief Librarian for Salford Museums, Libraries and Parks Committee, and author of books on art, ethnology and orthography.)

Salford Museum passed all its taxidermy to other museums in 1982. Leeds City Museum received seven examples of taxidermy by Brazenor, from Salford: they are the Salford night monkey, the Salford brown woolly monkey, the Salford orangutan, the Salford Himalayan black bear, the Salford leopard, the Salford tiger (1914), and the Salford wedge-capped capuchin. (Note: Taxidermied exhibits in UK museums are sometimes referred to by their place of origin or place of exhibition, to differentiate them from specimens of the same species in the same collection or other collections)

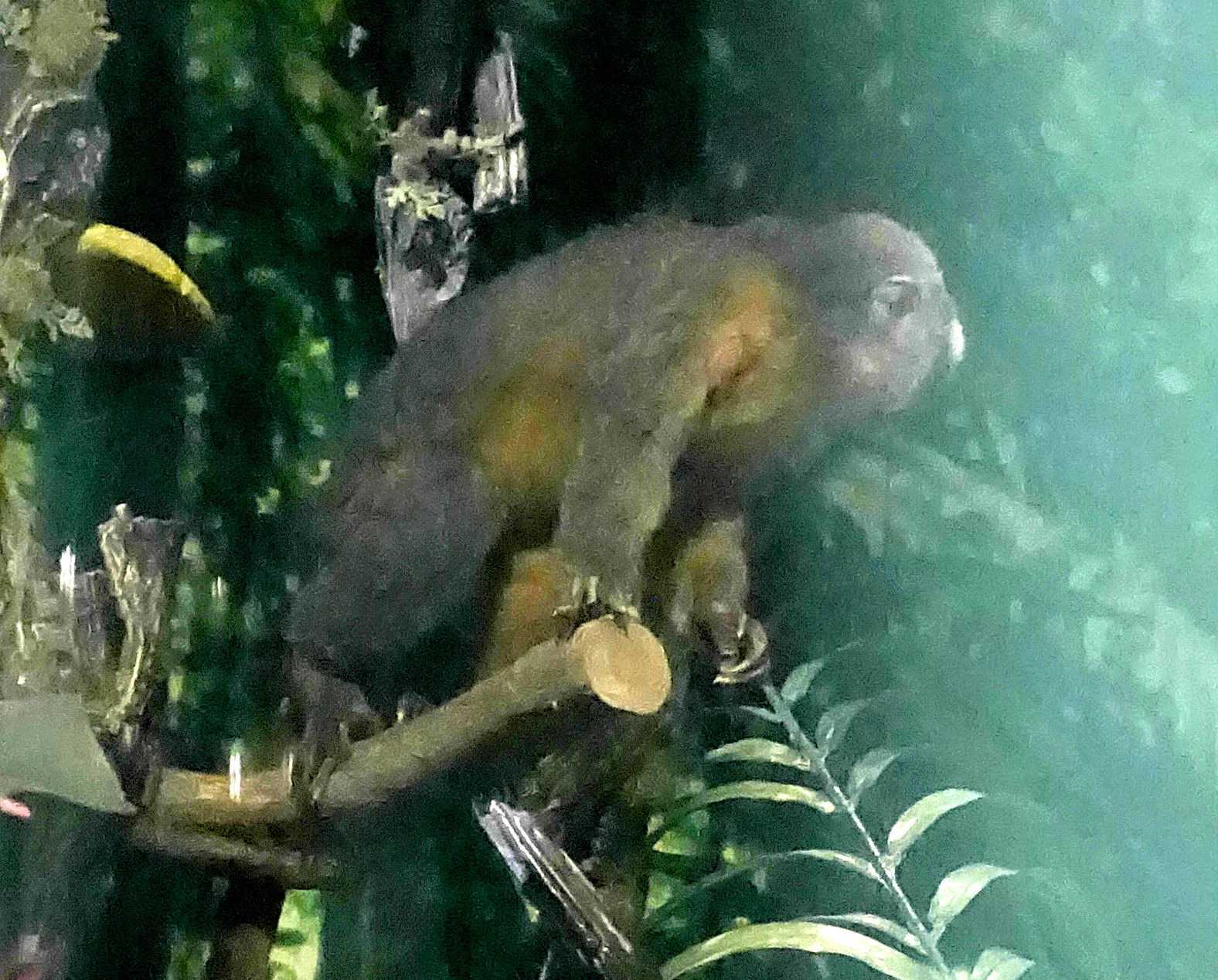
Salford night monkey (Leeds City Museum)

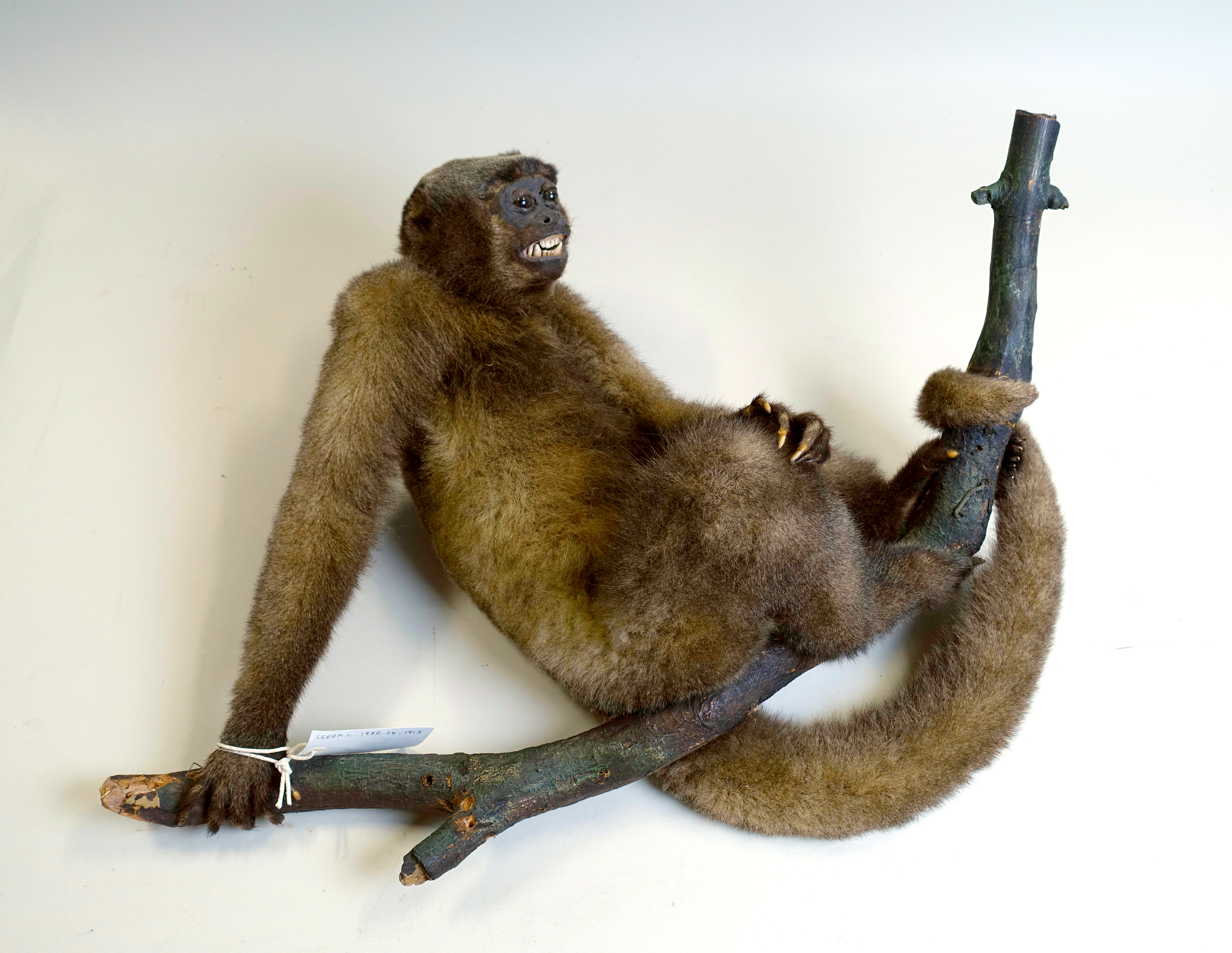
Salford brown woolly monkey (Leeds Discovery Centre)

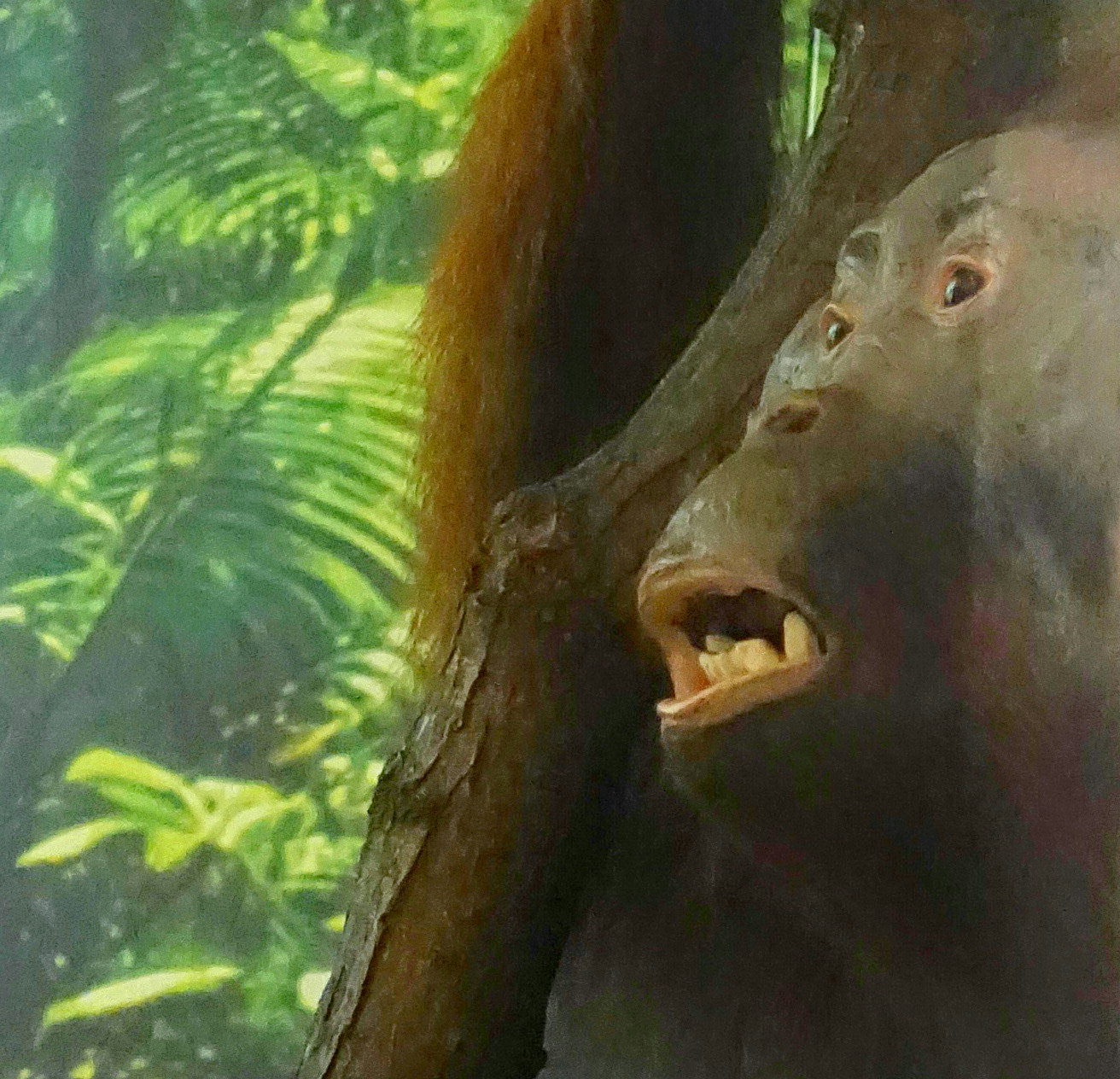
Salford orangutan (Leeds City Museum)

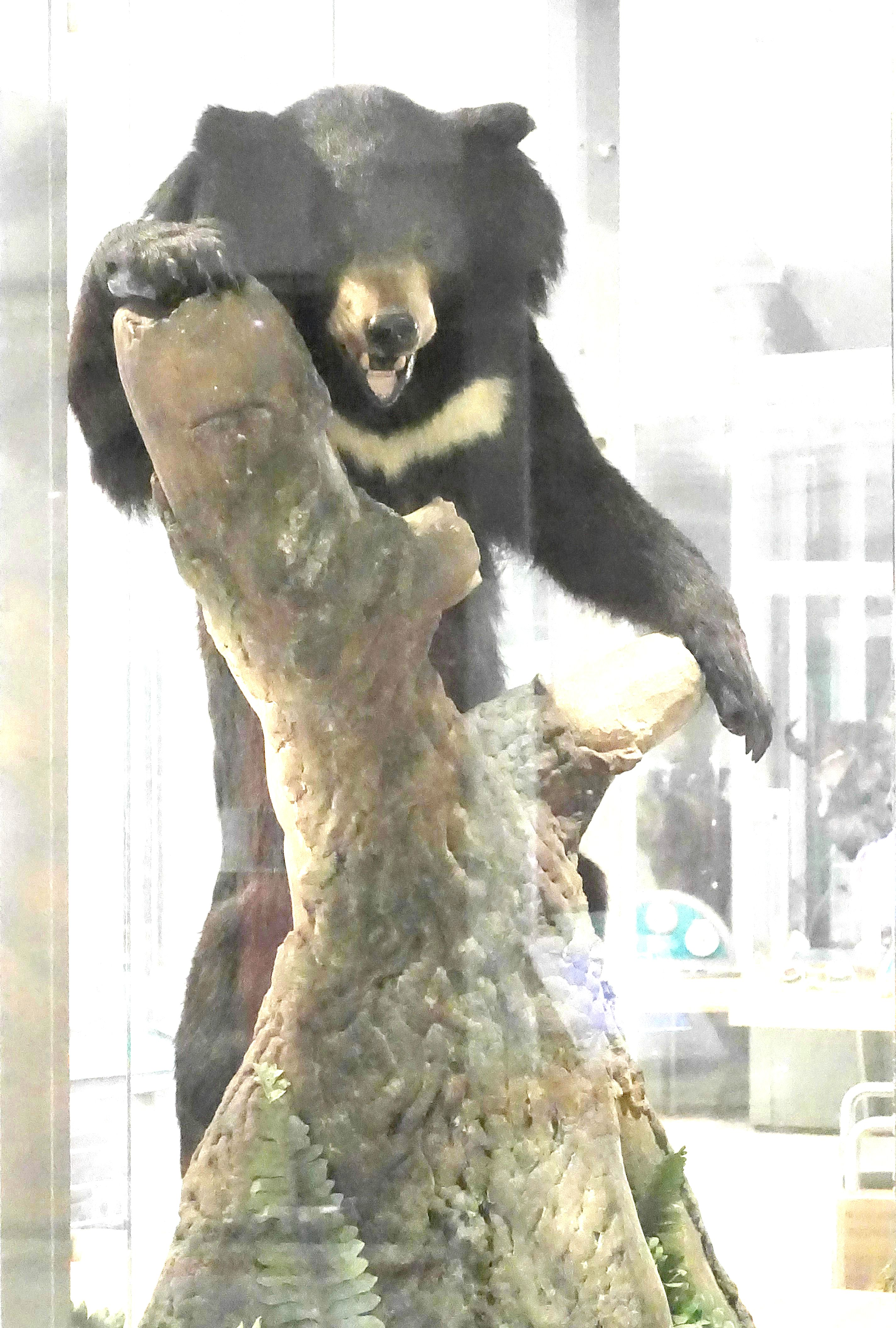
Salford Himalayan black bear (Leeds City Museum)

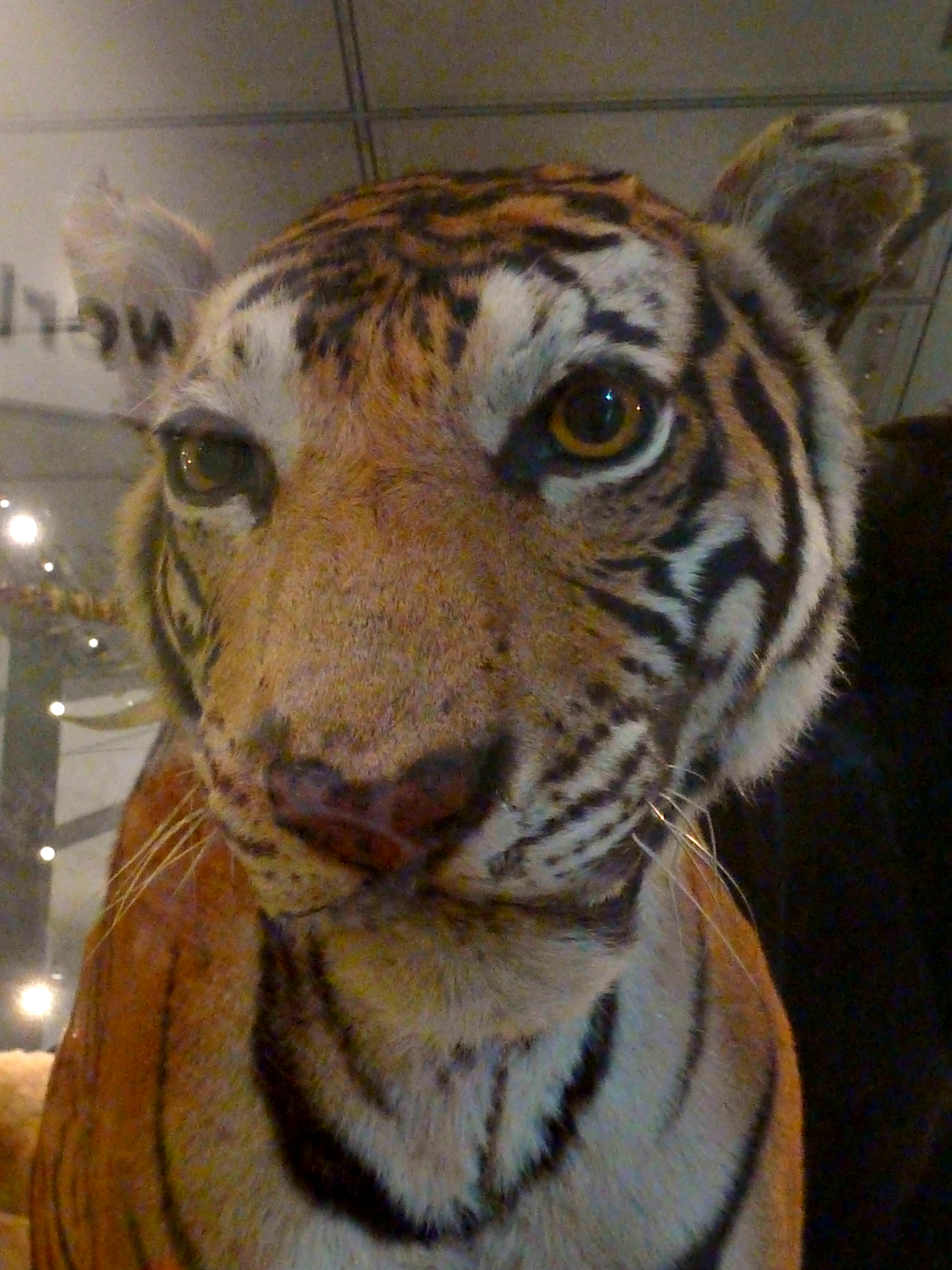
Salford tiger, 1914 (Leeds City Museum)

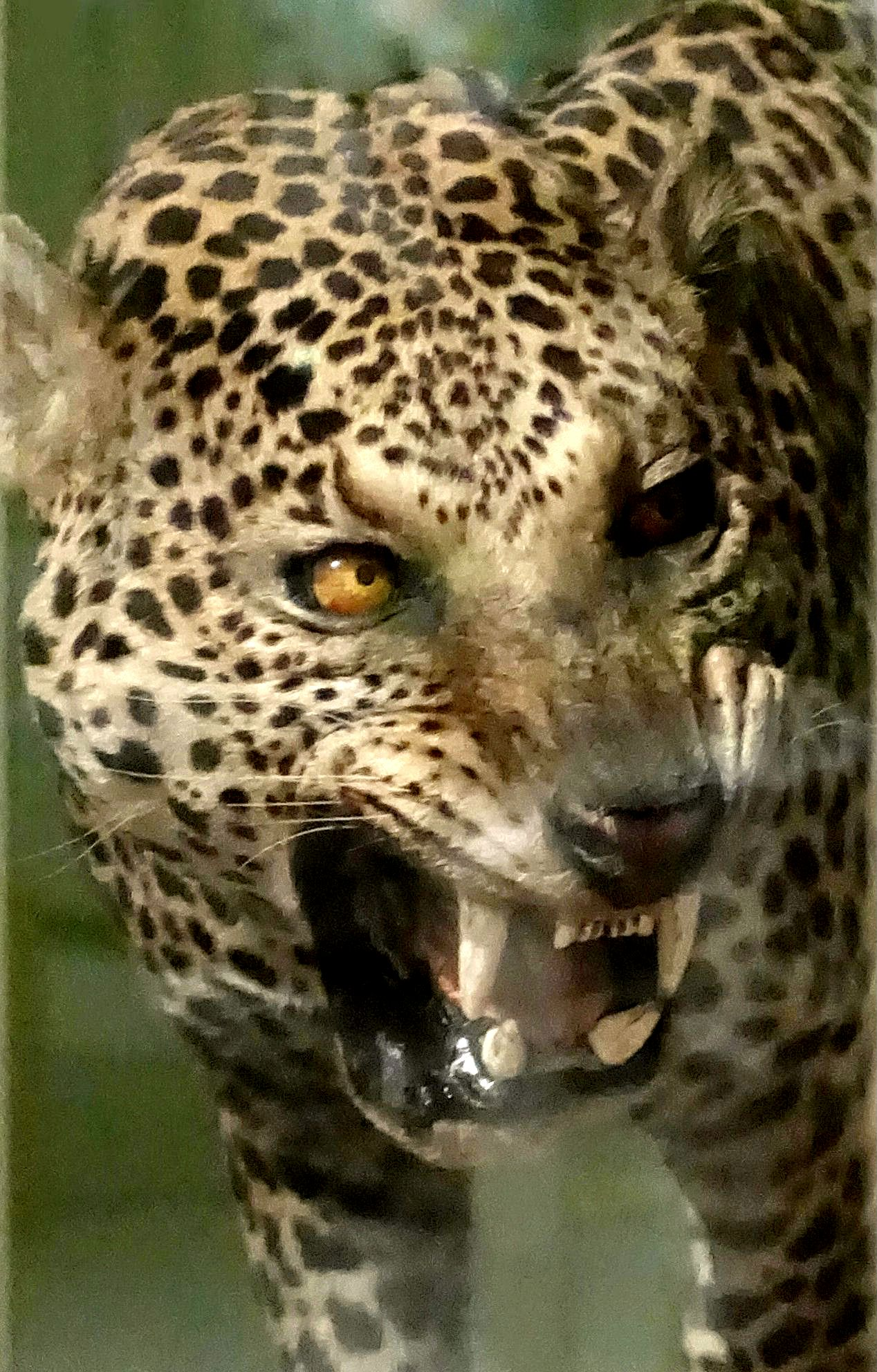
Salford leopard (Leeds City Museum)

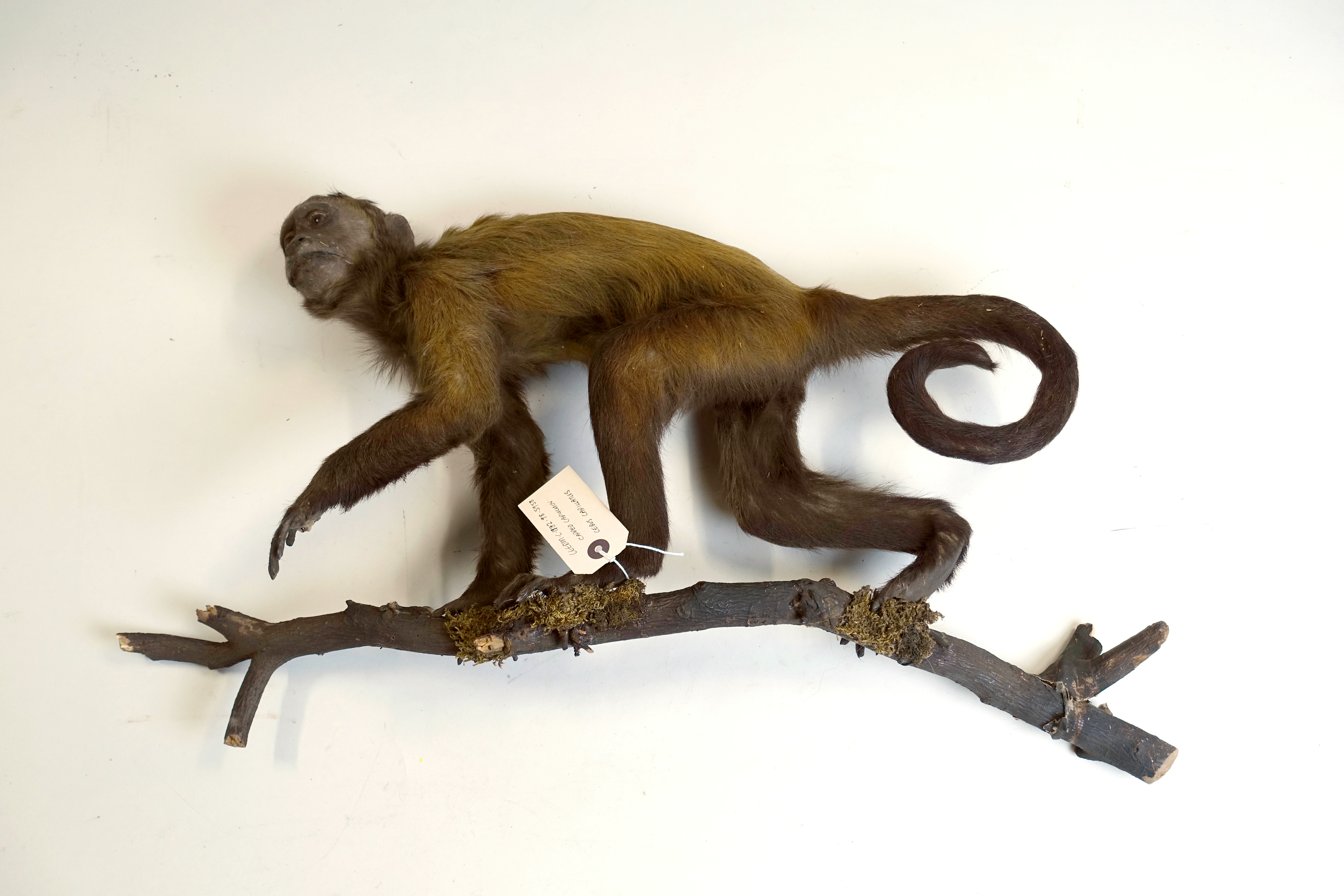
Salford wedge-capped capuchin (Leeds Discovery Centre)

=== Hancock Museum, Newcastle upon Tyne ===
In 1908, Brazenor mounted a "fine bison bull" for Hancock Museum, Newcastle upon Tyne. Museum records describe it as, "American Bull mounted. Old bull, last of original pure stock in herd at Haggerston Castle, Northumberland". In 1905 a bison fund was organised, for the preservation and mounting of the skin.

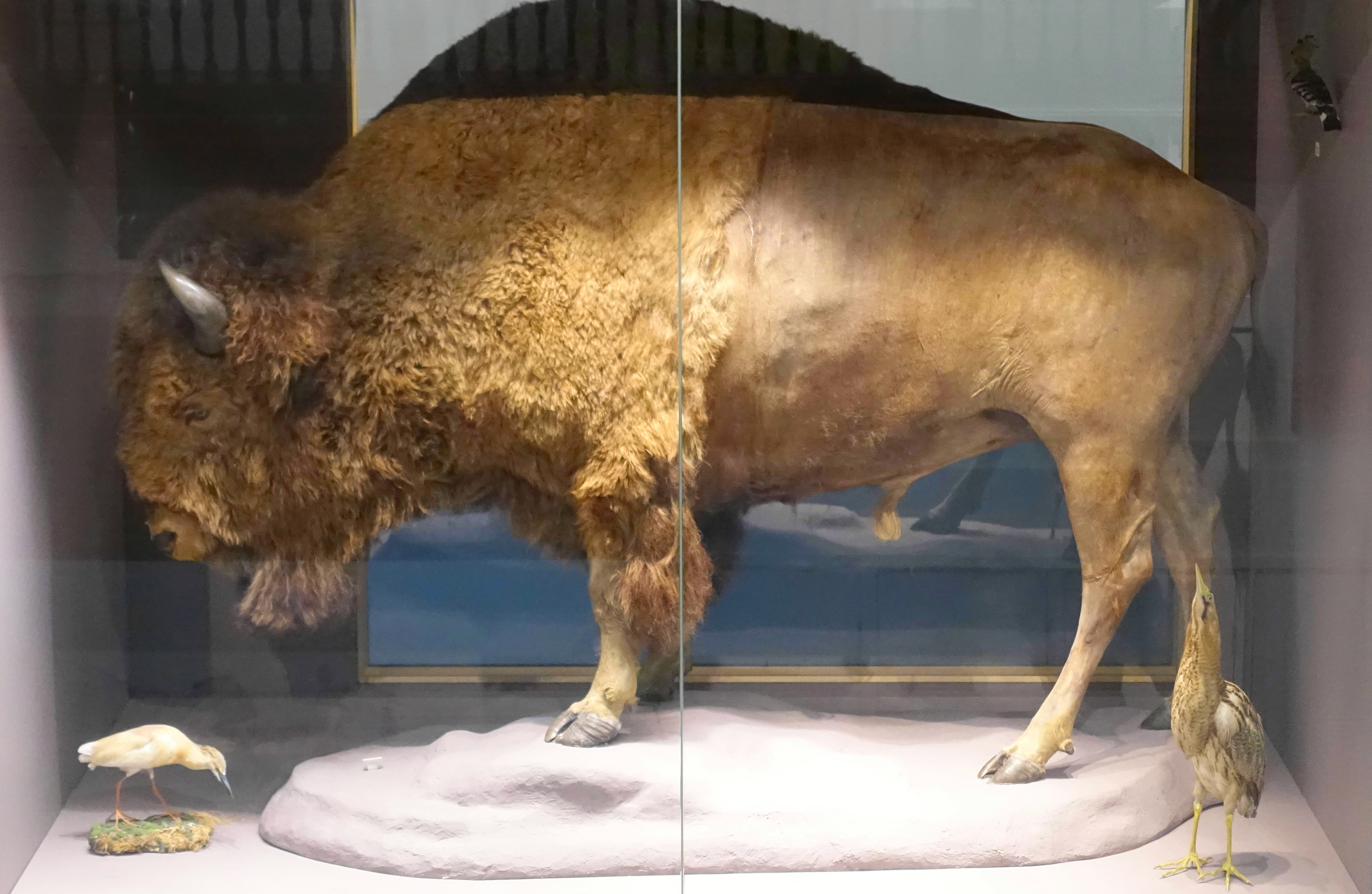
Newcastle bison (Great North Museum: Hancock, Newcastle upon Tyne).

== Purchases ==
Brazenor purchased or otherwise acquired some items for museums. For example, on 28 October 1905 he purchased the skull and lower jaw of a sun bear (Helarctos malayanus) for Manchester Museum.
