= Lindsay Allason-Jones =

20th and 21st-century British archaeologist

- Born: January 1953 (age 73)
- Occupation: Archaeologist

Academic background
- Education: Newcastle University (BA)

Academic work
- Discipline: Archaeology
- Sub-discipline: Roman Archaeology; Roman Britain
- Institutions: Newcastle University; Museum of Antiquities

Lindsay Allason-Jones, OBE, FSA, FSA Scot (born January 1953) is a British archaeologist and museum professional specialising in Roman material culture, Hadrian's Wall, Roman Britain, and the presence and role of women in the Roman Empire. She is currently a visiting fellow at Newcastle University.

== Career ==
Allason-Jones completed her undergraduate degree at Newcastle University in 1974 before working for Chelmsford Excavation Committee. She then worked for Tyne and Wear Museums Service, working on, and subsequently publishing the small finds from Arbeia Roman Fort.

In 1978, she began working at the Museum of Antiquities of Newcastle University and the Society of Antiquaries of Newcastle upon Tyne. She became Newcastle University Director of Museums in 1998, becoming Director the Centre for Interdisciplinary Artefact Studies when the museum was closed in 2009.

Alongside her work in the museum, she was also Reader in Roman Material Culture in the Archaeology Department of Newcastle University.

Between 2003 and 2006, Allason-Jones served as the president of the Royal Archaeological Institute, and again from 2021. She served as the president of the Society of Antiquaries of Newcastle upon Tyne, and still acts as the Keeper of Collections.

Allason-Jones was admitted as a Fellow of the Society of Antiquaries of London in January 1988, and is a Fellow of the Society of Antiquaries of Scotland and the Royal Society of Arts. She was awarded an OBE for services to archaeology in 2014 in the New Year Honours List.

Allason-Jones retired in 2011, and in 2014 an edited volume of papers was published in her honour, containing papers covering the key themes of her career.

Allason-Jones has an extensive publication record on the material culture of Roman Britain and has been involved in the research of archaeological discoveries such as the Rudge Cup, the Corbridge Hoard, and Coventina's Well.

She has appeared in several TV programmes on historical themes, including Time Team (1996–2000), Timewatch (2007), History Cold Case (2011) and Walking Through History (2014), as well as being the historical advisor on the 2011 film The Eagle. In July 2012, she featured as one of the guests on an episode of In Our Time on Radio 4 on the function of Hadrian's Wall.

== Trusteeships ==
Allason-Jones has held many trusteeships, including:

- Clayton Trustees
- Trustees of Corbridge Excavation Fund
- Hadrian's Art Fund
- Marc Fitch
- Society of Antiquaries of Newcastle upon Tyne

== Selected publications ==
- Allason-Jones L., Miket R. 1984. The Catalogue of Small Finds from South Shields Roman Fort. Newcastle upon Tyne: Society of Antiquaries of Newcastle upon Tyne.
- Allason-Jones L., McKay B. 1985. Coventina's Well: a Shrine on Hadrian's Wall. Hexham: Trustees of the Clayton Collection.
- Allason-Jones L., Bishop M. C. 1988. Excavations at Roman Corbridge: the hoard. London: Historic Buildings & Monuments Commission for England.
- Allason-Jones L. 1989. Ear-rings in Roman Britain. Oxford: British Archaeological Reports.
- Allason-Jones L. 1991. In: Holbrook, N., Bidwell P, ed. Roman Finds From Exeter Exeter: University of Exeter
- Allason-Jones L. 1996. Roman Jet in the Yorkshire Museum. York: Yorkshire Museum.
- Allason-Jones L. 1996. 'The actress and the bishop: evidence for working women in Roman Britain'. In: Women in industry and technology from prehistory to the present day: current research and the museum experience (Proceedings from the 1994 WHAM conference). London: Museum of London. pp. 67–75.
- Allason-Jones L. 1999. 'Health Care in the Roman North', Britannia 30, 133–146.
- Allason-Jones L. 2000. The material culture of Hadrian's Wall. In: Limes XVIII: proceedings of the XVIIIth International Congress of Roman Frontier Studies. Amman, Jordan: Archaeopress.
- Allason-Jones L. 2000. Roman Woman: Everyday Life in Hadrian's Britain. London: Michael O'Mara Books Ltd.
- Allason-Jones L. 2001. Material Culture and identity. In: James, S., Millett, M, ed. Britons and Romans: Advancing an Archaeological Agenda. London: Council for British Archaeology. pp. 19–25.
- Allason-Jones L. 2002. Git in Romeins Brittannie. In: Sas, K., Thon, K, ed. Limburg: Bracelet Tongeren, pages: 40–42, 150, 151, 199-2011
- Allason-Jones L. 2006. Women in Roman Britain. York: Council for British Archaeology.
- Allason-Jones L., Hanson W. S., Breeze J. D. 2009 The army and frontiers of Rome : papers offered to David J. Breeze on the occasion of his sixty-fifth birthday and his retirement from Historic Scotland, Portsmouth: Journal of Roman Archaeology.
- Allason-Jones L. 2011. Artefacts in Roman Britain: Their Purpose and Use. Cambridge: Cambridge University Press.
- Allason-Jones L. 2012. "She Said 'Emic'", in (Duggan, M., McIntosh, F., and Rohl, D. J. (eds) TRAC 2011: Proceedings of the Twenty First Theoretical Roman Archaeology Conference, Newcastle 2011. Oxford: Oxbow Books. pp. 4–9. doi:10.16995/TRAC2011_4_9
