= Hatton Gallery =

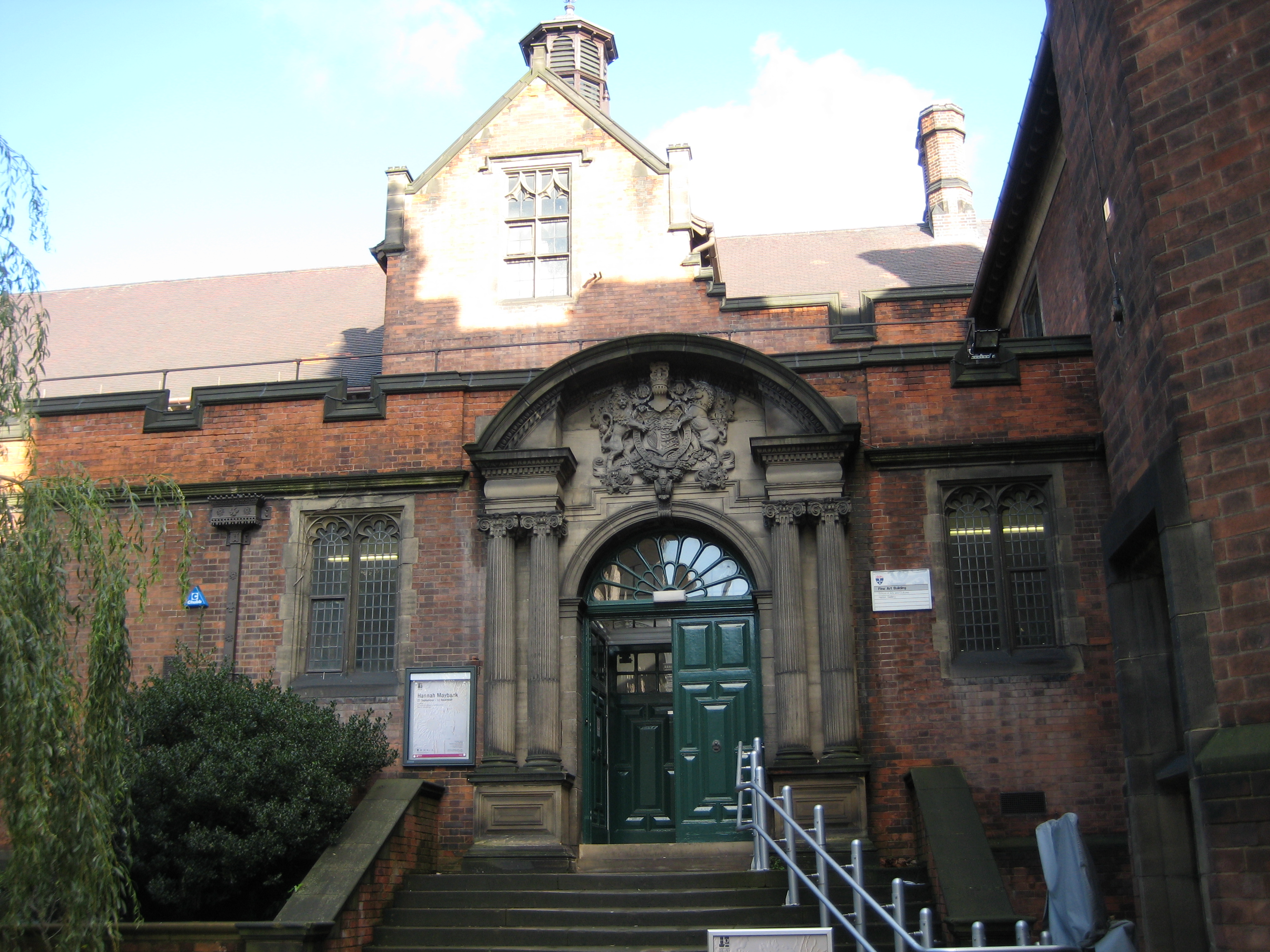
- The Fine Art Building of Newcastle University, home of the Hatton Gallery.
- Established: 1925; 101 years ago
- Location: Newcastle upon Tyne, England
- Coordinates: 54.9796°N 1.6150°W
- Type: Art museum
- Public transit access: Bus, Metro
- Website: www.northeastmuseums.org.uk/hatton

Great North Museum
- Great North Museum: Hancock; Hatton Gallery

The Hatton Gallery is Newcastle University's art gallery in Newcastle upon Tyne, England. It is based in the university's Fine Art Building and part of North East Museums.

The Hatton Gallery closed in February 2016 for a £3.8 million redevelopment and reopened in 2017.

== History ==
The Hatton Gallery was founded in 1925, by the King Edward VII School of Art, Armstrong College, Durham University (Newcastle University's Department of Fine Art), in honour of Richard George Hatton, a professor at the School of Art.

Richard Hamilton's seminal Man, Machine and Motion was first exhibited at the Hatton in 1955 before travelling to the ICA, so the Hatton can claim to have been the birthplace of Pop Art.

In 1997, the university authorities voted to close down the gallery, but a widespread public campaign against the closure, leading to a £250,000 donation by Dame Catherine Cookson, ensured the survival of the gallery.

As part of the Great North Museum project, the gallery's future is secure. Unlike the university's other collections, the Hatton Gallery was not transferred into the Hancock, but remained in the Fine Art Building.

The Hatton Gallery closed on 27 February 2016 for a £3.8 million redevelopment and reopened in October 2017 with the exhibition Pioneers of Pop.

== Exhibitions ==
The permanent collection comprises over 3,500 works, from the 14th century onward – including paintings, sculptures, prints and drawings – and starring the Merzbarn, the only surviving Merz construction by Kurt Schwitters, which was rescued from a barn near Elterwater in 1965 and is now permanently installed in the gallery.

Other important artists represented in the collection include Francis Bacon, Victor Pasmore, William Roberts and Paolo di Giovanni, Palma Giovane, Richard Hamilton, Panayiotis Kalorkoti, Thomas Bewick, Eduardo Paolozzi, Camillo Procaccini, Patrick Heron and Richard Ansdell. Watercolours by Wyndham Lewis, Thomas Harrison Hair and Robert Jobling are also held.

Important exhibitions held in the gallery in recent years include No Socks: Kurt Schwitters and the Merzbarn (1999) and William Roberts (2004).
