= Margaret Rebecca Dickinson =

British botanical artist (1821–1918)

- Born: 22 July 1821; Newcastle upon Tyne, England
- Died: 9 December 1918 (aged 97); Norham, England

Margaret Rebecca Dickinson (1821–1918) was a botanical artist who lived in north-east England and the Scottish Borders. Her watercolour paintings of plants collected around her homes, and other parts of the British Isles are in the archives of the Royal Horticultural Society and the Great North Museum: Hancock. As well as their artistic quality they provide information on how land use in the region has changed since her time.

== Life ==
Dickinson was born in Newcastle-upon-Tyne on 22 July 1821 to William Ogle and Elizabeth (née Davidson) Dickinson, the oldest of their children. Her father was a tobacco and snuff manufacturer in Newcastle. She lived with her parents, three sisters and a brother. Her brother inherited the tobacco business. She did not marry and was of independent means because of the family's wealth.

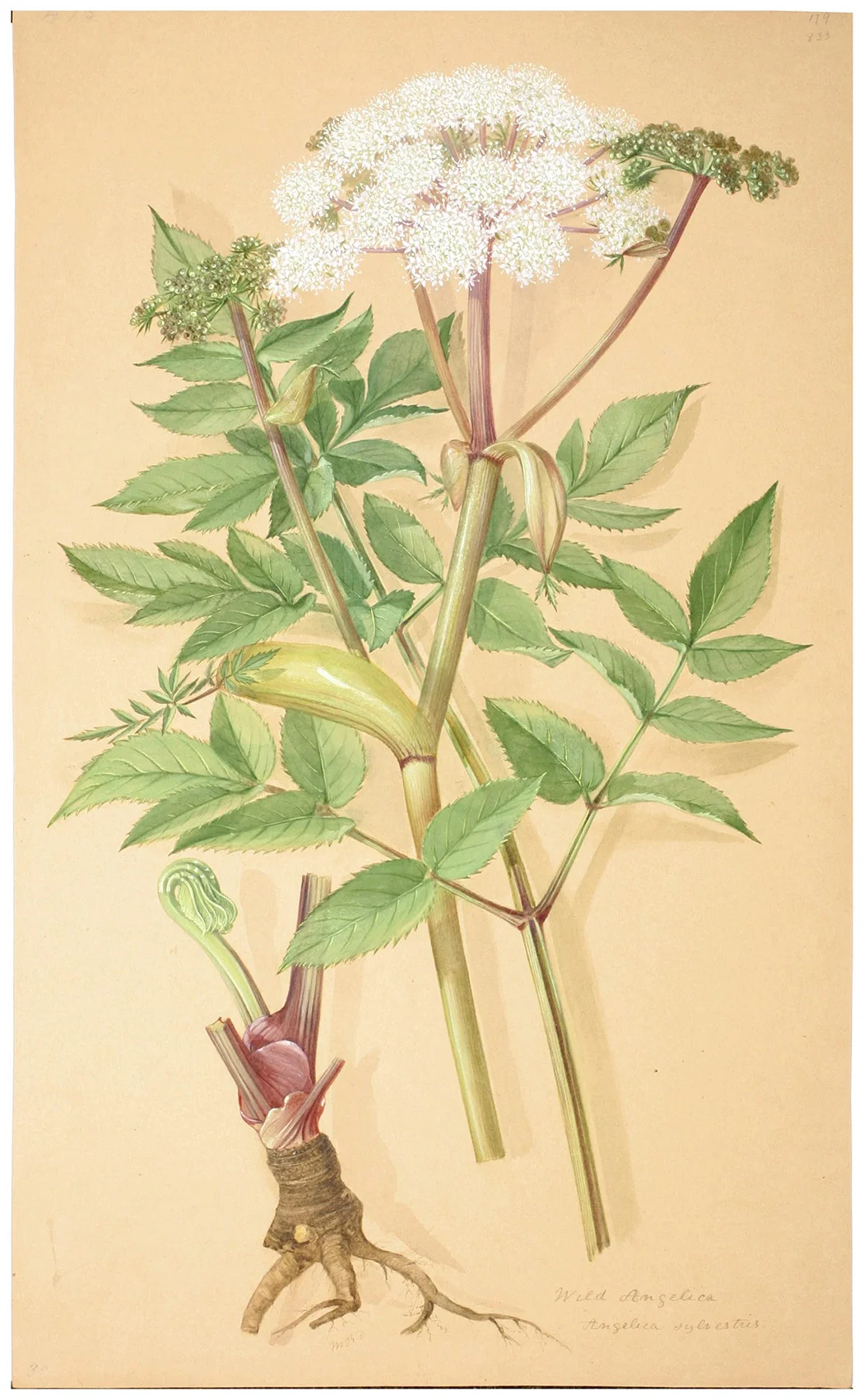
No 413 Wild Angelica

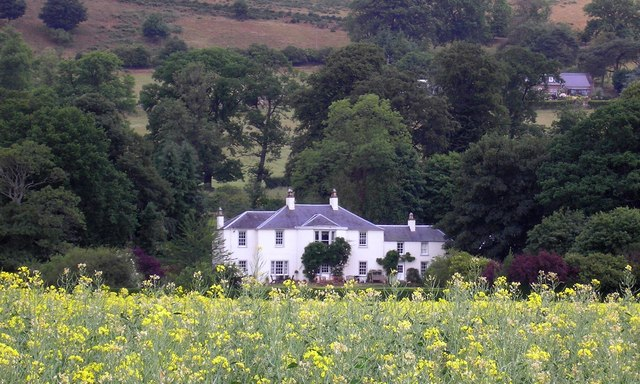
Her family home in Gattonside still stands.

Dickinson made a herbarium with over 1,000 specimens and also produced many drawings and watercolour paintings of wild and cultivated flowers, mostly between 1846 and 1874, although she continuing to paint into the 1890s. Dickinson made use of shading to give her paintings a three-dimensional appearance. She recorded where each came from, and something about them on each painting. She probably travelled to collect the flowers. They were mostly collected in the region around the Newcastle and Scottish Borders where she lived, but some were from North Wales and Upper Teesdale, while others came from Cirencester, Kent, Ireland and Devon. Comparisons of some of her records with later information has shown significant changes in land use. She also made a few drawings of fungal fruiting bodies and mosses.

In the late 1850s her father retired and the family moved to Friar's Hall at Gattonside, near Melrose for a decade.

In 1868 she moved to Norham in Northumberland with her parents and sister. When their parents died during the following two years, the sisters inherited the house (Tweed Villa) and lived there for the rest of their lives. She completed 42 paintings within the first three years of living in Norham. She died there on 9 December 1918.

In 1873 Dickinson became an honorary member of the Berwickshire Naturalists Club, and contributed her paintings to exhibitions and attended meetings until 1908. She went on the society's field visit to Lindisfarne in 1874, painting several plants that she found there.

== Legacy ==
Four hundred and fifty eight of her wildflower painting are held by the Natural History Society of Northumbria at the Great North Museum: Hancock in collaboration with the University of Newcastle, along with her field notes and an annotated copy of The British Flora by William Hooker. She bequeathed these to the museum in 1918, along with her collection of seaweeds, dried plants and paintings of fungi. The Royal Horticultural Society holds her Album of Narcissus that has 30 paintings of daffodil cultivars and species that she made between May 1886 and April 1893. This was bought at an auction in 1996.

Poet Linda France was inspired in 2018 to write the poem Portrait of the Artist as an Island Flower by the paintings Dickinson made after visiting Lindisfarne.

Elizabeth Towner wrote a biography of Dickinson in 2021 where she stated that there was no known photo of Dickinson. Claire Jones and the Natural History Society of Northumbria, curated an exhibition of Dr. Kathleen Blackburn, Mary Jane Hancock, ornithologist Catharine Hodgkin, Dr. Marie V. Lebour, bryologist Evelyn M. Lobley, Grace Hickling and Dickinson, in 2018. The Women Naturalists of North East England exhibition included a cover photo which was misidentified as Dickinson. The photo (on page three) was of Mary Jane Hancock.

From October 2022 until February 2023, there was an exhibition of her work in the Granary Gallery at the Maltings, Berwick-upon-Tweed.
