= Norah Balls =

British suffragette (1886–1980)

- Born: 3 August 1886; North Shields, England
- Died: 26 May 1980 (aged 93)
- Known for: Suffragette and community worker

Norah Elizabeth Balls (3 August 1886 – 26 May 1980) was a British suffragette, women's rights campaigner, magistrate and councillor. She was a co-founder of the Girl Guides movement in Northumberland.

== Early life ==
Norah Elizabeth Balls was born to Elizabeth Balls (née Rutherford) and William Balls on 3 August 1886 in a house called Deneside on Linskill Street, North Shields, Northumberland, 8 miles (13 km) north-east of Newcastle upon Tyne. Her father was a mariner, her mother's family were farmers and she had one younger brother. Balls attended the Misses Herberts' private school.

== Suffrage activity ==
When Balls was in her very early teens her mother took her to a women's suffrage meeting addressed by Dr Elizabeth Garrett Anderson. She was never sure why as her mother was not particularly pro suffrage, although of a strong character. Some years later, Balls became an active member of the Women's Social and Political Union (WSPU), having had her interest piqued whilst out walking her dog and seeing women waiting for waggon to a meeting in Tynemouth. She worked with the WSPU, arranging meetings in the North East of England. She collaborated with the Pankhursts when they visited the area. Her parents were supportive, particularly her father and one of the Pankhursts stayed with the family. Her mother became very fond of Flora Drummond. Balls first took the chair of a meeting on the instruction of Mrs Pankhurst at a meeting about a bye election, who later told her she "did very well". As part of her work to gain female suffrage, Balls toured the North East of England addressing meetings. She was often confronted by angry crowds, but exhibited considerable sang froid when quarrymen threw rocks at her, picking up the stones to take home and add to her rockery. Balls was a friend of Emily Wilding Davison's family, going to the family home for afternoon tea. She also got to know the Newcastle doctor and suffragist Ethel Williams. She was arrested three times during her campaigning work, and admitted later in life to undertaking an arson attack in May 1913 on Brandling House in Gosforth Park.

In 1909, when Winston Churchill, at the time Home Secretary, visited Newcastle, she challenged him over his opposition to giving women the vote and disrupted his speech at the city's Assembly Rooms. In 1910, she appeared on a colourised WSPU postcard publicising the organisation's summer uniform. On 19 November 1910, she was part of a group of 300 suffragettes who gathered in Caxton Hall in London and tried to force their way into the House of Commons to deliver a petition to the Prime Minister. The event came to be known as Black Friday. She was arrested (one of 115 women and four men) and brought up in court at Bow Street Police Court the following day, having slept on the floor of a cell with her head in a coal bucket. She was bailed out by Frederick Pethick-Lawrence. All charges were dropped for those arrested as Winston Churchill felt "on this occasion no public advantage would be gained by proceeding with the prosecution" and he did not want the women to be made martyrs for their cause.

== Community work ==
With the start of the First World War, Balls followed the WSPU's policy of pausing the campaign for female suffrage and stepped up to support the war effort. Instead, Balls set up a soldiers’ canteen in Whitley Bay.

Through her work with the WSPU, she got to know Lady Katharine Parsons, a founder of the Women's Engineering Society and wife of steam turbine inventor Charles Parsons, who lived at Kirkwhelpington, Northumberland. She went to stay with them quite often. In 1916, Parsons invited Balls to help set up the Girl Guides in Northumberland. Balls went on to be the Guides’ first Northumberland county secretary in Northumberland, then in 1936 she was made County Commissioner and later President. In 1932 the Girl Guides presented her with the Oakleaf award for her outstanding contribution to the organisation.

In 1920, Balls stood for election in the Percy ward but was unsuccessful. She believed there would be less waste and extravagance if more women stood for election.

In 1928 Balls was the Chairman of the North East Coast Branch of the Electrical Association for Women (EAW) and stayed involved for 50 years. In 1933 she sat on the National Cinema Enquiry Committee.

Balls was recorded as the Organising Secretary for Social Services in the 1939 Register. During the Second World War, she served as an air raid warden in Tynemouth at night, and worked for the Ministry of Information during the day. Her house was badly damaged when a bomb dropped in her garden.

In later life she became a magistrate, a Tynemouth town councillor. She was a founder member of Tynemouth Business and Professional Women's Club. When made a Justice of the Peace in 1944, she enquired if any of the other magistrates had been on both sides of the dock. She stood for election again in 1946, as an independent candidate in the Dockray ward of Tynemouth, a slum area, and this time was not only successful but unseated a former mayor.

== Later life ==
When Balls retired as a councillor in 1951, she sat on 28 committees across the community. These included chairing of the Tynemouth Unemployed Welfare Committee and the Tyneside Union of Girls’ Clubs. In 1954, she was elected Chairman of the EAW's National Executive Committee. On 25 January 1957, Balls read the lesson at the memorial service for Dame Caroline Haslett at St Martins in the Field, having worked closely with her for over 20 years in the EAW.

Balls was invited by the third Lady Armstrong to move into a flat in Bamburgh Castle, then later moved to a cottage in the nearby village. When she moved, Balls left behind a tapestry that had been given to her by Noël Coward as it would not fit in her new home.

In 1962, Balls was interviewed as part of the film The Coast of Kings by Tyne Tees Television for their Your Heritage series. In 1975, she made an oral history recording about her suffragette experiences for Northumberland Archives. Extracts from this recording can be heard in the podcast "Northumberland Voices: A Dangerous Woman" (2021) by Northumberland Archives.

Balls travelled widely, during her working life and retirement.

Norah Balls died on 26 May 1980, aged 94.

== Commemoration ==
A blue plaque was unveiled in her honour at 36 King Edward Road, Tynemouth, her home from 1902 to 1936 on 8 March 2022, with members of her family in attendance. The house was originally built for Norah Balls's family and named Deneside.

The Museum of London hold five postcards previously owned by Norah Balls, showing key suffragette moments, including one of Balls herself modelling The Suffragette Look, "the white frock with regalia and colours" of a sash in purple, green and white proclaiming "Votes for Women", introduced by the WSPU in June 1908. The other postcards feature Mrs. Pankhurst at Trafalgar Square inviting the audience to "Rush" the House of Commons on October 13, 1908, Emmeline Pankhurst, Christabel Pankhurst and the Arrest of Mrs. Pankhurst, Miss Pankhurst, and Mrs Drummond. Mr Jarvis Reading the Warrant at Clement's Inn, October 13, 1908.
