= Hickling (surname) =

Hickling is a surname. Notable people with the surname include:

- Archie Hickling, the English electrochemist who built the first three electrodes potentiostat in 1942
- Billy Hickling, an English footballer
- Frank Hickling (born 1941), an Australian army officer
- Garett Hickling (1970–2025), a Canadian wheelchair rugby player
- Grace Hickling MBE (née Watt, 1908–1986), a British naturalist and ornithologist
- Henry George Albert Hickling FRS (1883–1954), a British geologist and palaeontologist
- Hugh Hickling (1920–2007), a British lawyer, colonial civil servant, law academic and author
- Ronald Hickling (1912–2006), a British ornithologist
- Thomas Hickling (born 1940), an English cricketer
