= Marie Lebour =

British marine biologist

- Born: 20 August 1876; Woodburn, Northumberland
- Died: 2 October 1971 (aged 95)
- Awards: Fellow of the Zoological Society

Academic background
- Education: Durham University

Academic work
- Institutions: University of Leeds, Marine Biological Laboratory of Plymouth
- Main interests: Marine biology

Marie Victoire Lebour (20 August 1876 – 2 October 1971) was a British marine biologist known for her study of the life cycles of various marine animals. She published more than 175 works during her long career.

== Early life and education ==
Marie Lebour was born the youngest of three daughters to Emily and George Lebour in Woodburn, Northumberland on 20 August 1876. Her father was a professor of geology and Marie regularly joined him on expeditions, collecting specimens for her own collections. She attended Armstrong College and studied art, then went on to Durham University, where she earned degrees in zoology: an associate degree in 1903, bachelor's degree in 1904, master's degree in 1907, and doctorate in 1917.

== Career and research ==
In 1900, before beginning her scientific education, Lebour began her research career with a paper on land and freshwater molluscs in Northumberland. While studying for her master's degree, Lebour was on staff at Durham University. From 1906 to 1909, she was a demonstrator in the Department of Zoology at the University of Leeds and from 1909 to 1915 she was also an assistant lecturer. Lebour's professional research career was entirely conducted at the Marine Biological Association's Laboratory at Plymouth, where she joined the research staff in 1915. She was a full staff member there until 1946, then an honorary staff member until she could no longer conduct research due to health problems, in 1964.

Her main research interests were the larval stages of both trematodes (some species of which are parasites of molluscs) and of molluscs themselves. She published more than 100 papers on these topics during her career. She also worked on microplankton and discovered at least 28 new species which she catalogued in two books. After publishing these books, Lebour used the newly invented plunger jar to better study the egg and larval stages of krill in the North Atlantic, Antarctica, and Bermuda. She also published well-regarded work on the eggs and larvae of sprat, herring, and pilchards. She also conducted research in West Africa.

In addition to her research, Lebour was also an active member of the scientific community. She was amongst the first cohort of scientists who joined the Society for Experimental Biology in 1923 to collaborate and exchange ideas helping to further establish her reputation as a leading figure in the field of marine biology.

Lebour retired in 1945 at the age of 70, but continued to work into the laboratory and publish until she was 88 and her failing vision prevented her from working at the microscope.

== Honours, death and legacy ==
Lebour was a member of several professional societies. She was a fellow of the Linnaean Society, a lifetime fellow of the Zoological Society, and a member of the Marine Biological Association of the United Kingdom. Multiple species of dinoflagellates were named after her, including genera Lebouraia and Lebouridinium and the species Polykrikos lebourae and Cochlodinium lebourae. She was remembered fondly by her colleagues.

Lebour died on 2 October 1971, at the age of 95. Many of Lebour's publications are still used by researchers. Lebour appeared in the Natural History Society of Northumbria's Women Naturalists exhibition which celebrated the achievements of pioneering women naturalists. The featured scientists were Lebour, Mary Jane Hancock, Dr. Kathleen Blackburn, ornithologist Catharine Hodgkin, bryologist Evelyn Lobley, Grace Hickling and botanical artist Margaret Rebecca Dickinson.

== Selected publications ==
- Lebour, Marie V. (1922). "The Food of Plankton Organisms". Journal of the Marine Biological Association of the United Kingdom. 12 (4): 644–677. doi:10.1017/S0025315400009681. ISSN 0025-3154. S2CID 53656496.
- Lebour, Marie V. (1923). "The Food of Plankton Organisms. II". Journal of the Marine Biological Association of the United Kingdom. 13 (1): 70–92. doi:10.1017/S0025315400010936. ISSN 0025-3154. S2CID 53662561.
- Lebour, Marie V. (1937). "The Eggs and Larvae of the British Prosobranchs with Special Reference to those Living in the Plankton". Journal of the Marine Biological Association of the United Kingdom. 22 (1): 105–166. doi:10.1017/S0025315400011917. ISSN 0025-3154. S2CID 84964447.
- Lebour, Marie Victoria (1965). The dinoflagellates of northern seas. Plymouth [England: Marine biological Association of the United Kingdom. OCLC 10581076.
