= Mary Jane Hancock =

English artist and botanist

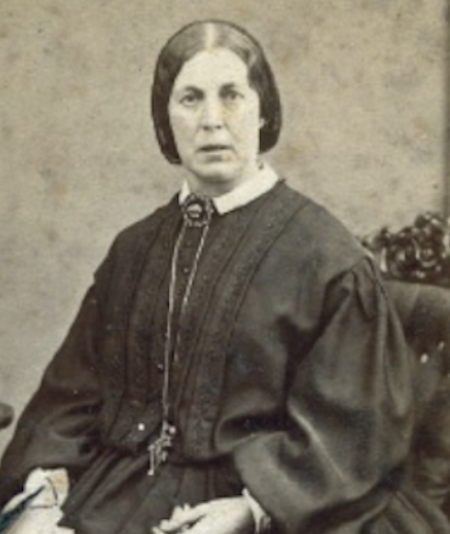
- Born: 1810
- Died: 1896 (aged 85–86)
- Occupations: housekeeper, painter, naturalist

Mary Jane Hancock (1810 – 1896) was an English artist and naturalist and an elected member of the Natural History Society of Northumbria.

== Early life ==
Hancock was born in Newcastle upon Tyne in 1810 to John Hancock Sr, a saddle maker. Her brothers were Thomas, John and Albany known for the Hancock Museum. Mary's father was a saddle maker, sparking her interest in, and love for nature. Mary would go on expeditions through Northumberland and County Durham, creating art based on nature.

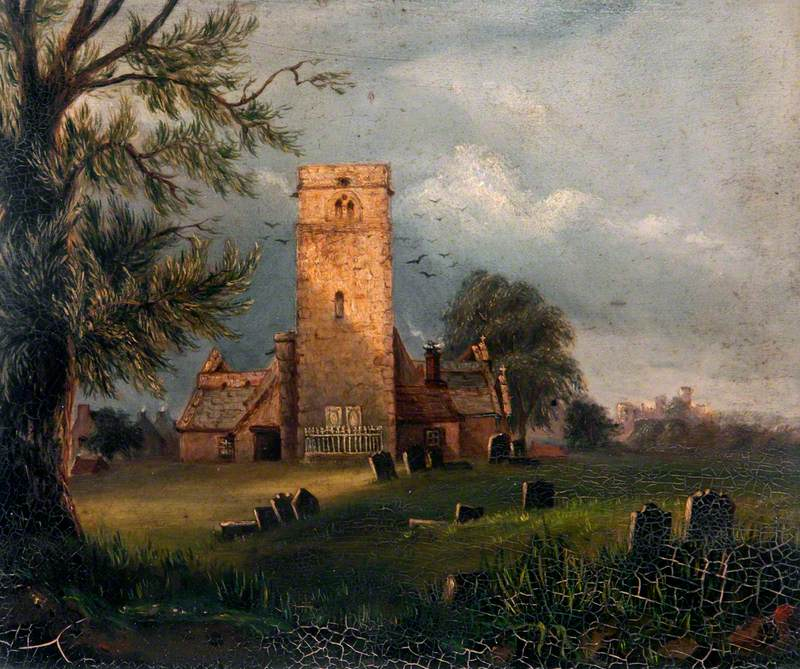
Her 1843 painting of Thomas Bewick’s Grave in Ovingham Churchyard in Northumberland

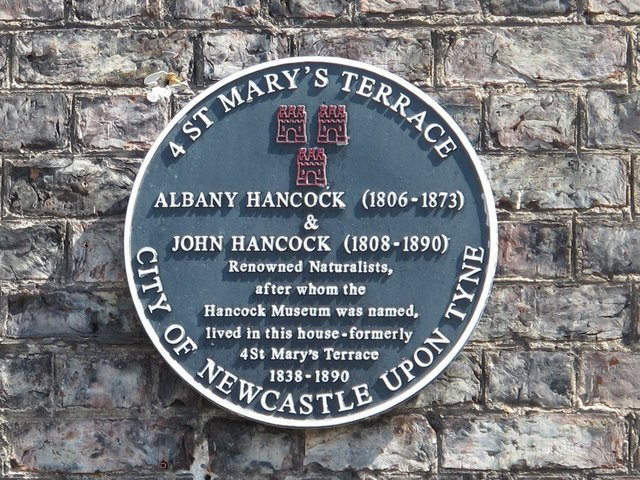
A plaque outside of the Hancocks’ Residence in Newcastle Upon Tyne

== Career ==
In 1884 at the age of 74, Mary became an elected member of the Natural History Society of Northumbria.

=== Art works ===
Throughout her life, Mary documented scenes of both nature and the city through artworks. Her works utilized different media on paper, including ink in her paintings of The Old Tyne Bridge, Moot Hall, St Nicholas Cathedral and Castle, and watercolour in her sketch of Albany Hancock and Miss Jane Bewick walking towards a cottage door in Cumbria, as well as Tynemouth Watercolor. The Natural History Society of Northumbria holds over 60 of her paintings.

== Contribution and legacy ==
Hancock was an early contributor to the North East's natural history collections through her work as a naturalist. She appeared in the Natural History Society of Northumbria Women Naturalists exhibition which celebrated the achievements of pioneering women naturalists. The featured scientists were Hancock, Dr. Kathleen Blackburn, ornithologist Catharine Hodgkin, Dr. Marie V. Lebour, bryologist Evelyn Lobley, Grace Hickling and botanical artist Margaret Rebecca Dickinson.
