= Hickling =

Hickling may refer to:

== Places ==
Norfolk, England

- Hickling, Norfolk, village and parish
- Hickling Broad
- Hickling Green
- Hickling Heath

Nottinghamshire, England

- Hickling, Nottinghamshire

== Other uses ==
- Hickling (surname)
