= Grace Hickling =

English ornithologist (1908–1986)

crop of photo by Joe Payne

Grace Hickling MBE (10 August 1908 – 30 December 1986) was an English ornithologist and naturalist known for studying wildlife on the Farne Islands, in the North Sea off the Northumberland coast.

== Early life and education ==
Hickling was the only daughter of Adam and Grace Anne Watt, her father being an engineer in Newcastle upon Tyne. She attended Harrogate Ladies' College, and after a period at Armstrong College in Newcastle, studied mathematics and geography at Newnham College, Cambridge from 1928 to 1931.

== Career ==
Hickling embarked on a teaching career, but was called up to work as an intelligence officer on 1 September 1939, a few days prior to Britain's entry into World War II. Based at the regional war room in Newcastle upon Tyne, she was originally offered the standard salary of £400, until it was discovered that she was a woman and her pay was cut by £100. While working as an intelligence officer, she met Russell Goddard, the curator of the Hancock Museum, who first interested her in the Farne Islands. For the next 38 years she worked as the honorary secretary of the Natural History Society of Northumbria. When Goddard died in 1948, Hickling began transcribing his notes on Farne Island birds, adding in her own notes. She produced twenty-two volumes which have been photocopied for future study. She also spent every spring leading bird tagging in the Farne Islands, where she tagged 187,600 birds. Hickling was also an authority on grey seals, and with John Coulson of Durham University, published several scientific papers on their breeding and life-cycles. In the early 1960s, she was heavily involved in discussions around the trial culling of grey seals on the Farne Islands and along the coast of Northumberland.

== Family ==
In 1954, Watt married George Hickling, a retired professor from Newcastle University who died just two weeks later.

== Achievements and awards ==
Hickling published two books, The Farne Islands: Their History and Wildlife and Grey Seals and the Farne Islands in 1951 and 1962. She served as the naturalists' representative for the Lindisfarne National Nature Reserve at its beginning in 1964, and was on the local committee of the National Trust for the Farne Islands from 1949. In June 1974 she was recognized for her work with the Northumberland Natural History Society by being made a Member of the Order of the British Empire. Following her death in 1986, her ashes were scattered in St. Cuthbert's Cove, Inner Farne.

Claire Jones and the Natural History Society of Northumbria curated a Women Naturalists of North East England exhibition in 2018. The featured scientists were Hickling, Dr. Kathleen Blackburn, Mary Jane Hancock, ornothologist Catharine Hodgkin, Dr. Marie V. Lebour, bryologist Evelyn Lobley and botanical artist Margaret Rebecca Dickinson.
