= David Gardner-Medwin =

British neurologist who worked in Newcastle upon Tyne

David Gardner-Medwin FRCP FRCPCH
- David Gardner-Medwin in 1997
- Born: 13 November 1936; London, UK
- Died: 14 June 2014 (aged 77)
- Education: King's College, Cambridge; St Bartholomew's Hospital
- Occupation: Neurologist for children
- Medical career
- Profession: Physician
- Research: Duchenne Muscular Dystrophy

David Gardner-Medwin (13 November 1936 – 14 June 2014) was a British physician who worked as a paediatric neurologist in Newcastle upon Tyne, serving as the only neurologist for children for a population of 3.5 million. He is credited with introducing multidisciplinary care to the management of boys with Duchenne muscular dystrophy (DMD). When he retired at the age of 60, four consultants were appointed to replace him.

In the 1960s, working as a research fellow with neurologist John Walton, he studied the genetics and clinical features of the diseases of muscles, particularly relating to the identification of female carriers of DMD.

Parallel to his career in medicine was his interest in natural history and involvement with the Natural History Society of Northumbria, the binding and restoration of books and studies on Thomas Bewick. He finished a study of Bewick's family history and contributed to the Bewick Birthplace Trust's campaign to preserve Bewick's birthplace of Cherryburn in Northumberland.

== Early life and education ==
David Gardner-Medwin was born on 13 November 1936 at The London Clinic in Marylebone, to Robert Gardner-Medwin, a British architect, and Margaret Gardner-Medwin née Kilgour, a Canadian. The eldest of four sons, he spent his childhood first in London, followed by evacuation to Canada during the Second World War. Before the end of the war his family moved to Barbados where his father took up a job in development and planning, and later they transferred to Edinburgh, where he was educated at the Edinburgh Academy, and where he became interested in ornithology.

He gained admission to study natural sciences at King's College, University of Cambridge, but shortly after starting, switched to medicine. There, he produced his first publication on the migration of birds across the Pyrenees. After being gifted the first edition of a A History of British Birds by his grandmother on his twentieth birthday, he became interested in the naturalist and wood engraver Thomas Bewick. He completed his clinical training at St Bartholomew's Hospital, and graduated in 1962.

== Career ==
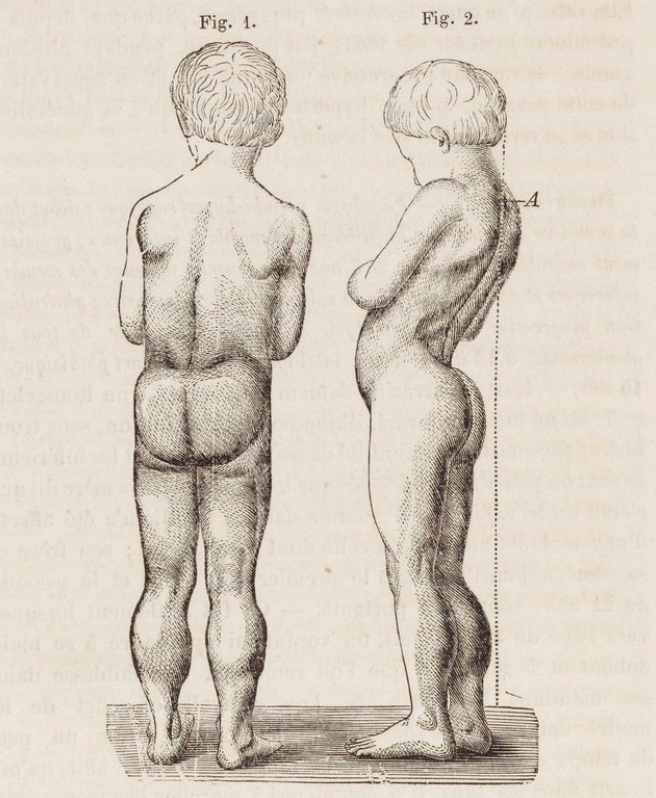
Drawing of boy with Duchenne muscular dystrophy

X-linked recessive

Gardner-Medwin completed his junior posts at Exeter and Farnborough, before taking up a job in pathology at St Bartholomew's. Subsequently, he worked under neurologist John Aldren Turner before moving to Newcastle to take up the post of Medical Research Council research fellow to John Walton, later Lord Walton of Detchant, with whom he studied the genetics and clinical features of muscular dystrophies, particularly relating to the identification of female carriers of the X-linked recessive gene responsible for the most severe form of the disease, Duchenne muscular dystrophy (DMD). By measuring the muscle enzyme creatine kinase in blood samples, and taking into account various indicators such as other genetic markers and family history, he worked out the likelihood that a woman might be carrying the gene for DMD. It became the subject of a thesis for which he gained an MD in 1972.

After spending some time in adult neurology, paediatrics and child psychiatry, he was awarded a neurology fellowship in Boston, working with Raymond Adams at the Massachusetts General Hospital and Charles Barlow at Boston Children's Hospital. In 1971 he returned to Newcastle and the following year was appointed the first consultant paediatric neurologist to the northern region, where for many years, he served as the only neurologist for children for a population of 3.5 million.

To his colleagues he became known as DGM and is credited with introducing multidisciplinary care and nocturnal ventilation to the management of boys with DMD. During his career at Newcastle, the chances of survival for children with DMD improved from 0% to reaching age 25 years in the 1960s to 12% in the 1980s, and 53% after 1990. Despite the initial classification of limb–girdle muscular dystrophy by Walton in the 1950s, both Walton and Gardner-Medwin challenged the term by 1994, describing that some of the features in this group of muscle disorders disguised other conditions, and they "recognize[d] that research in this long neglected group of muscular dystrophies is still in an early and transitional stage". When he retired at the age of 60, four consultants were appointed to replace him.

== Later life ==
In 1997 he attended the public enquiry on the expansion of military use of the Otterburn Moors in the Cheviot Hills, and his comments led to mitigation of the impact of the army's manoeuvres upon wildlife in Northumberland.

He co-founded the British Paediatric Neurology Association and later became its secretary and treasurer. He then became secretary of the Mac Keith Press, which publishes work on neurological conditions of children.

== Natural history ==
Parallel to his career in medicine was his interest in natural history and in the binding and restoration of books. In 1966 he became involved with the Natural History Society of Northumbria, for which he was once chairman of its library committee and later chairman of its council. He also became president of the Friends of the Newcastle University Library. He finished a study of Bewick's family history and contributed to the Bewick Birthplace Trust's campaign to preserve Cherryburn and promote Bewick's works, and he later became vice president of the Thomas Bewick Society.

== Personal and family ==
He met Alisoun Shire when he was at Cambridge and they married in the chapel of King's College. They had two children, including Janet who became a paediatrician.

Gardner-Medwin died from leukaemia on 14 June 2014, at the age of 77.

== Selected publications ==
- Gardner-Medwin, David (1968). "Studies of the carrier state in the Duchenne type of muscular dystrophy" (PDF). Journal of Neurology, Neurosurgery, and Psychiatry. 31 (1): 124–134. doi:10.1016/0022-510X(84)90058-3. ISSN 0022-510X. PMID 6737006. S2CID 6205380.
- Gardner-Medwin, David; Walton, JohnN (18 January 1969). "Myokymia with impaired muscular relaxation". The Lancet. 293 (7586): 127–130. doi:10.1016/S0140-6736(69)91138-6. ISSN 0140-6736. PMID 4178245.
- Gardner-Medwin, David (May 1980). "Clinical features and classification of the muscular dystrophies". British Medical Bulletin, Volume 36, Issue 2, May 1980, Pages 109–116, doi:10.1093/oxfordjournals.bmb.a071623
- Gardner-Medwin, David; Johnston, Heather M. (1 April 1984). "Severe muscular dystrophy in girls". Journal of the Neurological Sciences. 64 (1): 79–87. doi:10.1016/0022-510X(84)90058-3. ISSN 0022-510X. PMID 6737006. S2CID 6205380.
