= Gosforth Nature Reserve =

Nature reserve in Tyne and Wear, UK

- IUCN category IV (habitat/species management area)
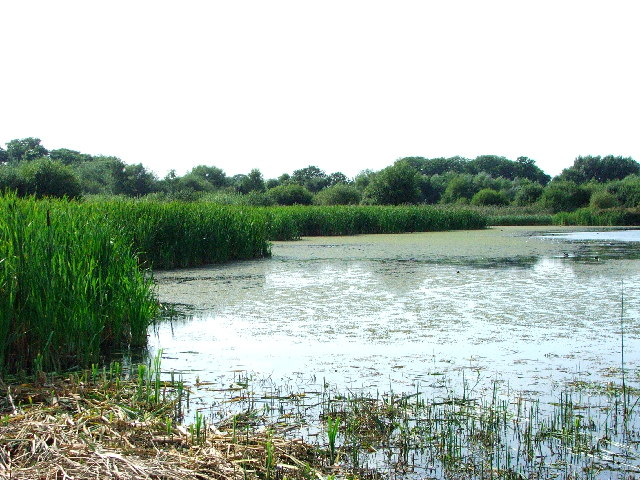
- The lake on the reserve

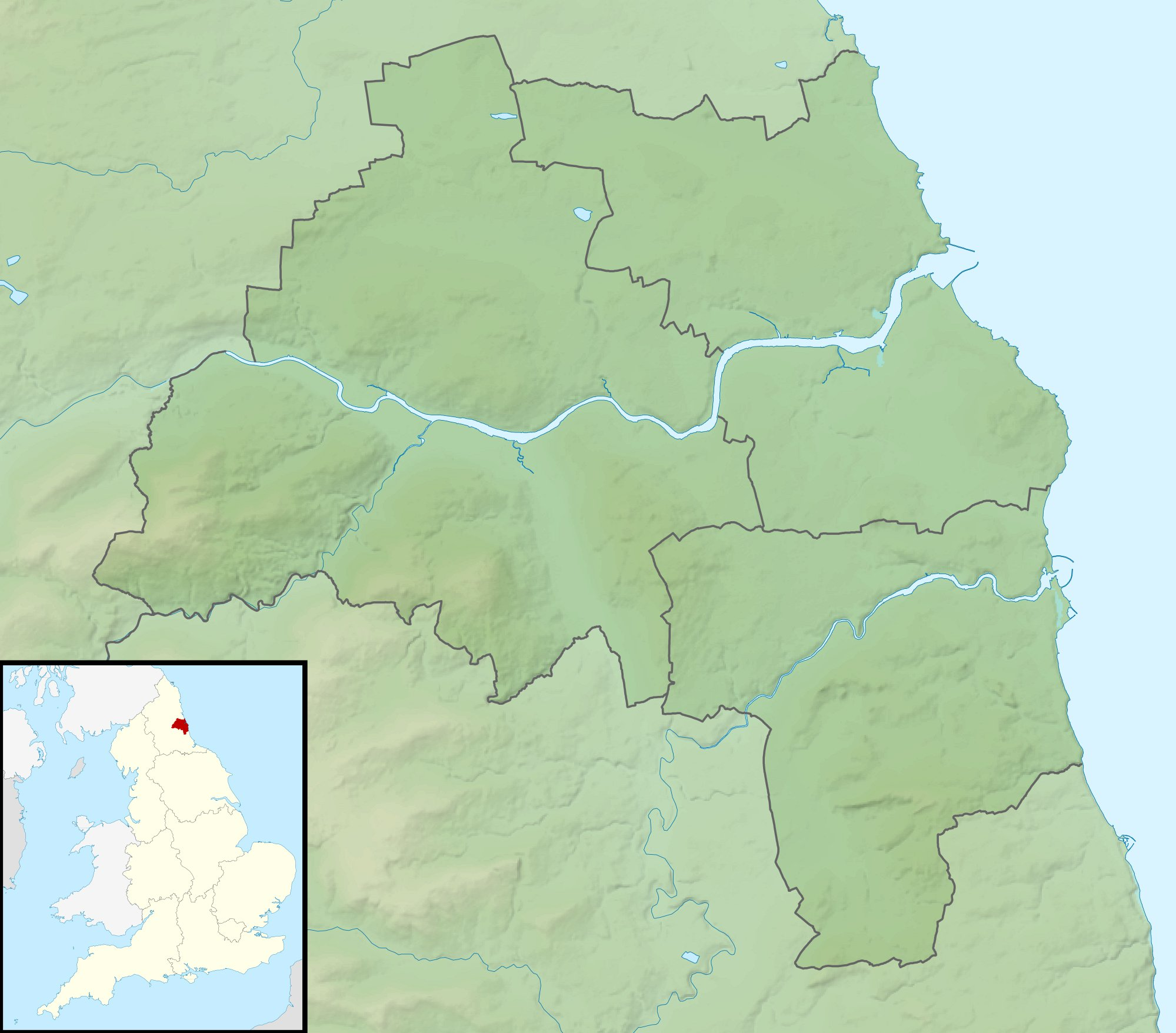
- Location within Tyne and Wear
- Nearest city: Newcastle upon Tyne
- Coordinates: 55.0304°N 1.6031°W
- Area: 65 ha (160 acres)
- Operator: Natural History Society of Northumbria
- Owner: Newcastle Racecourse

Gosforth Nature Reserve is a wildlife haven in Tyne and Wear, England. It includes extensive woodland and wetland habitats and is managed by the Natural History Society of Northumbria. Access to the reserve is restricted to NHSN members and those in possession of a valid day pass. Dog walking and other recreational activities are not permitted on site. The reserve is part of Gosforth Park, the old estate of Gosforth House.

== History ==
In medieval times, what is now Gosforth Nature Reserve would have been agricultural land, there is some remaining evidence of ridge and furrow. The general habitat in the area would have been heathland, hence the name of the nearby village of West Moor and the nearby track called Heathery Lane. When the Brandling family took over the land and built their large estate house they had the surrounding area landscaped, as was the fashion of the day. This included planting new woodland and creating a new lake for boating and fishing. From historic maps it appears that the lake was created in the period 1810–1820 and that most of the woodland was planted around the mid-19th century.

The Brandling family fell on hard times and sold off the estate towards the end of the 19th century and from that period onwards nature began to take over. In 1924 in order to prevent hunting and shooting of the wildlife Mr W. E. Beck leased the shooting rights for the lake and surrounding woodland. He was a member of the Natural History Society of Northumbria and in 1929, in declining health, he passed his rights to the trustees of the Society. Since that time the Society has managed this area for the benefit of wildlife.

== Habitats and wildlife ==
Gosforth Nature Reserve contains an important wetland, which is dominated by Phragmites reeds and open water and surrounded by wet carr woodland. These wetland habitats support breeding bird species such as reed warbler, water rail, reed bunting, sedge warbler, common tern and little grebe and in the winter birds such as bittern, kingfisher, wigeon, teal and shoveler. Aquatic mammals such as otter. water vole and water shrew are also present. England's second largest colony of coralroot orchid is also found here.

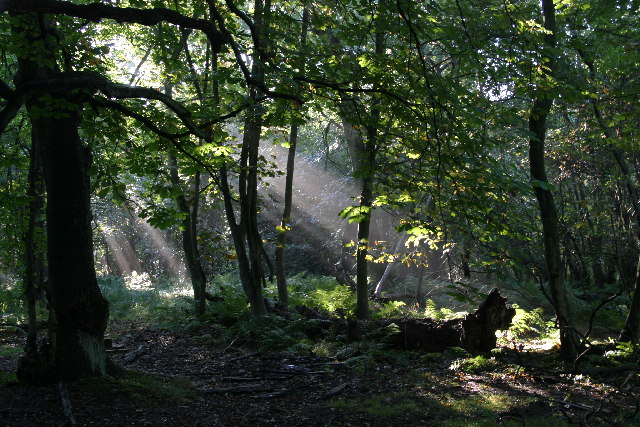
Woodland in the reserve

The majority of the reserve is semi-natural woodland, dominated by oak and birch, however, there are also some plantations of conifers. Woodland mammals such as badger, fox, roe deer and stoat can be found and red squirrel are also still present. Most importantly the woodland supports a wide range of insects, including many uncommon species.

There is also a small area of meadow, which contains plants such as heather and northern marsh orchid.

== Site of Special Scientific Interest ==
Gosforth Park Nature Reserve was designated as a Site of Special Scientific Interest (SSSI) in 1977. The citation includes:

The locality is regionally important for its aquatic, grassland and woodland invertebrate faunas which include two nationally rare species, a small beetle Triplax scutellaris and Adrena alfkenella, a solitary bee.

== Ownership and public access ==
The nature reserve is still part of Newcastle Racecourse, which as of 2015 is owned by Arena Racing Company. It lies to the north-east of the Whitebridge Park housing estate. It is leased to the Natural History Society of Northumbria.

In order to minimize disturbance to sensitive wildlife, there is no public access to the nature reserve, and there are no public rights of way. The reserve is open to members of the Natural History Society of Northumbria; non-members can buy a visitor pass upon arrival. NHSN holds regular public open days on-site and hosts a range of activities for school groups and local people.
