= Bill Allen (architect) =

Architect and building scientist

William Alexander Allen, known as Bill Allen, (1914–1998) was an architect who specialised in acoustics, lighting and building defects. Born in Winnipeg, he studied architecture at the University of Manitoba's School of Architecture graduating in 1936 with the university's gold medal. He moved to England where eventually he became the Chief Architect at the Building Research Station, and subsequently head of the Architectural Association. He founded a leading edge consultancy specialising in lighting, acoustics and the diagnosis of building defects.

Allen had a major impact on the education of architects in Britain, specifically as one of the main driving forces behind a more academic and scientific basis for university courses brought about by the 1958 Oxford Conference on architectural education, and which forms the basis of the current educational system for the profession of architecture.

== Early career ==
William Alexander Allen was born in Winnipeg on 29 June 1914 to a distinguished family of academics. His father, Frank Allen, was the professor of physics at the University of Manitoba, and introduced him to acoustics. His brother John Frank Allen became a professor of physics at St Andrews University, and his sister Lillian B. Allen was an associate professor and nature photographer.

Allen studied architecture at the University of Manitoba's School of Architecture (1932–1936) graduating with the university's gold medal. That same year, he moved to England and worked for the architectural practice founded by Louis de Soissons in Welwyn Garden City, where he set up home. After a stint in architectural practice, he joined the Building Research Station (now the Building Research Establishment), near Watford, as a building researcher. In the post-war period he became deputy head of physics and led a BRS team advising on the acoustics of the Royal Festival Hall.

A prolific writer, he published widely in the professional and technical press, and contributed to the Penguin book Science at War (1940) He wrote three Post-War Building Studies commissioned by the Ministry of Works. These covered his main research interests which were the effect of heat, light and sound on the human sensory system ; his three building studies dealt with heating and ventilation, lighting, and sound insulation and acoustics, and they defined comfort standards for a range of environmental factors.

== Research and teaching ==
In 1954, he was appointed Chief Architect at the Building Research Station. According to Zamarian, Allen considered science to be the defining value system of the age and this imposed a responsibility on architects to develop a scientific outlook to ensure buildings would best serve the society that commissioned them. Other architects who shared the view that architecture should have higher academic standards and a curriculum enriched by scientific content included Robert Gardner-Medwin who was appointed at Liverpool School of Architecture, Robert Matthew who joined the University of Edinburgh, and Leslie Martin the first professor of architecture at Cambridge. All of this group, together with Richard Llewelyn Davies (who went on to be professor of architecture at the Bartlett School in 1960) worked closely to bring about these changes to the educational policy of the RIBA, and they were all involved in the historic 1958 Oxford Conference at which it was agreed to raise entry standards to the profession, and to support post-graduate research in architecture.

Nevertheless, there were differences of opinion even among the group. For Leslie Martin, who chaired the conference, architectural research was primarily an intellectual exercise to advance theory and justify architecture as an academic discipline. In contrast, Allen saw building science and research as an intrinsic part of practice in a profession that needed to be imbued with a scientific outlook. Zamarian argues that Allen, rather than Martin and Llewelyn Davies (each of whom wrote up a contrasting account of the conference outcome) was the most significant figure behind the reforms agreed at the Oxford Conference.

At Liverpool, Gardner-Medwin had sought to establish a Department of Building Science within the school of Architecture and tried to recruit Allen to head it. Allen declined, and the department eventually became part of the Faculty of Engineering. Later, however, Allen did take up an academic post. In 1961, he was appointed head of the Architectural Association. Here he encouraged the teaching of construction principles, and brought in building scientists from the Building Research Station to lecture and participate in crits. This was in addition to his genuine passion for architectural history and theory, and the bringing in of appropriate specialist historians and others.

For Allen, architecture and analytical science were inextricably bound together, and he encouraged the specialist lecturers to teach their subject from an architectural viewpoint and to inject their expertise directly into the studio environment, enriching architectural design. However, many design teachers were opposed to such interference. In their visit to the AA in 1963, the visiting board of the Board of Architectural Education welcomed the thinking that had inspired the recent changes but were unimpressed by the outcomes. Allen became disillusioned and left in December 1965, forced out by the governing body. In Zamarian's view, the Architectural Association was the most unsuitable of institutions to introduce these reforms. Nevertheless, his advocacy of some scientific content culminated in an educational system that in essence survives to the present day.

== The return to architectural practice ==
In 1962 he had set up a consultancy in partnership with John Bickerdike, their respective skills complementing one another. Bickerdike was the architect designer, while Allen's strengths lay in science and technology. Leaving the AA, he focused on the partnership. The practice gained a wide range of commissions, including a reputation for diagnosing building defects and proposing means of rectification. The practice also offered acoustics and lighting consultancy services. As his hearing diminished with age, Allen expanded his expertise into specialised display lighting, and he was responsible for lighting at a number of major international galleries and museums, such as the Frick Collection in New York and the Gulbenkian Museum in Lisbon.

== Awards and honours ==
Allen chaired or served on numerous committees. He was vice-president of the RIBA, and a joint founder of the Institute of Acoustics. For his work on the Gulbenkian Museum in Lisbon he was awarded the Commander of the Order of Merit (Portugal). He received honorary fellowships from the American Institute of Architects and from the New Zealand Institute of Architects.

He was appointed Commander of the British Empire in 1980.

== Personal life ==
Allen married Tessa Pearson and they had two sons. The family lived in a house he designed in Welwyn Garden City and which was a test bed for underfloor heating. He died at Welwyn Garden City on 14 December 1998. He was working on the Gulbenkian up until a week before his death.

A year before he died, he published The Building Envelope (1997). A combination of technical handbook and autobiography, it was dedicated to his mentor, R. Fitzmaurice of the BRE, the main author of the 1939 edition of BRE's seminal Principles of Modern Building. Fitzmaurice had fuelled his enthusiasm for a marriage between architecture and science, and the book is a record of this union.
