= Robert Gardner-Medwin =

British architect and academic (1907–1995)

Robert Gardner-Medwin (1907–1995) was the fourth Roscoe Professor of Architecture at Liverpool University and held the chair for 21 years from 1952 to 1973. His predecessors were F. M. Simpson (1894 to 1904), Charles Reilly (1904 to 1933) and Lionel Budden (1933 to 1952). He was influential in issues as diverse as town planning in the West Indies, the development of modern tropical architecture, architecture becoming an all-graduate profession, the widening of postgraduate research in schools of architecture, as well as for the design of major architectural projects at the university campuses of both Edinburgh and Liverpool.

== Early career ==
Robert Gardner-Medwin was born in North Wales on 10 March 1907. He was educated at Rossall School, and studied architecture at Liverpool University in the 1920s. In the summer vacation of 1929 he travelled to the United States and worked in the New York office of Sloan & Robertson, and also explored Chicago. He returned via Quebec, sailing home on the RMS Ascania where he met his future wife Margaret Kilgour, a Canadian.

He graduated in Architecture with First Class honours from Liverpool in 1931, and was also a Prix de Rome finalist that same year. He went on to hold a Commonwealth Fund Fellowship in City and Regional Planning at Harvard and travelled extensively in the United States. He took his Diploma in Civic Design at Liverpool in 1935.

He went into private practice and was employed by Maxwell Fry, and also taught briefly at the Architectural Association and the Regent Street Polytechnic.

He was called up for military service in 1940, and served with the Royal Engineers at Southern Command Headquarters constructing American base camps and hospital units.

In 1944 he was appointed Town Planning and Housing Advisor to the Comptroller for Development and Welfare in the British West Indies. He was involved in 'development and welfare' studies into building materials and housing in the West Indies, and the planning of a new centre for Georgetown, British Guiana, which had been destroyed by fire in 1945.

Gardner-Medwin's work in the West Indies is regarded as having been highly influential in the development of modern tropical architecture; he contributed to UN housing missions to South East Asia and spoke at the Tropical Architecture Conference at University College London in 1953.

In 1947 Gardner-Medwin became Chief Architect and Planning Officer to the Department of Health for Scotland, heading a team of 35 architects and being responsible for a wide range of advice on housing and hospitals, as well as the siting and planning of new towns.

== Roscoe Professor of Architecture, University of Liverpool ==
In 1952 Gardner-Medwin was appointed the Roscoe Professor of Architecture at the Liverpool School of Architecture. He succeeded Lionel Budden who had taught him as a student. In his inaugural lecture, Gardner- Medwin emphasised his view of the architect as a team player rather like the conductor of an orchestra.

With his background in experimental housing units and health centres, Gardner-Medwin formed close ties with the Building Research Station (now the Building Research Establishment) and particularly with its chief architect Bill Allen. Allen was promoting a comprehensive pedagogical reform agenda aimed at a more 'scientific outlook' in the training of architects, not at the expense of creative design but as an essential precondition of it. Gardner-Medwin helped to establish the Department of Building Science which he envisaged as a postgraduate department of the School of Architecture, led by an architect, to nurture postgraduate research within the School and reframe its undergraduate teaching. He tried and failed to attract Bill Allen to lead it. In the event, however, it became part of the Faculty of Engineering, opening in 1957, and headed by a structural engineer. The School's first research unit was the Housing Research Unit sponsored by the Rowntree Trust, launched in 1963.

In the late 1950s, Gardner-Medwin was a member of the RIBA Council, its Board of Architectural Education and on three other influential committees that framed the RIBA's policy in the lead up to the Oxford Conference on Architectural Education held in 1958. He championed full-time education and an all-graduate architectural profession, and called for widening of postgraduate research in architecture schools.

In 1959, Gardner-Medwin founded the Bluecoat Display Centre, a craft gallery whose aim was to display and promote the work of leading designers.

== Architectural Projects ==
Gardner-Medwin's major architectural projects are to be found at the University of Edinburgh King's Buildings campus and comprise an extension to the Engineering Building (1957, in association with the architects Kingham Knight Associates); the Natural Resources and Biology Building (1965–66, also with Kingham Knight Associates); and the Hudson Beare Lecture Theatre (1961, in association with Stephenson Young & Partners). At Liverpool he designed the Science Lectures Theatres building (1966, in association with colleagues on the teaching staff).

== Retirement and committee work ==
He retired from the university in 1973 but served on various committees relating to architecture and conservation. He visited the School of Architecture regularly and played an active part in the preparations for the centenary of the School of Architecture in 1994. He was present at the centenary events and was made the first President of the then newly established Liverpool School of Architecture Society.

== Personal life ==
Gardner-Medwin married Margaret in 1935 and they had four sons. The eldest David Gardner-Medwin (1936–2014) became a leading paediatric neurologist in Newcastle-upon-Tyne. The youngest, Christopher Gardner-Medwin (1946–2022), was a successful architect. The family lived in a house he designed at Caldy Hill on the Wirral peninsula.
