= Elizabeth Towner =

Child health academic

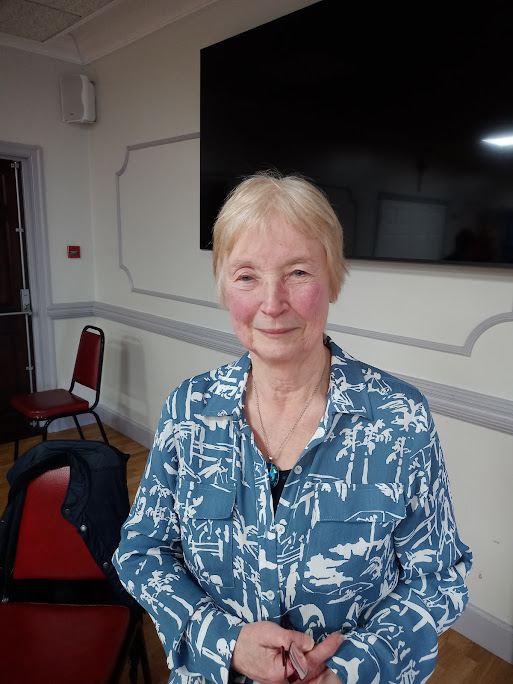
- Known for: child health; unintentional injury
- Scientific career
- Institutions: University of Newcastle; University of West of England

Elizabeth Towner was professor of child health at the University of the West of England. She took a first degree in geography at Durham University and subsequently has had a career in public health. The focus of her research was into translating theories of public health and records of unintentional injury to children into practical measures to reduce these risks, with road traffic injuries, drowning, poisoning, burns and falls being the most important causes. These injuries can take place anywhere, but there are specific concerns and safety measures possible for road traffic, children's centres, when cycling or playing near water and in the home. Since death from childhood illness has reduced, injuries have become the major cause of death in children and teenagers (aged 10 – 19) in many countries. Further millions of children require treatment for their injuries and may result in long-term disabilities. In 2004 she was a member of the World Health Organization's Child Injury Prevention Planning Group for the World Report on Child Injury that reported in 2008. She has also been part of international collaborations examining unintentional childhood injuries outside the UK.

Following her retirement around 2013, Towner has written a book about a nineteenth-century botanical artist, Margaret Rebecca Dickinson. She and her husband John are keen member of the Berwickshire Naturalists Club and they have published their book on "Apples and Pears: A History of Orchards in the Scottish Borders and North Northumberland".

== Publications ==
Towner is the author or co-author of over 60 scientific publications, reports and conference contributions. They include:

- Denise Kendrick, Joanne Ablewhite and 32 other authors including Elizabeth Toner (2017) Keeping Children Safe: a multicentre programme of research to increase the evidence base for preventing unintentional injuries in the home in the under-fives. Programme Grants for Applied Research. 5 pp 1–834.
- Kate Beckett, Trudy Goodenough, Toity Deave and 6 other authors including Elizabeth Toner (2014). Implementing an Injury Prevention Briefing to aid delivery of key fire safety messages in UK children's centres: Qualitative study nested within a multi-centre randomised controlled trial. BMC Public Health. 14 1256.
- Jenny Ingram, Toity Deave, Elizabeth Towner, Gail Errington, Bryony Kay & Denise Kendrick. (2012). Identifying facilitators and barriers for home injury prevention interventions for pre-school children: A systematic review of the quantitative literature. Health Education Research. 27 pp 258–68. 10.1093/her/cyr066.
- Elizabeth Towner and Julie Mytton (2009) Prevention of unintentional injuries in children. Paediatrics and Child Health 19 (11) pp517–521.
- Rachel Pain, Sue Grundy, Sally Gill and Elizabeth Towner (2005) 'So Long as I Take my Mobile': Mobile Phones, Urban Life and Geographies of Young People's Safety. International Journal of Urban and Regional Research 29 (4) pp814–830.
- Elizabeth Towner and John Towner (2000 Developing the history of unintentional injury: The use of coroners' records in early modern England. Injury Prevention 6 (2) pp102–5.
- Russell IT, Donaldson C, Foy CJW, Towner E, Philips PR, Parker L, McColl E, Hutchinson A, Humphrey RD, Ho M, Hewison J, Haimes E, Barton AG, Bamford C, Addington-Hall JM (1991) Performance review in British primary health care: an epidemiological and economic evaluation. In Primary Health Care, eds Bergerhoff P, Lehmann D and Novak P, Springer-Verlag, Berlin. ISBN 978-3540184263
