= Frank Allen (physicist) =

Canadian physicist

- Born: 1874; Meductic, New Brunswick
- Died: 19 November 1965 (aged 90–91)
- Awards: Henry Marshall Tory Medal (1944)
- Scientific career
- Fields: Physics
- Workplaces: University of Manitoba

Frank Allen, FRSC (1874 – 19 November 1965) was a Canadian academic and physicist, specializing in physiological optics.

== Biography ==
Born in New Brunswick, Frank Allen received his bachelor's degree in 1895 from the University of New Brunswick with highest honours in physics and chemistry and then his M.A. there in 1897. In 1902 he received his PhD in physics from Cornell University with a thesis on physiological optics. In 1904 Allen accepted the founding chair of the physics department at the University of Manitoba, serving as the head of the physics department until his retirement in 1944. In his career he published about 60 scientific papers, most of which concerned physiological optics and the physics of the other mammalian senses. He was also the author of two critically acclaimed books, The Universe, from Crystal Spheres to Relativity (1931) and Responses of the Organism to Stimulation (1971). In 1912, he was made a Fellow of the Royal Society of Canada. He was awarded the Society's Henry Marshall Tory Medal in 1944.

== Legacy ==
Frank Allen and his wife had a daughter, the artist Lillian B. Allen, and two sons. One was John Frank Allen, a noted low-temperature physicist. The other was Bill Allen a notable architect and building scientist who enjoyed a successful career as a researcher and practitioner in England, and was influential in determining the curriculum underpinning the education of UK architects to ensure it included some emphasis on science and technology.

The Allen Building on the University of Manitoba's Fort Garry Campus is named in honour of Frank Allen.
