= Gosforth Park =

Park in Newcastle upon Tyne, England

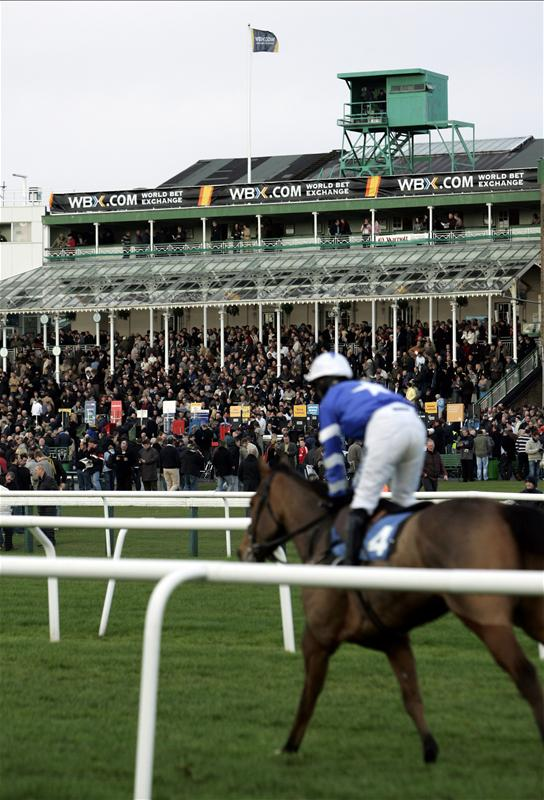
- Newcastle Racecourse in Gosforth Park

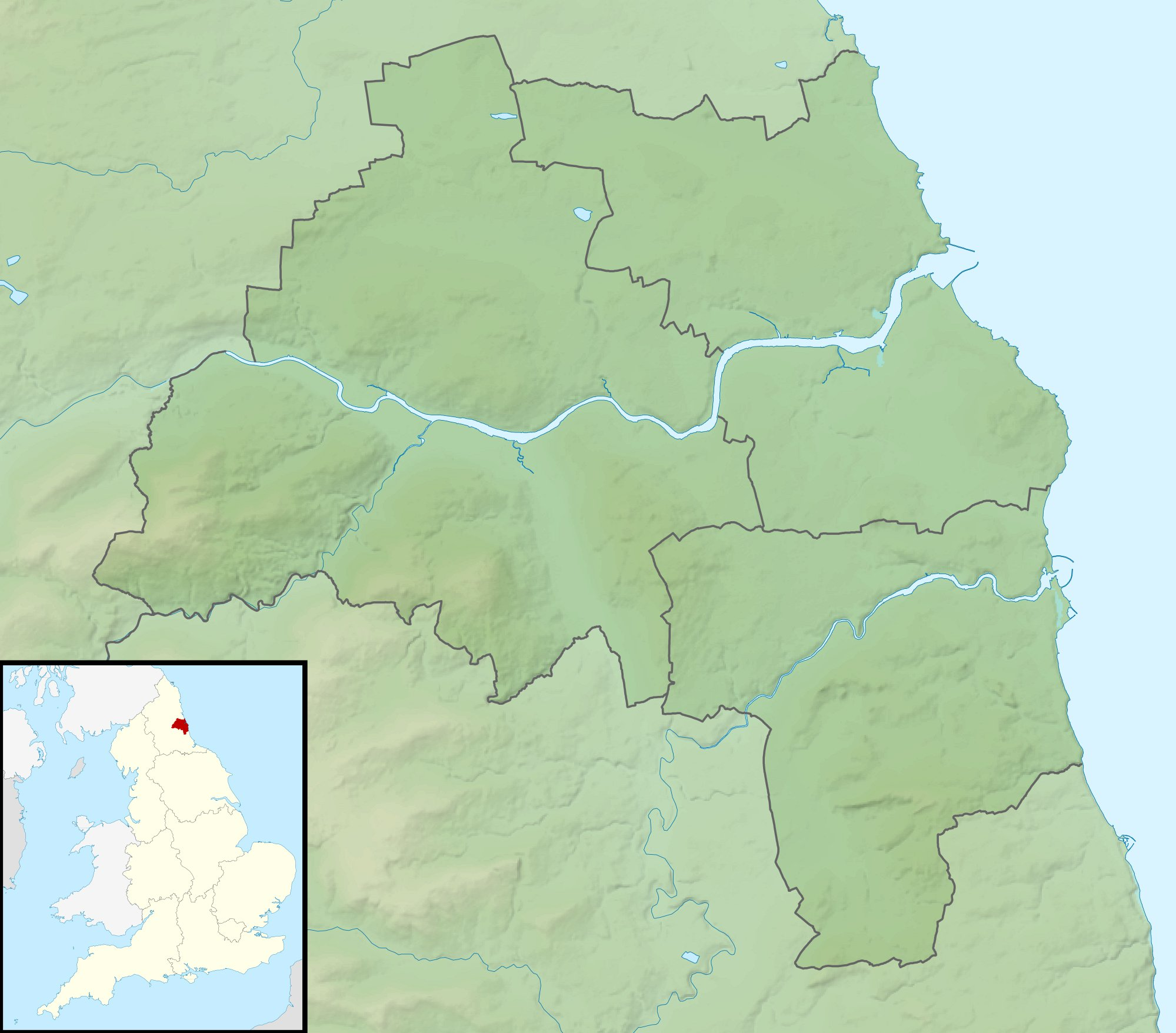
- Location within Tyne and Wear
- Location: Gosforth
- Nearest city: Newcastle upon Tyne
- Coordinates: 55.0311°N 1.6119°W
- Created: c. 1760

Gosforth Park is a park north of Gosforth in the city of Newcastle upon Tyne, England. It houses Newcastle Racecourse, Virgin Money Unity Arena, a Britannia hotel, two golf courses, a garden centre and a football centre. It is also home to Gosforth Nature Reserve, a private SSSI managed by the Natural History Society of Northumbria, consisting of a lake and woodland.

The park was laid out by Charles Brandling (1733–1802), a wealthy coal-mine owner and local politician, to adorn his new mansion, Gosforth House (now Brandling House, the racecourse hospitality and conference centre), built 1755–64.

Up to the 1950s tramcars came into the park on race days through a special gate from what was then the A1 Great North Road.

Between 2016 and 2019 the two walled gardens and icehouse at Gosforth Park were the subject of archaeological investigations by AAG Archaeology, prior to the gardens having houses built within them.

== Hotel ==
The Gosforth Park Hotel, now in the Britannia Hotels chain, was originally built in 1965 and opened by the Duke of Northumberland, and by 1986 was owned by Scottish & Newcastle and run by Thistle Hotels. Between being in the Thistle and Britannia portfolios it had been operated as a Marriott.

== Virgin Money Unity Arena ==
Virgin Money Unity Arena is the UK's first purpose built socially distanced outdoor entertainment venue constructed in the grounds of Gosforth Park. During 2020 the COVID-19 pandemic caused all concert and stand-up comedy events in the country to be cancelled. As the country came out of lockdown a number of efforts were made to re-start entertainment events including some drive-in venues.

The temporary outdoor venue site is 45,000 square metres (480,000 sq ft) and consists of 500 viewing spaces. Each socially distanced viewing space can occupy up to 5 people bringing the maximum capacity of the venue to 2500. The first two concerts on 11 and 13 August by North Tyneside singer Sam Fender sold out in minutes.

The venue is operated by SSD Concerts and Engine No.4. The event's title sponsor is the Virgin Money bank who have their headquarters in the nearby Regent Centre business park.
