= Cherryburn =

18th-century historic vernacular building in Mickley, Northumberland, England

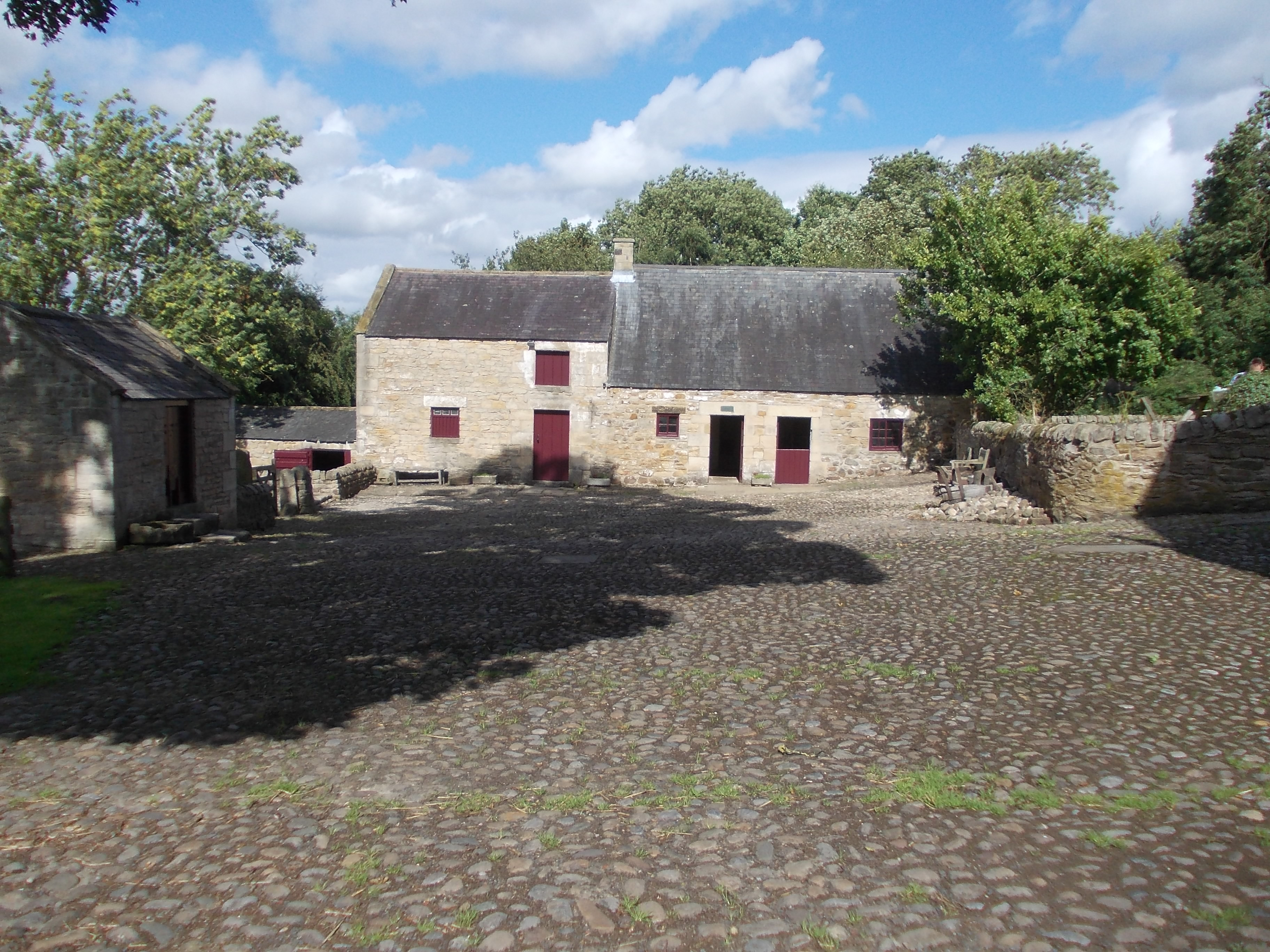
- Cherryburn cottage on a summer's day

- Location within Northumberland
- 54.957°N 1.884°W
- Nearest city: Newcastle upon Tyne

History
- Original use: Farm

Site notes
- Current use: Museum
- Owner: National Trust
- Website: https://www.nationaltrust.org.uk/visit/north-east/cherryburn

Cherryburn is a cottage in Mickley, Northumberland, England. It was the birthplace of Thomas Bewick, an English wood engraver and ornithologist. The cottage, its adjacent farmhouse and large grounds, have been managed by the National Trust since 1991 when they took over responsibility for the site from the Bewick Birthplace Trust. Cherryburn is open to the public.

== History ==
Thomas Bewick was born in the cottage in August 1753, he grew up there until the age of 14 when he moved to Newcastle upon Tyne to become a bound apprentice with the Beilby family.

The Cottage and the Farmhouse are now a museum to show what life was back when Thomas Bewick was alive. The Cottage has been furnished with items which would have been common at the time and the Farmhouse possesses a large collection of Bewick's publications, original engravings and printing equipment.

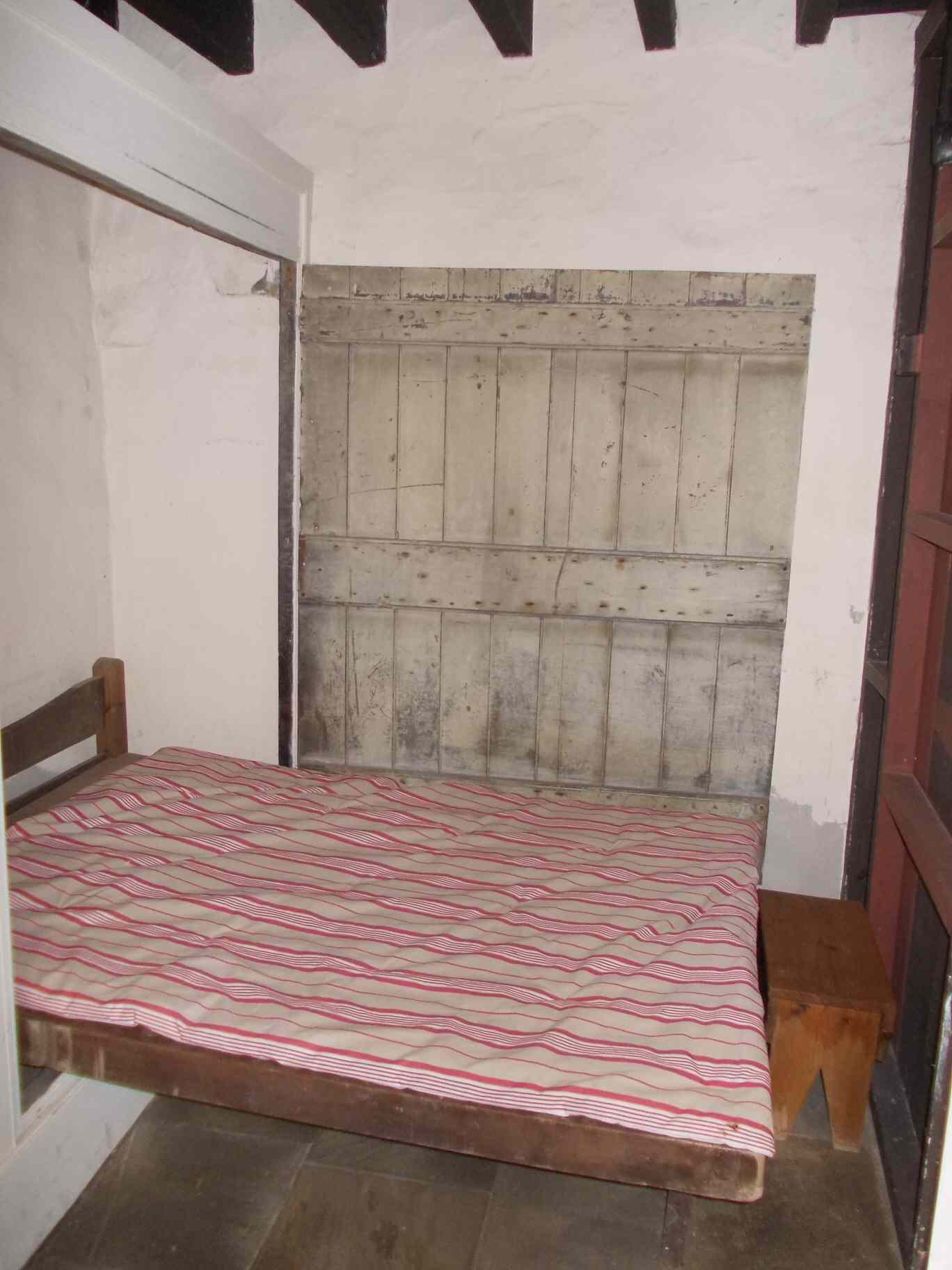
Cherryburn bed-in-a-cupboard. It folded away by day, letting the room be used as a parlour.

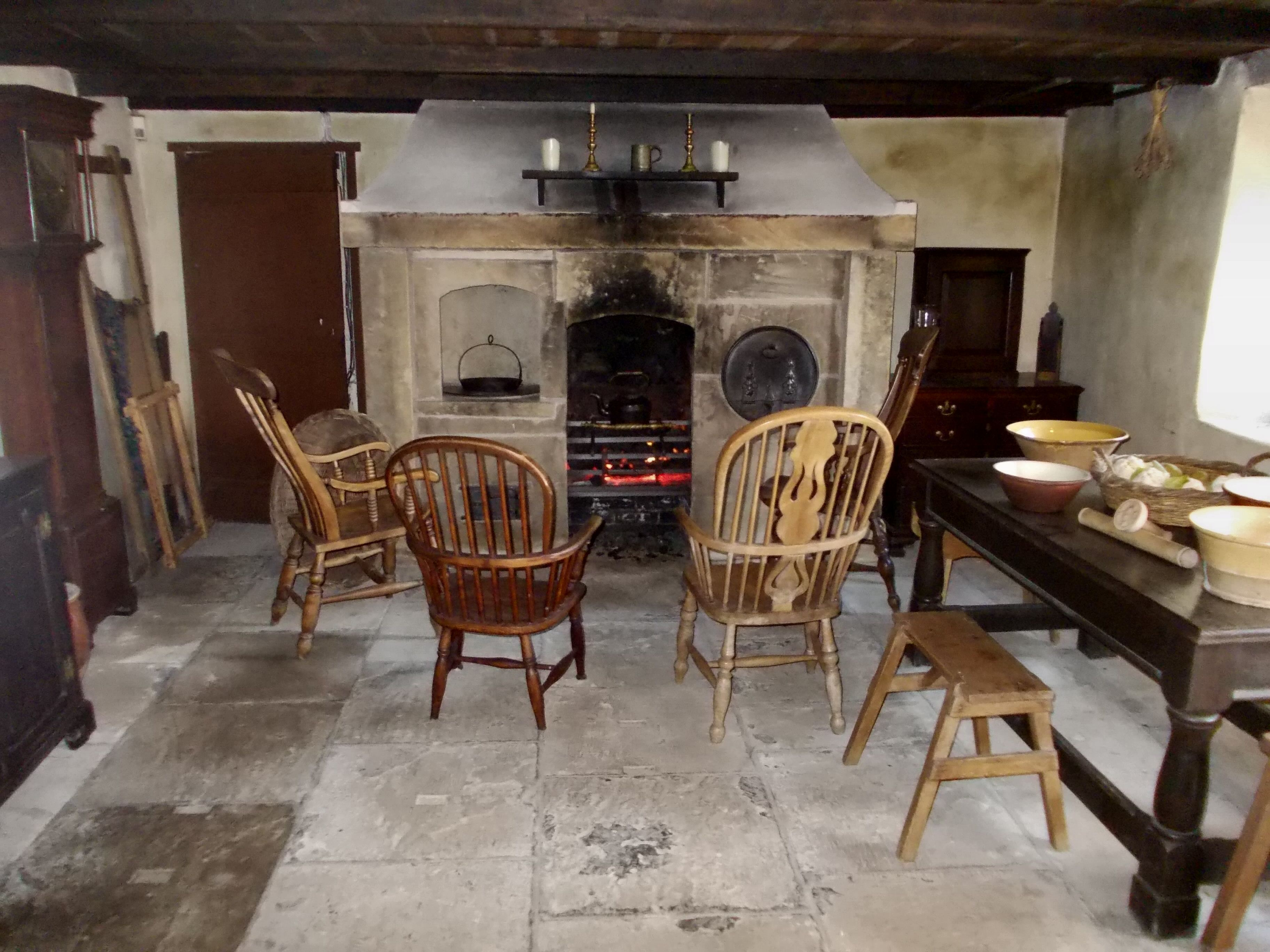
Cherryburn kitchen. It was the main room of the cottage, occupying most of the ground floor.

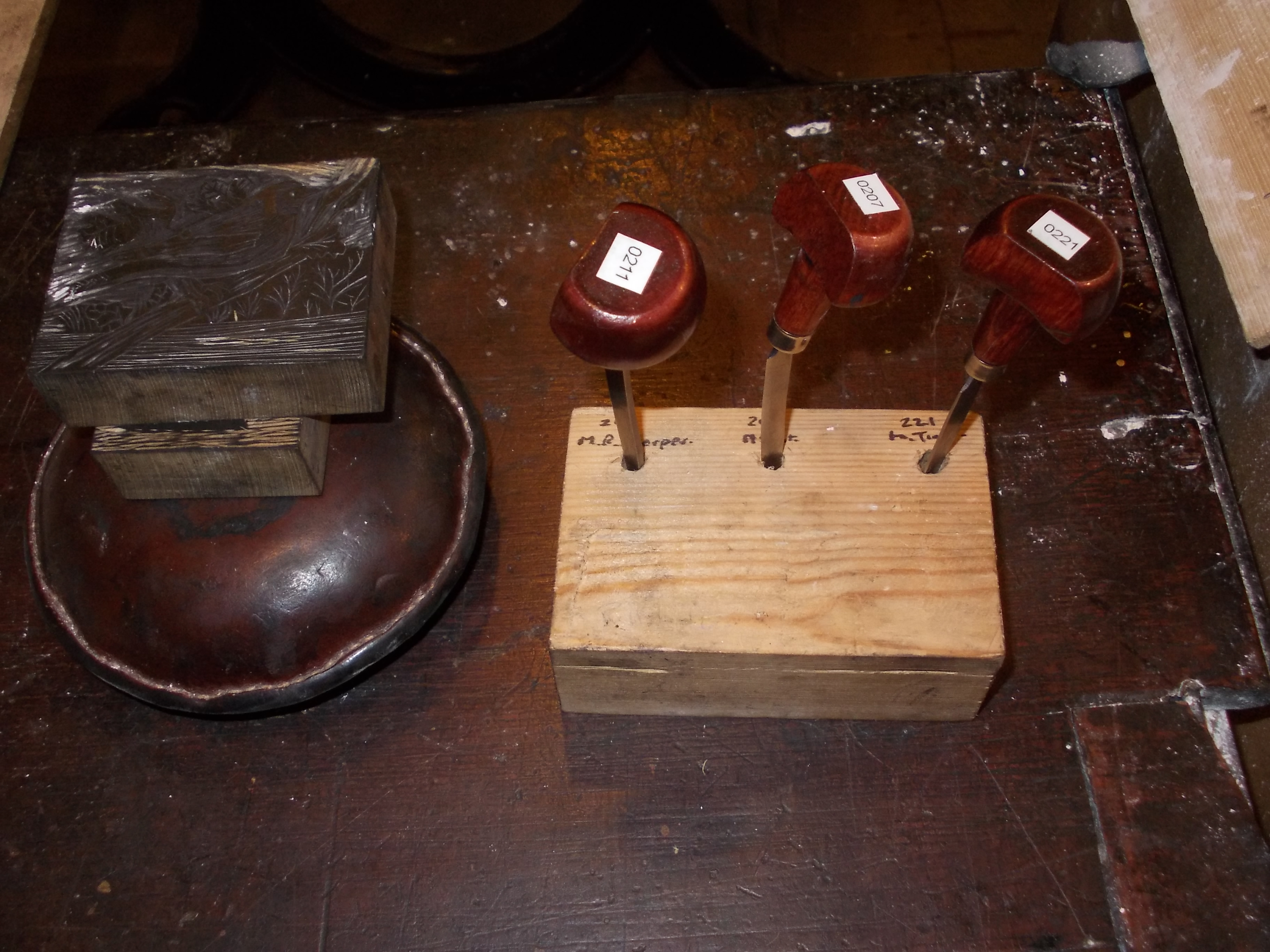
Some of Bewick's wood-engraving tools

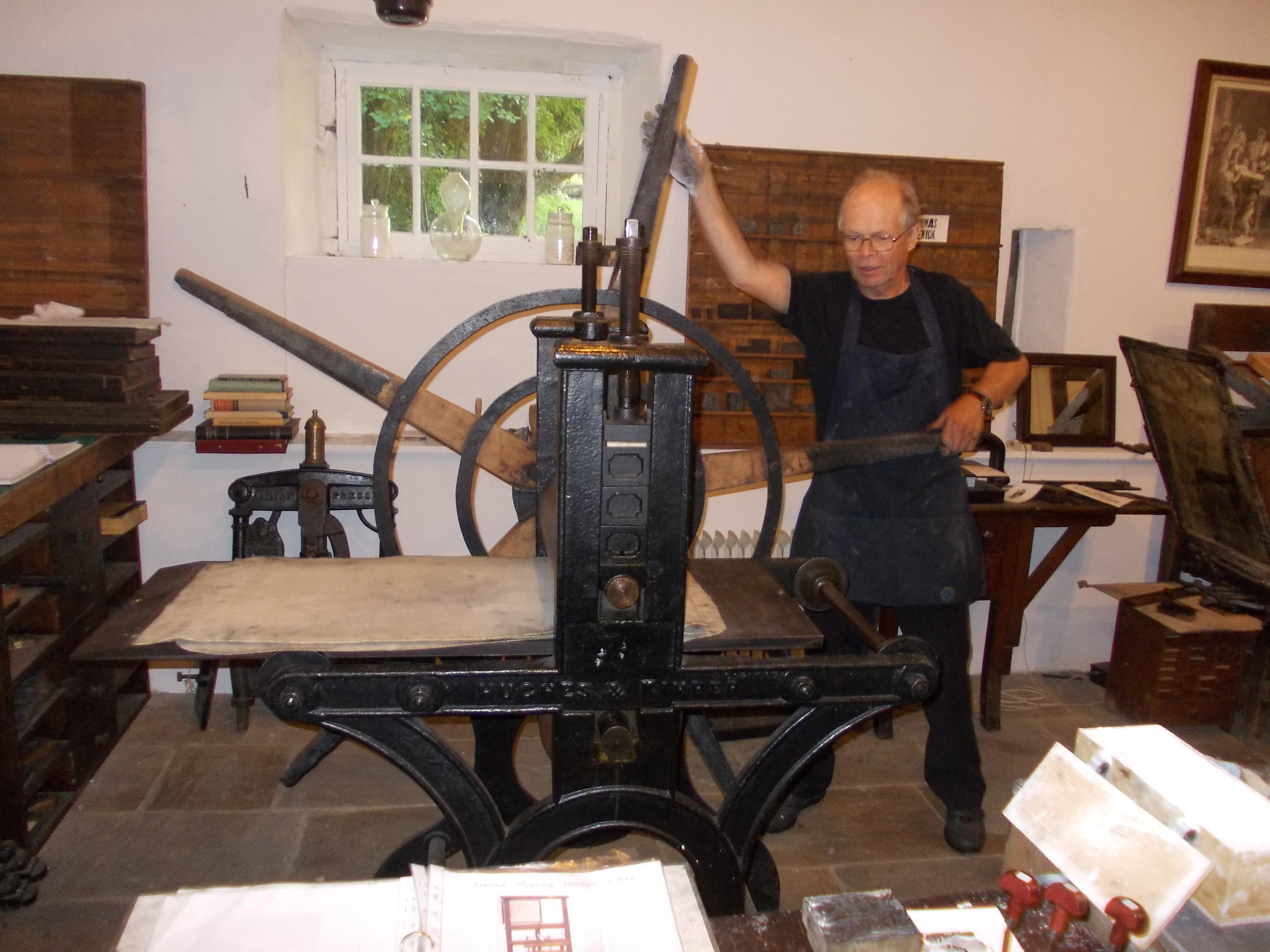
Printing demo

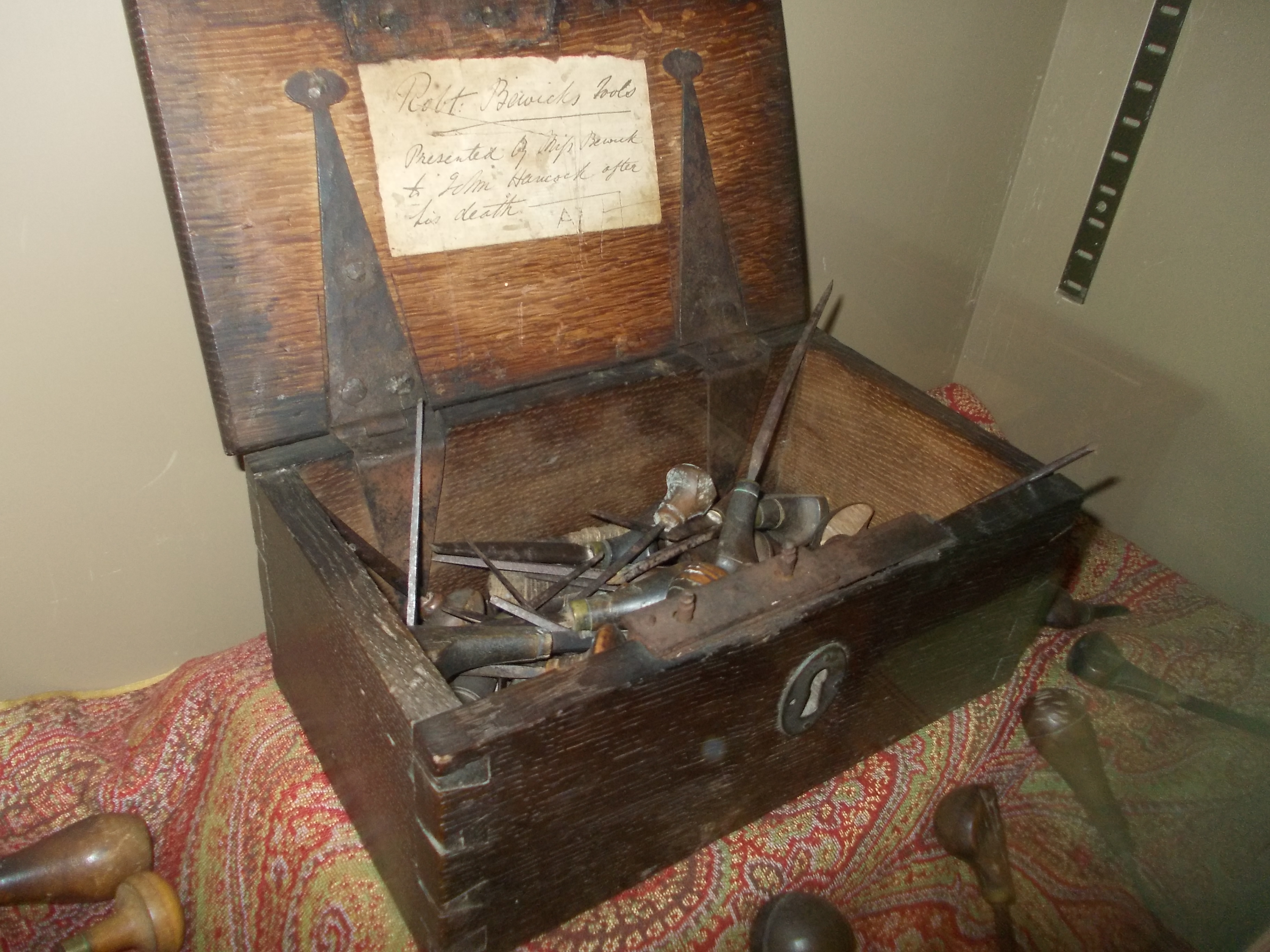
Box of Bewick's wood-engraving tools

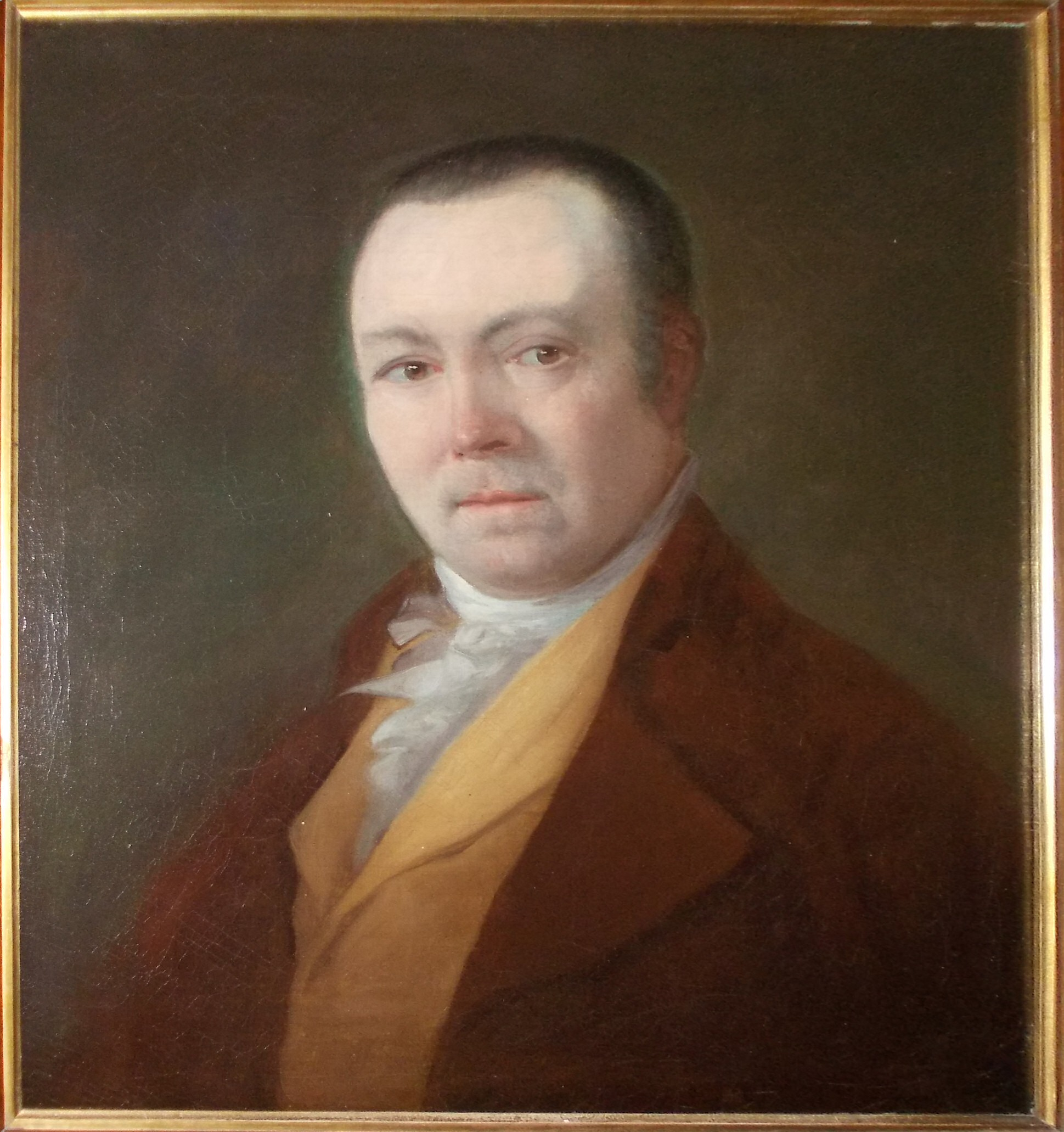
Thomas Bewick aged 40, unknown artist c. 1793

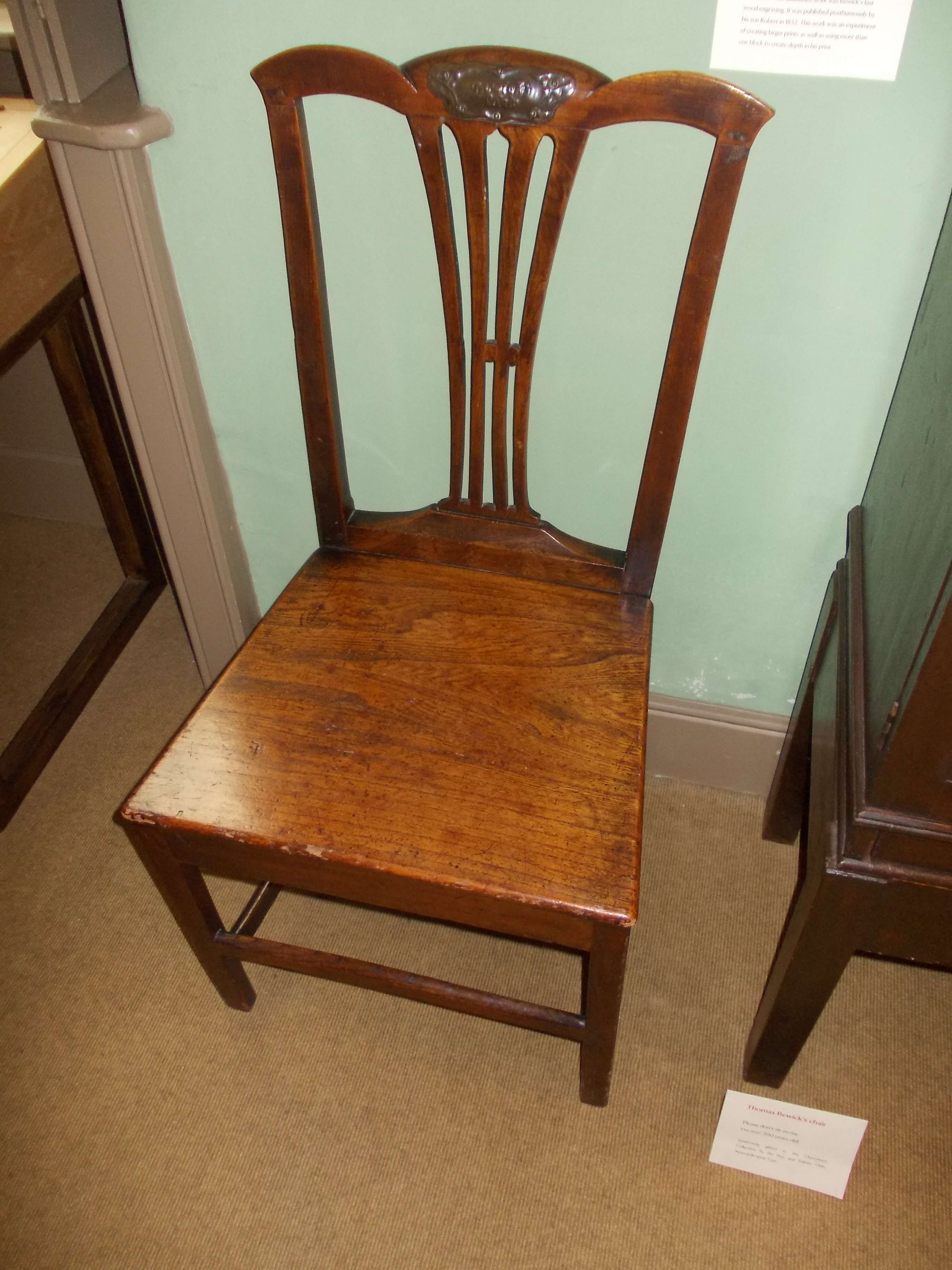
Bewick's chair

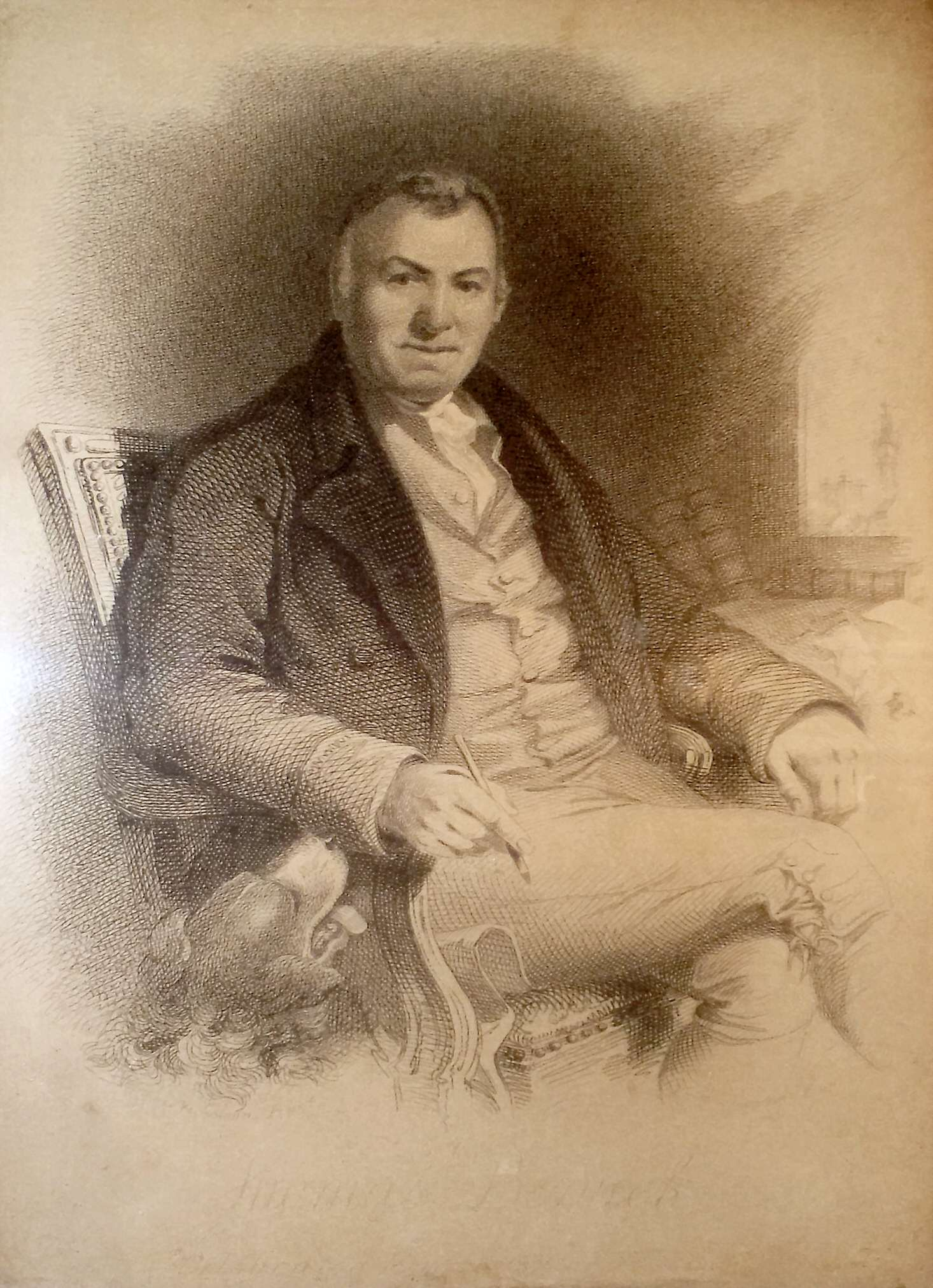
Drawing of Thomas Bewick with his pencil and dog
