= Gosforth House =

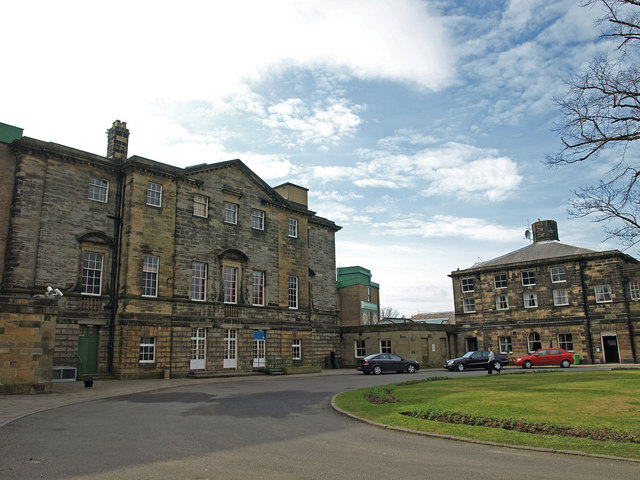
- Gosforth House

- Location in Tyne and Wear

General information
- Location: Tyne and Wear, England, UK
- Coordinates: 55.035°N 1.613°W
- OS grid: NZ248712

Gosforth House now known as Brandling House is a Grade II listed building built as a mansion house and now serving as a hospitality and conference centre at Gosforth Park Racecourse, Newcastle upon Tyne, England.

== History ==
The Gosforth Park estate of about 2,000 acres (8.1 km^{2}) was owned from about 1509 by the Brandling family. The house was built between 1755 and 1764 for Charles Brandling (1733–1802) to a design by architect James Paine. Brandling also laid out the park and a 50-acre (200,000 m^{2}) lake.

Charles John Brandling (1769–1826) suffered financial problems as a result of which the estate was sold, in 1852, to Thomas Smith. In 1880, the house was sold with 807 acres (3.3 km^{2}) to High Gosforth Park Ltd, a company formed to establish a racecourse on the estate. A fire started by suffragettes in 1914 destroyed the interior of the property. Norah Balls admitted late in life to having been involved in the arson attack. Restoration of the house took place in 1921.
