= Northumberland Archives =

County archive for Northumberland, England

Northumberland Archives holds the archives for the county of Northumberland. The archives are held at Woodhorn and Berwick-upon-Tweed and run by Northumberland County Council.

The Diocese of Newcastle appointed Northumberland Archives their diocesan record office in 1966. The Woodhorn office preserves and makes accessible the archival records of the diocese and the parishes within the diocese. The parish registers of baptisms, marriages and burials are frequently used by family historians. A list of the Anglican parishes and the registers which are available can be seen here.

In 2018 Northumberland Archives at Woodhorn was awarded full accredited status by The National Archives. The accreditation award is a badge of external recognition which demonstrates that the service meets nationally recognised standards. The full accreditation was reapplied for and awarded in 2021 and 2024.

== History ==
Northumberland County Council established a Records Committee in 1957 to address the requirements of the Public Records Act 1958. At that time, the Council had a store of records in the basement of the Moothall in Newcastle in the custody of the Clerk to the County Council, E. P. Harvey. The first County Archivist, H. A. Taylor, took up the post in 1958 and started working on processing the records at the Moothall. William Dickson, the Clerk of the Peace (1844-1875), had previously arranged some of the oldest Quarter Sessions records "...with care and no little artistic skill..." In a newspaper article from 1958, a need was identified for increased storage to accommodate the records likely to absorbed by the new service due to the break up of family estates and the pressure on legal firms to store their records. Estate papers and the records of legal firms still make up a significant portion of the holdings of the archives.

In 1962 the County Council purchased the former Anti-Aircraft Operations Central Control building at Melton Park, which was formally opened by the Duke of Northumberland in 1964. The new building was described as "...in effect, a vast strong room partically sunk in the ground, walled, rooted and floored with reinforced concrete centrally heated and air conditioned."

The Berwick-upon-Tweed Record Office opened in 1980. The borough collection for the town is one of the largest archives that the record office preserves. Until 1978 the borough records were kept at Berwick Town Hall, they were then moved to council premises at Wallace Green, which had been Berwick gaol. A newspaper article from 1988 states that records were held in three former police cells. The record office temporarily moved to the Workspace on Marygate in 2015 and then to Berwick Library in June 2016.

The county council opened a further repository in 1989. The Modern Records Centre on the Kylins estate in Morpeth was seen as something of an innovation, with Deputy County Archivist Bob Stewart, proudly announcing that their new computer would aid "...stricter control of records."

In 2007 the Morpeth and Gosforth offices of Northumberland Archives merged and relocated to new premises at Woodhorn Museum.
