= Henry George Albert Hickling =

British geologist

Henry George Albert Hickling FRS
- Born: 5 April 1883; Nottingham
- Died: 26 July 1954 (aged 71)
- Education: University of Manchester BSc (1905, Geology)
- Spouse(s): Gertrude Hermine Geiler (m. 1910; d. 1952); Grace Watt, m. 1954.
- Awards: Murchison Medal (1934)
- Scientific career
- Fields: Paleontology, paleobotany and geology
- Workplaces: University of Manchester; University of Newcastle

Henry George Albert Hickling FRS (5 April 1883 – 26 July 1954) was a British geologist and palaeontologist, who worked on fossil reptile footprints, the structures of fossil plants, coals and the Old Red Sandstone. He was awarded the Murchison Medal of the Geological Society of London in 1934, and elected to the Royal Society in 1936.

== Life and works ==
Hickling, who was known as George, was born and brought up in Nottingham until the age of sixteen. He then lived in Arbroath for three years, where he developed his interest in geology. In 1902, Hickling went to the University of Manchester to study geology, and graduated in 1905 with first class honours. In 1906, he became a demonstrator in the same department, where he taught and conducted research for the next 14 years, rising to the post of reader in 1917.

During this period he was elected to membership Manchester Literary and Philosophical Society on 15 October 1907, and later served as Secretary (1909–20). In 1920, Hickling was appointed to the chair of geology at Armstrong College, which later became King's College, Newcastle-upon-Tyne. He retired in 1948, and was succeeded by Thomas Stanley Westoll.

At various times during his career, Hickling served on a number of academic and other committees, including the council of the Geological Society of London; as chair of the management committee of the Hancock museum in Newcastle; and as president of the geology section of the British Association for the Advancement of Science.

According to Hickling's biographers, he was well known for his slow and clear tempo while speaking; and the great speed with which he would walk across the countryside, and drive his car.

== Awards ==
Hickling was awarded the Murchison Medal in 1934, and elected Fellow of the Royal Society in 1936.

== Family ==
Hickling married Gertrude Hermine Geiler in 1910. She was a medical doctor, who graduated in medicine from the University of Manchester and later worked as an anaesthetist at Manchester Children's Hospital and as a child welfare officer for the Newcastle Corporation. She was active in the British Federation of University Women, and in the Tyneside Nursery Schools association, and played an important role in establishing nursery school provision in Newcastle and Gateshead. Geiler died in 1952. They had one son and two daughters. Hickling married Grace Watt, a naturalist and ornithologist shortly before he died in 1954.

Professional and academic associations
Preceded by Charles Gordon Hewitt	Secretary of the Manchester Literary and Philosophical Society; 1909–20	Succeeded by Tom Hatherley Pear
