= Thomas Hickling =

English cricketer

Personal information
- Full name: Thomas Leslie Hickling
- Born: 4 January 1940 (age 86); Roydon, Norfolk, England
- Batting: Left-handed

Domestic team information
- Years: Team
- 1969–1970: Buckinghamshire

Career statistics
Competition	List A
Matches	2
Runs scored	2
Batting average	1.00
100s/50s	–/–
Top score	2
Balls bowled	–
Wickets	–
Bowling average	–
5 wickets in innings	–
10 wickets in match	–
Best bowling	–
Catches/stumpings	1/–
- Source: Cricinfo, 7 May 2011

Thomas Leslie Hickling (born 4 January 1940) is a former English cricketer. Hickling was a left-handed batsman. He was born in Roydon, Norfolk.

Hickling made his debut for Buckinghamshire in the 1969 Minor Counties Championship against Oxfordshire. Hickling played Minor counties cricket for Buckinghamshire from 1969 to 1970, which included 12 Minor Counties Championship matches. In 1970, he made his List A debut against Bedfordshire in the Gillette Cup. In this match he opened the batting, but was dismissed for a duck by Trevor Morley. Despite this, Buckinghamshire won by 8 wickets. In the following round against Hampshire, he scored 2 runs before being dismissed by Butch White, with Buckinghamshire losing by 142 runs. These were his only List A appearances.

Hickling has previously represented the Essex Second XI in the Minor Counties Championship and Second XI Championship between 1959 and 1960.
