= Lillian B. Allen =

Canadian academic and photographer (1904–1994)

Lillian Beatrice Allen
- Lillian B. Allen, 1969
- Born: November 9, 1904; Winnipeg, Manitoba, Canada
- Died: November 13, 1994 (aged 90); Victoria, British Columbia, Canada
- Known for: Painter, photographer, educator

Lillian Beatrice Allen (November 9, 1904 – November 13, 1994) was a Canadian painter, teacher and nature photographer. She is known for her photographs which had been shown at the University of Manitoba and the publication of Frost: Photographs by Lillian Allen in 1990.

== Early life ==
Allen was born in Winnipeg, Manitoba, in 1904. She was the eldest of three children of the Canadian physicist Frank Allen (1874–1965) and Sarah Estelle.

== Education ==
In 1926 Allen received her B.A. in Liberal Arts from the University of Manitoba. She subsequently studied art at the Winnipeg School of Art, where she received a diploma, and went on to teach Saturday morning classes. In 1947 she received her MSc from Syracuse University.

== Career ==
From 1934, she lectured at the University of Manitoba on housing and design, as part of the Faculty of Agriculture and Home Economics. She retired as an associate professor in 1971. She also gave public lectures on various topics. In 1976, she had a full-color photography show, "Ice and Frost" at the Langley Centennial Museum. Allen also took an interest in modern furniture, publishing her university thesis A Study of the Design of Furniture Constructed from New Materials from 1925 to 1945 in 1947.

After her retirement she pursued her career as a nature photographer, publishing the book Frost: Photographs in 1990 (Hyperion Press: ISBN 9780920534892). Her photographs were also shown at the University of Manitoba and the Winnipeg School of Art.

Allen was active in the artistic community of Manitoba, being a founder member of the Volunteer Committee of Winnipeg Art Gallery and teaching at the Crafts Guild of Manitoba. In 1980, she received the "Woman of the Year Award" from the YWCA.

== Later life ==
Allen moved to Victoria, British Columbia in 1981. Allen's papers are in the collection of the University of Manitoba.
