= Evelyn M. Lobley =

British bryologist (1902–1977)

Evelyn M. Lobley

Evelyn M. Lobley (1902–1977) was a bryologist and botanical collector in northern England. She was president of the British Bryological Society 1960–1961.

Lobley lived in Hexham, Northumbria and was an active member of the Natural History Society of Northumbria. She made significant contributions to the British Bryological Society which she had joined in 1933. As well as recording and mapping the moss flora around her home area in Northumberland and County Durham, she also travelled frequently to the highlands of Scotland and the Outer Hebrides to record mosses with others in the society such as Ursula Duncan and Kathleen Blackburn. She was one of the three national referees for Sphagnum from 1951 for two decades. She was president of the British Bryological Society 1960–1961.

During the Second World War she worked as a hospital radiographer.

In 1948 she collected specimens in Scotland of what was later identified as the first UK record of water rock-bristle moss Seligeria carniolica and in 1964 she found this moss in England, although could not re-locate it in Scotland. The moss was re-found in the same place in Scotland in 2014, having not been seen for many intervening decades.

== Publications ==
Lobley was co-author of a number of scientific publications. They include:

- E. M. Lobley and J. W. Fitzgerald (1970) A Revision of the Genus Sphagnum L. in a Flora of the North-East of Ireland. E. M. Lobley (1965) The Irish Naturalists' Journal 16, (12) pp. 357–365.
- E. M. Lobley (1965) Trochobryum carniolicum Breidl. & Beck in England. Transactions of the British Bryological Society, 4, pp 828–830.
- E. M. Lobley (1958) The Meeting of the British Bryological Society in Co. Galway. The Irish Naturalists' Journal 12 (11) pp. 285–290.

== Legacy ==
A collection of 4,500 of Lobley's moss specimens along with some books and manuscripts is held in the herbarium at the Great North Museum: Hancock in Newcastle upon Tyne. Her manuscript draft of a bryological flora of Roxburgh is at the Royal Botanic Garden Edinburgh.
