= Natural History Society of Northumbria =

UK natural history organization

Coordinates: 54°58′48.9″N 1°36′46.9″W

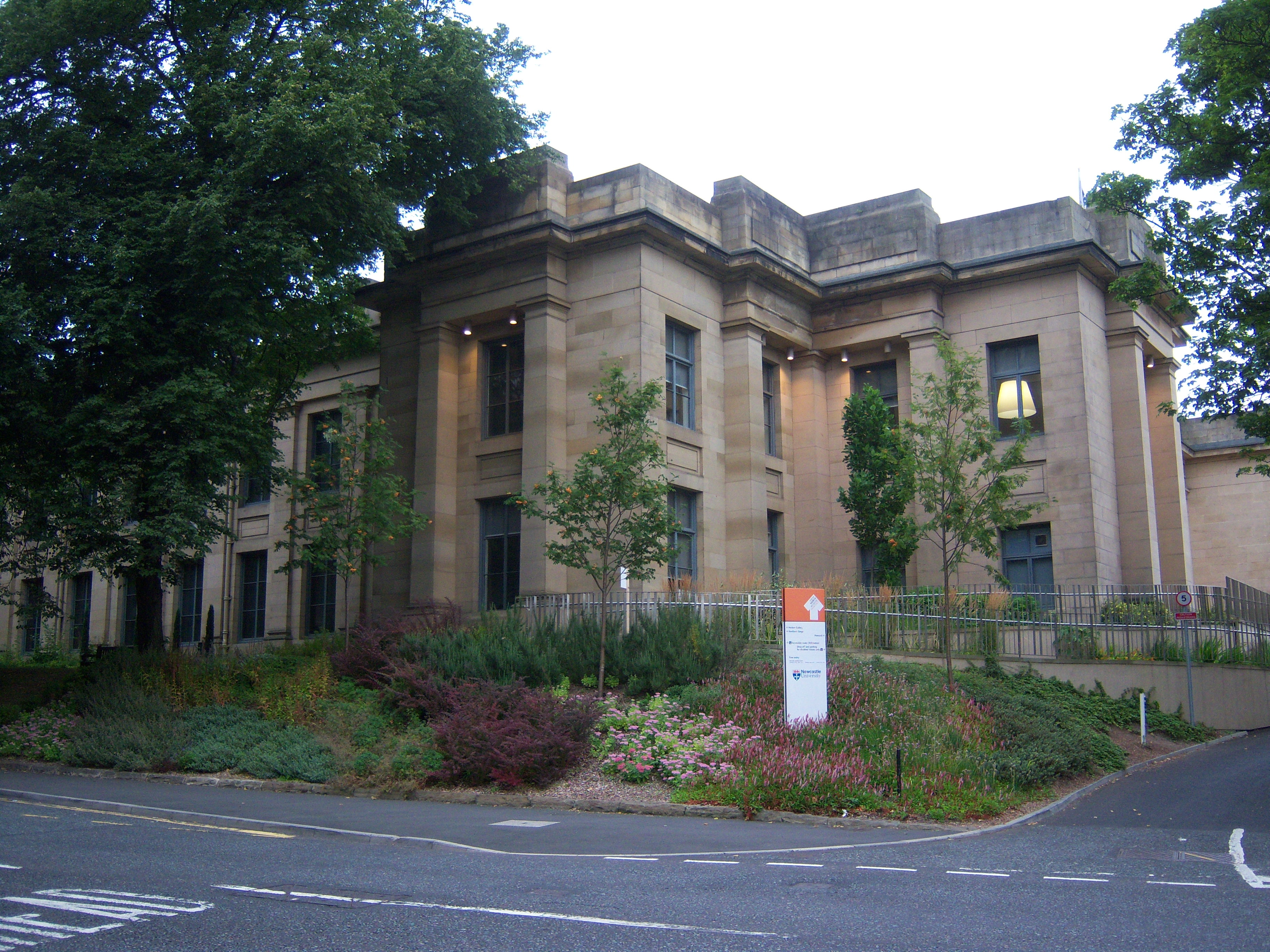
- Hancock Museum (wherein are its offices)
- Founded: 19 August 1829
- Type: Registered charity
- Purpose: To study and conserve wildlife
- Location: Great North Museum: Hancock, Barras Bridge, Newcastle-upon-Tyne, United Kingdom
- Region served: North East of England
- Website: www.nhsn.org.uk

The Natural History Society of Northumbria (NHSN) is a voluntary organization to promote the study of natural history and protect the wildlife of North East England.

Its offices and library are in the Great North Museum: Hancock, whose building, land and collections it owns. It leases them to Newcastle University, on whose behalf they are administered by Tyne & Wear Archives & Museums. It possesses a substantial natural history library and archive and maintains the Gosforth Nature Reserve, one of the oldest designated nature reserves in North East England. It also carries out research and provides talks, field trips and educational courses, as well as publishing scientific papers.

== Gosforth Nature Reserve ==
NHSN has managed Gosforth Nature Reserve since 1929. This 1 km x 1 km wildlife refuge north of Newcastle upon Tyne includes a shallow lake with extensive reed bed, mixed woodland and small areas of wildflower meadow. The reserve is scientifically important for its uncommon flora and fauna, which includes bittern, kingfisher, otter, coralroot orchid and purple hairstreak butterfly.

The reserve has hides and boardwalks that enable visitors to view waterfowl, waders and reed bed birds at one of the most popular birdwatching sites in the Newcastle area. Woodland trails and a feeding station provide an opportunity to see a wide range of woodland birds, mammals and flowers. Access to the reserve is restricted to NHSN members or those who purchase a Visitor Pass from the Welcome Hut upon arrival.

== Publications ==
The North East Naturalist journal (known as the Transactions until 2009) has been published by NHSN since 1831. This journal contains scientific papers, research and observations about natural history across Northumbria and is the only journal of its kind in the North East. North East Coastal Wildlife is published in partnership with various conservation organisations that manage designated sites along the Northumberland coast. This annual report records the number of pairs of breeding birds on the Farne Islands, a bird ringing report and an account of all the rarities observed during the time the wardens are in residence. The latter also includes details about cetacean sightings, information on the Farne Islands grey seal colony and an account of butterfly and moth records.

== Activities ==
NHSN continues to provide a range of field trips, events and education courses] designed to inspire wonder in the natural world, as well as informative public talks on Monday evenings throughout the winter period. More recently, the organisation launched its 1829 Talks – delivered by early-career scientists studying at local universities.

NHSN remains active in conservation and research in North East England, contributing to various committees concerned with the protection of the region's wildlife. Through bird ringing, biological recording and small grants in sponsorship of local environmental studies, it continues to be actively involved in monitoring the fortunes of local wildlife. More recently, NHSN also launched several citizen science projects including the North East Bee Hunt and North East Ladybird Spot. From Heather Ladybirds to inconspicuous ladybirds, the latter has already revealed several notable discoveries.

NHSN continues to support the development of young naturalists through its Student Award Scheme and support through its Young Naturalist Lantern Fund.

== History ==
The key events in the history of the NHSN are as follows.

- NHSN was formed on 19 August 1829 as an offshoot of the Literary and Philosophical Society of Newcastle upon Tyne, which had been founded in 1793. It was initially named the Natural History Society of Northumberland, Durham and Newcastle upon Tyne, and acquired its present name later. It began with a membership of 134.
- In 1832, in order to house the NHSN collections, subscriptions were raised to build a new museum, the Newcastle Museum. This was on land behind the Literary & Philosophical Society's building (now part of Newcastle station). It was opened to the public in 1834.
- In 1878, plans were announced for the building of a bigger museum, the Great North Museum: Hancock (as it is now called). John Hancock (see below), a local naturalist and taxidermist, was the driving force behind the project. The Prince and Princess of Wales officially opened the Museum on 20 August 1884, amid great celebrations hosted by Sir William and Lady Armstrong of Cragside. It was named the Hancock Museum in 1891 in memory of John and Albany Hancock, and acquired its present name in 2009 after a refurbishment.
- In 1923, a meeting of Natural History Society of Northumberland, Durham and Newcastle upon Tyne made a public appeal for funds to enable the purchase of the Farne Islands and then to hand them over to the National Trust
- In 1924, the Gosforth Nature Reserve came into being, initially as a bird sanctuary, when W. E. Beck, a member of the Society, leased the shooting rights over Gosforth Park from its owners, the High Gosforth Park Company. In 1929, Mr Beck, suffering ill health, handed over these rights to NHSN, which has managed it for wildlife ever since.
- In 1949, NHSN became the official bird-ringing organization for the Farne Islands, and this work continues today. In 1951, the Society began to systematically study grey seals on the Farne Islands, commencing the longest period of continuous research in any British grey seal colony.
- In 1960, NHSN, struggling to maintain the Hancock Museum, reached an agreement with Kings College (now Newcastle University) in which the latter acquired a 99-year lease of the museum and collections. A management committee was created and made responsible for running the museum and preserving the collection. The organisation is still represented on this today.
- In 1961–62, NHSN helped in the birth of the Northumberland and Durham Naturalists' Trust, now the Northumberland Wildlife Trust and Durham Wildlife Trust. A symbiotic relationship exists with these to this day.
- In 2006, the Hancock Museum was taken out of service and extensively refurbished, re-emerging as part of the Great North Museum in 2009.

== Notable members ==
In chronological order (by date of demise):

- William Loftus (c.1821–1858) was an English archaeologist and traveller.
- Joshua Alder (1792–1867) was an amateur zoologist and malacologist specialising in tunicates and gastropods.
- Albany Hancock (1806–1873) was the brother of the ornithologist John Hancock and specialised in the anatomy of sea creatures especially sea slugs or nudibranchs, depicting them in minute detail. His watercolour drawings are held in the Society's archives.
- William Chapman Hewitson (1806–1878) was a wealthy collector, particularly of beetles, lepidopterans, bird's nests and eggs. He built up an extensive collection of butterflies of the world and was an accomplished illustrator.
- John Hancock (1808–1890) was an ornithologist, produced his Catalogue of the Birds of Northumberland and Durham in 1874. His greatest talent, however, was taxidermy and his collection of mounted British birds can still be seen today in the Bird Gallery of the Great North Museum: Hancock.
- Mary Jane Hancock (1810–1896) was an amateur botanist and enthusiastic watercolour painter, and the youngest sister of John and Albany Hancock. The Natural History Society of Northumbria holds over 60 of her paintings and more than 300 botany specimens from her personal collections.
- Marie Victoire Lebour (1876–1971) studied the life cycles of many aquatic organisms, rearing them from eggs to larvae and on through metamorphosis to adulthood, using the newly invented plunger jars which kept water flowing and full of oxygen. Her knowledge has contributed to our understanding of marine organisms from herring fish to single-cell diatoms.
- Grace Hickling (1908–1986) had a long association with the Farne Islands as a researcher and conservationist. She became the public face of the islands and played a key role in ensuring that they were recognised nationally for their importance as a habitat for seals and seabirds.
- David Gardner-Medwin (1936–2014) was a paediatric neurologist who worked with children with Duchenne muscular dystrophy. In 1966 he became involved with the Natural History Society of Northumbria, for which he was once chairman of its library committee and later chairman of its council.

== Sources ==
- White, John Talbot (1973). The Scottish Border and Northumberland. London: Eyre Metheun. ISBN 0 413 30270 9.
