= Kathleen Bever Blackburn =

British botanist

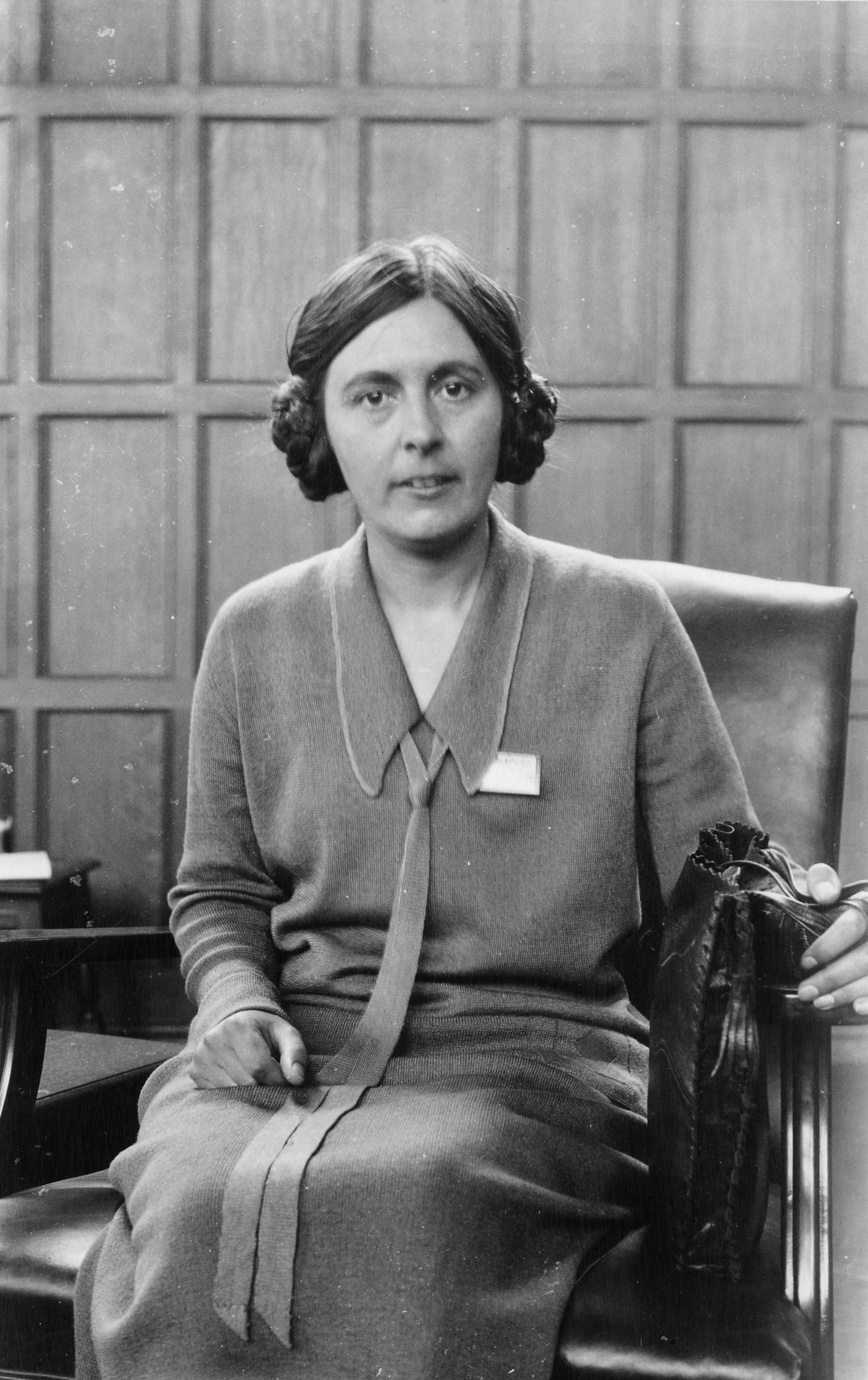
- Blackburn, probably in 1926 when attending the International Botanical Congress at Ithaca, New York
- Born: 1892
- Died: August 1968 (aged 75–76)
- Citizenship: British
- Scientific career
- Fields: Botany
- Institutions: Armstrong College

Kathleen Bever Blackburn, FLS (1892–1968) was a British botanist best remembered for the 1923 discovery that plant cells have sex chromosomes. Her principal contributions were in plant cytology and genetics. She was also a pioneer of pollen analysis. She taught botany at Armstrong College, Durham University (later renamed King's College, now Newcastle University) from 1918 to 1957.

== Early life ==
Kathleen Bever Blackburn was born in 1892. Her middle name is sometimes incorrectly given as "Beyer". Her father, E. P. Blackburn, was a prominent minister in the Methodist Church, ending his career at Jesmond after a number of ministries around the United Kingdom. Kathleen Blackburn and her sister Dorothy were active members of the congregation. Their father was a noted naturalist and amateur conchologist.

She studied at Bedford College, University of London, from which she graduated with a Bachelor of Science (BSc) degree in 1912 and a Master of Science (MSc) degree in 1914.

== Career ==
From 1914 to 1916, Blackburn was a lecturer in botany at the Southlands Training College, Battersea, London. She was appointed a lecturer in botany at Armstrong College, Newcastle upon Tyne, in 1918, made Reader in Cytology in 1947. She was Supervisor of Research in the Department of Botany in 1949, and retired in 1957.

=== Research ===
At Newcastle, her research resulted in many papers, frequently co-authored with J.W. Heslop-Harrison, her head of department at Armstrong College, 1927–1946. Her first published work, in 1917, was an anatomical study of vascular tissue in seedlings of the buttercup family, Ranunculaceae and others.

Papers in 1921, 1924 and 1925 explored the chromosome complements of British roses (Rosa species). In these, she showed that the basal number of chromosomes in the nucleus of the cells of roses is seven, that different forms of roses were in fact polyploids arising by hybridisation, and that examination of the chromosomes was a means of clarifying taxonomic relationships. Her work on roses made her reputation, at home and abroad. In 1924, she attended the British Association meeting in Toronto. A suffragette magazine, The Women’s Leader (1924) said: "Botanical research is another field in which women will be represented ... Sir Frederick Keeble paid a glowing tribute ... [Blackburn] had solved the well nigh insoluble riddle of cross-fertilization of the rose".

She then studied the campions (genus Silene) and established that female and male flowers of these plants had X and Y sex chromosomes (Blackburn 1923, 1924). She was the first to correctly identify the Y chromosome as the larger of the two, in Silene latifolia. Prior to these discoveries by her and others it had not been realised that plants could have sex chromosomes. The fact that X and Y sex chromosomes are actually quite rare in plants, occurring only in a minority of dioecious species (in which the male and female flowers are borne on separate individuals), was known to her.

By the 1930s, Blackburn had become adept at pollen analysis, especially of grains found in peat. This led on to investigations, with others, concerning the nunatak theory of repopulation of landscapes after glaciations. In the 1940s she became involved in researching soils and peat bogs in connection with the development of the Kielder Forest by the Forestry Commission. Her skills at reconstructing past vegetation using both pollen analysis and examination of larger plant fragments were utilised by archaeologists working on Hadrian's Wall and elsewhere in the North East of England.

=== External interests ===
She was also an active field botanist and a member of a number of natural history societies: the Natural History Society of Northumbria, the Northern Naturalists' Union, the University of Durham Philosophical Society and the Wallis Club (a naturalists' field club). She carried out field work in the Hebrides, as a member of the expeditions made there by her department in the 1930s. She sat on the Hancock Museum's management committee.

== Personal life ==
Blackburn rode a motorcycle in the early days of motoring and later, unusually for the time, drove her own car. She went on botanical expeditions to isolated islands in the Hebrides. She appears never to have married, and seems to have lived in the family home in Jesmond, Newcastle upon Tyne, at least in later years, with her sister, Dorothy.

She was a member of the Armstrong College Staff Dramatic Society and played parts in various plays. She gave talks outside the university, for example at Sunderland and Hexham, and wrote popular articles on botanical topics.

== Retirement and death ==
Blackburn retired in 1957 and died in August 1968 of Parkinson's disease, which had started before she retired.

== Awards ==
Blackburn had been elected a Fellow of the Linnean Society of London (FLS) by 1927. She received their Trail Award and gold medal in 1930 "for outstanding contributions to biological microscopy".

== Selected works ==
- Blackburn, K. B.; Heslop-Harrison, J. W. (1921). "The Status of the British Rose Forms as determined by their Cytological Behaviour". Annals of Botany. 35 (138): 159–188. doi:10.1093/oxfordjournals.aob.a089753.
- Blackburn, K. B. (1923). "Sex chromosomes in plants". Nature. 112 (2819): 687–688. Bibcode:1923Natur.112..687B. doi:10.1038/112687c0. S2CID 4085828.
- Blackburn, K. B.; Heslop-Harrison, J. W. (1924). "A Preliminary Account of the Chromosomes and Chromosome Behaviour in the Salicaceae". Annals of Botany. 38 (150): 361–378. doi:10.1093/oxfordjournals.aob.a089900.
- Blackburn, K. B.; Heslop-Harrison, J. W. (1924). "Genetical and Cytological Studies in Hybrid Roses; Part I: The Origin of a Fertile Hexaploid Form in the Pimpinellifoliae – Villosae crosses". British Journal of Experimental Biology. 1: 557–570. doi:10.1242/jeb.1.4.557.
- Blackburn, K. B. (1924). "The Cytological Aspects of the Determination of Sex in the Dioecious Forms of Lychnis". British Journal of Experimental Botany. 1: 413–430.
- Blackburn, K. B.; Raistrick, A. (1931). "The Late Glacial and Post-glacial Periods in the North Pennines; Part II: Possible Post-glacial Survivals in our Flora". Transactions of the Northern Naturalists Union. 1: 30–36.
- Blackburn, K. B. (1946). "On a Peat from the Island of Barra, Outer Hebrides: Data for the Study of Post-glacial History. X". New Phytologist. 45 (1): 44–49. doi:10.1111/j.1469-8137.1946.tb05045.x.
- Blackburn, K. B. (1952). "The Dating of a Deposit Containing an Elk Skeleton Found at Neasham Near Darlington, County Durham". New Phytologist. 51 (3): 364–377. doi:10.1111/j.1469-8137.1952.tb06145.x.
