= Hunnum =

Roman fort in Northumberland, England

Onnum (Halton Chesters)
- Northumberland, England, UK
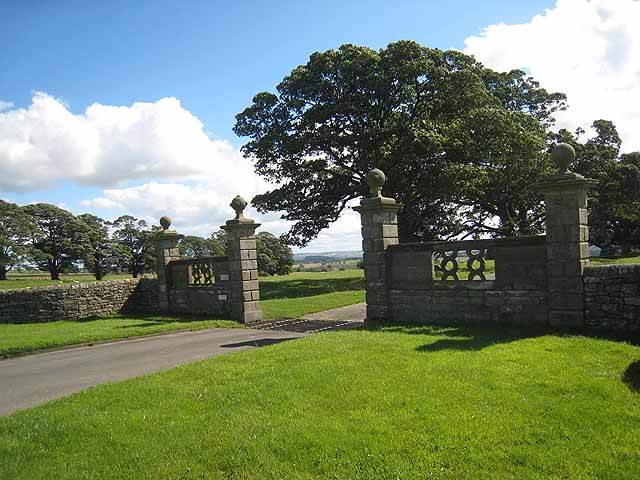
- The gateway to Halton Castle is located near the middle of the former fort

Location
- Location in Northumberland
- Coordinates: 55.010°N 2.006°W
- Grid reference: NY998685

Hunnum (also known as Onnum, and with the modern name of Halton Chesters) was a Roman fort on Hadrian's Wall located north of the modern-day village of Halton, Northumberland in North East England. It was the fifth fort on Hadrian's Wall and is situated about 7.5 miles west of Vindobala fort, 5.9 miles east of Chesters fort and 2.5 miles north of the Stanegate fort of Coria (Corbridge). The site of the fort is bisected by the B6318 Military Road, which runs along the route of the wall at that point.

The fort may also have guarded Dere Street which crosses the Roman Wall through the valley immediately to the west, but its distance from Dere Street and that Milecastle 22 was also displaced from Dere Street implies that this was not a priority and may have been expected to be disused north of the Wall after Hadrian's Wall was built.

The Latinised Brittonic name “Onnum” may mean "Stream/Water", "Ash tree", or “Rock”; if it means "Stream", it may be a reference to the Fence Burn, where a stream touches the line of Hadrian's Wall, but if it means "Rock", it may refer to Down Hill situated to the east of it.

== Description ==
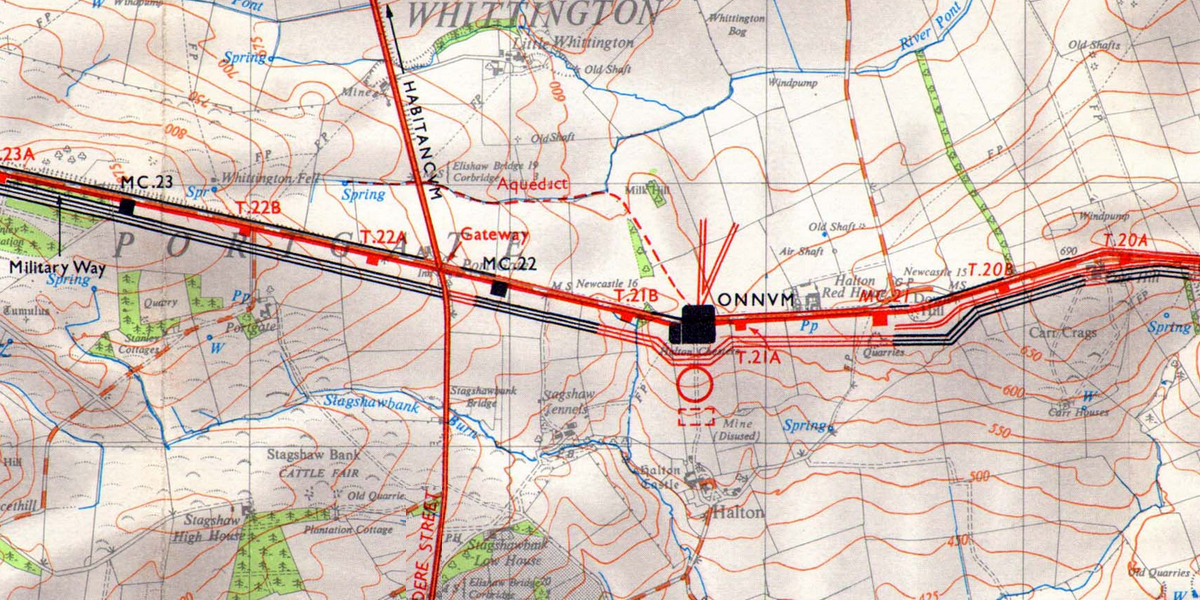
Onnum site with aqueduct, on 1964 OS map

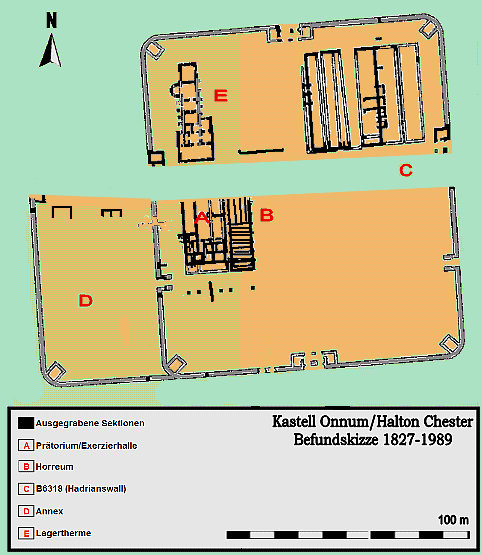
Onnum plan

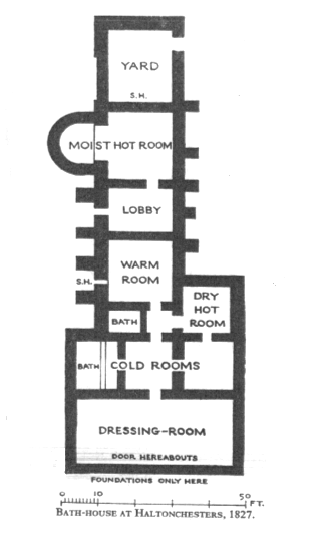
Plan of baths

The original fort was built between 122 and 126 AD with a rectangular plan measuring 460 feet (140 m) north to south by 410 feet (120 m) east to west. It projected partly north of the wall as did other cavalry wall forts to allow rapid access to the north. There were four main gates, at the main points of the compass, with double portals with guard chambers. At various times some of the portals have been blocked up and both portals of the west gate were blocked almost at once. There were towers at each corner of the fort, and also on either side of the main gates.

The Vallum passed some short distance south of the fort, and was crossed by a road leading from the south gate to the vicus just south of the Vallum.

In the Severan period the section south of the Wall was extended to the west making the south wall of the fort 570 feet (170 m) long and giving the fort an L-shaped appearance. The areas occupied by the northern and southern sections are 4.3 and 4.8 acres (19,000 m^{2}) respectively. These alterations were probably due to the replacing of the original part-mounted garrison by Ala I Pannoniorum Sabiniana, the first cavalry regiment on the Wall which would have required more barracks and stables than the original part-mounted garrison, which the south-western extension of the fort would have provided.

The fort was run down from the 270’s to the 370’s when it was abandoned, like Rudchester.

An unusual discovery when the fields were first plowed in 1827 was that the baths were inside the fort in the northern section, and rare inside forts. They are believed to be of the late fourth century. An aqueduct for the fort and baths has been traced north of the fort.

== Garrison ==
A dedicatory slab from the west gate of the fort tells us that the Legio VI Victrix were responsible for the initial building work. The fort was initially garrisoned, probably, by a cohort of 500 partly mounted troops. In the third century it held a regiment of cavalry transferred from Arbeia fort, the Ala I Pannoniorum Sabiniana, also called Ala Sabiniana, and named after Sabinus who first raised it.

== Excavations ==
The field north of the Military Road containing the northern section of the fort was first ploughed in 1827, and a fine bath-house was found. This contained dry and moist hot rooms, a warm room and cold rooms, and a dressing room. Such a large bath-house is a rarity on the Wall.

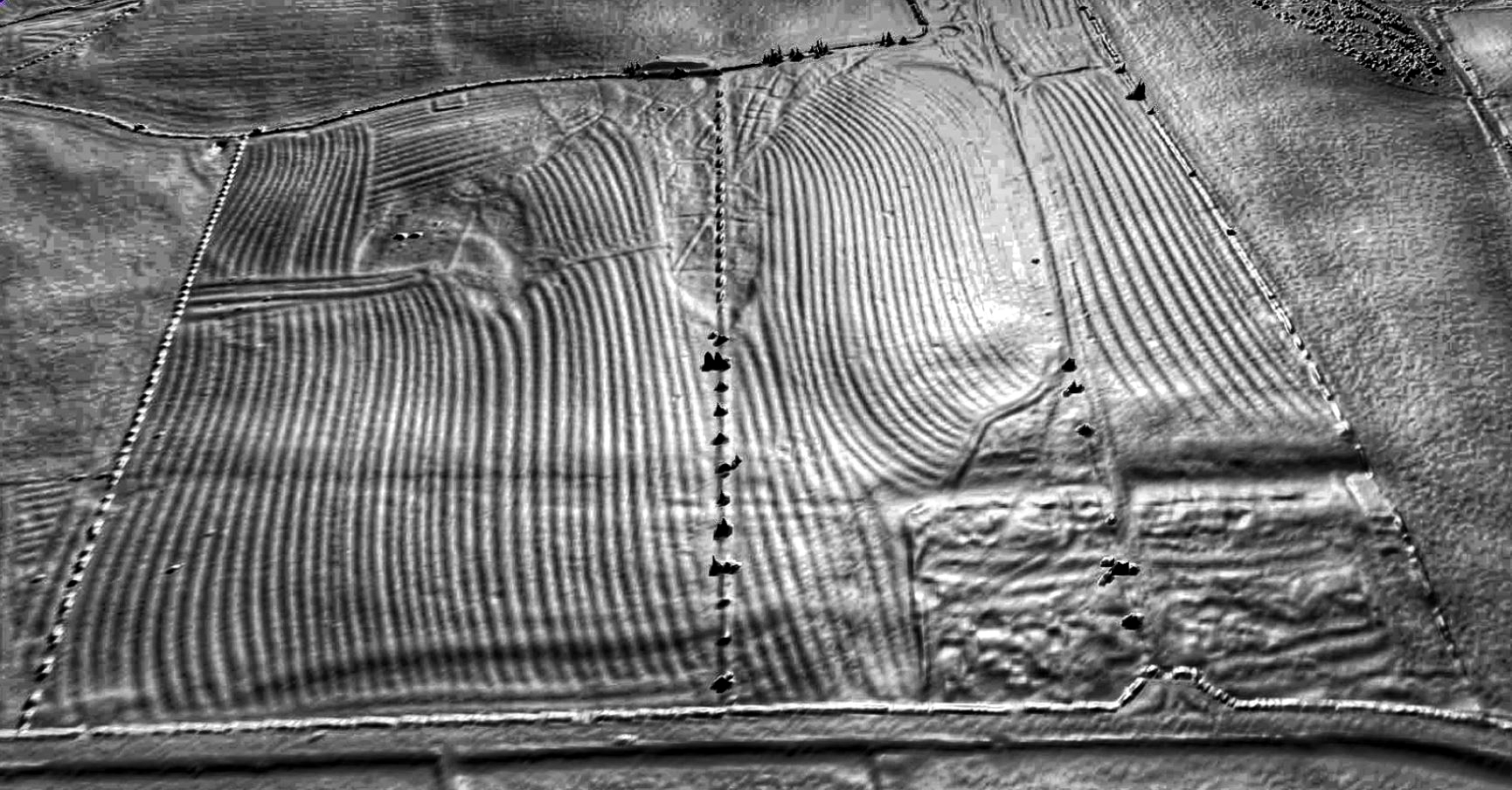
An oblique lidar view of the site of Hunnum Roman fort and the immediate landscape to the south.

== Sources ==
- J. Collingwood Bruce, Roman Wall (1863), Harold Hill & Son, ISBN 0-900463-32-5
- Frank Graham, The Roman Wall, Comprehensive History and Guide (1979), Frank Graham, ISBN 0-85983-140-X
- HUNNUM FORT (ONNUM) Roman-Britain.co.uk
- https://web.archive.org/web/20070915113454/http://hadrians-wall.info/hadrianswall/onnum/onnum.htm
