= Condercum =

Roman fort in England

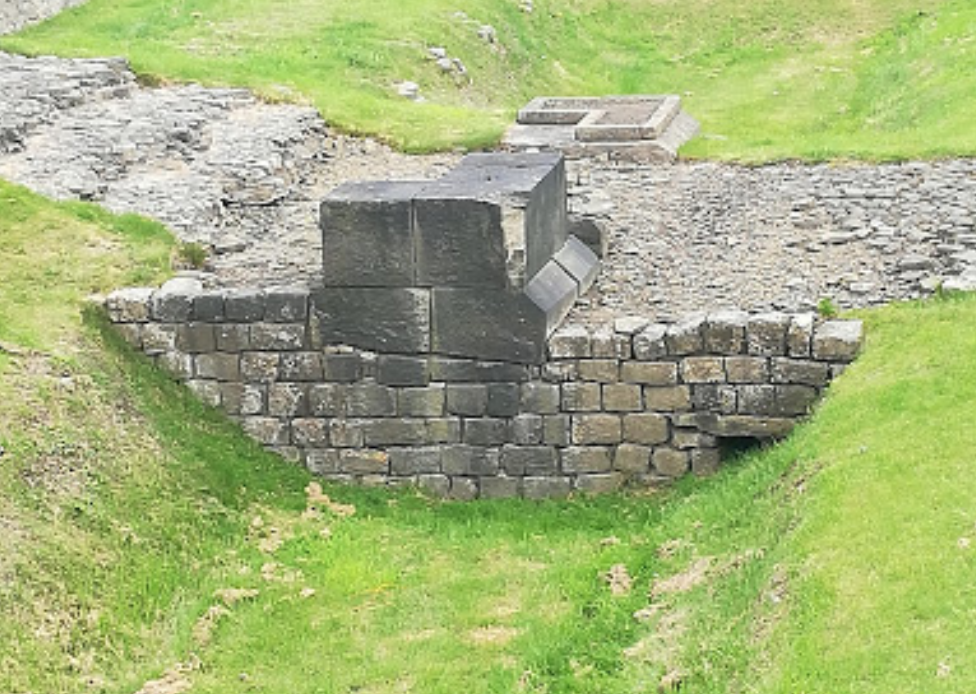
- The Vallum crossing at Condercum

- Location within Tyne and Wear
- 54.976°N 1.663°W
- Location: Newcastle upon Tyne, Tyne and Wear, England

History
- Founded: 122 - 124 AD
- Abandoned: c. 5th century AD

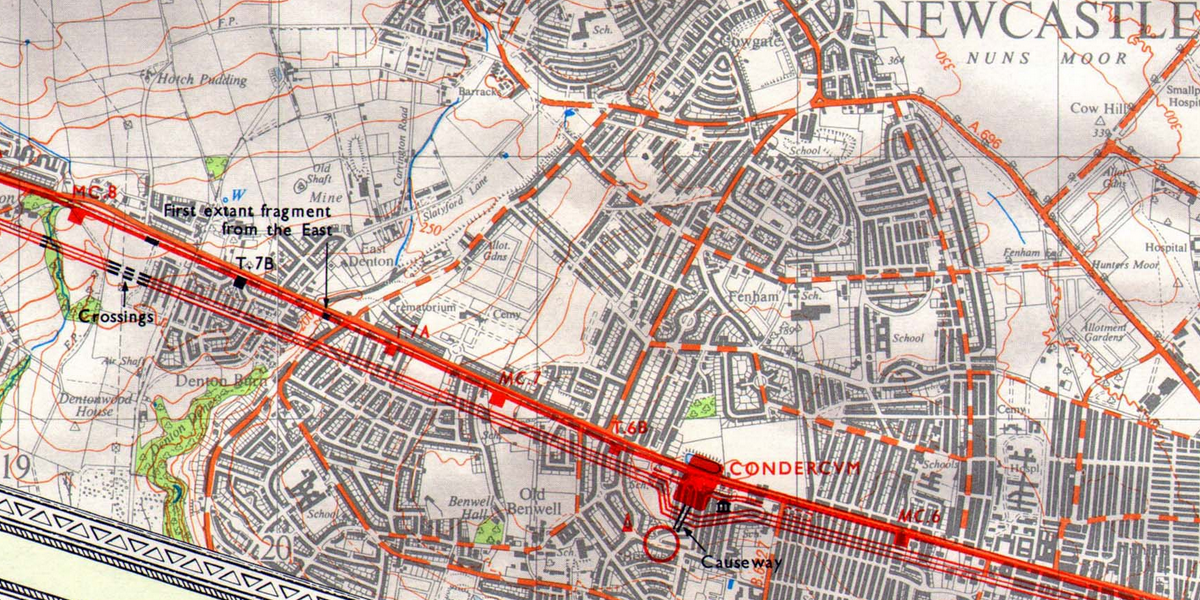
Condercum on 1964 OS map

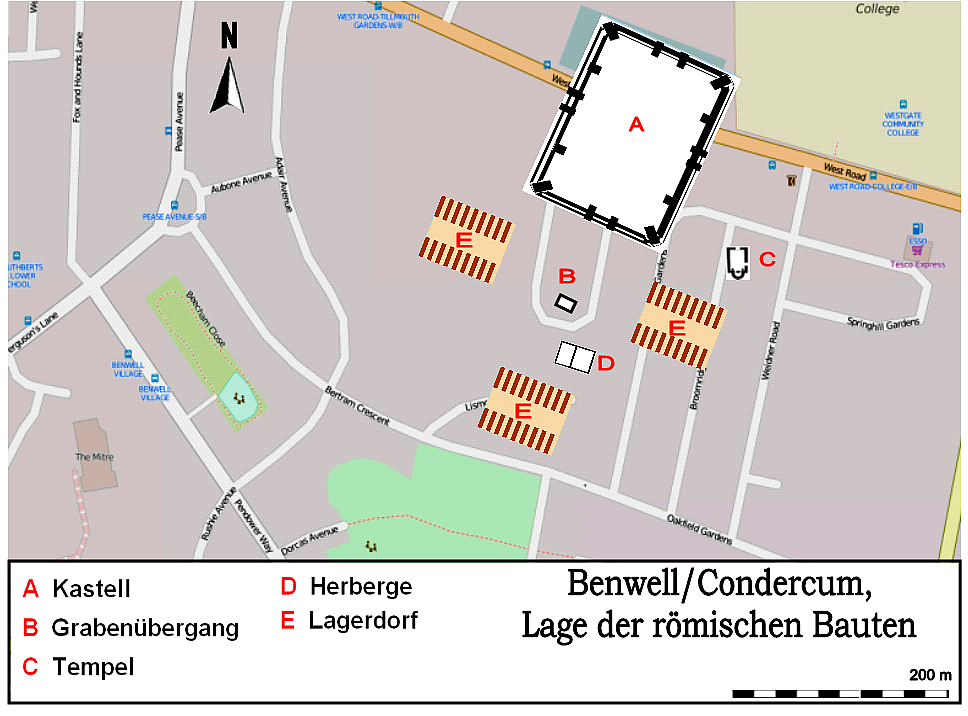
Plan of Condercum fort

Condercum was a Roman fort on the site of the modern-day Condercum Estate in Benwell, a suburb of Newcastle upon Tyne, England. It was the third fort on Hadrian's Wall, about 6.8 miles (10.9 km) east of Rudchester fort and only 2.4 miles (3.9 km) west of Pons Aelius fort (Newcastle), and was situated on a hilltop 2 miles (3 km) to the west of the city.

Today, little can be seen of the fort or its adjoining wall, as the site is covered by a modern reservoir and housing estate, bisected by the A186 Newcastle to Carlisle road, which follows the line of Hadrian's Wall. The remains of a small temple dedicated to Antenociticus, a local deity, can be seen nearby, and the original causeway over the Vallum, or rear ditch.

== Name and etymology ==
The name Condercum is derived from a Common Brittonic term *conderco-, meaning "a viewpoint, a look-out place" (cf. Old Irish condercar).

== History ==
The fort was built between 122 and 124 AD by the Legion Legio II Augusta. The fort had two granaries built by a detachment from the British Fleet, likely from nearby Arbeia fort, probably because the legionaries responsible for construction of the fort had been called away.

The Vallum was built shortly after 130 to the south of the fort to protect the wall from attack from this side, and made a detour around the fort. The vallum could only be crossed at the forts and hence at Benwell a causeway and a gate provided this access about 30 m (100 ft) south of the fort's southern gate.

Additional building or repair work in the late-2nd century was done by Legion Legio XX Valeria Victrix based at Chester.

== Garrison ==
In the 2nd century Condercum was garrisoned by the Cohors I Vangionum Milliaria Equitata, a part-mounted unit from Upper Germany. This had a nominal strength of one thousand men, but it is likely that only half of this number occupied the fort. From 205 to 367 a five-hundred-strong auxiliary cavalry unit (Ala I Hispanorum Asturum) recruited from the Astures tribe in northern Spain, was stationed here after being at South Shields.

== Description ==
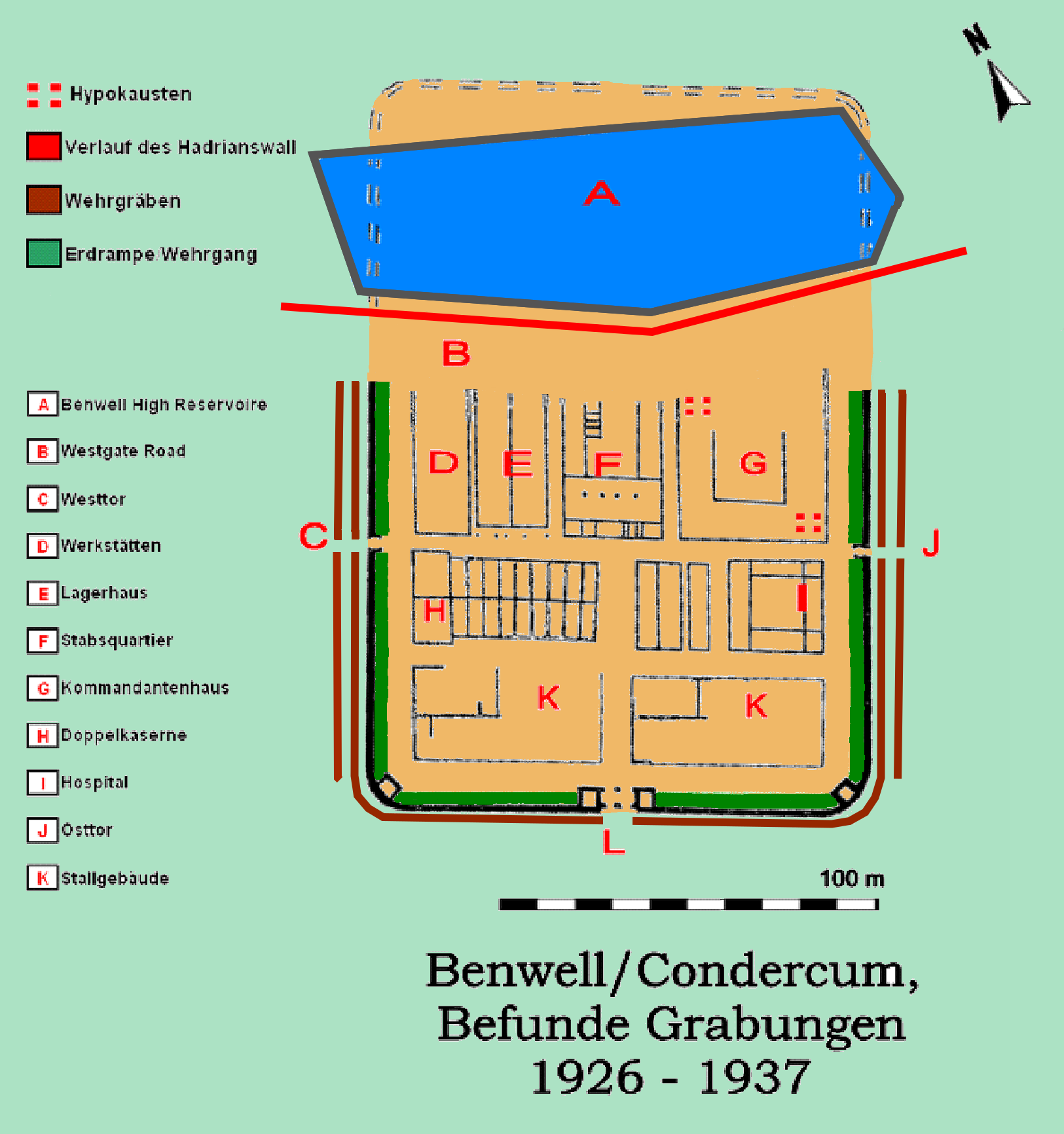
Plan of fort and surrounding buildings

The fort measured 570 feet (170 m) from north to south by 400 feet (120 m) east to west and the defences enclosed an area of just over 5 acres (2.0 ha). As a cavalry fort built partially to the north of the wall, it had three gates on this side to allow quick access. There were two side gates, facing east and west, through which the Roman military road, running along the south side of Wall, passed. There was also a south-facing gate that led to a stone causeway crossing the vallum ditch, 20 ft (6 m) wide and 10 ft (3 m) deep, with mounds either side.

The causeway, still visible today, had a large monumental non-military gateway located halfway across the vallum and with some of the best dressed stone on Hadrian's Wall.

The fort contained a commandant's house, headquarters, two granaries, workshops, barracks, stables and a hospital.

=== Other buildings ===
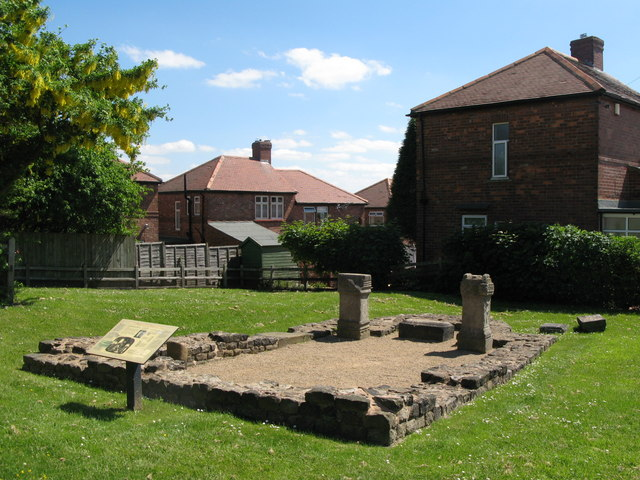
Temple of Antenociticus

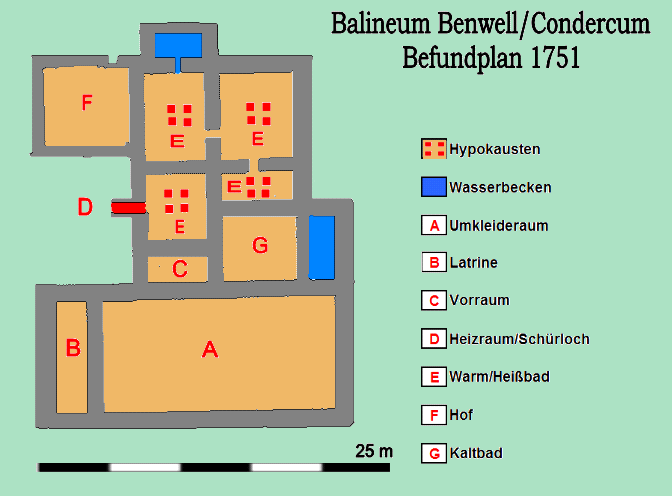
Plan of baths

A vicus, or civilian settlement, grew up around the fort, lying to the north and south of the vallum. The remains of several notable buildings were found near the fort indicating that the vicus was extensive.

The remains of a temple dedicated to Antenociticus can still be seen a hundred yards to the east of the fort. The building, which was discovered in 1862, measures 15 feet (4.6 m) from east to west and 20 feet (6.1 m) from north to south, with an apse extending a further 6 ft (2 m) on the south end. It is believed that the apse contained a life-size statue of the god, as a full size head was found, together with the fragments of an arm and a leg. The head was adorned with a Celtic neck torc. A number of altar-stones were found, three of which were dedicated to Antenociticus, who is believed to be a Celtic deity. Another dedication to the "three lamiae" may likewise refer to local Celtic deities.

Thermal baths were discovered 300 m to the southwest of the fort. The building had several rooms, the hot, cold rooms and dressing rooms normally found in such baths.

Just south of the vallum causeway a large domestic building was found, believed to be a mansio (inn for official travellers).

== Excavations ==
The fort was excavated in the 1920s to 1930s when a dedication table was found that suggested the origin date of 122 AD. Also, pottery was found that dated to the 2nd century indicating the time of the rebuild. Other finds from the site include altars dedicated to the gods, square-head and cruciform brooches, a strong room or treasure vault, and a silver spoon.

In 2017, excavations on a building site in Dorcas Avenue found substantial walls of the vicus.

Excavations in 2020 revealed sections of the fort and vicus foundations in several house gardens.

== Sources ==
- J. Collingwood Bruce, Handbook to the Roman Wall (1863), Harold Hill & Son, ISBN 0-900463-32-5
- Ronald Pemberton and Frank Graham, Hadrian's Wall in the Days of the Romans (1984), Frank Graham, ISBN 0-85983-177-9
- Historic England. "Details from listed building database (1003499)". National Heritage List for England.
