= Caernarfon Mithraeum =

Roman temple ruins near Caernarfon, Wales

Coordinates: 53.137172°N 4.262414°W

The Caernarfon Mithraeum is a Mithraic temple or Mithraeum. It was located 137 metres north-east of the Roman castrum of Segontium on the outskirts of modern Caernarfon in Gwynedd, Wales.

The remains were discovered by accident on 2 April 1958 and excavated by the National Museum of Wales in August of the following year under the direction of George Boon. The site was found to be already damaged by a sewer trench which cut across the anteroom and had removed part of the southeast corner, but the majority of the temple could be excavated. The excavators noted the site was quite marshy and this suggested that a stream had once flowed close to the temple at the bottom of the shallow valley. The marshy conditions caused the mechanical excavator to frequently fall into the excavation, causing further damage.

== Mithraeum Phase I ==
The first phase of the temple (and all subsequent temples on the site) was orientated on an alignment 30 degrees east of north at the foot of the western side of a small shallow valley. The building measured 14.6m by 6.55 and is tentatively dated to the third century AD, a period when the fort was occupied by the Cohors I Sunicorum. The shrine consisted of an anteroom (narthex) at the southern end, followed by the temple proper which consisted of a sunken central nave flanked by low benches. This is typical of Mithraic temples and enabled the temple to be clearly identified despite no sculptural or epigraphic evidence being found. A rectangular alcove stood at the northern end and would have held the tauroctony. Untrimmed beach boulders were used for the walls, which must have given the structure a rustic look. No trace of the bonding mortar for the stones survived. Several fragments of purple Cambrian slate tiles were found belonging to the roof.

The narthex, measuring 1.82m x 5.48m, was almost totally destroyed and no trace of any features survived, including the floor covering. The shrine measured 10.6m x 5.48m with a 2.43m wide niche at the northern end, 45 cm deep. The benches were 1.52m deep and 9.1 meters long. Steps must have led down into the nave, though this part was destroyed by the sewer trench. The bench tops were at ground level, the same level as the narthex. The only dating evidence came from a worn denarius coin of Faustina I (138-9 AD) found on top of one of the benches.

== Mithraeum Phase II ==
For the second phase, timber colonnades were inserted, presumably to help support the weight of the slate roof. The ten timber columns were supported by small stone bases, each base set on a bed of cobbles. The fact that each base is different (including one circular in shape while the rest are all square) suggested to the excavators that they were salvaged from various other buildings. A v-shaped tile-lined drain was cut into the floor and entered the temple through the exterior wall just north of the end of the south bench and ran diagonally across the nave to terminate at the front of the middle of the north bench. A tank must have existed here to collect the trickle of spring water. No dating evidence existed for this phase, however the excavator surmised by the lack of wear on the Phase I floor that Phase II occurred very soon after.

== Mithraeum Phase III ==
The third and final phase of the temple was preceded by the partial collapse of the roof. Broken slates were used to raise the level of the nave, this could have been to help avoid the waterlogging that may have affected the earlier two phases. This layer was sealed by a new cobbled floor throughout the nave. To compensate for the raising of the nave height, the benches and the area in front of the niche were raised. Small flights of two steps were now erected at the front of the benches near the entrance into the nave and steps were provided to lead up to the area in front of the niche. A stone platform 0.9m x 1.52m was built to the right of the niche, possibly to serve as a statue base. The colonnade from Phase II was removed and at least five small pedestals were placed against the bench fronts.

A layer of soil was found, no more than 60 mm thick, between the Phase III floor and the layer of burnt debris that sealed the site. This indicated a period of abandonment prior to the burning of the roof and also explains why no Mithraic sculptures were found in the building, as they had all been removed. This would equate well with the removal of the garrison of Segontium in c290 AD.

== See also ==
- Rudchester Mithraeum at Vindobala on Hadrian's Wall
- London Mithraeum in Londinium

== Bibliography ==
- Boon, G.C. (1960). "A Temple of Mithras at Caernarvon-Segontium". Archaeologia Cambrensis. 109: 136–178.
