= Rudchester Mithraeum =

Roman temple

Coordinates: 55°0′5.53″N 1°49′44.18″W

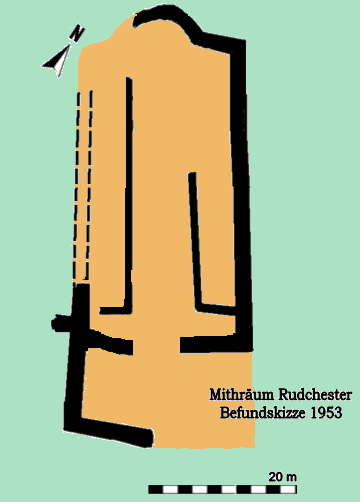
Floor plan of the Roman Mithraeum at Rudchester (as excavated in 1953)

Rudchester Mithraeum is a Roman temple to the Roman god Mithras at Rudchester (Vindobala), an auxiliary fort on Hadrian's Wall, the northern frontier of Roman Britain. The temple (known as a mithraeum) was located 137m to the west of the castra. It is not currently visible to visitors to the site.

== Discovery ==
The site of the shrine was first discovered in 1844 when the local farmer uncovered a statue and five altars in his field. The statue was broken up (and subsequently lost); however, the altars were all saved.

The five altars were:

1. DEO /L SENTIUS / CASTUS / (centurio) LEG VI D(ono) P(osuit).
  "To the god. Lucius Sentius Castus, centurion of the 6th legion gave this."
2. DEO INVICTO / MYTRAE P(ublius) AEL(ius) / TITULLUS PRAE(fectus) / V(otum) S(olvit) L(aetus) L(ibens) M(erito).
  To the invincible god Mithras, Publius Aelius Titullus, prefect, gladly, willingly and deservedly fulfilled his vow.
3. DEO SOLI INVIC(to) / TIB(iberius) CL(audius) DECIMUS / CORNEL(ius) ANTO/NIUS PRAEF(ectus) / TEMPLE(um) RESTIT(uit).
  To the Invincible Sun. Tiberius Claudius Decimus Cornelius Antonius, Prefect, restored the temple.
4. SOLI / APOLLINI / ANICETO / [Mithrae] APON[I]US ROGAT[I]ANUS [PRAEF(ectus) V(otum) S(olvit) L(ibens) M(erito ?]
5. No inscription.

The location of the discovery was marked on contemporaneous maps, enabling the archaeologist J. P. Gillam to relocate the shrine and excavate it in 1953.

== The Mithraeum Phase I ==
Gillam identified two distinct phases of use consisting of two successive temples on the site. He deduced that the first temple was built in the late second or early third century AD. Oriented east to west, the shrine formed a rectangle 12 x 6.02m in size with a small apse in the west end-wall. The plan was typical of mithraic temples in that it consisted of a central nave flanked by low benches. The building was constructed in stone with clay used to bond the blocks. A roughly-built narthex (or ante-chapel) was later added to the outside of the east wall, 3m in depth and 6m in width. It was placed asymmetrically in line with the south wall so that there was no direct view from the front entrance into the temple. Similar to the shrine at Carrawburgh this anteroom contained a low stone bench which may have been used in initiation rites. The east wall, however, was built over a badly filled-in pit and the subsequent subsidence caused the collapse of the structure.

== The Mithraeum Phase II ==
The mithraeum was rebuilt soon after, but without the ante-room. Access was now directly into the shrine from the outside, and it is unusual that the community would not have wanted at least some form of ante-chamber, especially as they also reduced the free space within the shrine by extending the benches. The interior of the shrine was remodelled to include a stone podium in front of the apse (presumably for the tauroctony) and the lengthening of the benches. A new roof system was also put in with wooden posts standing in front of the benches. Five small uninscribed altars were found inside the nave, and the remains of a water-basin were recovered about two-thirds of the way along the northern bench.

Gillam found two heads of the torch-bearers Cautes and Cautopates, and speculated that this was the result of a deliberate decapitation of the statues. The lack of any trace of the tauroctony was also used to argue for a deliberate desecration of the shrine; however, in the absence of any single fragment of it and without knowing what the statue smashed in 1844 was of, it is hard to say for sure. Certainly pottery evidence spread over the temple shows that it was out of use by the mid-fourth century.

All the finds and altars were placed in the Museum of Antiquities at the University of Newcastle upon Tyne, which has since closed. The exhibits have now been transferred to the refurbished Great North Museum: Hancock nearby.

== See also ==
- Caernarfon Mithraeum at Segontium in Roman Wales
- London Mithraeum in Londinium
