= Milecastle 31 =

Milecastle on Hadrian's Wall in Northumberland, England

- Northumberland, England, UK
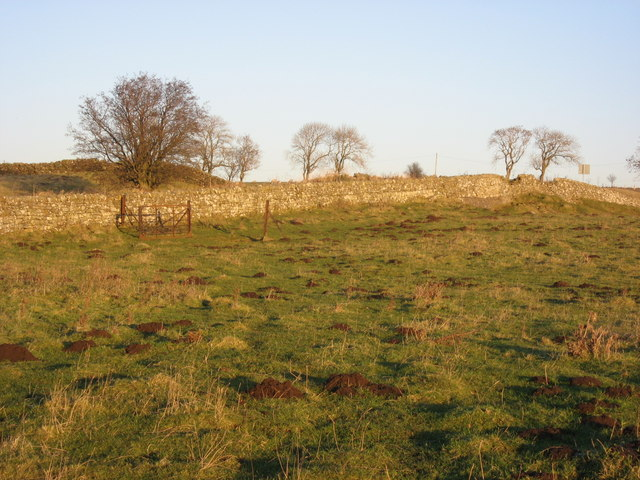
- The site of Milecastle 31

Location
- Location in Northumberland
- Coordinates: 55.034899°N 2.227914°W
- Grid reference: NY85537117

Milecastle 31 (Carrawburgh) was a milecastle of the Roman Hadrian's Wall. Its remains exist as a turf covered platform beside (and partially covered by) the B6318 Military Road, just to the east of Carrawburgh fort (adjoining the car park).

== Place-name etymology ==
Carraw seems to be a Cumbric name cognate with Welsh carrau 'rocks'.

== Construction ==
Nothing is known of the construction of Milecastle 31. Only the west wall has been located.

== Excavations and investigations ==
- Early 19th century – Lingard reports the discovery of bones between the milecastle and Carrawburgh fort.
- 1934 – The milecastle is sought, but only a coin (of Victorinus) is discovered.
- 1964 – Excavations are undertaken in advance of the construction of the car park. The west wall of the milecastle is located (robbed out).
- 1965 – English Heritage Field Investigation. It was noted that the north wall of the Milecastle lies beneath the modern road, and that the majority survives as a turf-covered platform (0.25 metres (0.82 ft) high on the west side.
- 1989 – English Heritage Field Investigation (as part of the Hadrian's Wall Project). The previous findings are reconfirmed.

== Associated turrets ==
Each milecastle on Hadrian's Wall had two associated turret structures. These turrets were positioned approximately one-third and two-thirds of a Roman mile to the west of the Milecastle, and would probably have been manned by part of the milecastle's garrison. The turrets associated with Milecastle 31 are known as Turret 31A and Turret 31B.

=== Turret 31A ===
Turret 31A (The Strands) is buried beneath the B6318 Military Road, and so there are no visible remains. Despite an investigation in 1966 by R.W.Harris of Durham University, the turret remains unlocated at the measured distance from the milecastle.

Predicted location: 55.034972°N 2.227382°W

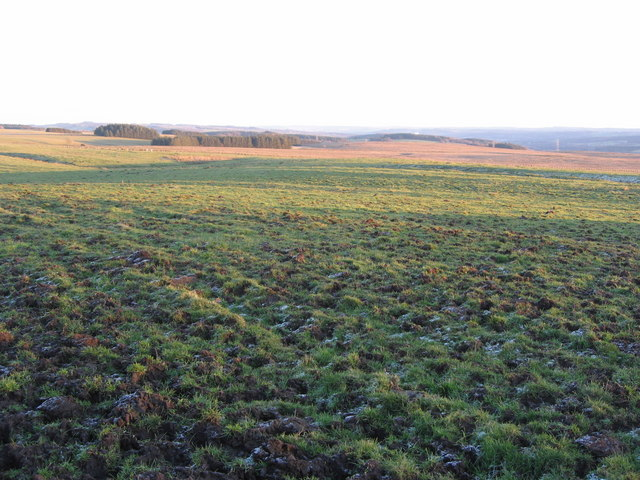
The site of Turret 31B

=== Turret 31B ===
Turret 31B (Carraw East) is located just south of the B6318 Military Road, a few metres east of Carraw farm. It exists as a slight, square, faintly discernable platform. Excavation by R Harris in 1966 revealed that the door was located on the east side of the south wall (a turret plan attributed to XX Valeria Victrix who were based in Deva Victrix (Chester).). The threshold had also been raised, probably in the late 2nd century.

Location on Ordnance Survey 1:25 000 map: 55.034166°N 2.234997°W

== Monument records ==
Monument	Monument Number	English Heritage Archive Number
Milecastle 31	16701	NY 87 SE 9
Turret 31A	16707	NY 87 SE 11
Turret 31B	16710	NY 87 SE 12

== Public access ==
The site of the Milecastle is accessible from the car park at Carrawburgh (Brocolitia) fort.

The site of Turret 31A is beneath the B6318.

Although the site of Turret 31B is on private land, it is visible from (and adjacent to) the B6318.

== Bibliography ==
- Daniels, Charles (1979), "Review: Fact and Theory on Hadrian's Wall", Britannia, 10: 357–364, doi:10.2307/526069, JSTOR 526069
