= Ala I Pannoniorum =

The Ala I Pannoniorum (Ala I Pannoniorum Sabiniana), was a Roman cavalry unit stationed in Arbeia in the 2nd c. AD.

It was later stationed at Chesters on Hadrian's Wall, and then in Gemellae in Roman Numidia in around 225-244. During the third century it was commanded by a former guardsman, Celerinius Augendus, who had been ennobled to the equestrian order and given command of this frontier units, guarding the border facing the Sahara desert.

The unit received the surnam "Sabiniana" from its commander, Caius Nymphidius Sabinus.

== See also ==
- Roman auxiliaries
- List of Roman auxiliary regiments

== Sources ==
- Michael P. Speidel - Riding for Caesar, the Roman Emperors' Horse Guards, page 150
- John E. H. Spaul: Ala I Pannoniorum - One or Many In: Zeitschrift für Papyrologie und Epigraphik. Band 105 (1995), S. 63–73, S. 195–196 (PDF S. 5-6)
