= Arbeia =

Roman fort in Tyne & Wear, England

Arbeia Roman Fort and Museum
- Tyne and Wear, England, UK
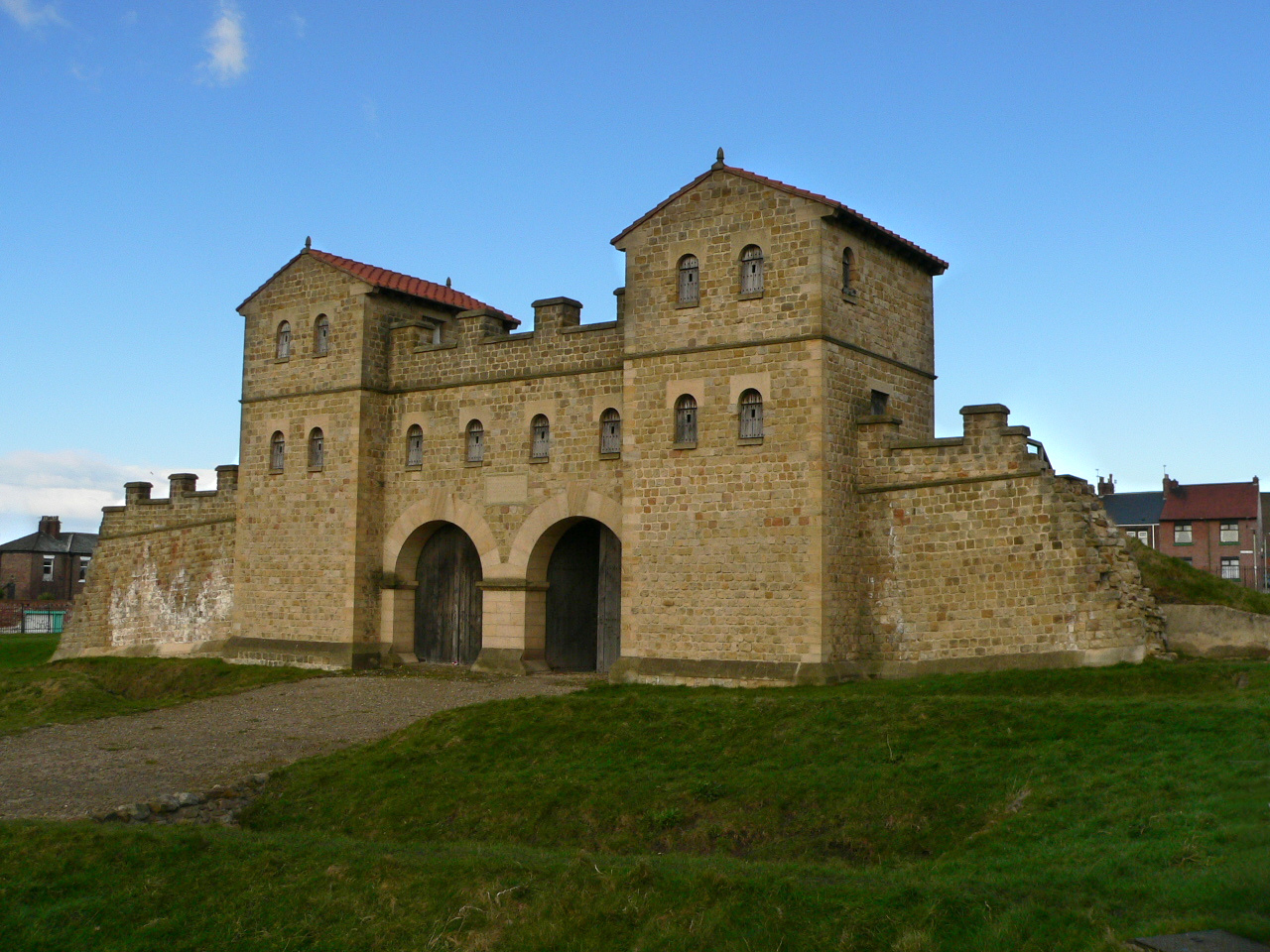
- Reconstructed gateway

Location
- Location in Tyne and Wear
- Coordinates: 55.004°N 1.430°W
- Grid reference: NZ365679

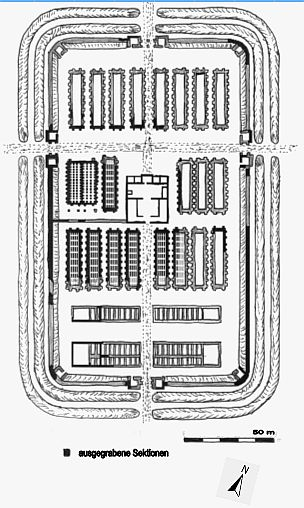
Plan of fort in 210 AD

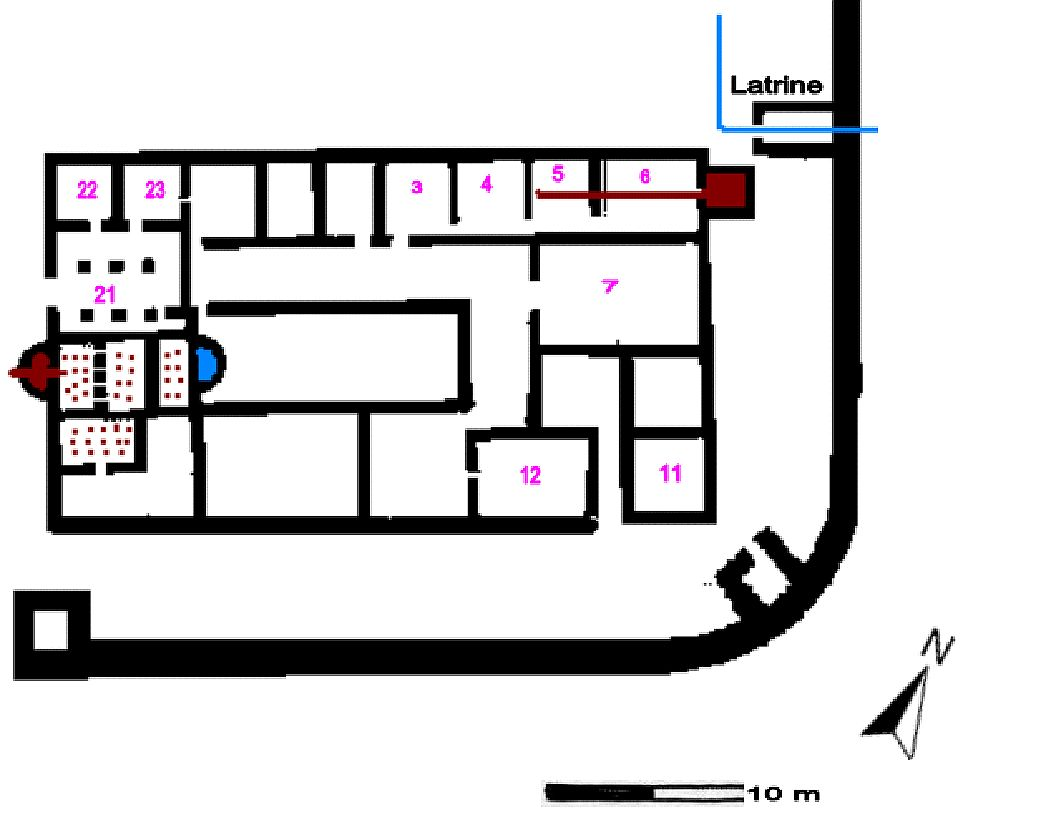
The late Praetorium

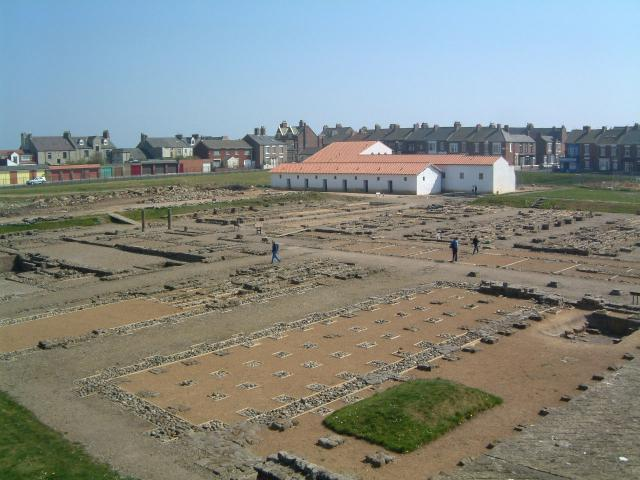
The site

Arbeia was a large Roman fort in South Shields, Tyne & Wear, England, now ruined and partially reconstructed. It was first excavated in the 1870s. All modern buildings on the site were cleared in the 1970s. It is managed by North East Museums as Arbeia, South Shields Roman Fort.

== Name ==
The name Arbeia comes from the Notitia Dignitatum, the only ancient source to feature the name. The entry in Notitia Dignitatum for Arbeia was originally associated with the town of Ireby, Cumbria as early as 1587, but this has since been dismissed as a superficial resemblance. In the early 1900s the name began to be associated with the South Shields site alongside Ireby as well as Moresby, Cumbria.

The name entered widespread use as the probable name for the South Shields fort in 1953, supported by research from Ian Richmond.

Arbeia may mean the "fort of the Arab troops", referring to the fact that part of its garrison at one time was a squadron of Mesopotamian boatmen from the Tigris, following Emperor Septimius Severus securing the city of Singara in 197. However, this is purely speculative and hinges on the similarity of the words 'Arab' and 'Arbeia'.

Alternatively, it could mean "(fort by a) stream noted for wild turnips".

== History ==
The fort was built in 129 AD as a small cohort fort, a few years later than most of the Hadrian's Wall forts, on the Lawe Top overlooking the mouth of the River Tyne and four miles beyond the eastern end of Hadrian’s wall, from where it guarded the flank and main sea supply route to the Wall and the small port on the south of the Tyne.

Its garrison was reduced during the occupation of Scotland in the reign of Antoninus Pius. Early in Marcus Aurelius' reign (161 to 180) it was reoccupied and from 198 it was considerably altered in plan and usage. A dividing wall between the northern and southern halves of the fort allowed the north part to store supplies from sea-going ships, whilst the southern part remained a garrison. The modifications are associated with Septimius Severus' Roman invasion of Caledonia (208–211), a series of campaigns against the troublesome Caledonian tribes, in which the fort may have served as his headquarters.

From 220-235 a new principia (headquarters) and new barracks were built in the southern part of the fort, probably to house the new garrison of Cohors V Gallorum of double size (nominally 1000 men) while the original principia were converted to a granary and nine more granaries were built in the southern part of the fort, bringing the total to 24. Most forts had two granaries but Arbeia had up to 24, indicating that it supplied more than its own troops. It shows that Arbeia became the main supply base for the whole of Hadrian’s Wall rather than obtaining its supplies from the local region by purchase, taxation or requisition, which was the usual assumption.

In the later 3rd century occupants of the vicus appear to have moved into the empty fort.

After a fire in about 300, eight of the granaries were converted to barracks, the principia was enlarged and a new large praetorium (commanding officer’s house) built. The fort was finally abandoned around 400.

It is said to be the birthplace of the Northumbrian King Oswin.

When the fort was unexpectedly discovered in 1875 by an unknown amateur it made national news, since the numerous finds near the centre of a Northern industrial town were of a quality that shocked archaeologists, who found it hard to believe such a site could yield these treasures. The Roman remains attracted crowds that flocked to the town and, despite some believing that they were forgeries, further excavations proved that it was a sensational archaeological discovery.

== Garrison ==
The Ala Primae Pannoniorum Sabiniana was the first garrison, a nominally 500-strong cavalry regiment from the Pannonian tribes of modern Hungary. When they were transferred to Onnum later in the 2nd century, another cavalry regiment replaced them, the Ala I Hispanorum Asturum from the Astures tribe of north-western Spain. After it moved to Benwell, they were replaced before 222 by the Cohors V Gallorum, a nominally one-thousand strong infantry regiment possibly from Fort Cramond on the Forth.

The final garrison was the Numerus Barcariorum Tigrisiensium who were transferred from Lancaster Roman Fort and originally barge-men from the River Tigris in the Middle-East recorded in the Notitia Dignitatum.

== Praetorium ==
The later commanding officer’s house built after 300 resembled elegant 3rd and 4th century houses from the Mediterranean area and included an atrium at the entrance leading to a colonnaded courtyard with a fountain around which most of the rooms were organised. Many of the rooms were decorated with frescoes. A private thermal bath suite included hypocausts for the heated rooms.

== Museum ==
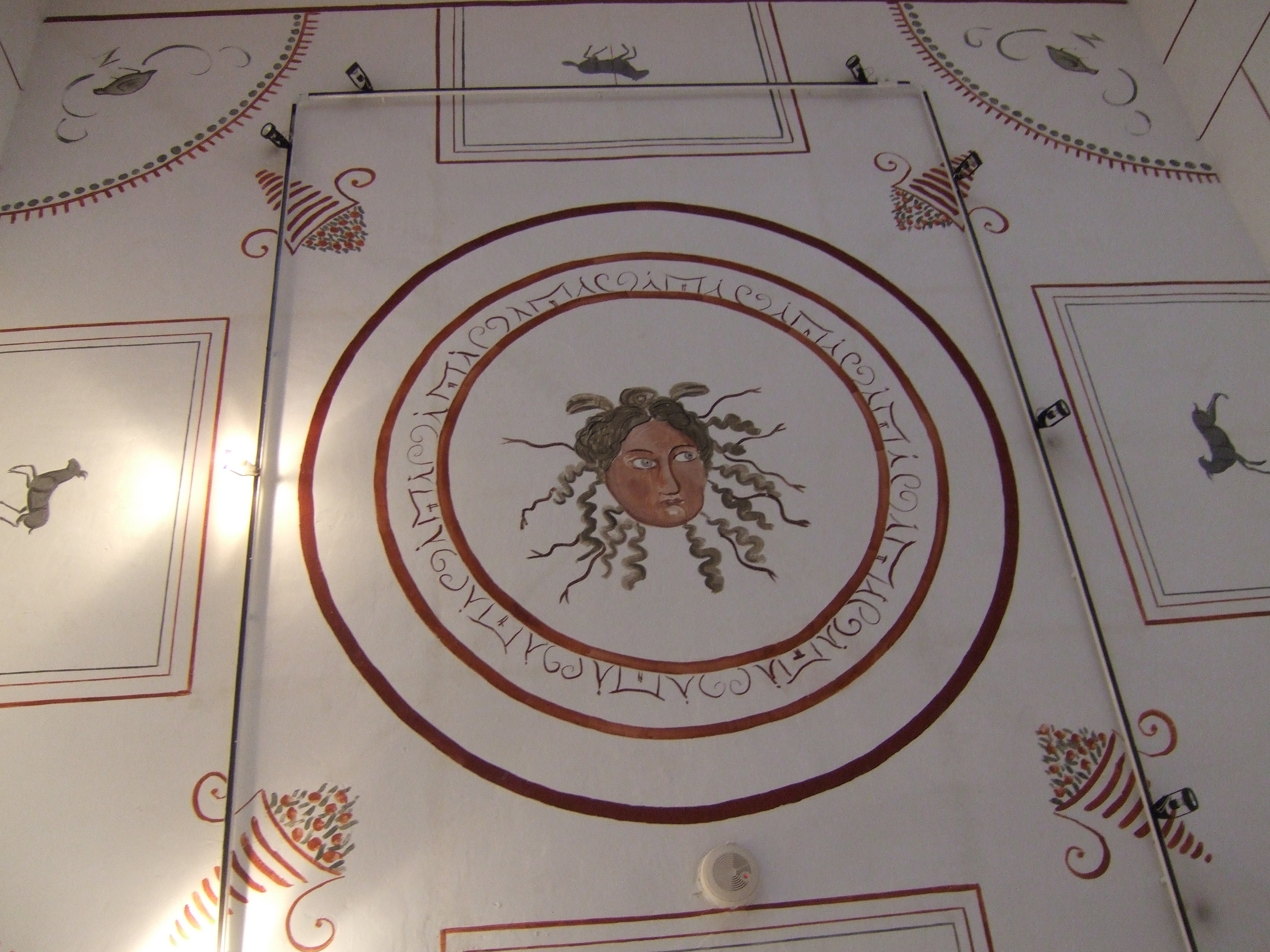
Recreated wall painting from the Praetorium

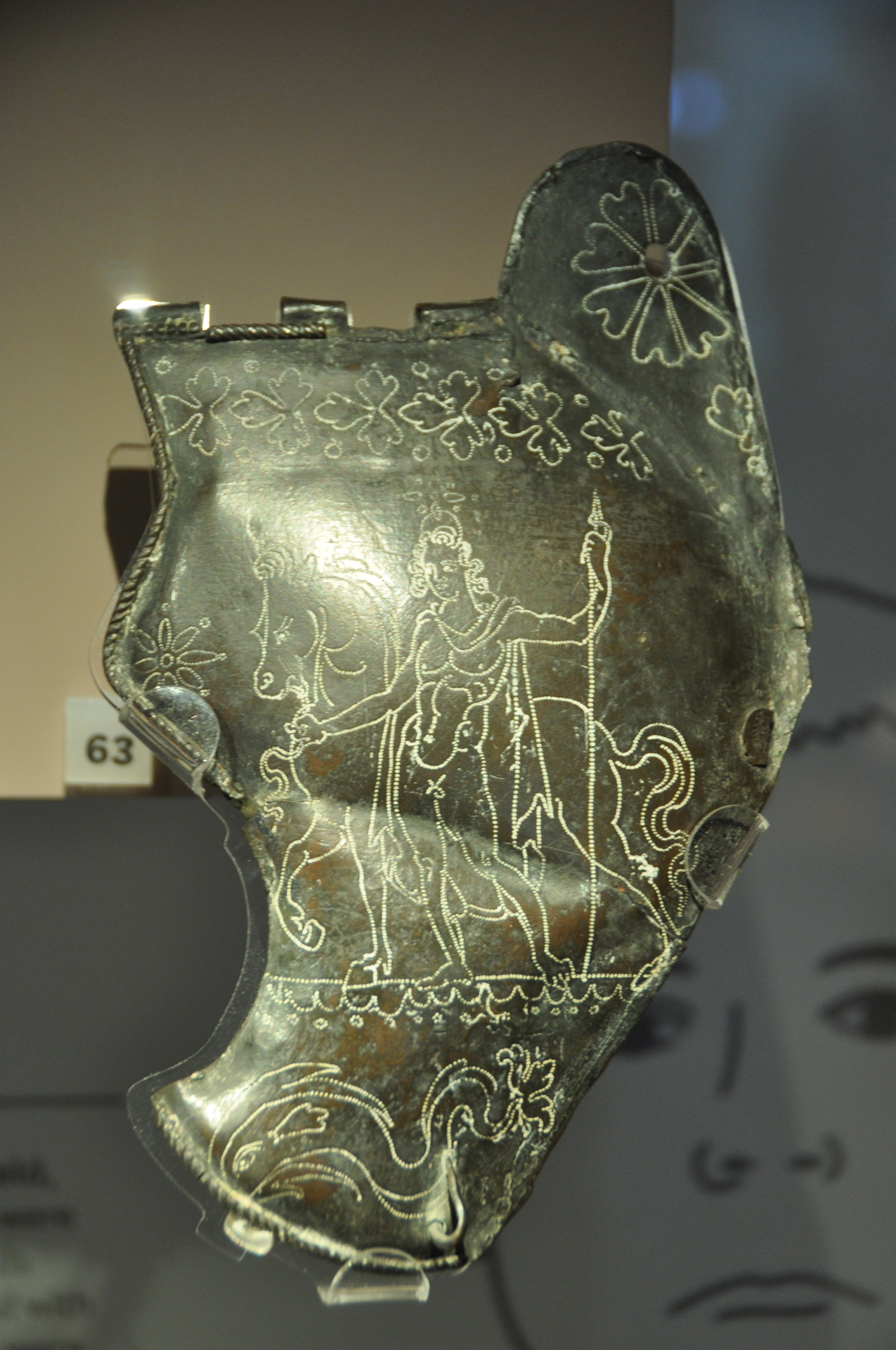
Bronze helmet cheek from the Tyne at South Shields (Newcastle museum) depicting the Dioscuri

Two monuments in the museum at Arbeia testify to the cosmopolitan nature of its shifting population. One commemorates Regina, a British woman of the Catuvellauni tribe (approximately modern Hertfordshire). She was first the slave, then the freedwoman and wife, of Barates, an Arab merchant from thy Praetorium(now part of Syria) who, evidently missing her greatly, set up a gravestone after she died at the age of 30 in the second half of the second century. (Barates himself is buried at the nearby fort at Corbridge in Northumberland.) The second commemorates Victor, another former slave, freed by Numerianus of the Ala I Asturum, who also arranged his funeral ("piantissime": with all devotion) when Victor died at the age of 20. The stone records that Victor was "of the Moorish nation".

The museum also contains an altarpiece to a previously unknown god and a tablet with the name of the Emperor Severus Alexander (died 235) chiselled off, an example of damnatio memoriae.

== Reconstruction ==
The West Gate of the fort was reconstructed in 1986 to give an impression of the place. The reconstruction of the fort was accomplished using research undertaken following excavations, standing where it had originally existed during the Roman occupation of Britain.

A Roman gatehouse, barracks and Commanding Officer's house have been reconstructed on their original foundations. The gatehouse holds many displays related to the history of the fort, and its upper levels provide an overview of the archaeological site.
