= Limestone Corner =

Area associated with Hadrian's Wall

- Northumberland, England, UK
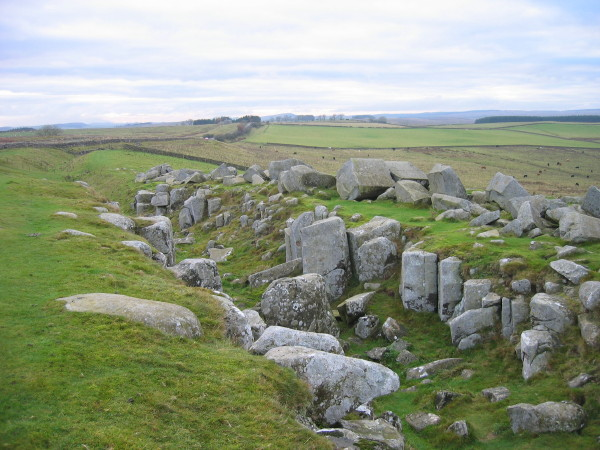
- The wall ditch at Limestone Corner

Location
- Location in Northumberland
- Coordinates: 55.038722°N 2.194560°W
- Grid reference: NY87667159

Limestone Corner is an area of Hadrian's Wall (and associated defences) at its most northerly point, in present-day northern England. It represents the most northerly point of the Roman Empire, outside the two periods during which the Antonine Wall was occupied by the Roman military. Other notable features at Limestone Corner are the wall ditch at this point, which was never completely excavated, a Roman camp and the site of Milecastle 30. Also present is a trig point. The B6318 Military Road also runs through Limestone Corner, as does the Military Way, serving Milecastle 30. The Military Way is visible on the ground at this point, the most eastern point where this is the case.

The name "Limestone Corner" is accepted through extensive usage. It has no geographical status or appear on any official maps; the hill on which it stands is known as Teppermoor Hill.

== Geology ==
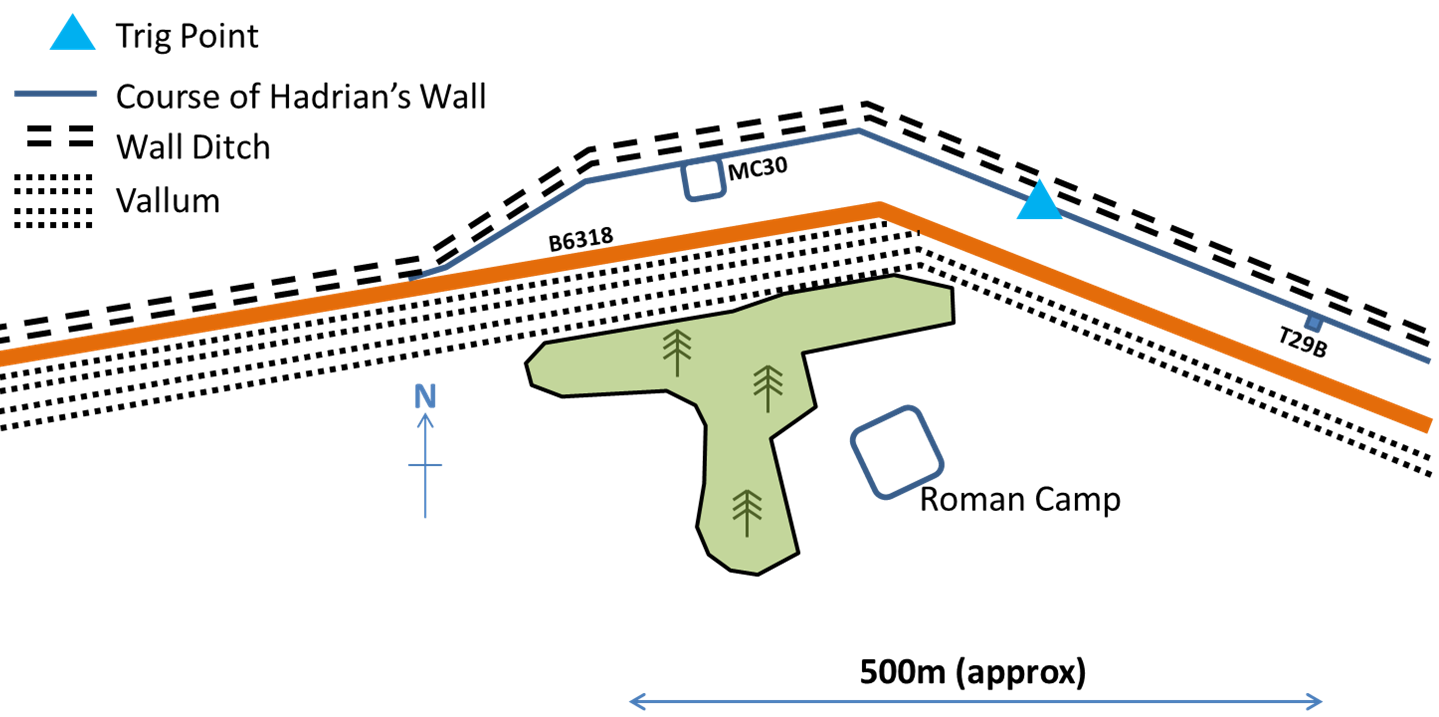
The layout of structures at Limestone Corner

Despite the name, the rock in the area is not actually limestone; it is volcanic quartz-dolerite whinstone. Teppermoor Hill, on which Limestone Corner stands, is the eastern outlier of the Whin Sill.

Moving west along the escarpment, a glacial surface drift of boulder clay begins to overlay the whinstone. To the east, the whinstone lies just below the current turf line approximately as far as Turret 29A.

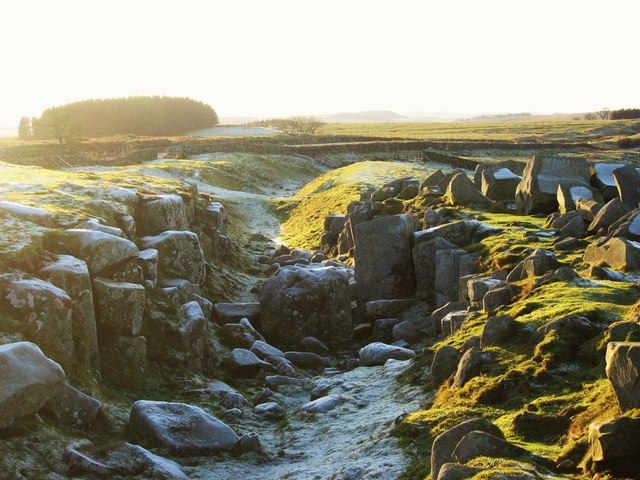
Excavated stones left in and around the wall ditch

== Wall ditch ==
The wall ditch at this point was not completed when first cut. At a point due north of the trig point, only a small amount of topsoil has been removed. A short distance west of this point, significant whinstone blocks remain in the ditch, with others deposited on its northern lip. One large rock provides clues to the methods used by the Legionary engineers to cut the rock. Holes have been drilled (or cut) into a vein of quartz on the rock's upper surface. Wedges were then hammered into the holes to allow the rocks to cleave along the weakness provided by the quartz vein. Two iron wedges were discovered within the wall core at Milecastle 26, consisting of steel-faced tips, and soft heads for hammering. It has also been suggested that wooden wedges were used. After driving the wedges into the hole, water was poured onto the wedges, causing expansion.

No conclusive reason has emerged as to the incomplete nature of the wall ditch at this point. It is possible that the rock became too hard at this point, though the vallum was cut (presumably at a later date) through the same stone.

The unfinished section has provided evidence that this section of the ditch was completed from west to east, whereas other exposures have shown work commencing in the other direction.

== Vallum ==
The vallum at this point is relatively complete. The vallum ditch has been successfully cut through the same rock (for a distance of about 1 mile (1.6 km)) as that through which the wall ditch passes. Secondary crossings are apparent at 41 metres (45 yd) intervals, though many are incomplete. The marginal mound is apparent in this area, containing large quantities of whinstone, as do both mounds. There are occasional large whinstone rocks present on the north and south berms, having been cut from the vallum ditch and deposited whole.

== Milecastle 30 ==
Limestone Corner marks the site of Milecastle 30.

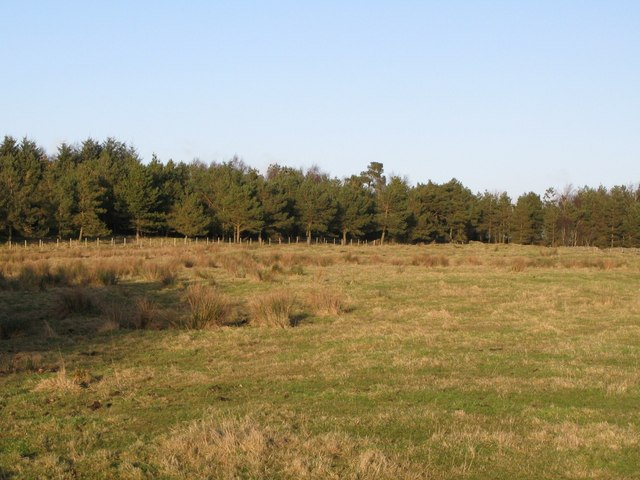
Site of Roman camp

== Roman camp ==
The remains of a Roman camp (itself also referred to as Limestone Corner) are located at the highest point of the hill on which Limestone Corner is situated. This is 150 metres (160 yd) due south of the bend on the B6318 Military Road. It is almost square, measuring around 50 metres (160 ft) on each side, and enclosing an area of around 0.2 hectares (0.49 acres). Although a farmstead (now consisting only of a series of banks) was later built within the camp, the rampart, ditch, all four gateways (one in the middle of each side) and traverses remain visible.

The foundations of several interior buildings are present, which may point to the camp being occupied for more than a single campaign season.

The camp was excavated in 1912. Pottery dating to the second century was found, along with pottery dating to the late third or early fourth century.

Location: 55.038321°N 2.192696°W

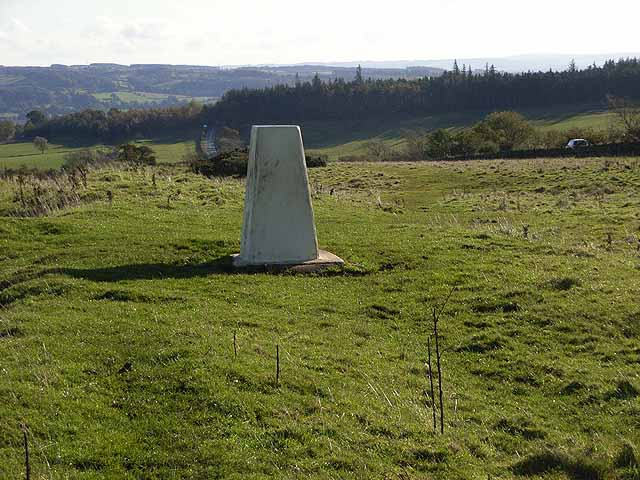
Limestone Bank trig pillar

== Trig point ==
The trig point at Limestone Corner is of the Pillar type. It has identification number TP4416, and is known as Limestone Bank. Limestone Bank trig pillar was one of the 2173 triangulation pillars that constituted what was known as the Secondary Network. These pillars filled in gaps between the Primary Stations, erected during the Retriangulation of Great Britain. It is no longer in use.

The associated Flush Bracket has identification number S6659. Flush brackets were fixed to walls at 1 mile (1.6 km) intervals between Fundamental Benchmarks, and also on trig pillars. They consist of a metal plate with a unique number. There is a horizontal mark with three vertical marks pointing towards it from below (the same mark as was carved into walls for lower order benchmarks).

Location: 55.038321°N 2.192696°W

== Public access ==
Access to Hadrian's Wall, the wall ditch, and the trig pillar is only via the Hadrian's Wall Path. There is no access from the B6318 Military Road. The nearest parking is at Brocolitia Roman fort (also known as Carrawburgh) 1.5 kilometres (0.93 mi) to the west, from where the Hadrian's Wall Path can be accessed.

The vallum and Roman camp are on private land, as is Milecastle 30, though it is possible to view the site of the milecastle from the Hadrian's Wall Path.
