= Vindobala =

Roman fort at Northumberland, England

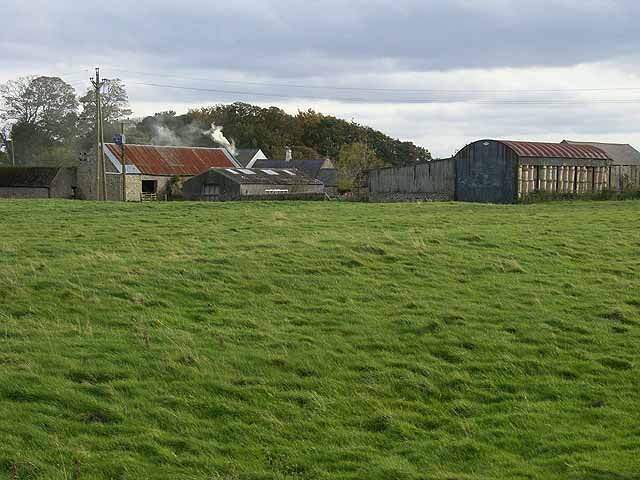
- Site of Vindobala at Rudchester Farm

- Location within Northumberland
- 55.0024°N 1.8255°W
- Location: Rudchester, Northumberland

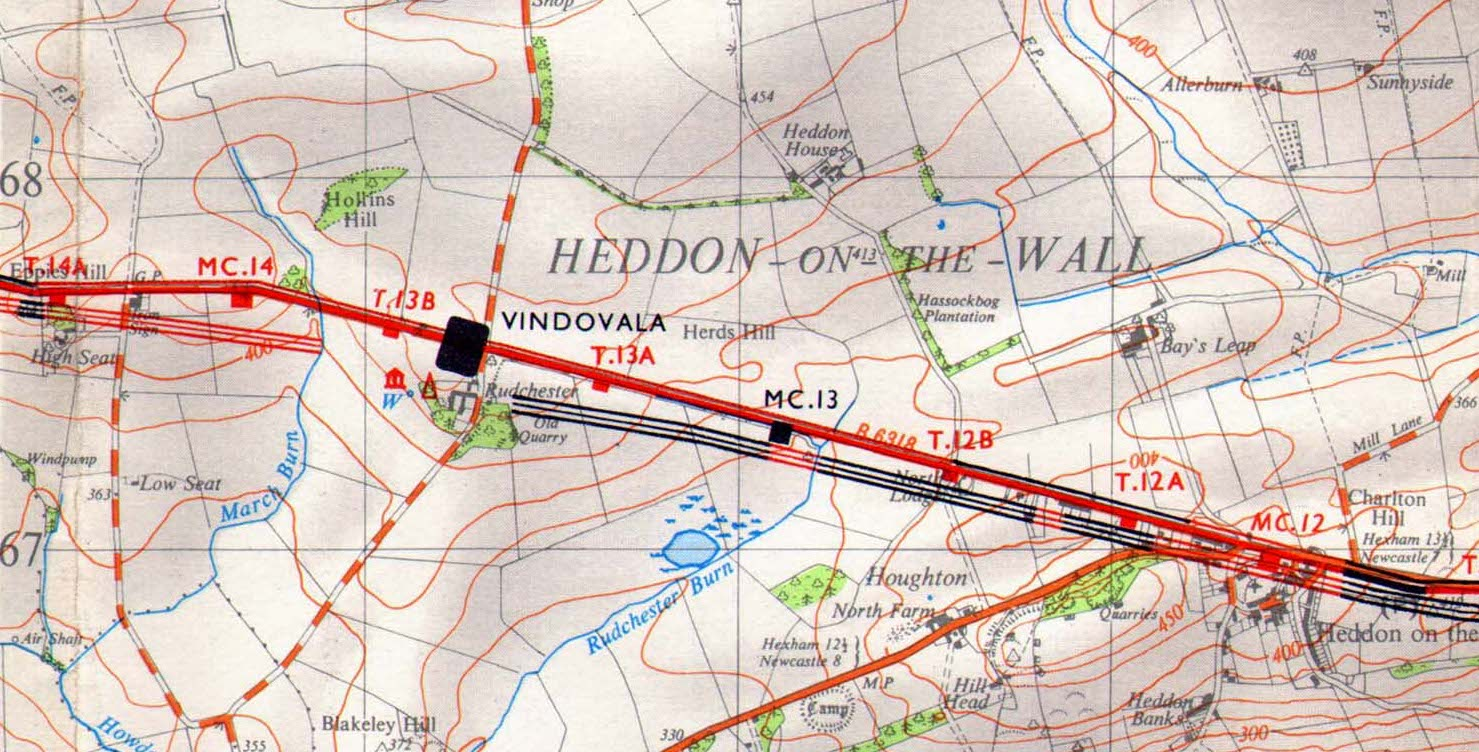
Vindobala from 1964 OS map

Vindobala (Brytonnic Celtic : windo- fair, white, bala place, situation?, cf. Old Irish bal, bail place, situation, condition, good luck) was a Roman fort with the modern name, and in the hamlet of, Rudchester, Northumberland. It was the fourth fort on Hadrian's Wall, and situated about 11 kilometres (6.8 mi) to the west of Condercum (Benwell) fort and 7.5 miles east of Halton Chesters fort. The site of the fort is bisected by the B6318 Military Road, which runs along the route of the wall at that point.

== Description ==
The fort guards the valley of the March Burn to the west, an ancient route leading to the south towards the Tyne ford at Newburn. To the east the ground drops away to the Rudchester Burn. The fort is oblong, measuring 157 metres (515 ft) north to south by 117 metres (384 ft) east to west, and covers about 4.5 acres (1.8 ha). It projected partially north of the wall, typical of a cavalry fort, to allow quick access to the north. There were four main gates with double portals and two smaller, single-portal gates. There was one main gate on the north wall of the fort, and the east and west main gates opened on the north side of the Roman Wall. This left a single main gate on the south wall of the fort, and two smaller gates which probably gave access to a military way running along the south side of the Wall. There were towers at each corner of the fort, and also on either side of the main gates.

It was destroyed by fire and rebuilt on the same plan in the late 2nd/early 3rd century. It became disused by the last quarter of the 3rd century but was re-commissioned c. 370 AD when timber-framed buildings set on stone foundations were erected and occupied till the end of Roman rule.

The Vallum passed about 220 metres (720 ft) south of the fort, and there was a vicus south and south west of the fort. South of the fort, on the brow of a hill, is a cistern, twelve feet long, four and a half feet broad and two feet deep. It was popularly known as the “Giant’s Grave”.

Now there is little to be seen on the surface, apart from mounds to the south of the Military Road marking the west and south ramparts. During the eighteenth and nineteenth centuries stones were systematically removed from the site for local agricultural buildings, and also for the building of the Military Road.

== Garrison ==
It is thought that the fort was built for a cohort, 500 strong and part-mounted.

The fort was garrisoned in the later fourth century by the First Cohort of Frisiavones according to the Notitia Dignitatum. These were troops recruited from a coastal tribe of Lower Germany.

== Excavations ==
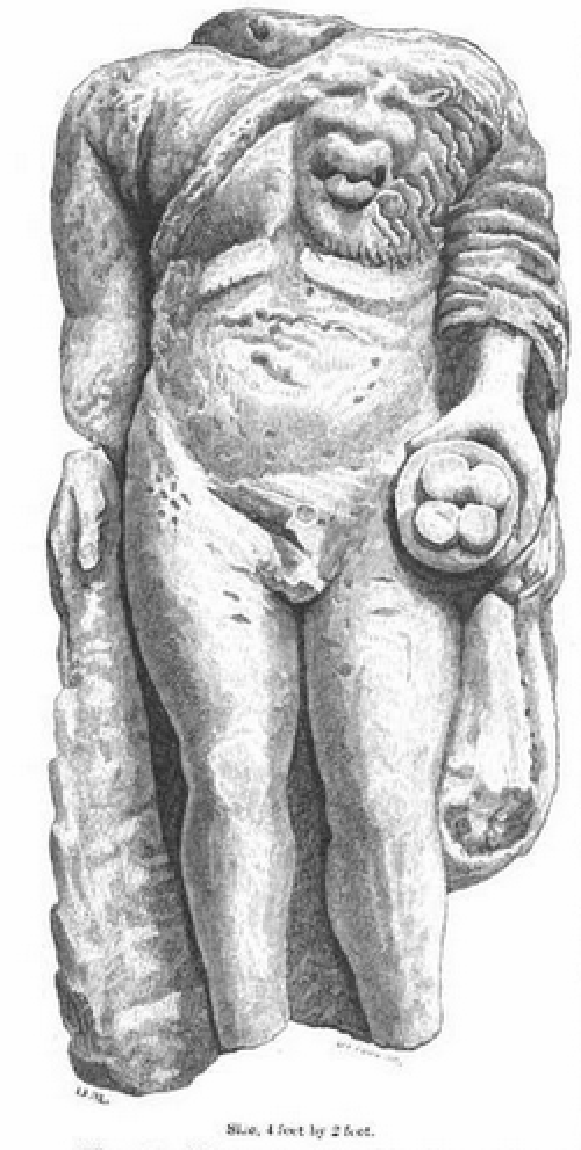
Life-size statue of Hercules found at Vindobala. He is carrying the Golden Apples of the Hesperides in his left hand.

In 1760 a life-size statue of Hercules was found at the site, which is now in the Great North Museum in nearby Newcastle upon Tyne. Excavations of the site were carried out in 1924 and 1962. Two of the main gateways were excavated, as well as a large granary and part of the headquarters. In addition, a hypocaust belonging to the commandant's house was discovered.

=== Mithraeum ===
In 1844, five altars, dedicated to Mithras, were discovered near the site, now known as the Rudchester Mithraeum. It is believed that these come from a temple to Mithras, situated to the south east of the fort. It appears that this was built in the third century and was deliberately destroyed in the fourth century. The building was 43 feet (13 m) long and 22 feet (6.7 m) wide with a narthex, or vestibule, attached to the front.

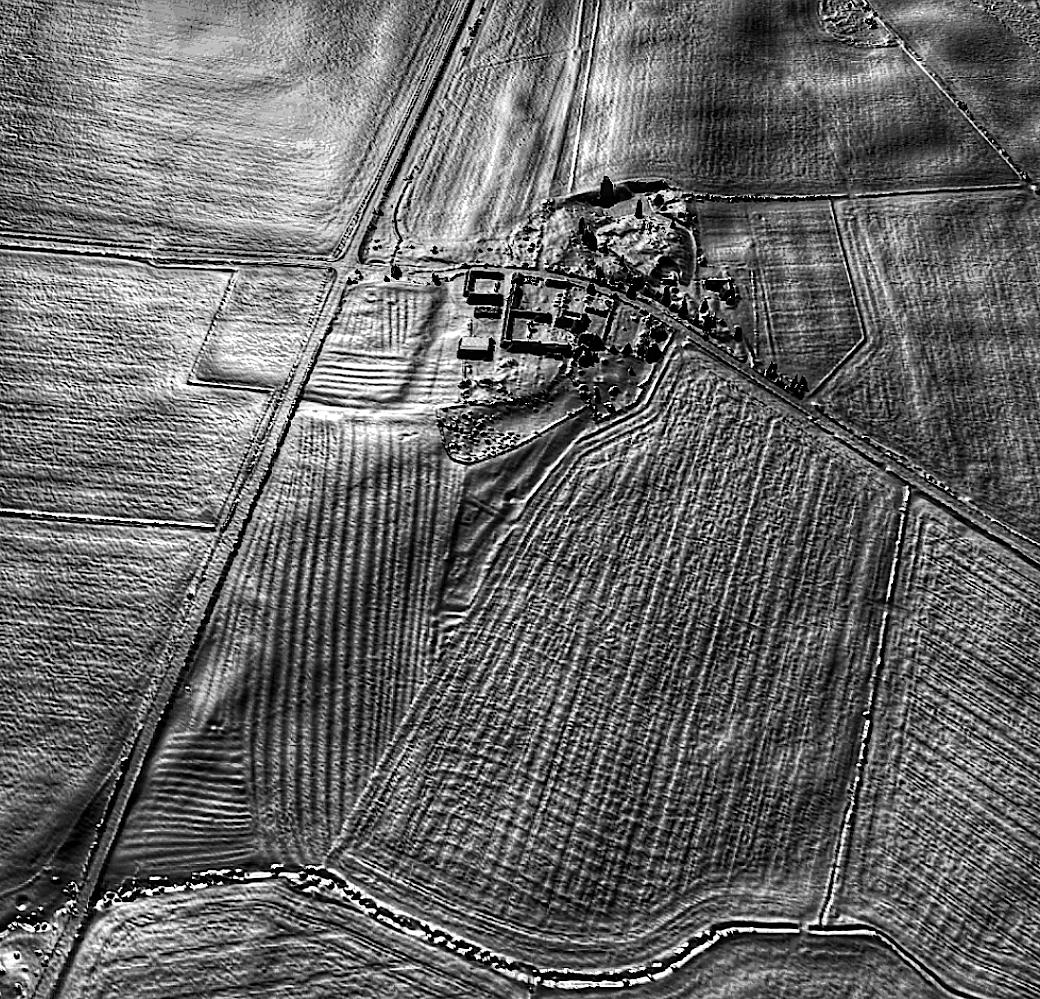
A lidar view of the fort.

=== Curtain wall ===
In 1924, an excavation took place on the wall line 1924 at a point 3 metres (9.8 ft) west of the fort. The north face was erected on a foundation course of coarse white stones. The first course was topped by an elaborately moulded plinth (unknown elsewhere). It has been speculated that this was the location of a special inscription stone marking work on the wall, which has not survived.

== Sources ==
- Vindobala http://rudchester.org/fort.html
- J. Collingwood Bruce, Roman Wall (1863), Harold Hill & Son, ISBN 0-900463-32-5
- Frank Graham, The Roman Wall, Comprehensive History and Guide (1979), Frank Graham, ISBN 0-85983-140-X
- http://www.roman-britain.co.uk/places/vindobala/
- http://www.hadrians-wall.info/hadrianswall/vindobala/vindobala.htm
