= Antenociticus =

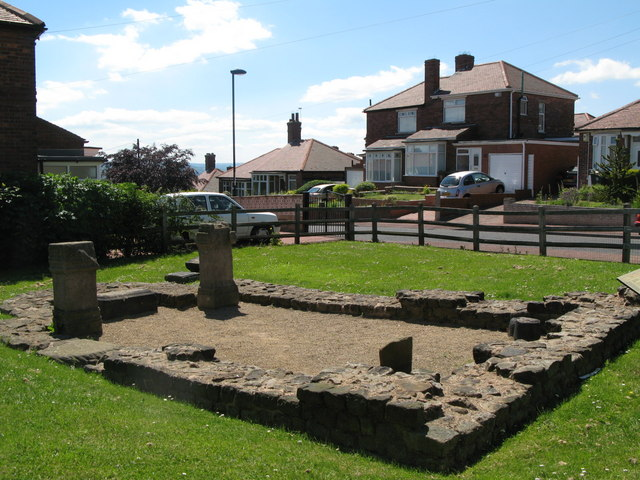
Temple of Antenociticus

In Romano-British worship, the local god Antenociticus, also recorded as "Anociticus" at the same temple site in Benwell, was possibly worshipped as source of inspiration and intercession in military affairs.

== Centres of worship ==
=== Condercum ===
Antenociticus appears at only one site in Britain, the fort of Condercum, on Hadrian's Wall, where three altars to the god were found within the ruins of a small temple. This god is not mentioned on any known Roman altar stones from the continent, and is therefore thought to be a native British deity. The fact that the god is revered at Benwell (1327 [et Num Aug], 1328, 1329 [c.AD175-7]) by a legionary legate, the tribune of an auxiliary infantry cohort and the prefect of an auxiliary cavalry ala, lends credence to this assumption, and perhaps proves that the god was not transferred here as the patron deity of an auxiliary regiment.

The sandstone head of the statue of Antenociticus was discovered in 1862 at the temple in Benwell. A torc can be seen around the neck, and the hair on the head curls forward so as to resemble two horns. Parts of the lower leg and forearm of the statue were also found, indicating that a life-sized statue of the god once stood in the temple.

The small temple of Antenociticus stands in the vicus (civilian settlement) outside Benwell (Condercum) Fort, one of 13 permanent forts added to the line of Hadrian's Wall during its construction. The temple was built in about AD 178-80, probably to mark the promotion of the Roman cavalry prefect who dedicated one of three altars in the temple to Antenociticus. It is thought Antenociticus was possibly worshipped as a source of inspiration and intercession in military matters. Antenociticus is not mentioned at any other Romano-British site or on any inscriptions from the Continent, hence his identification as a local deity.

The head of Antenociticus and the temple altars, formerly displayed at the Museum of Antiquities at Newcastle University, can now be seen at the Great North Museum in the same city of Newcastle.

=== Binchester ===
Archaeologists have speculated that a similar sandstone head, unearthed at Binchester Roman Fort near Bishop Auckland in 2013, may also be of Antenociticus.

== Sources ==
- Museum of Antiquities, Newcastle Upon Tyne, England Dead link, Current main link for same museum: http://www.newcastle-antiquaries.org.uk - An archived version of the old page from April 2009 can be seen here:
- "CONDERCVM Hadrian's Wall Fort and Settlement".
- Ross, A (1967): Pagan Celtic Britain: Studies in Iconography and Tradition. [Academy Chicago Publishers; New edition of Revised edition (15 Jan 1996)]
- "BBC News "Head of 'Geordie Roman god' found at Binchester"". BBC. 2013.
