= Carrawburgh =

Settlement in Northumberland, England

- Brocolitia, Procolita, or Brocolita
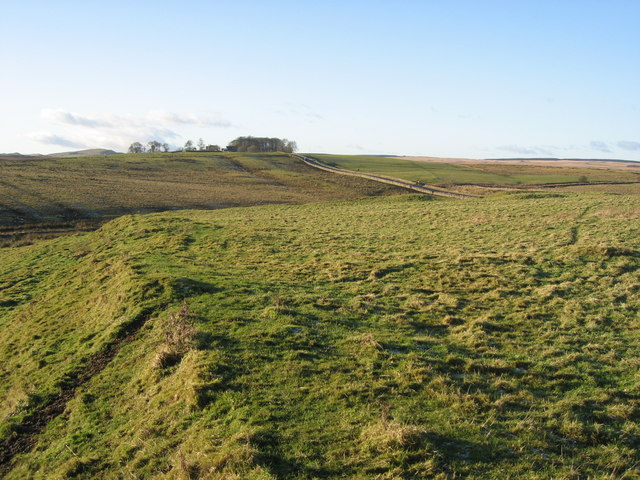
- Southern rampart of Brocolitia

- Location within Northumberland
- 55°02′10″N 2°13′23″W
- Location: Northumberland, England

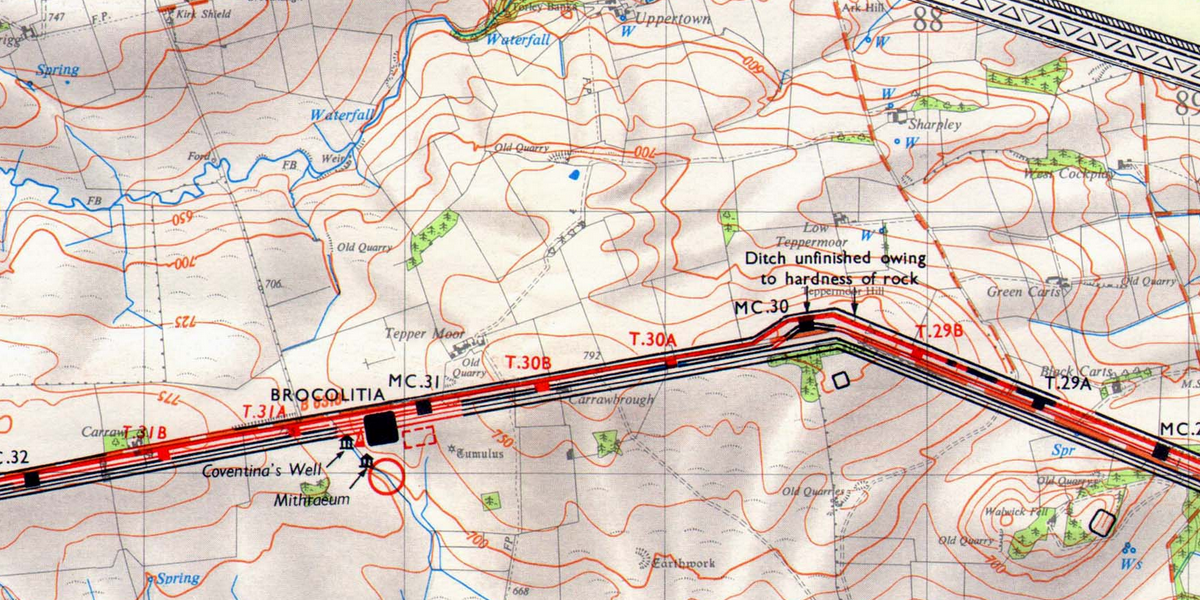
Brocolitia (1964 OS map)

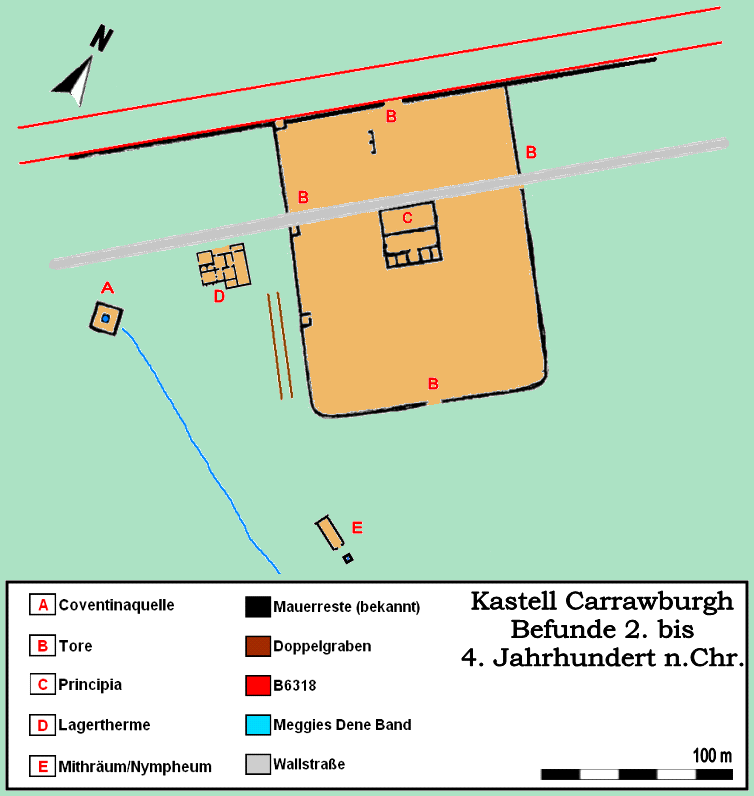
Carrawburgh plan

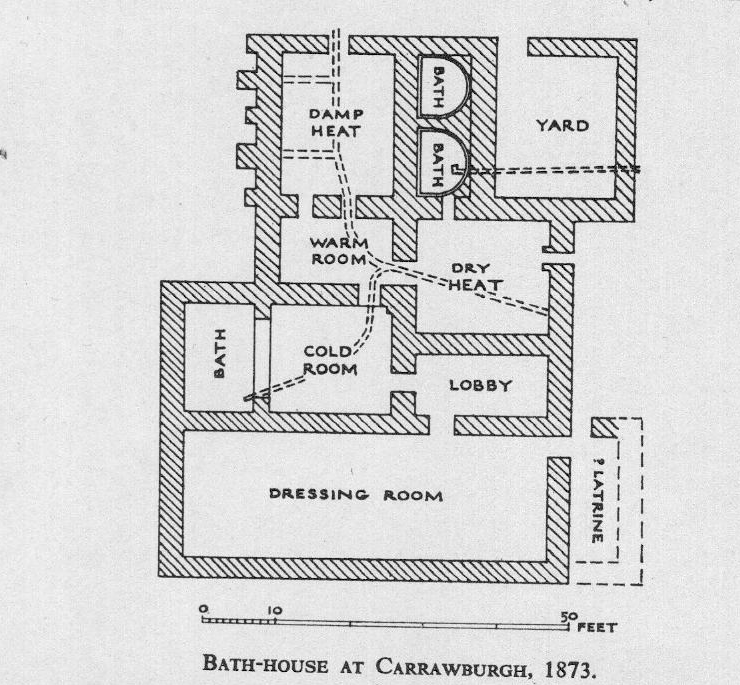
Baths

Carrawburgh is a settlement in Northumberland. In Roman times, it was the site of a 3 1/2-acre (1.5 ha) auxiliary fort on Hadrian's Wall called Brocolitia, Procolita, or Brocolita.

The name "Procolita" is found in the 5th-century document, the Notitia Dignitatum, and "Brocoliti" in the 7th-century Ravenna Cosmography. The name is probably based on the Celtic name for the place, and one possible translation put forward is 'badger holes'.

== Roman fort ==
Hadrian's Wall was built from 122 AD and most of the wall forts a few years later. Brocolitia was built a few years later still probably to fill a slightly longer gap between forts at Housesteads, 5.2 miles (8.4 km) away, and Chesters, 3.5 miles (5.6 km) away. This later date is evidenced by part of the Vallum being levelled before building the fort showing that it was an afterthought. A date of 130 has been suggested from a fragmentary inscription now in the Chesters Museum. The fort either used the Wall (narrow gauge on a broad base at this point) itself as its northern rampart, or was built parallel to it but detached. The fort was about a mile west of the Wall's northernmost point at Milecastle 30, also known as Limestone Corner.

Only the fort's earthworks are now visible, the Wall at this point and the fort's north ramparts having been demolished for the construction of General Wade's early 18th-century military road (now the B6318). The late 19th-century archaeologist John Clayton carried out a partial excavation of the site, revealing a military bath-house outside the fort's west gate (in 1873) and the fort's south-west corner-tower (in 1876).

The Roman Inscriptions of Britain lists 48 inscriptions for the site. They show its garrisoning units to have been as follows:

- Cohors I Tungrorum 122-138 AD, later at Housesteads
- Cohors I Aquitanorum c. 133
- Cohors I Cugernorum, end 2nd century
- Cohors I Batavorum 213-222, 237, and 400 respectively

The First Cohort of Frisiavones are also attested at Brocolitia at some stage, as shown by an inscription on an altar stone, which tells us that Optio Maus had repaid a vow to the goddess Coventina. (This unit is also recorded as present at Ardotalia.) Whether this altar was the repayment of the vow is unknown.

== Vicus ==
The vicus (civilian settlement) was just outside the west side of the fort and covered about 4 hectares.

== Roman sanctuaries ==
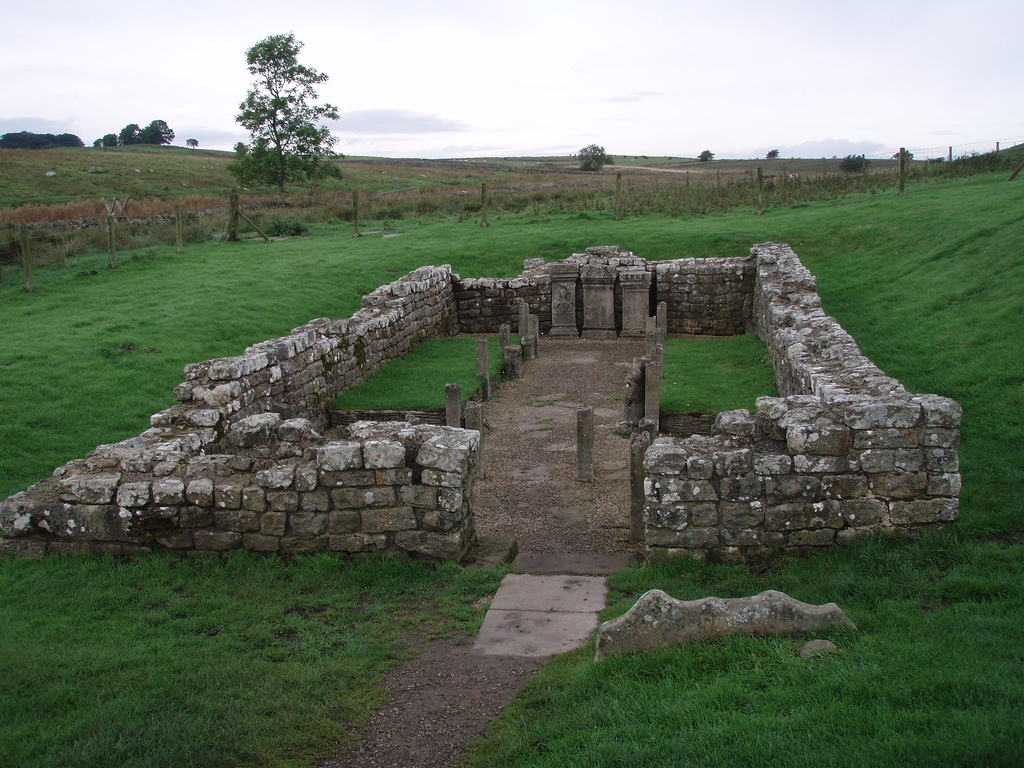
Remains of the Brocolitia mithraeum.

The remains of three Roman sanctuaries have been discovered in the low-lying marshy ground beyond the fort's south-west corner. All three sites lie adjacent to a small tributary stream of Meggie's Dene Burn, which runs three miles from Carrawburgh to empty into the River South Tyne near Newbrough's fort on the Stanegate.

Nearest to the fort, about 80 metres (260 ft) from its south-west corner, are the remains of an early 3rd century mithraeum, i.e. a temple of the mystery cult of the Roman god Mithras. Discovered in 1949 and excavated by I.A. Richmond and J.P. Gillam in 1950, it is the second-most northernly mithraeum discovered so far – only Bremenium (High Rochester), more than 10 miles (16 km) from Brocolitia, is further north. Like most other mithraea, the Brocolitia temple was built to resemble a cave, and also had the usual anteroom, and a nave with raised benches (podia) along the sides.

At Brocolitia, the anteroom and nave were separated by a wattle-work screen, the base of which was found exceptionally well preserved. Excavations revealed three stages of development: the first stage was small, around 5.5 metres (18 ft) wide and 8 metres (26 ft) long. The building was expanded to 11 metres (36 ft) in length in a second stage, at which time the temple also gained elaborate furnishings and extensive woodwork. This second stage existed for the entire 3rd century, and included at least two major renovations. The second stage was looted and the furnishings destroyed around 296–297 AD, but the sanctuary itself and the stone monuments remained intact, and the temple was re-equipped in a third stage shortly thereafter. The third stage includes three monuments by different cohort prefects, commanders of Cohors I Batavorum, a Roman Batavi unit of auxiliary cavalry stationed at Brocolitia. All three date to the 3rd century. The youngest coin found on the premises was a freshly-minted follis of Maximian (r. 296–308). This coincides with the third structural period on Hadrian's Wall (297–367), but the complete lack of coins from after 308 suggests that the temple did not remain in use for much of the 4th century. The temple was deliberately desecrated by the removal of the primary tauroctony scene, only a piece of which was found. Other than a collapsed roof, the temple was found almost exactly as the Romans had left it. The foundations of the temple are still visible, as are the wooden stakes on which the podia benches were raised. A reconstruction of the sanctuary is on display at the Great North Museum in Newcastle upon Tyne.

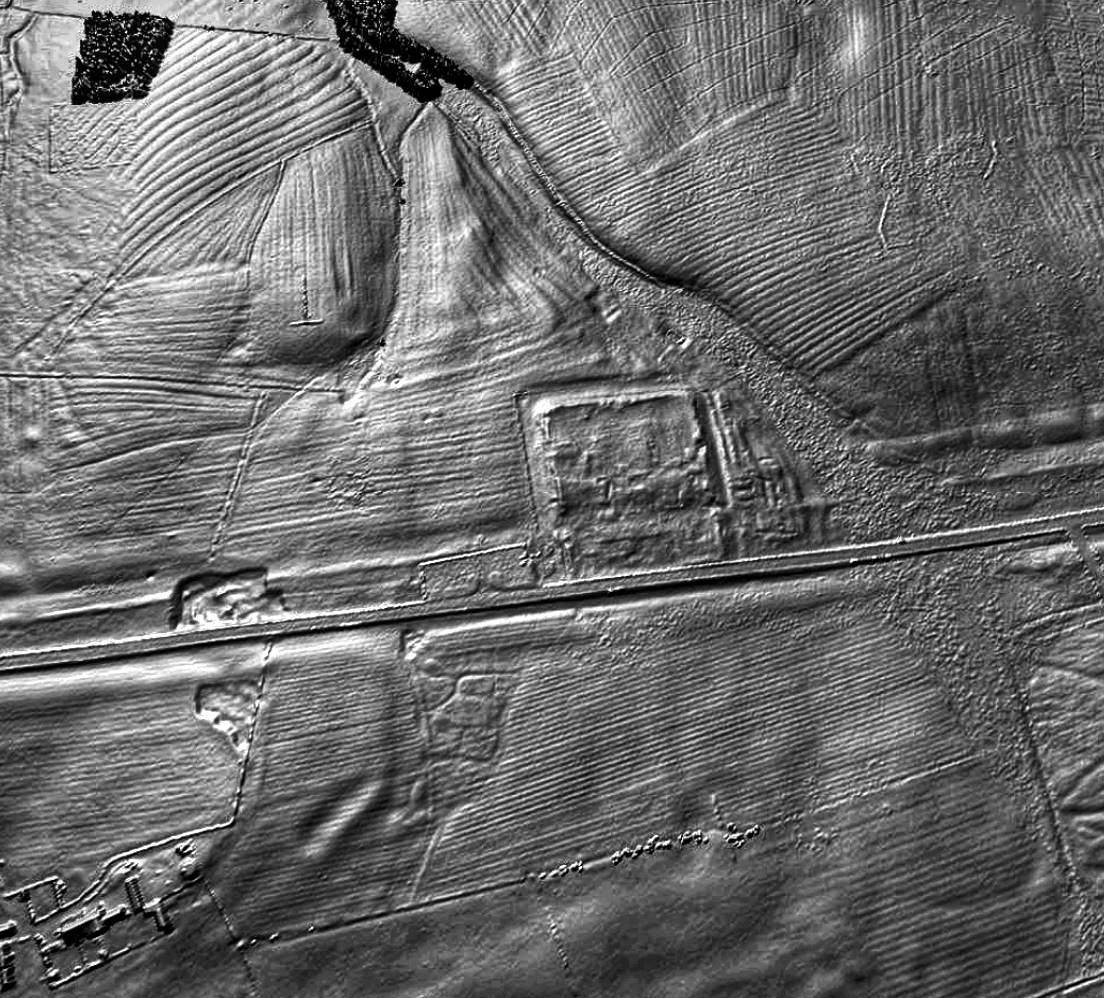
A lidar view from the northern side of Hadrian's Wall of Carrawburgh Roman fort and vicus.

Directly in front of the entrance to the mithraeum the remains of an apse, well, and altar were found and named as the Shrine to the Nymphs and Genius Loci, sometimes referred to as a "nymphaeum". Found in 1957 and excavated in 1960, this was the least used temple at Carrawburgh. The Shrine may not have had a traditional building, rather it was a paved and an open air shrine. The altar, dedicated by M. Hispanius Modestinus c. AD 213, was inscribed identically on two sides, and stood on a pedestal indicating it was out in the open, and meant to be walked around. It is likely that this shrine was built during a period of disuse of the Mithraeum as it was located so close to the Mithraic Temple. The building of the second Mithraeum reused materials from the Shrine to the Nymphs and Genius Loci, but preserved the altar. The shrine has a destruction layer around AD 300, roughly the same time as a destruction layer at the Temple to Mithras.

The third site was 'Coventina's Well', a centre for worship of the Romano-British goddess Coventina. This sanctuary, discovered by Clayton in 1876, is the source of the stream. In 1879 the well was explored yielding 13,487 coins and many other objects including sculptural reliefs, and altars. It was built c.AD128-133, during the construction of the Vallum, in order to help control the water level of the area, it is likely after this it became associated with Coventina with the height of the cult being in the late 2nd to early 3rd centuries when the Batavians were stationed at the fort. No remains of the nymphaeum or well are now visible.

== Ownership ==
Having been in private hands for many years, the fort, which is a scheduled monument, was gifted to the nation in January 2020 by Jennifer Du Cane, whose family have owned the site since the 1950s. The fort is now in the ownership of Historic England and administered by English Heritage.

== Sources ==
- Grundy, John (2022). History of Northumberland. Newcastle upon Tyne: Tyne Bridge Publishing. ISBN 9781838280970.
