= Milecastle 30 =

Milecastle on Hadrian's Wall in England

- Northumberland, England, UK
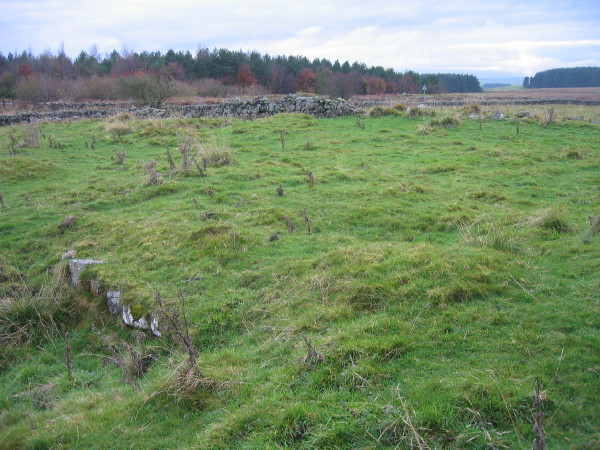
- The site of Milecastle 30

Location
- Location in Northumberland
- Coordinates: 55.038503°N 2.196562°W
- Grid reference: NY87537157

Milecastle 30 (Limestone Corner) was a milecastle of the Roman Hadrian's Wall. Its remains exist as an outward-facing scarp with a maximum height of 0.8 metres (2.6 ft). Masonry from the east wall (both faces) remains in situ. The remaining stretch is 3.1 metres (10 ft) in length by 2.25 metres (7.4 ft) thick, and survives to a height of 0.6 metres (2.0 ft). It is located at the western part of Limestone Corner, just off the B6318 Military Road.

== Construction ==
Milecastle 30 was a long-axis milecastle though the gateways were never excavated and so the type has not been identified. Such milecastles were thought to have been constructed by the legio VI Victrix who were based in Eboracum (York), or by the legio XX Valeria Victrix who were based in Deva Victrix (Chester).

The only stated dimension (with the exception of the surviving east wall) for the milecastle is the North South length of 65.5 feet (20.0 m).

== Excavations and investigations ==
- 1927 – The milecastle is visited and examined by FG Simpson. The north–south length is identified at this time, and the presence of the Military Way noted.
- 1951 – The wing walls (and curtain beyond the wing walls) are excavated. It is discovered that the curtain is Narrow gauge on Broad gauge foundations.
- 1965 – English Heritage Field Investigation. It was noted that the remains consisted of a mutilated earth platform, with a 3.0-metre (9.8 ft) fragment of the east wall exposed near the north-east corner. It was also noted that the Military Way was well defined by the presence of an agger and ground swelling.
- 1989 – English Heritage Field Investigation (as part of the Hadrian's Wall Project). Previous observations were reconfirmed.

== Associated turrets ==
Each milecastle on Hadrian's Wall had two associated turret structures. These turrets were positioned approximately one-third and two-thirds of a Roman mile to the west of the Milecastle, and would probably have been manned by part of the milecastle's garrison. The turrets associated with Milecastle 30 are known as Turret 30A and Turret 30B.

=== Turret 30A ===
Turret 30A (Carrawburgh East) lies mostly under the B6138 Military Road, though the south face was discovered in 1912 on the south side of the road. Its actual position is about 40 metres (44 yd) west of the calculated position, as measured from Milecastle 30, but correct as measured from Turret 30B. This suggests that the turrets were laid out first, and the difference is due to the site of Milecastle 30 being repositioned slightly to the summit of Tuppermoor Hill.

Further excavation in 1966, and English heritage Field Investigations in 1965 and 1989 failed to find the remains.

Location on Ordnance Survey 1:25 000 map: 55.037115°N 2.204441°W

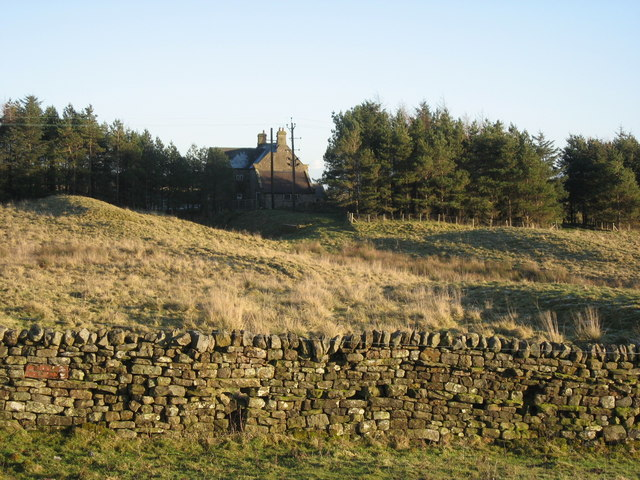
The site of Turret 30B

=== Turret 30B ===
Turret 30B (Carrawburgh West) exists as a 0.6-metre-high (2.0 ft) mound, 40 metres (44 yd) west of the track to Carrawburgh Farm. The west wall was discovered in 1912, though a 1966 excavation by RW Harris of Durham University proved inconclusive, as did visits by English Heritage Field Investigators in 1966 and 1989.

Location on Ordnance Survey 1:25 000 map: 55.036473°N 2.212167°W

== Monument records ==
Monument	Monument Number	English Heritage Archive Number
Milecastle 30	16692	NY 87 SE 6
Turret 30A	16695	NY 87 SE 7
Turret 30B	16698	NY 87 SE 8

== Public access ==
Although on private land, the site of the milecastle is visible over a wall adjoining the Hadrian's Wall Path National Trail.

Nothing is visible of Turrets 30A and 30B, but their sites are accessible from the B6318 Military Road.

== Bibliography ==
- Daniels, Charles (1979), "Review: Fact and Theory on Hadrian's Wall", Britannia, 10: 357–364, doi:10.2307/526069, JSTOR 526069
