= Vallum (Hadrian's Wall) =

Earthwork associated with Hadrian's Wall, England

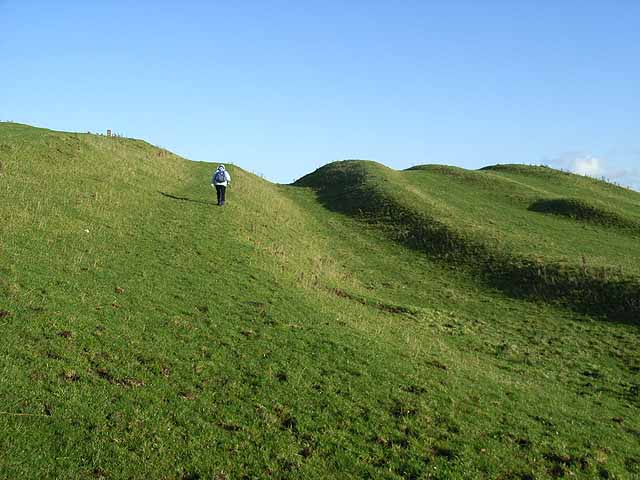
The Vallum at Downhill

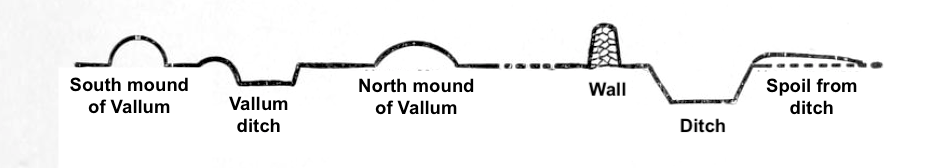
Typical cross-section of Hadrian's Wall and Vallum

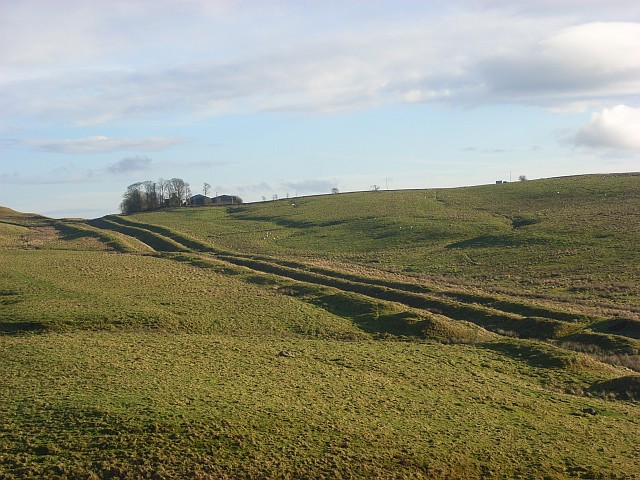
The Vallum at Cawfields

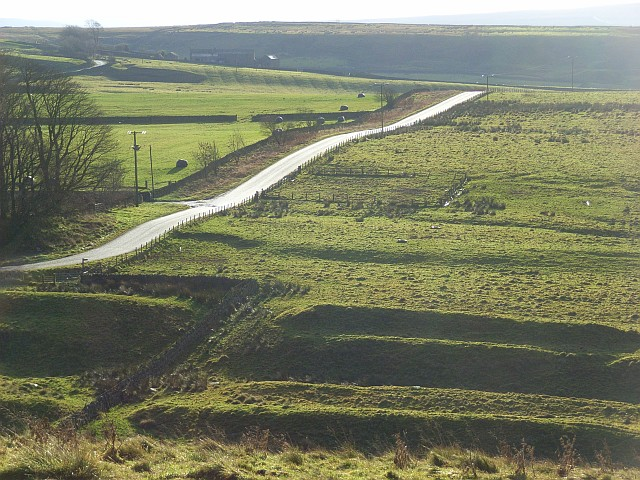
The road and Vallum at Shield on the Wall

The Vallum is a huge earthwork associated with Hadrian's Wall in England. Unique on any Roman frontier, it runs practically from coast to coast to the south of the wall. It was built a few years after the wall. Current opinion is that the Vallum demarcated the southern boundary of a military zone, bounded on the north by the wall.

The earliest surviving mention of the earthwork is by Bede who refers to a vallum, or earthen rampart, as distinct from the wall, or murus; the term is still used despite the fact that the essential element is a ditch, or fossa.

== Layout and course ==
The Vallum comprises a ditch that is nominally 6 metres (20 ft) wide and 3 metres (10 ft) deep, with a flat bottom, flanked by two mounds about 6 metres wide and 2 metres (7 ft) high, set back some 9 metres (30 ft) from the ditch edges. For a great deal of its length a third lower mound, the so-called marginal mound, occupies the south berm (flat area between mound and ditch), right on the southern lip of the ditch. The total width of the fortification (consisting from north to south of mound, berm, ditch, marginal mound, berm, mound) was thus about 36 metres (100 ft). In several places (for example at Heddon-on-the-Wall and Limestone Corner) the Vallum was cut through solid rock, sometimes for lengthy distances.

The distance of the Vallum from the Wall varies. In general there was a preference for the earthwork to run close to the rear of the wall where topography allowed. In the central sector the wall runs along the top of the crags of the Whin Sill, while the Vallum, laid out in long straight stretches, lies in the valley below to the south, as much as 700 metres (2,300 ft) away.

== History ==
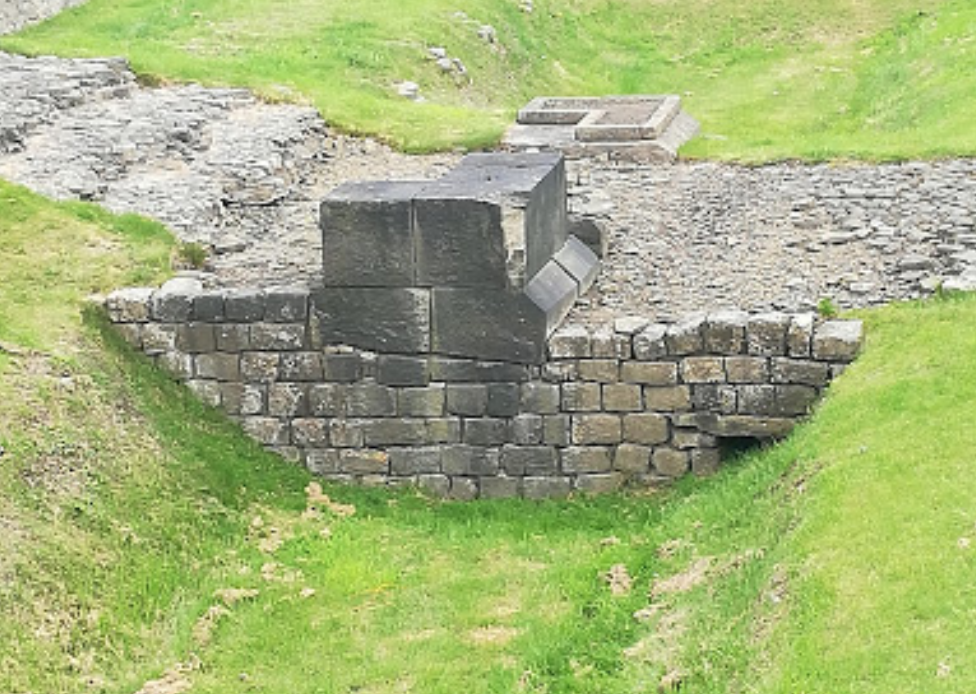
The Vallum Crossing at Benwell in western Newcastle upon Tyne, just south of the fort of Condercum. The central ditch that it crosses has been largely filled in

The Vallum was constructed a few years after the wall was completed, as it deviates to the south around the first series of forts (including Chesters) but earlier than that at Carrawburgh, datable to c. 130 by a fragmentary inscription. There would have been a crossing point like a causeway or bridge to the south of each wall-fort; several such causeways are known, such as the one still visible with the base of an ornate arch at the fort of Condercum in Benwell, a western suburb of Newcastle. Causeways have also been detected to the south of several milecastles.

It is thought that the easternmost section of Hadrian's Wall between the forts of Pons Aelius (Newcastle upon Tyne) and Segedunum (Wallsend) was an addition to the original plan. The Vallum was not constructed behind this extra length of the wall and did not apparently even reach the fort at Newcastle; instead it seems it stopped in the western Newcastle suburb of Elswick. This was probably because from here on the Vallum's function as a southern barrier to the wall was performed by the River Tyne.

Sometime later in the 2nd century and certainly by the 3rd, the Vallum was "slighted", that is, the ramparts were broken through and the ditch filled in especially near the forts and the undefended settlements which grew up outside them. Archaeologists have speculated that either the Vallum was then deemed unnecessary because economic development and pacification of the frontier district had rendered it obsolete, or that it was proving to be a hindrance to military and authorised civilian traffic. Some have suggested that this coincided with the building of the Antonine Wall in Scotland and the temporary abandonment of Hadrian's Wall.

== Purpose ==
Although there is no definitive historical evidence as to why the Roman army built this unusual barrier, modern archaeological opinion is that the Vallum established the southern boundary of an exclusion zone bounded on the north by the wall itself. The zone would have been "out-of-bounds" to civilians and those with no valid reason to be there.

== Excavations ==
The first excavation was undertaken in 1893 at Great Hill (at Heddon-on-the-Wall), where it was observed that the Vallum ditch was cut through a seam of fire-clay which was deployed in both mounds. This excavation demonstrated that the main north and south mounds were contemporary and built using material dug from the ditch. In the late 20th century several excavations established that the marginal mound was also contemporary.
