= Foyboat =

Small vessel primarily used to assist the mooring and servicing of a larger vessel

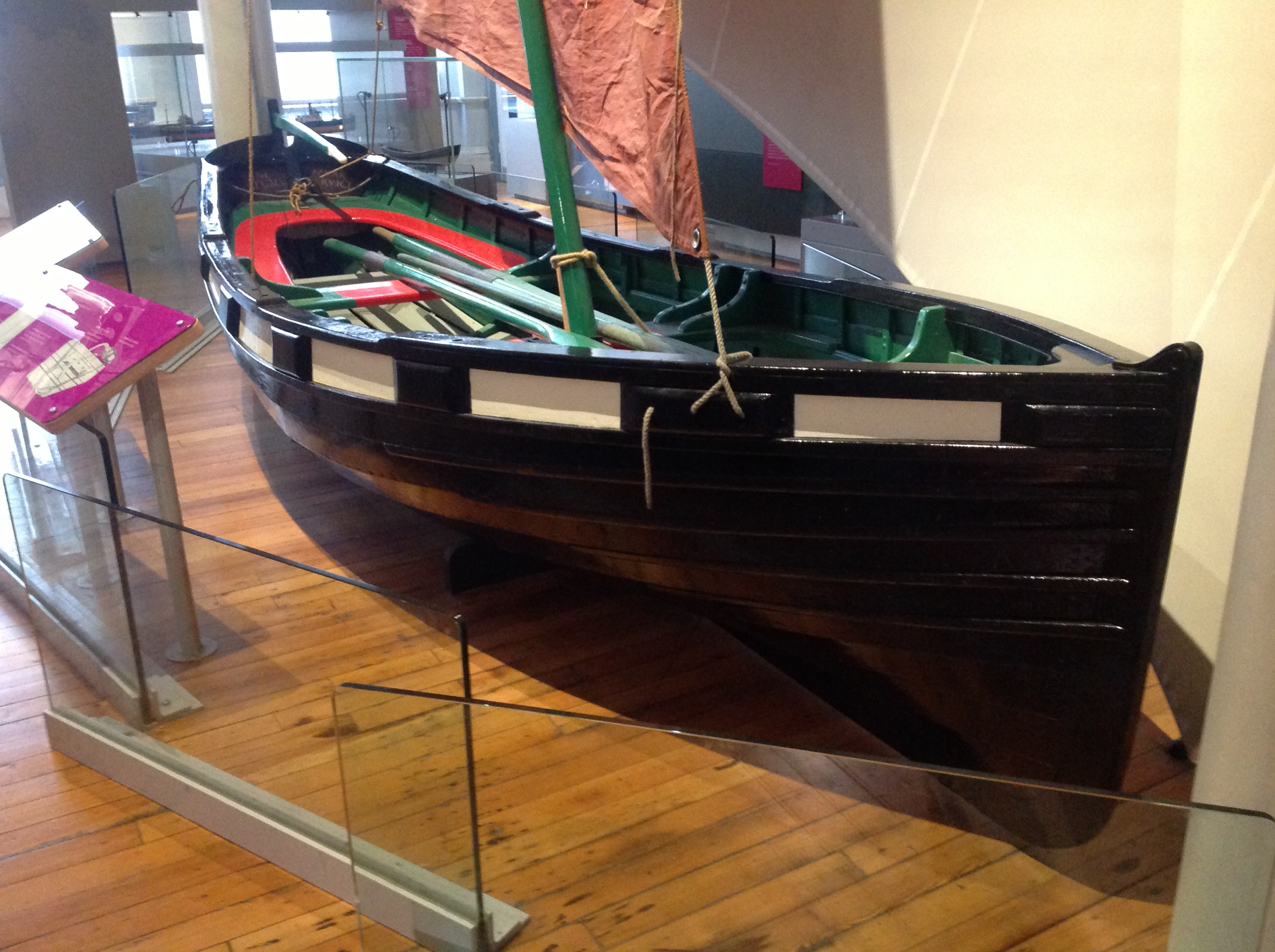
- Replica Foyboat Bonny Tyne displayed in Tyne & Wear Archives & Museums Discovery Museum, Newcastle Upon Tyne.

A foyboat is a small vessel primarily used to assist the mooring and servicing of a larger vessel. It is not a tug per se. The word has often been associated with the rivers of North East England.

== Origins ==
The etymology directly ties this dialect word to a workboat of the River Tyne (and also the Wear and Tees) used to assist larger vessels. Foy has been said to equal "fee" and these small boats might go as far south as the Tees seeking work and then returning with the vessel they had contracted to. The exact origins of this humble boat type are lost but as the collier trade in sail developed out of the rivers of the North East of England, there would have been a great need for small vessels to tend larger ones. The work involved would typically be handling lines between shore and vessel (and later to tugs), handling anchor and buoy work, acting as informal ferries taking crew and provisions to anchored vessels and to each river bank. The reason a distinct vessel and type of crew evolved was down to an association between families and the job and the need to evolve a design whose first requirement was ruggedness and stability. Before the mechanical tug evolved a rowing boat was the only way to tow sailing vessels in and out of the river estuaries during periods of calm or contrary winds.

== Usage ==
The Foyboat was recognised in local dialect by the turn of the 18th/19th century. By then "at that time on the River Wear, we had about one hundred and fifty foy boats built on the same plan as a man'o war's gig but much neater (they) were very fast pulling boats". Under sail the performance of the Foy boat was not exceptional, but under oar it was a different matter – they were excellent rowing boats. They could be rowed conventionally or sculled. During the second half of the 20th century, the triumph of small scale marine diesels or petrol engines ensured the end of the traditional Foyboat. Yards would however still use the outline in a motorised form and offer a "Foyboat". An example was Robson's of South Shields in 1979.

Within the Port of Tyne, foyboats evolved differently from the River Wear where the hull design was more closely associated with the Coble to create the foy coble. The surviving Peggy is to this design. Both types have been studied by Adrian Osler who worked at Tyne & Wear Museums. It is Osler who mentions an association between the foyboatmen and publicans in the sense that the latter provided capital for boat construction and ownership. The link is interesting in that this ties into surviving usage in public houses in Kent.

A notable change which is reflected in the pattern of the current day River Tees operation (see Further reading below) was the shift from racing competitively to secure work to the adoption of a rota system of work. The process of regularising the procurement of work owes much on the River Tees to the formation of the first Foyboatman's Association. This and much else about the everyday lives of Tees Foyboatmen was recorded in a 2013 feature whose verdict is worth quoting "Although it is one of the most obscure occupations on the River Tees, or anywhere else for that matter, it is also one of the oldest and most vital".

Published material in 2013 reveals that eight licensed foyboats work on the River Tees. As build costs accelerated, the river's own foyboat association commissioned and owned its own boats rather than the private individuals. The first example in 1964 cost £1,100 then. In 2013 the rough replacement cost of a Tees boat is £200,000 with a planned working life of a decade. In that year the association employed ten people with a further forty "members". It has become a form of co-operative.

== Usage outside North East England ==
The term is known to have been used elsewhere in Britain. Around Ramsgate and Margate is one example. The presence of anchored vessels in The Downs would explain the need for such service.

== Survivors ==
For a humble work boat and not one that translates into any form of popular or racing design, a surprising number feature in museum collections. They are:

- Bonny Tyne is a replica commissioned in 1979 from F McNulty of South Shields for the Tyne & Wear County Council Museums Service. After some time on the water, it is now displayed in the Discovery Museum at Newcastle.
- Peggy is an original Wear foyboat made at Gally's Sunderland yard in the 1890s now in the care of Tyne & Wear Archives & Museums and in the Regional Museum Store at Beamish Museum. her museum accession number is TWCMS : S1266. Some forty years ago she was displayed in The Science Museum, Exhibition Park, Newcastle upon Tyne. She was initially secured by The Maritime Trust, then lent to Tyne and Wear County Council and now held by the successor Tyne & Wear Archives & Museums.
- Joan which came from the South Shield's yard Mitchelsons in the 1920s. She was acquired by the North East Maritime Trust and is being restored to pre 1939 order.
- Ethel This River Tyne foy boat was built in 1907 and is in the National Maritime Museum Cornwall collection at Falmouth, Cornwall. A detailed account of this boat Ethel is given. Her working life lasted until about 1976. She was restored by Mr R Elsey of Whitburn, South Tyneside.

== Museum models ==
- Mary a Foy Coble is in the Tyne & Wear Archives & Museums collections catalogue number B9772. Made in 1922 by J Hill-Thompson.
- Edith a 1:20 scale Tyne Foyboat model is in the Tyne & Wear Archives & Museums collections catalogue number B9775.
- Joan a Foyboat is in the Tyne and Wear, restored by the North East Maritime Trust based in South Shields.
