= List of museums in Tyne and Wear =

This list of museums in Tyne and Wear, England contains museums which are defined for this context as institutions (including nonprofit organizations, government entities, and private businesses) that collect and care for objects of cultural, artistic, scientific, or historical interest and make their collections or related exhibits available for public viewing. Also included are non-profit art galleries and university art galleries. Museums that exist only in cyberspace (i.e., virtual museums) are not included.

| Name | Image | Town/City | Region | Type | Summary |
|---|---|---|---|---|---|
| Arbeia Roman Fort and Museum | | South Shields | South Tyneside | Archaeology | Excavated and reconstructed Roman fort, museum of artefacts and life of a Roman soldier |
| Baltic Centre for Contemporary Art | | Gateshead | Gateshead | Art | Contemporary art |
| Bessie Surtees House | | Newcastle upon Tyne | Newcastle upon Tyne | Historic house | Operated by Historic England, two five-storey 16th and 17th century merchants' houses |
| Bowes Railway | | Springwell | City of Sunderland | Railway | Preserved operational standard gauge cable railway system built to transport coal to boats, built by George Stephenson in 1826 |
| Castle Keep | | Newcastle upon Tyne | Newcastle upon Tyne | Historic house | Keep and remains of the medieval castle |
| Centre for Life | | Newcastle upon Tyne | Newcastle upon Tyne | Science | Permanent exhibits about human life |
| Customs House | | South Shields | South Tyneside | Art | Arts centre with exhibit gallery, theatre and cinema |
| Discovery Museum | | Newcastle upon Tyne | Newcastle upon Tyne | Multiple | Science, local history, shipbuilding and industrial heritage, Turbinia, first steam turbine powered steamship, regimental museum for the 15th/19th The King's Royal Hussars and the Northumberland Hussars, costumes, art exhibits of painting, photography and sculpture |
| Fulwell Windmill | | Fulwell | City of Sunderland | Mill | restored early 19th century windmill |
| Gateshead Heritage @ St Mary`s | | Gateshead | Gateshead | Local | local history, culture, |
| Globe Gallery | | North Shields | North Tyneside | Art | contemporary art |
| Great North Museum: Hancock | | Newcastle upon Tyne | Newcastle upon Tyne | Multiple | Natural history, archaeology and Roman Britain, Ancient Rome and Egypt, dinosaurs and fossils, ethnography |
| Hatton Gallery | | Newcastle upon Tyne | Newcastle upon Tyne | Art | Part of Newcastle University |
| Holy Jesus Hospital | | Newcastle upon Tyne | Newcastle upon Tyne | History | Operated by the National Trust, medieval building in use for 700 years, exhibits about its use as a 14th-century Augustinian friary, 17th century almshouse and Victorian soup kitchen |
| Jarrow Hall | | Jarrow | South Tyneside | Multiple | Life and times of monk, scholar and author Venerable Bede, includes artifacts from the adjacent medieval church, museum exhibits, Anglo-Saxon demonstration farm with heritage breeds of animals |
| Laing Art Gallery | | Newcastle upon Tyne | Newcastle upon Tyne | Art | Collections include 18th and 18th century British oil paintings and sculpture, watercolours, ceramics, silver and glassware, 20th century art |
| Monkwearmouth Station Museum | | Monkwearmouth | City of Sunderland | Railway | Formerly Railway and transportation history and heritage, now contains a collection of football memorabilia. |
| National Glass Centre | | Sunderland | City of Sunderland | Art | Historic and contemporary glass, history of glass-making |
| Newburn Hall Motor Museum | | Newburn | Newcastle upon Tyne | Automotive | information |
| North East Land, Sea and Air Museums | | Sunderland | City of Sunderland | Aviation | Historic aircraft, aviation history, Military vehicles, historic emergency services vehicles, buses and trams. |
| Northern Gallery for Contemporary Art | | Sunderland | City of Sunderland | Art | Contemporary art |
| Northumbria University Gallery | | Newcastle upon Tyne | Newcastle upon Tyne | Art | part of Northumbria University |
| Old Low Light | | North Shields | North Tyneside | Maritime heritage | Galleries, exhibits, activities, viewing platform and café, housed in a former lighthouse |
| Path Head Watermill | | Blaydon | Gateshead | Industry | Restored water wheel and joiner's shop |
| Reg Vardy Gallery | | Sunderland | City of Sunderland | Art | information, contemporary art gallery of the University of Sunderland |
| Ryhope Engines Museum | | Ryhope | City of Sunderland | Technology | Victorian pumping station with two beam engines, steam engines and pumps, boilers, a blacksmith's forge, waterwheel, replica plumber's shop |
| Segedunum Roman Fort, Baths and Museum | | Wallsend | North Tyneside | Archaeology | Excavated Roman fort along Hadrian's Wall, museum of artefacts and life of a Roman soldier, shipbuilding and coal mining industries, reconstructed Roman baths |
| Seven Stories | | Newcastle upon Tyne | Newcastle upon Tyne | Art | Art of British children’s books |
| Shipley Art Gallery | | Gateshead | Gateshead | Art | Contemporary crafts and design, fine art |
| South Shields Museum & Art Gallery | | South Shields | South Tyneside | Local | local history, culture, art |
| Souter Lighthouse | | Marsden | South Tyneside | Maritime | Operated by the National Trust, lighthouse's engine room, light tower and keeper's living quarters |
| St. Mary's Lighthouse | | St Mary's Island | North Tyneside | Maritime | Lighthouse to tour, exhibits about the lighthouse and island's wildlife |
| Stephenson Railway Museum | | North Shields | North Tyneside | Railway | Steam-powered, electric and diesel engines, history of area electric transport, northern terminus of the North Tyneside Steam Railway |
| Sunderland Museum and Winter Gardens | | Sunderland | City of Sunderland | Multiple | Art, textiles, pottery, glass, coal mining, local history, social history, natural history, industry, geology |
| Tynemouth Castle and Priory | | Tynemouth | North Tyneside | Historic house | Operated by English Heritage, remains and exhibits about the Anglo-Saxon settlement, Anglican monastery, royal castle, artillery fort and coastal defence |
| Tynemouth Life Brigade Watch House Museum | | Tynemouth | North Tyneside | Maritime | history of area lifesaving, shipwreck artifacts |
| Tynemouth Toy Museum | | Tynemouth | North Tyneside | Toy | toys, dolls, prams, puzzles, games |
| Washington 'F' Pit | | Washington | City of Sunderland | Technology | Victorian steam engine, engine house and headgear for a coal mine |
| Washington Old Hall | | Washington | City of Sunderland | Historic house | Operated by the National Trust, 16th century stone manor house, ancestral home of the family of George Washington, the first President of the United States |

== Defunct museums ==
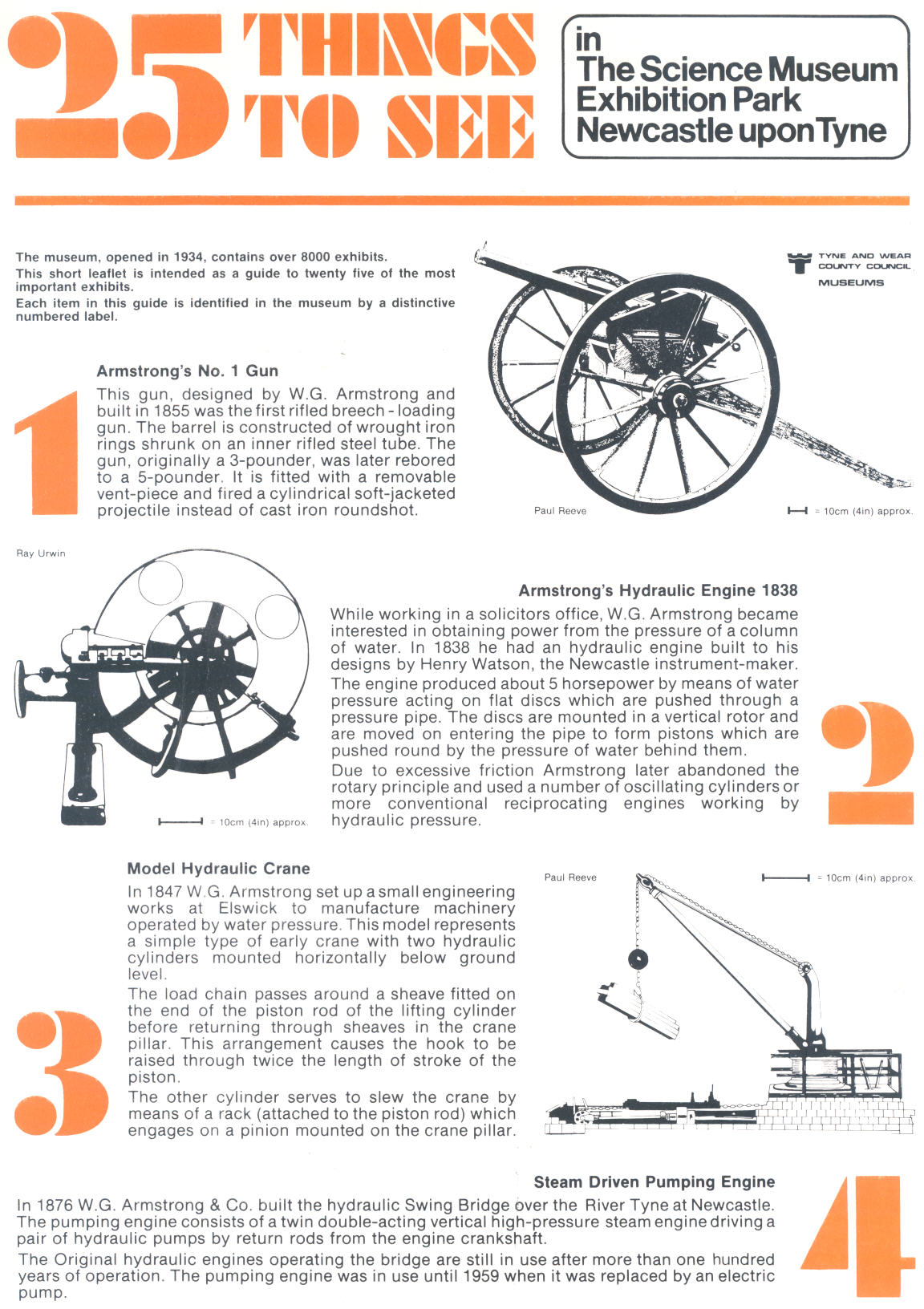
Memorabilia from one of Tyne & Wear's defunct museums. This guide of about 1980 is now at Discovery Museum. The entire document is on Wiki Commons (use Park 1>6.jpg in sequence to reach it. Remember this is a historical and not a current document.

- Dial Cottage, West Moor, Killingworth, one of the homes of George Stephenson from 1804 and where the infant Robert Stephenson grew up
- Military Vehicle Museum, Exhibition Park, Newcastle, closed in 2006, may reopen
- Municipal Museum of Science and Industry, Exhibition Park, Newcastle, collections now part of Discovery Museum
- Museum of Antiquities, collections now part of Great North Museum: Hancock
- Shefton Museum, collections now part of Great North Museum: Hancock

== See also ==
- Category:Tourist attractions in Tyne and Wear
