= Newcastle Pride =

Annual LGBT event in Newcastle upon Tyne, England

Coordinates: 54.9751°N 1.6065°W

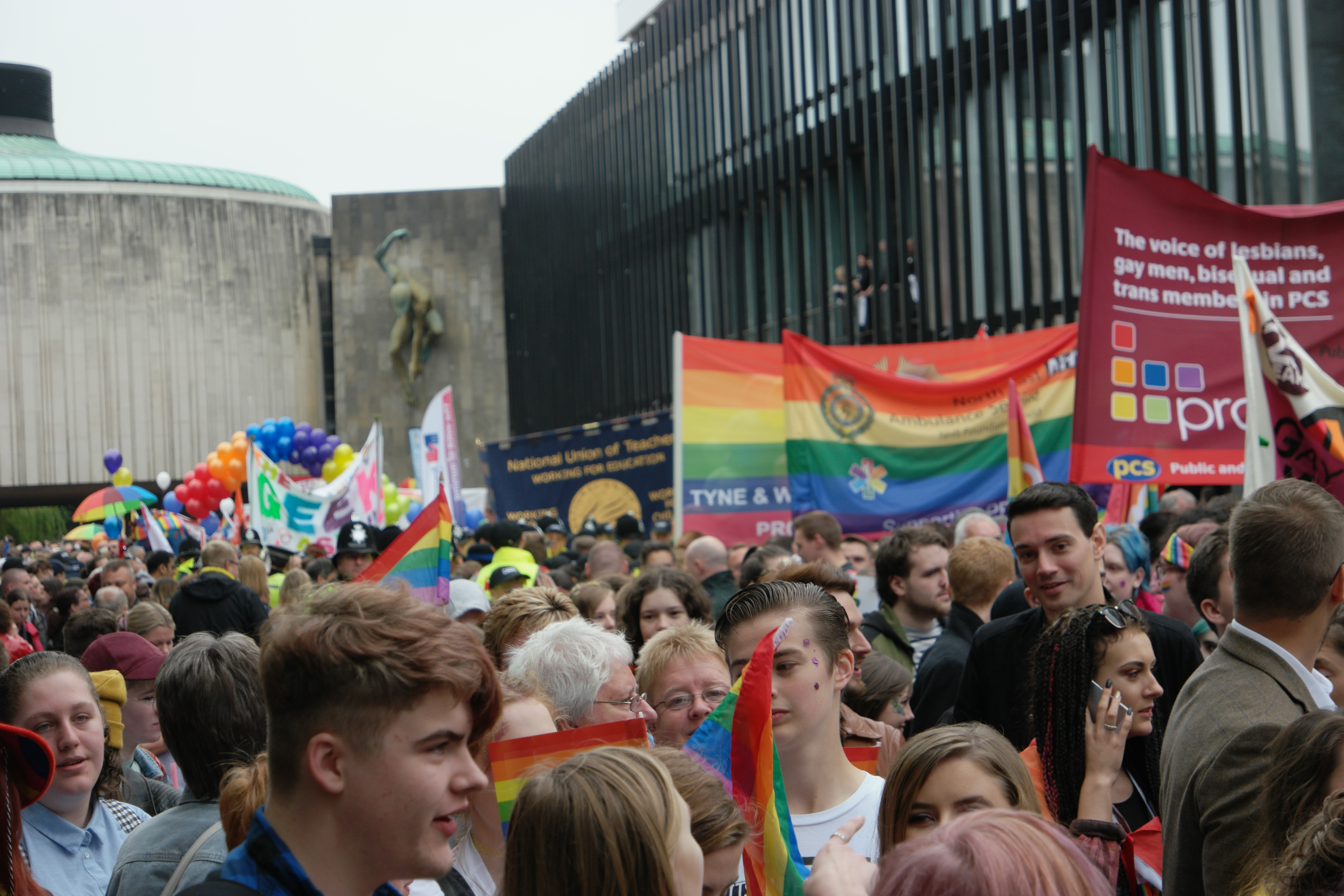
- Newcastle Pride outside the Civic Centre in 2017
- Frequency: Annually
- Locations: Newcastle upon Tyne, England
- Founded: 2008; 18 years ago
- Website: newcastlepride.co.uk

Newcastle Pride is an LGBTQ pride festival held annually in Newcastle upon Tyne. It is held each July, consisting of a three-day festival at Times Square, a parade, and free events held at various locations in the city. Originally named Pride on Tyne, it was organised by the charity Northern Pride until 2025 when its operation was handed over to Curious Futures, part of the charity Curious Arts.

== History ==
Originally beginning as Pride on Tyne, the first Newcastle Pride event was successfully hosted in July 2008, in Leazes Park. The Newcastle Pride committee later converted to a not for profit limited company in January 2009. The event moved to Exhibition Park, then moved to the Town Moor.

=== 2010s ===
2014 saw Newcastle Pride become a 3-day festival over 2 sites while remaining a free festival, attracting over 65,000 visitors with 7,000 parade participants. Marking the 45th anniversary of the first pride marches, it had a theme of 'One Love'. March Nichols, chair of Northern Pride, said the event boosted the economy of the city by over £7.5 million.

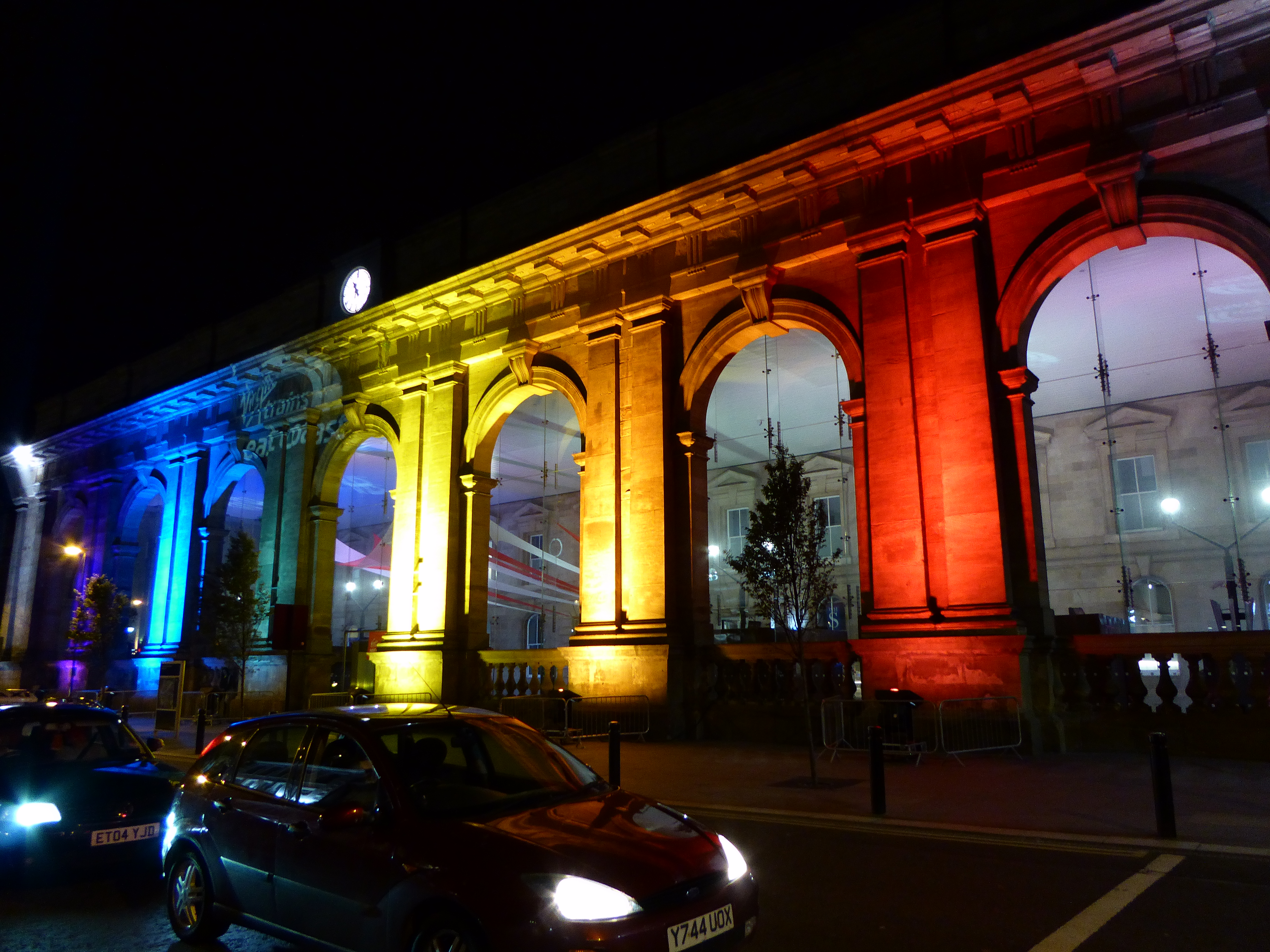
Newcastle railway station lit for Newcastle Pride in 2015

The 2015 parade was scheduled to run from Newcastle Civic Centre to the Town Moor. It remained free, though Gold Circle and VIP tickets were sold for £10 and £25 respectively. Headliners for the event were Belinda Carlisle and B*Witched, with Lucy Spraggan, Kitty Brucknell and Heather Peace also appearing A candlelight vigil was expected to close the festival.

=== 2020s ===
The 2024 event was later described by organisers as "a city-wide takeover".

The 2025 event was co-organised by Northern Pride and Curious Futures, whose parent group is the charity Curious Arts. A case was brought against Northumbria Police by a self-described "gender-critical" lesbian, alleging that Chief Constable Vanessa Jardine's decision to allow uniformed police officers to take part in the Newcastle Pride march was unlawful, and a High Court ruling supported this. Following this and promises of further legal action, Northumbria Police banned uniformed police officers, or police officers who could be identified as such, from taking part in the march though it said it would run a community stall at the event. Singer Pixie Lott and drag queens Michael Marouli and Bimini were set to perform, and Gok Wan was set to DJ for the event twice. The parade went ahead on 19 July despite rainy weather, and the event again closed with a vigil at Times Square.

In November 2025, after 17 years of running the event, Northern Pride ceased trading and made the decision to hand over Newcastle Pride to Curious Futures. After closing its outstanding commitments, Northern Pride donated its remaining £8,500 to Curious Futures to help the planning for the 2026 festival. This event was moved back a week to 25–26 July to avoid a clash with the 2026 FIFA World Cup final.
