= Royal Mining Engineering Jubilee Exhibition =

1887 exhibition in Newcastle

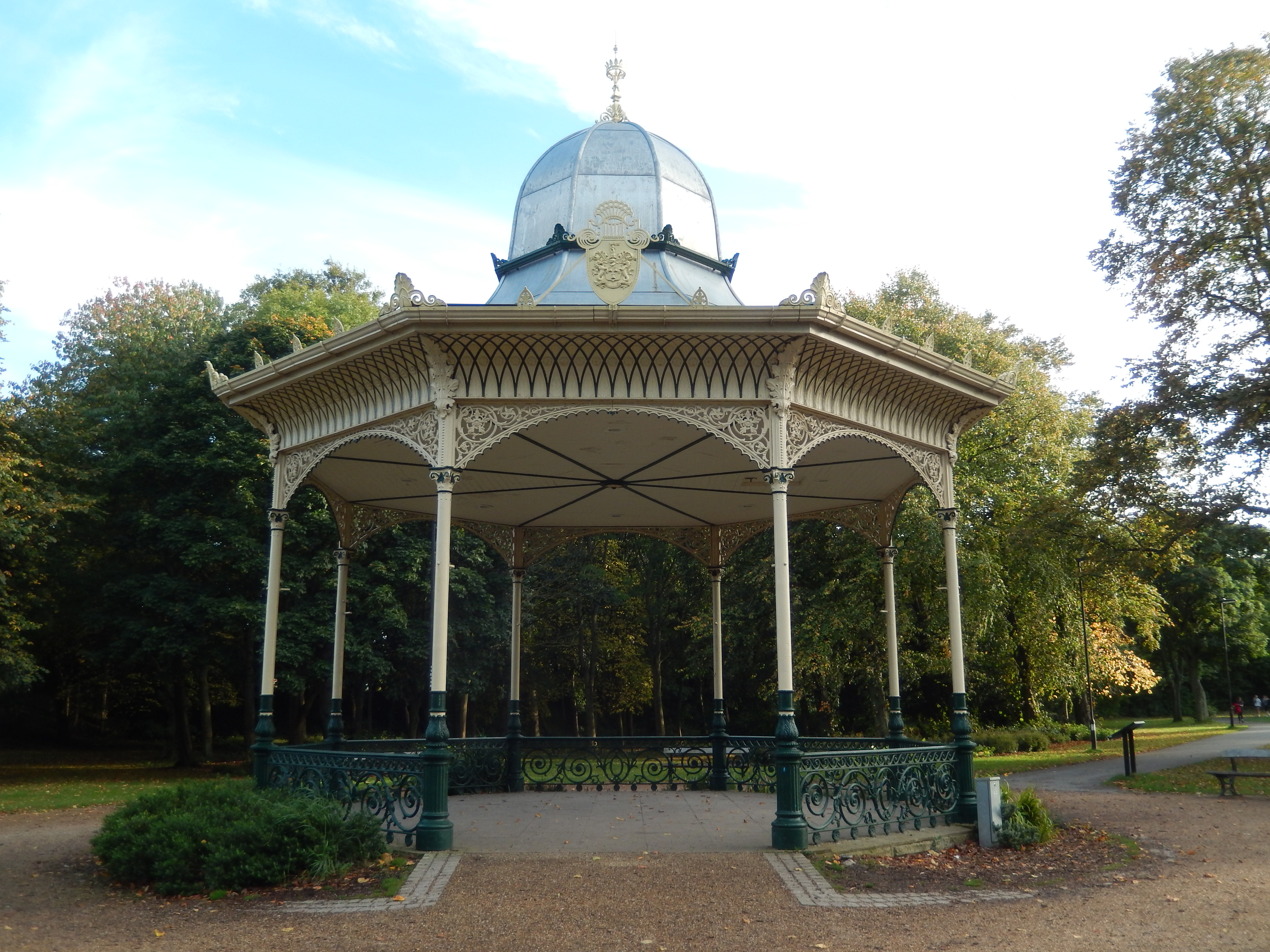
- Bandstand from the exhibition as shown in 2017

Overview
- BIE-class: Unrecognized exposition
- Name: Royal Mining Engineering Jubilee Exhibition
- Area: now Exhibition Park, Newcastle and Town Moor, Newcastle upon Tyne
- Visitors: 2 092 273

Location
- Country: United Kingdom of Great Britain and Ireland
- City: Newcastle upon Tyne

Timeline
- Opening: May 1887
- Closure: 28 October 1887

The Royal Mining Engineering Jubilee Exhibition was held in 1887 (delayed from planned 1886 opening) at Newcastle's Town Moor, Newcastle upon Tyne and Bull Park (renamed the Exhibition Park later in 1929.

== Summary ==
Over two million people attended, and the fair made money. It was opened in May 1887 by the Duke of Cambridge and closed 28 October 1887.

There was a two-storey refreshment pavilion, a two thirds size replica of the old Tyne Bridge, gardens, a theatre and art galleries.
