= North East Land, Sea and Air Museums =

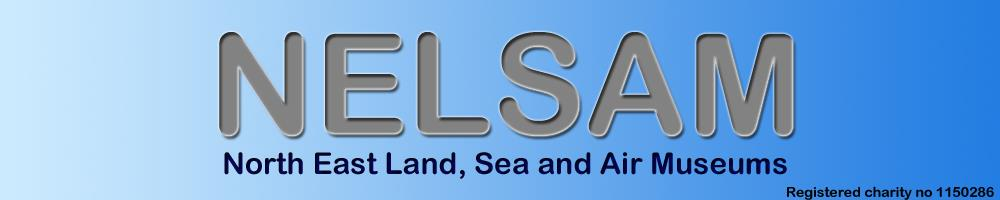

- Sunderland, Tyne and Wear, UK
- Established: 1974
- Location: Sunderland, Tyne and Wear, United Kingdom
- Coordinates: 54.924°N 1.470°W
- Type: Aviation museum
- Website: www.nelsam.org.uk

The North East Land, Sea and Air Museums (NELSAM), formerly the North East Aircraft Museum, is a volunteer-run aviation museum situated on the site of the former RAF Usworth/Sunderland Airport, between Washington and Sunderland, in Tyne and Wear, England. The museum has the largest aviation collection between Yorkshire and Scotland and houses over 30 aircraft and a wide collection of aero engines. The museum also has a small collection of other items such as weaponry, vehicles and other historical exhibits.

The museum also has special displays showing a replica of a Second World War British street and one honouring No. 607 Squadron RAF, which was based at RAF Usworth.

NELSAM is an English registered charity.

== History ==
The North East Land, Sea and Air Museums traces its origins back to the formation of the North East Vintage and Veteran Aircraft Association (NEAVVAA), which started meeting in March 1974 at the Sunderland Airport, which had been RAF Usworth. In March 1975 the group purchased a Westland WS-51 Dragonfly helicopter from a scrapyard and this became its first aircraft. The group continued to accumulate aircraft and in May 1977 changed its name to the Northumbian Aeronautical Collection. In 1979 the name was changed again, to North East Aircraft Museum. More aircraft were added, including an Avro Vulcan in January 1983.

The logo used when the museum was called the North East Aircraft Museum

In April 1984 the local government, Sunderland Council announced that the airport would be closed to make way for an automobile manufacturing plant. After protracted negotiations the museum was given a lease on a four-acre site just outside the airfield. In 1987 the museum was opened to the public on a full-time basis. In 1989 the museum started to fund raise to construct buildings to house at last some of the collection indoors and in 1991 planning authority was granted for a new hangar to be built, actual construction of which was started in 1993.

The museum used the old Sunderland Airport control tower for storage and administrative use and it was burnt in an arsonist attack in September 1996. On 23 January 1997, arsonists destroyed the museum's Vickers Valetta C2 (VX577), which was one of only three Valettas in existence. The Valletta's restoration work had taken two years and was completed the previous summer.

A military vehicle collection previously displayed in Newcastle upon Tyne began relocation to the museum's new large Romney hut in early 2012. This addition resulted in the name change of the facility to its present name, North East Land, Sea and Air Museums.

The North Eastern Electrical Traction Trust (NEETT) moved trams and buses to a new tram shed on the site in April 2013. It was completed and track installed in December 2013.

== Collection ==
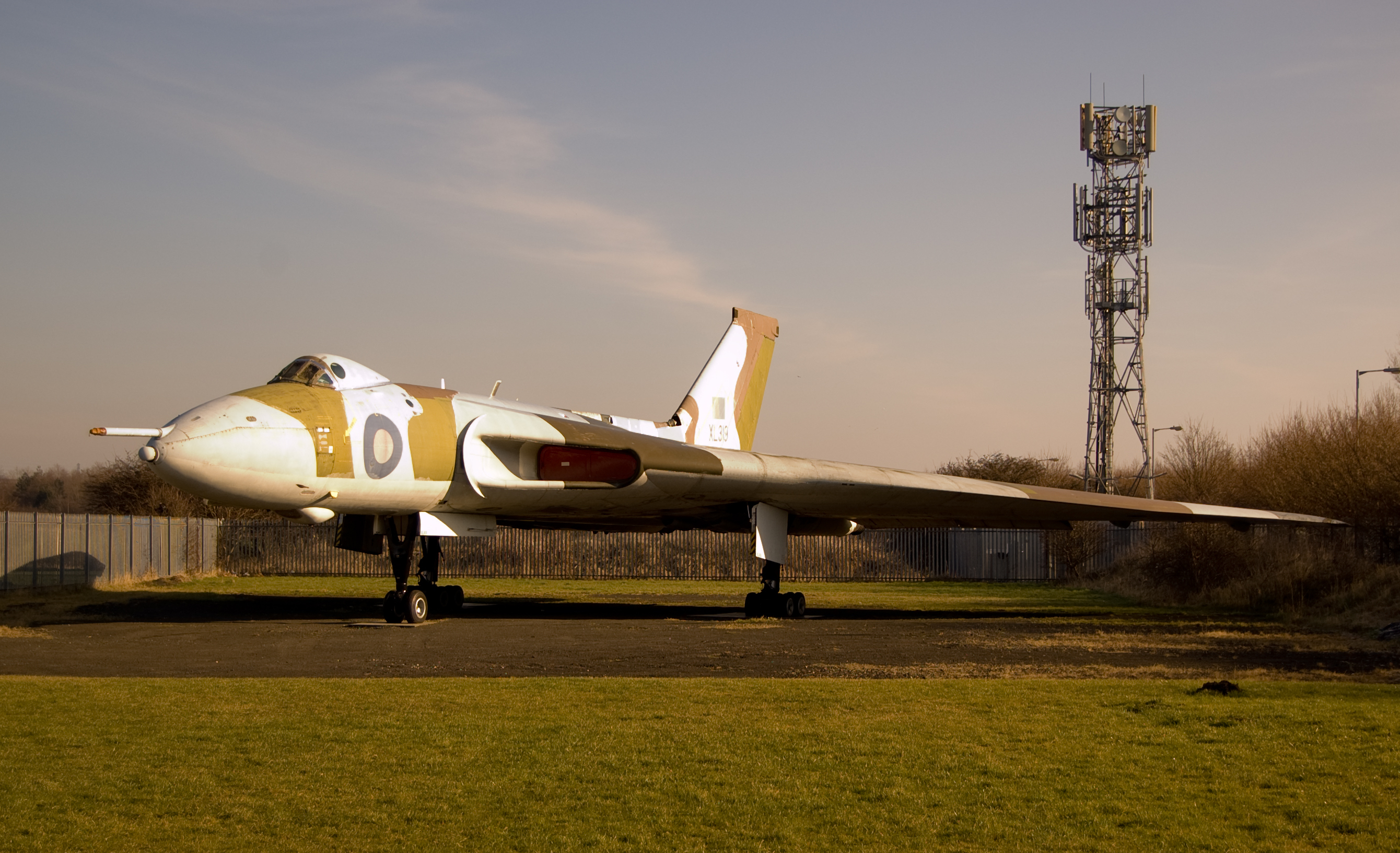
Avro Vulcan B.2, XL319 on display at the museum.

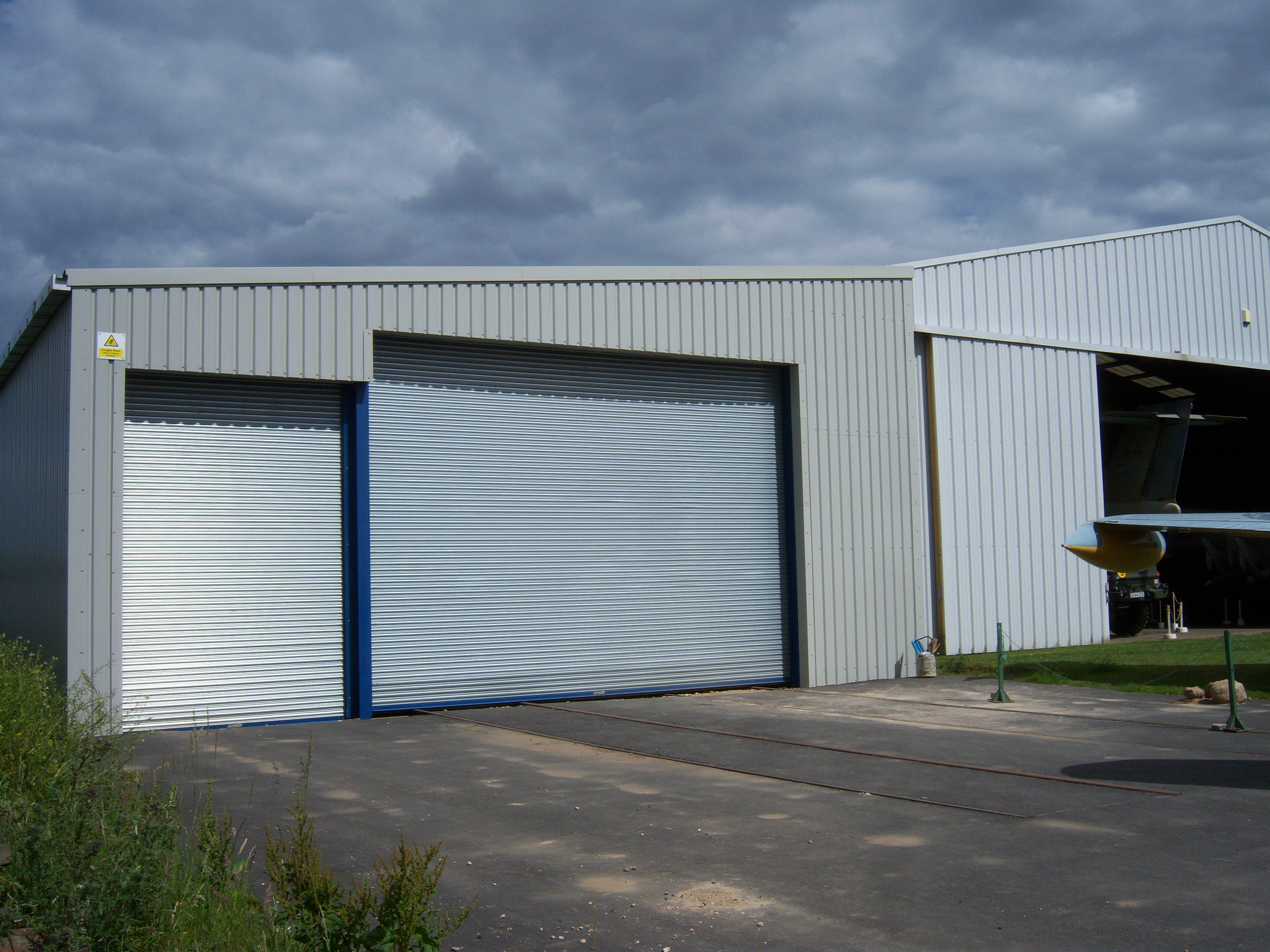
Tram shed, 2015

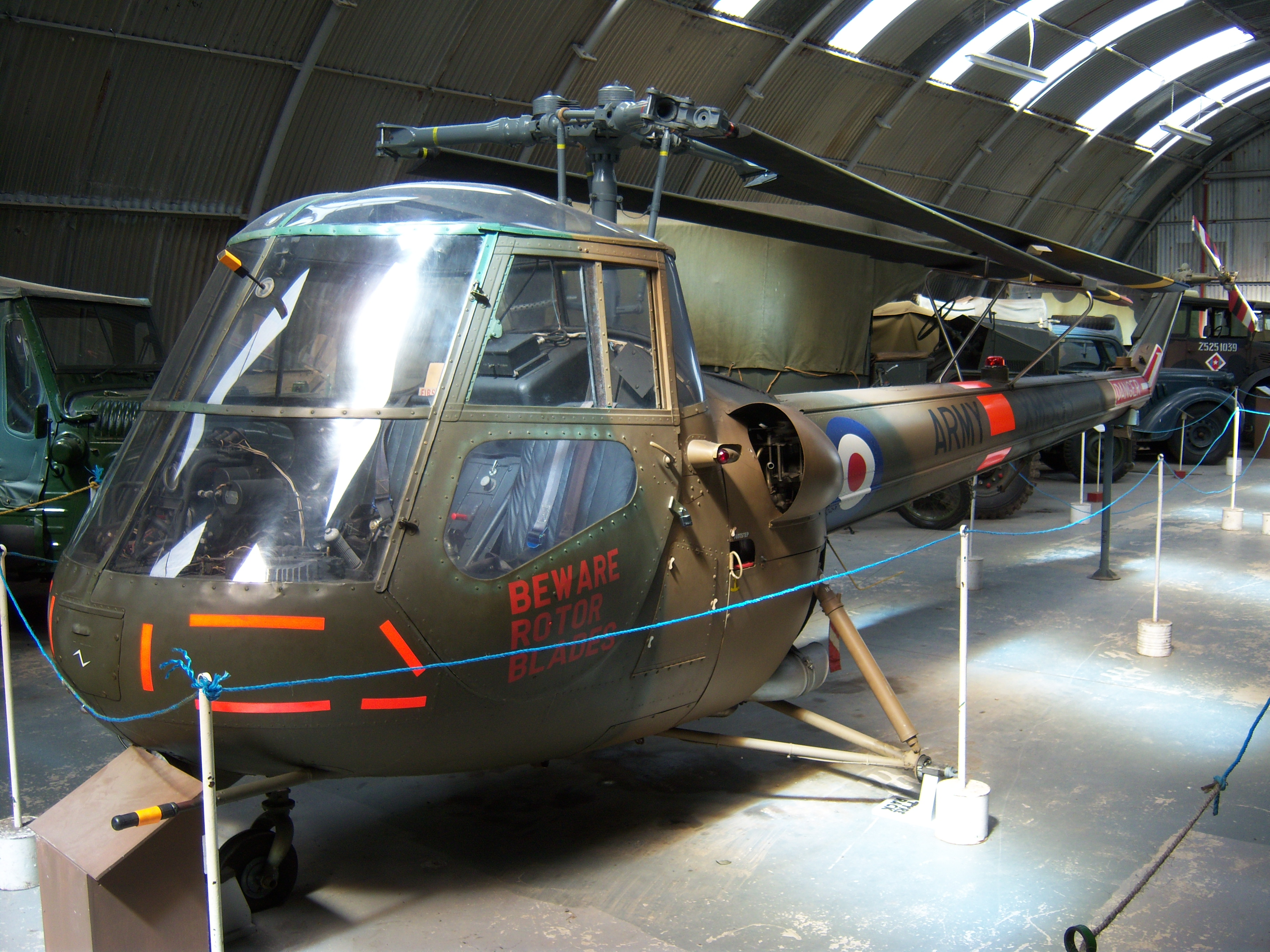
Saro Skeeter at the museum

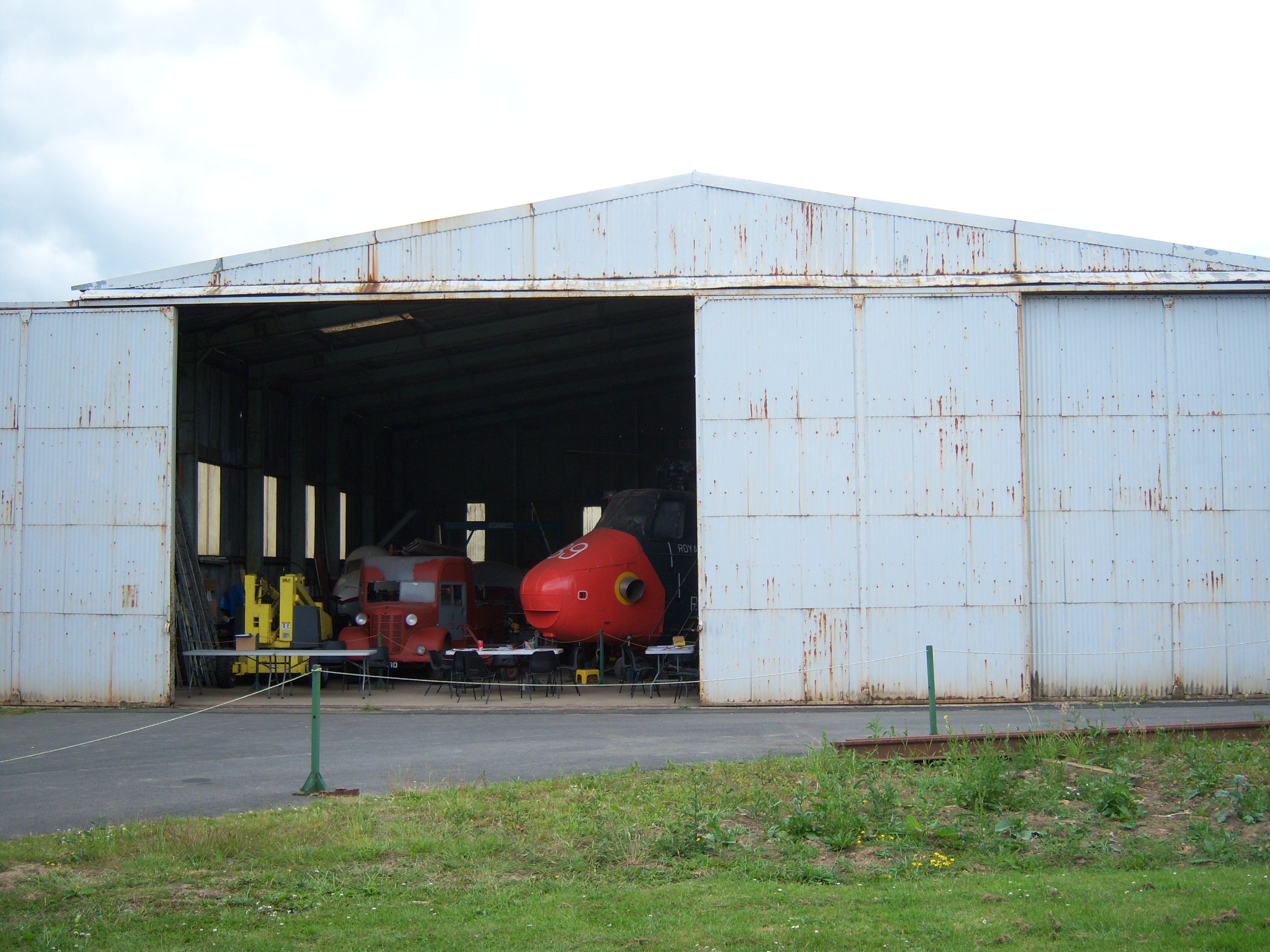
Admiralty Type S Hangar, 2015

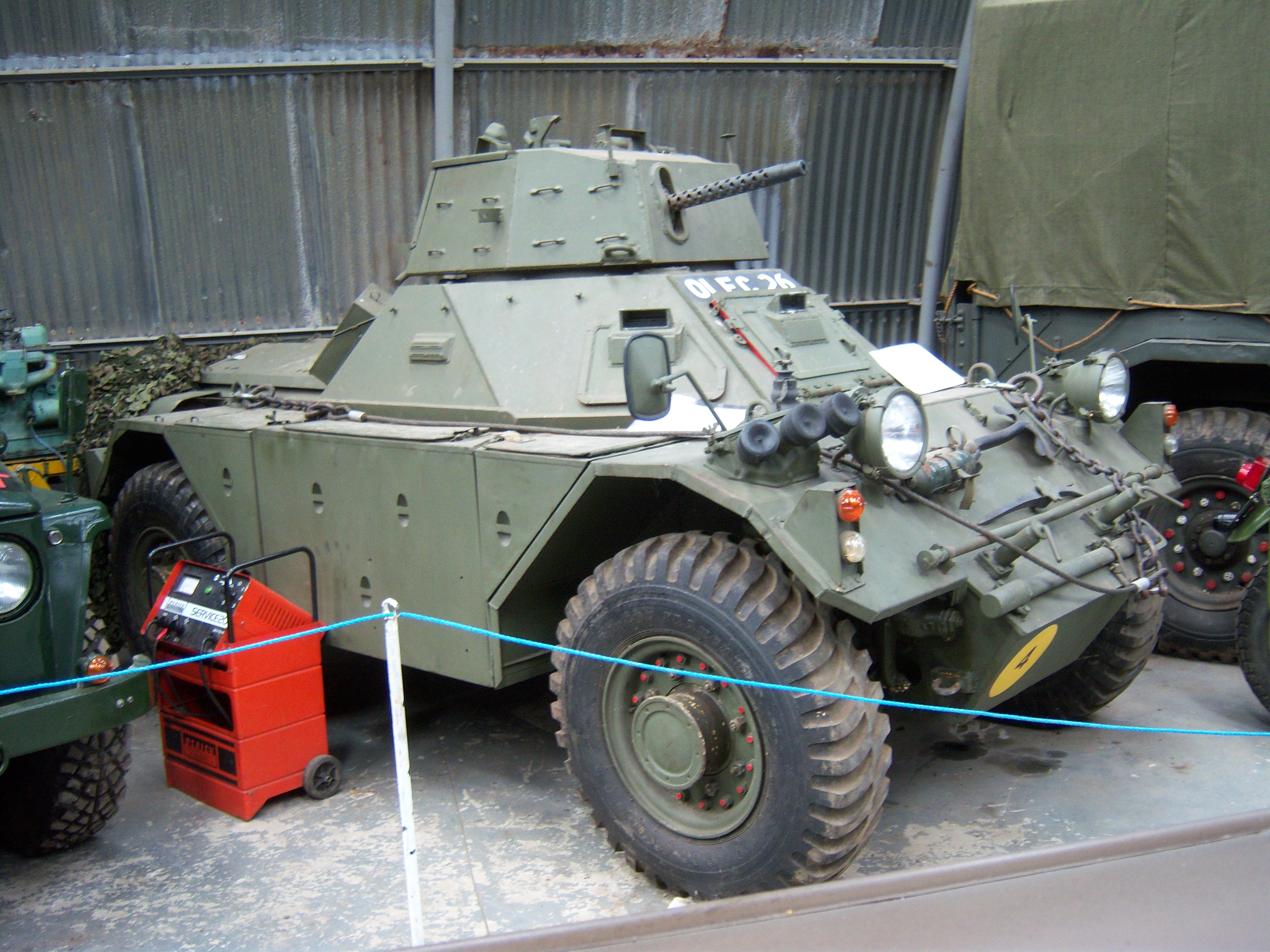
Daimler Mk.2 Ferret at the museum, 2015

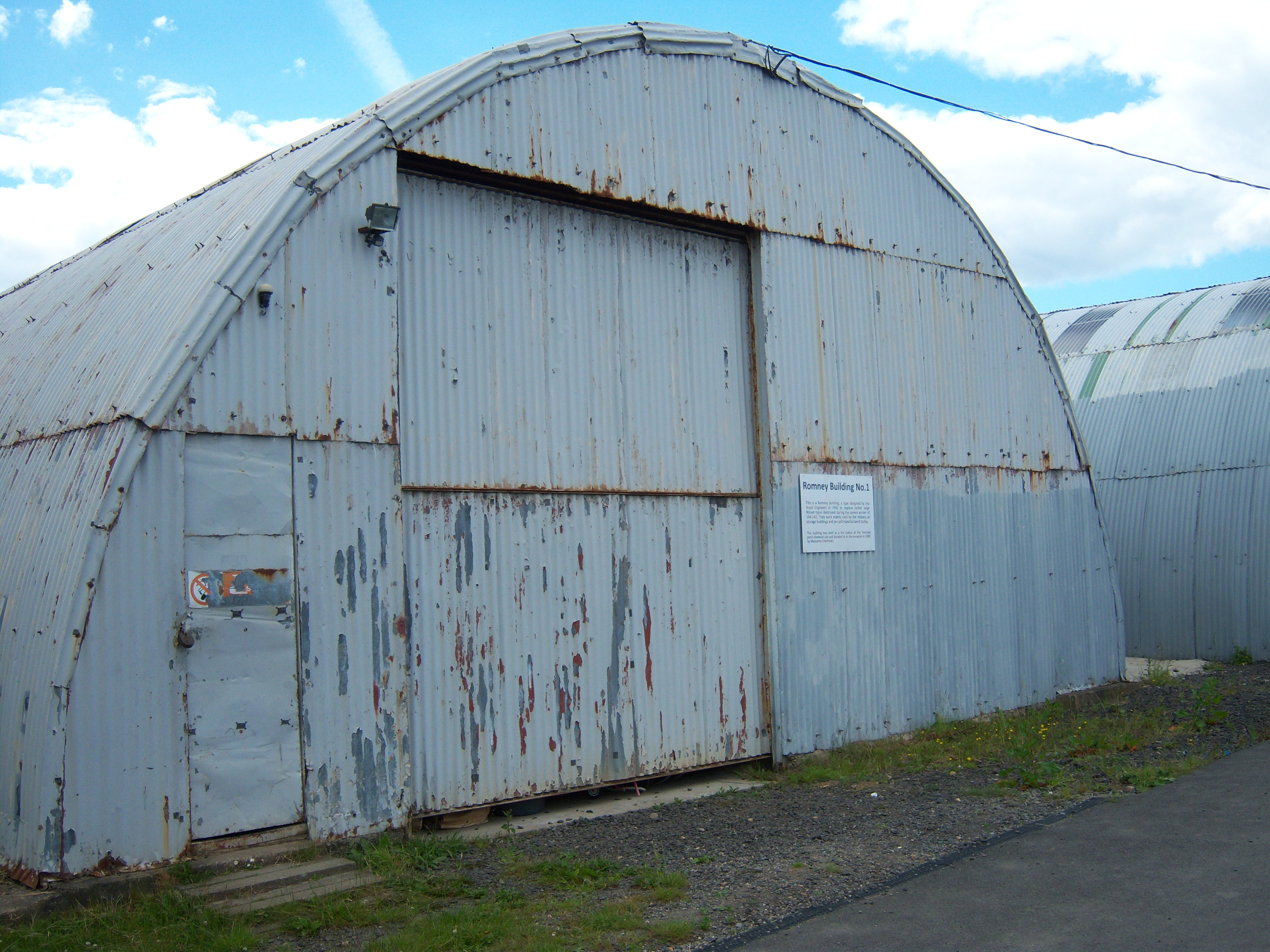
Romney Building No. 1, 2015

The museum's collection includes:

=== Aircraft ===
- AES Lone Ranger, G-MBDL
- Auster J1N Alpha, G-APKM
- Avro Anson C.19, TX213/G-AWRS
- Avro Vulcan B.2, XL319
- BAC Jet Provost T.4, XP627
- Bensen B-7, BAPC.119
- Bristol Sycamore Mk.3, WA577
- Brown Helicopter, BAPC.96
- De Havilland Comet 4C, G-BEEX/SU-ALM (nose only)
- De Havilland Canada Chipmunk T.10, WB685
- De Havilland Sea Venom FAW.22, XG680
- De Havilland Sea Vixen (nose only)
- De Havilland Vampire T.11, WZ518
- English Electric Canberra TT.18, WJ639
- English Electric Lightning F.53, ZF594
- FMA Pucara
- Gloster Meteor F.8, WL181
- Hawker Hunter F.51, E-419
- Hawker Hurricane replica
- Hawker Siddeley Trident 1C, G-ARPO (Save the Trident Group)
- Handley Page Jetstream (nose only)
- Luton Major, G-ARAD
- Luton Minor, G-AFUG
- Mignet HM.14 "Flying Flea", G-ADVU
- Morane Saulnier Type N "Bullet"
- North American F-86D Sabre, 6171
- North American F-100D Super Sabre, 4215757
- Republic F-84F Thunderstreak, 6541
- Saunders-Roe Skeeter AOP.12
- Short SD-330, G-OGIL
- Slingsby Cadet TX3, WT913 with wings from WT917
- Slingsby Grasshopper TX.1, WZ747
- Supermarine Spitfire replica
- Westland Dragonfly HR.5, WG724
- Westland Gazelle, G-BAGJ
- Westland Sioux AH.1, XT148
- Westland Widgeon, G-APTW (This aircraft was used in the film; When Eight Bells Toll)
- Westland Whirlwind, XN258

=== Aero Engines ===
- Alvis Leonides
- Bristol Hercules
- De Havilland Goblin
- Junkers Jumo
- Junkers Jumo 211
- Rolls-Royce Gnome
- Rolls-Royce Merlin

=== Buses, transport and trains ===
- Blackpool/Metro Cammell Twin Set tram
- British United Traction trolley bus
- East Lancashire Coachbuilders of Blackburn Centenary Car
- English Electric Balloon tram
- Leyland Lynx single decker bus
- Volvo Olympian bus, two examples
- Tyne and Wear Metrocar 4020 (Platinum Jubilee of Elizabeth II sticker)

=== Military vehicles and equipment ===
- Abbot FV433 SPG
- Alvis Saladin FV601
- Alvis Salamander airfield fire engine
- Alvis Saracen Mk.1 armoured personnel carrier
- Alvis FV101 Scorpion armoured reconnaissance vehicle
- Austin K2 fire fighting heavy pump unit
- Bedford RLHZ Green Goddess fire engine
- Bofors 40mm Anti-Aircraft Gun
- Daimler Mk.2 Ferret armoured scout car
- Dennis Specialist Vehicles F12 fire engine
- GKN Sankey FV432 APC
- Land Rover
- Mk.II 25 Pounder Field Gun
- Morris Commercial C8/AT Mk III
- Ordnance Factory L4 120mm Recoil-less Rifle Mobat
- Vickers aircraft tractor aircraft carrier deck tug
- Vickers Squeezebore anti-tank vehicle

== See also ==
- List of aerospace museums
- List of museums in Tyne and Wear
- List of transport museums
