= ComputerTown UK =

In the November 1980 issue of the UK's Personal Computer World (PCW magazine), there was an article written by David Tebbutt, about his visit to the Menlo Park Library where the "ComputerTown USA!" a self-help computer literacy movement, started by the People's Computer Company, was based. That article and the regular CTUK column/page in future issues of PCW in turn sparked a widespread UK based self-help computer literacy movement, called "ComputerTown UK!". Within a few months over 20 local groups sprang up. ^{(See CTUSA! Newsletter Issue 18 Vol 3 No 5 Sept/Oct 1982)}

The idea behind the groups was that members of the public took their own personal computers into public places for the general public to see and use. Several of these CTUK groups gave birth to local amateur computer clubs, some of which are continued operating into the 21st Century.

An example of such a group was 'ComputerTown North East' (Newcastle-upon-Tyne & Gateshead) which met in the Tyne & Wear Science Museum cafe (and thus could claim to be the first ever cyber-cafe on Tyneside). They also held "awareness days" in the Newcastle Central Public Library, and in many other local branch libraries on Tyneside, and in Gateshead, South Shields and Sunderland between 1981 and 1990.

"Log-on-the-Tyne" was a FidoNet Computer Bulletin Board, ran from 1985 to 1995, by John Bone & Steven Townsley, with help from John Rawson and others. A dial-up modem service, with email via the FidoNet network, all operated by volunteers in their own time. {Its one time Fido ID being "FidoNet 2:256/17.0"}

== See also ==
Users' group
