= Coble =

Type of traditional fishing boat

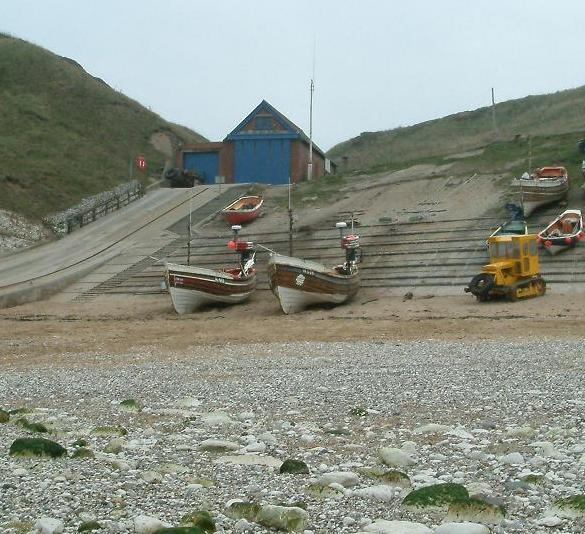
Three cobles at North Landing, Flamborough Head

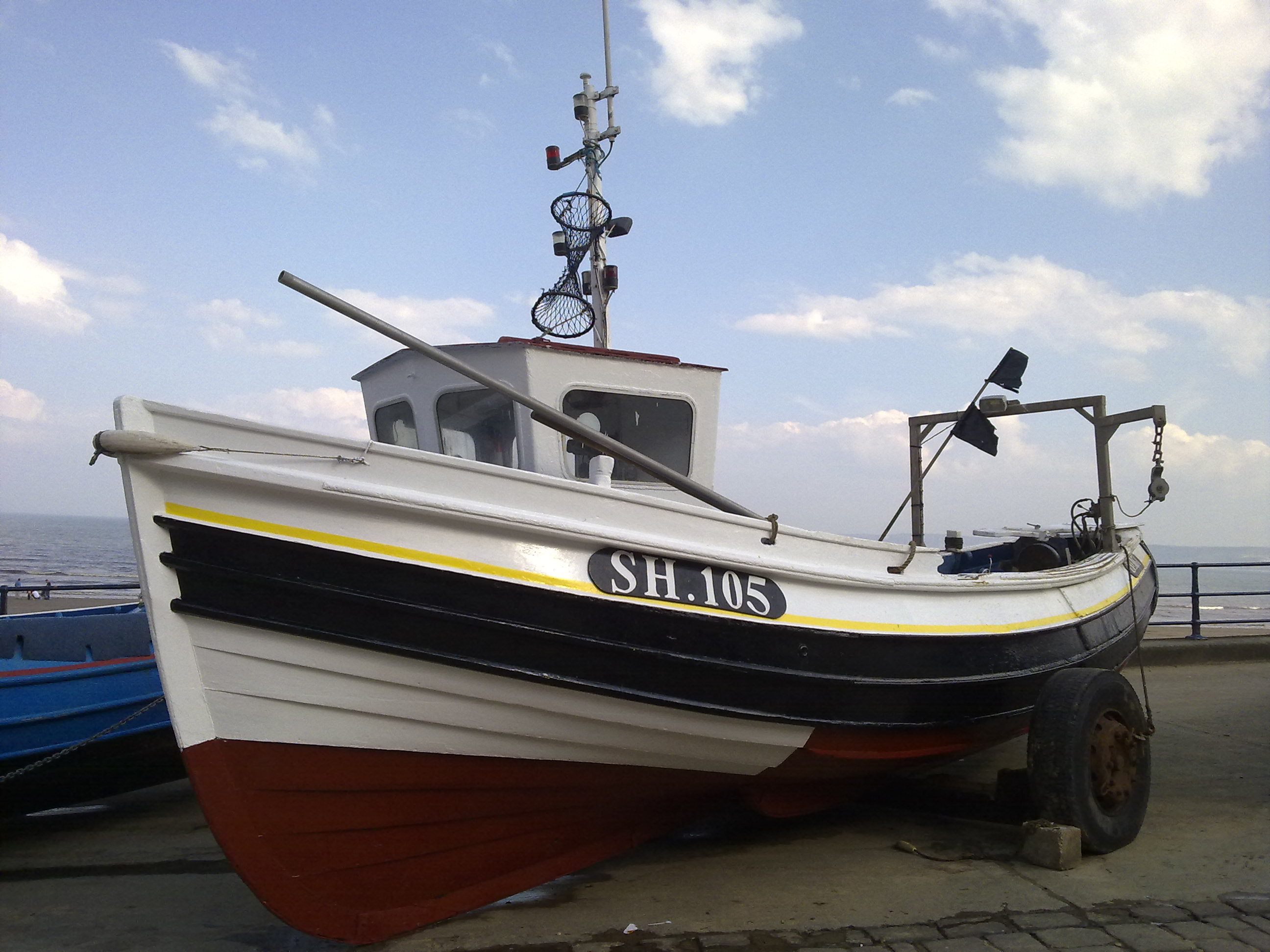
Coble on Filey Coble Landing

The coble is a type of open traditional fishing boat which developed on the North East coast of England. The southernmost examples occur around Hull (although Cooke drew examples at Yarmouth, see his Shipping and Craft series of drawings of 1829); the type extends to Burnmouth just across the Scottish border.

The distinctive shape of the boat — flat-bottomed and high-bowed — arose to cope with the particular conditions prevalent in this area. Flat bottoms allowed launching from and landing upon shallow, sandy beaches; an advantage in this part of the coast where the wide bays and inlets provided little shelter from stormy weather. However, fishermen required high bows to sail in the dangerous North Sea and in particular to launch into the surf and to land on the beaches. The design contains relics of Norse influence, though in the main it shows Dutch origin.

A Scottish version of the coble, much shallower and beamier than the English type, serves for salmon-fishing off beaches near Arbroath and Montrose in Angus. These cobles have a less refined construction than their southern counterparts. Ghillies employ a smaller, better-built version for fly fishing on Scottish rivers.

Local boat-builders constructed the clinker-built cobles locally as required, without the use of plans. The craftsmanship on many boats gave them a long working life. They had a reputation as dangerous to sail for an inexperienced crew, but in the hands of experts could move both safely and speedily.

Today, surviving cobles generally use diesel engines, removing the need for the distinctively shaped lug sail. In a further concession to comfort, a tarpaulin shelter often covers the bow.

The Northumberland coastal village of Newbiggin-by-the-Sea has a pub called "The Coble" named in tribute to these boats. A park, Coble Dene, in nearby North Shields is likewise named after the vessel.

== See also ==
- Redcar
- Staithes
- Foyboat
- Scottish east coast fishery
