= North East Coast Exhibition =

World's fair exhibition held in Newcastle upon Tyne in 1929

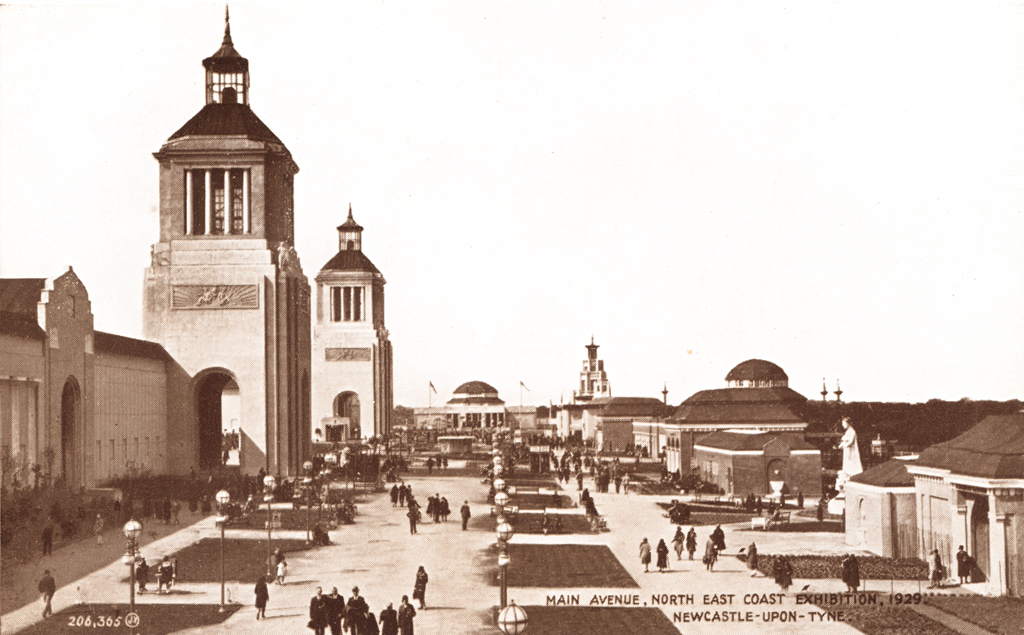
- Main avenue of the exhibition

Overview
- BIE-class: Unrecognized exposition
- Name: North East Coast Exhibition

Location
- Country: United Kingdom
- City: Newcastle
- Coordinates: 54.984°N 1.615°W

Timeline
- Opening: 14 May 1929
- Closure: 26 October 1929

The North East Coast Exhibition was a world's fair held in Newcastle, Tyne and Wear and ran from May to October 1929. Held five years after the British Empire Exhibition in Wembley Park, London, and at the start of the Great Depression the event was held to encourage local heavy industry.

== History ==
It was opened on 14 May by the then Prince of Wales (later Edward VIII) in what is now Newcastle's Exhibition Park. When it closed on 26 October over 4 million people had attended (with an average of 30 000 visitors per day)

Several buildings were constructed in an Art Deco style to the designs of the official architects W and TR Milburn of Sunderland who had substantial experience in the fields of theatre and cinema design. Henry Kelly Limited of Newcastle were the builder and construction costs were £114,000. The main buildings were the Palace of Engineering, the Palace of Industry, the Palace of Arts, the Festival Hall, Garden Club, a stadium of 20,000 capacity and the Women's and Artisans' sections. There was also an Empire Marketing Board Pavilion which was government sponsored and, unlike the other buildings, designed by government appointed architects.

== Legacy ==
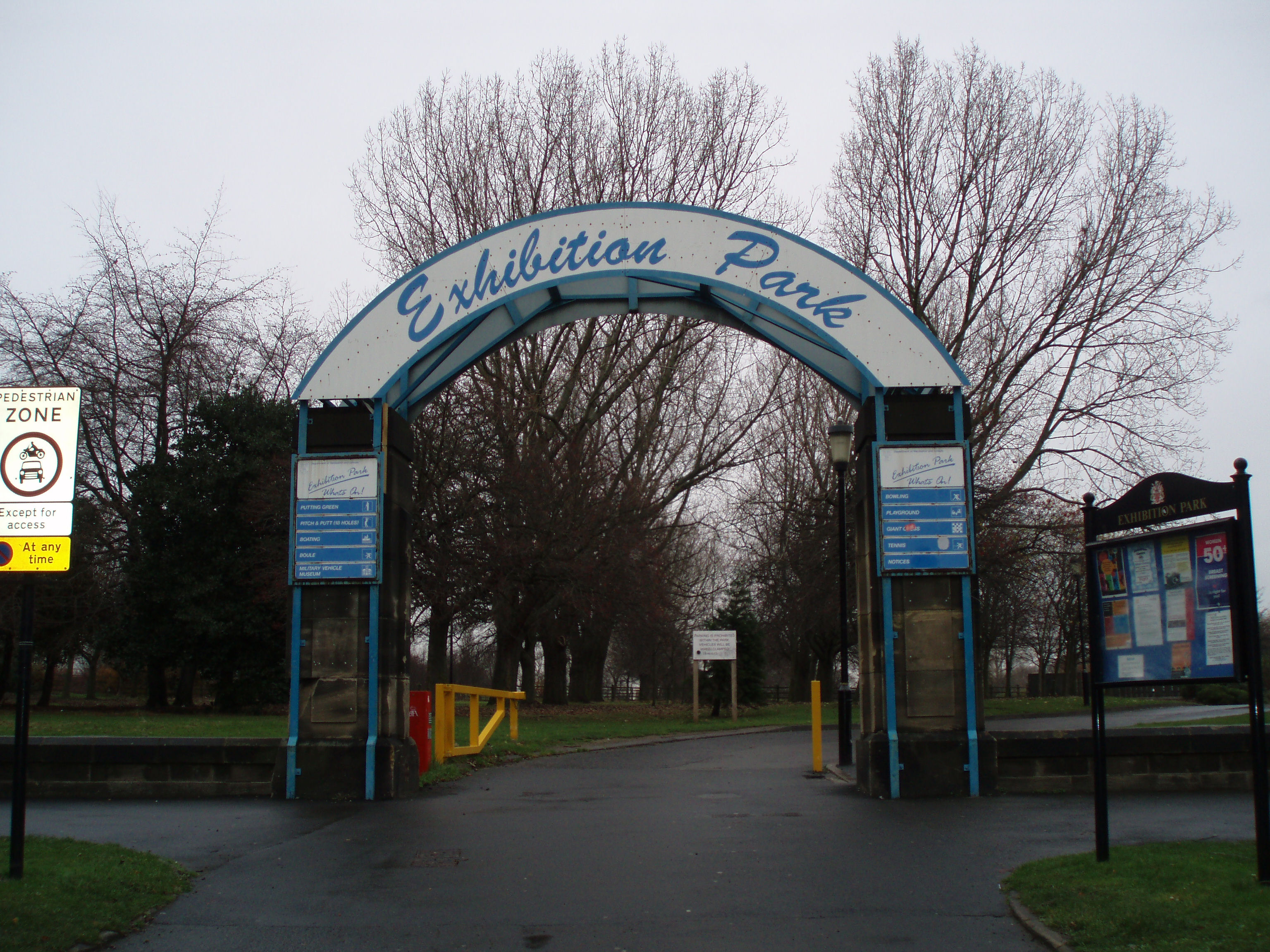
Entrance to Exhibition Park

The exhibition grounds are now a public park, the Newcastle's Exhibition Park used in the 1960s for the Tyneside Summer Exhibition. One of the art deco pavilions, a single storey steel framed concrete clad building, originally the Palace of Arts still stands, and is listed. After the exhibition it was used as a science museum, in the 1960s was part of the Tyneside Summer Exhibition and at one stage, extended to house the Turbinia (currently residing at the Newcastle Discovery Museum) and still later became the Newcastle Military Vehicle Museum in 1983 until it was closed in 2006, due to fears about the building's structural safety. It was put up for sale in November 2011. The building was purchased by Shepherd Offshore Ltd in 2012 with the intention that it would be used to house a carriage museum. This did not go ahead and planning permission was granted to Wylam Brewery in September 2015 to develop a micro-brewery and events space. £1.8m was spent on refurbishment and the venue opened in May 2016.

== See also ==
- British Empire Exhibition
