= North East Museums =

Regional group of United Kingdom museums

North East Museums (previously Tyne & Wear Archives & Museums) is a regional group of United Kingdom museums and the county archives service located across the Tyne and Wear area of north-east England. They have been administered by a joint board of local authorities since the abolition of the Tyne and Wear Metropolitan County Council in 1986.

They receive financial support from the five local authorities they operate within and since 2012, Arts Council England. The service is one of those specified in the Designation Scheme administered by Arts Council England. In the past, the service received additional financial support from the Department for Culture, Media and Sport.

Since 2021, the director has been Keith Merrin.

On 26 November 2024 Tyne & Wear Archives & Museums rebranded as North East Museums

On 1 April 2025, three Northumberland venues were added to the list of nine existing managed venues.

== Museums ==
North East Museums are responsible for managing the 12 museums and galleries below and the county archives. They also share the use of the Regional Museums Store at Beamish Museum.

Museum	Location	Website
Arbeia Roman Fort and Museum	South Shields	Arbeia Roman Fort & Museum
Discovery Museum	Newcastle upon Tyne	Discovery Museum
Great North Museum: Hancock	Newcastle upon Tyne	Great North Museum: Hancock
Hatton Gallery	Newcastle upon Tyne	Hatton Gallery
Hexham Old Gaol	Northumberland	Hexham Old Gaol
Laing Art Gallery	Newcastle upon Tyne	Laing Art Gallery
Morpeth Chantry Bagpipe Museum	Northumberland	Morpeth Chantry Bagpipe Museum
Segedunum Roman Fort and Museum	Wallsend	Segedunum Roman Fort, Baths & Museum
Shipley Art Gallery	Gateshead	Shipley Art Gallery
South Shields Museum & Art Gallery	South Shields	South Shields Museum & Art Gallery
Woodhorn	Northumberland	Woodhorn Museum
Stephenson Railway Museum	North Shields	Stephenson Railway Museum

== Archives ==
Tyne and Wear Archives are based within the Discovery Museum.

== Gallery ==
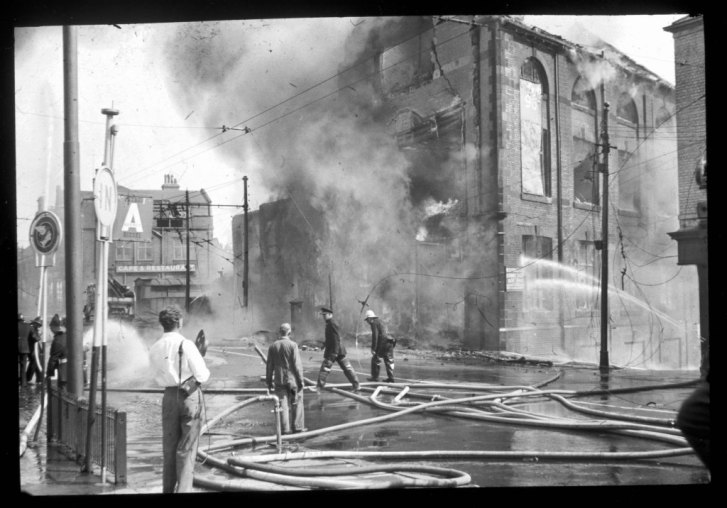
Shot of fire crews attending a blaze at 'Wesleyan Church Assurance Society' premises

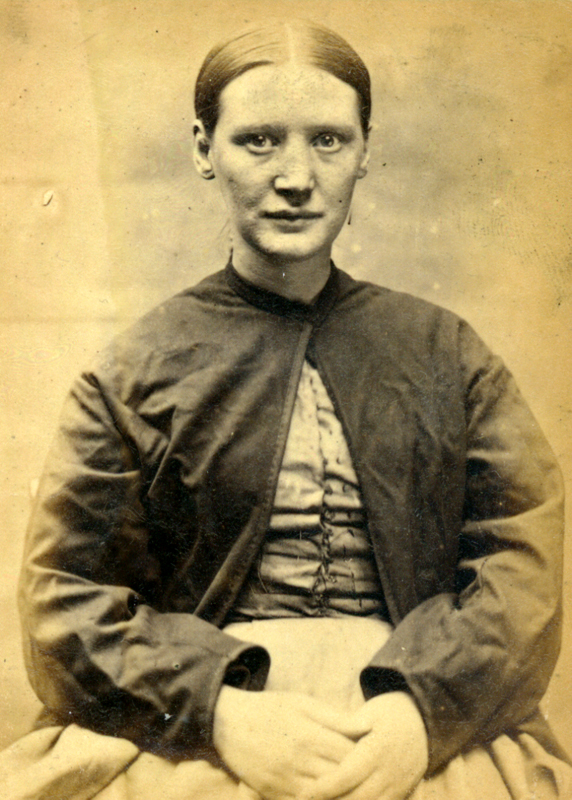
Agnes Stewart, convicted criminal in Newcastle between 1871 and 1873

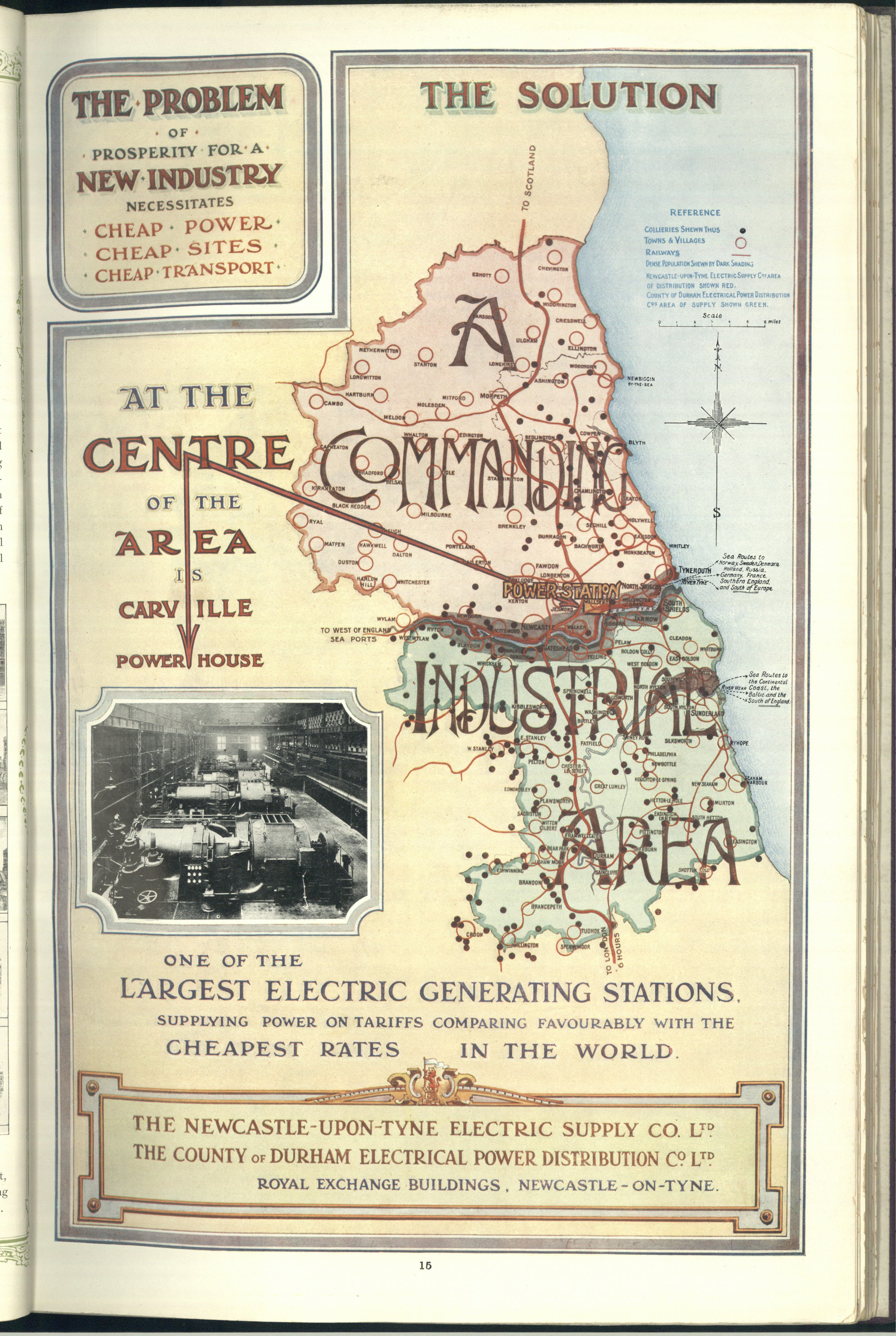
One of the objects within "A History of the North East in 100 Objects". A Power Station advert in 1908.

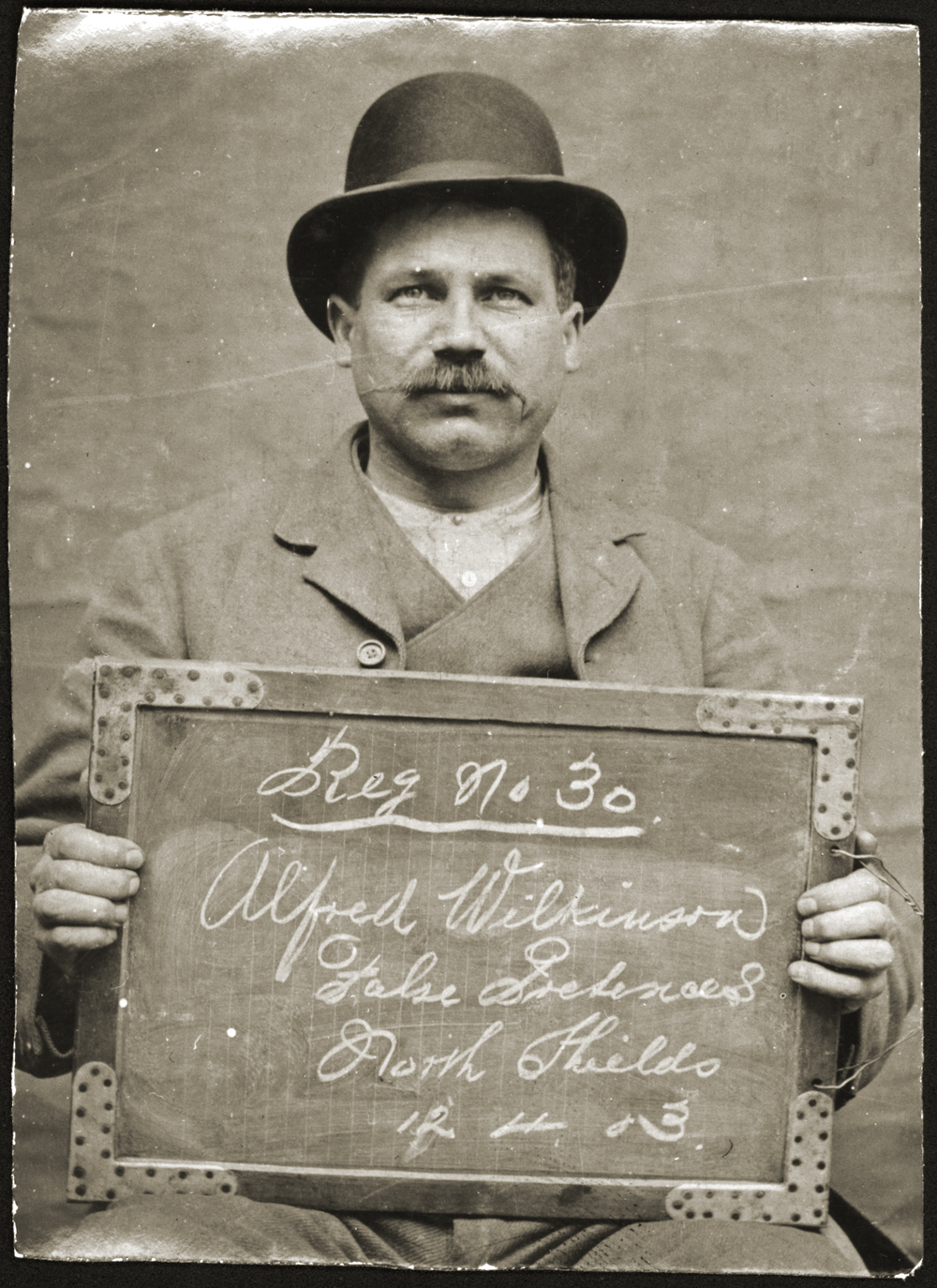
Alfred Wilkinson, arrested 12 April 1903 for false pretences.

== Cross Service Collaborative Ventures ==
Partnership between the museums and galleries both inside and outside of North East Museums has been a significant matter. One example is The Late Shows which has run every May since 2007. Another large-scale project has been "A History of the North East in 100 Objects" that launched in June 2013.

== See also ==
- ComputerTown UK (formerly based in the museum)
