= Discovery Museum =

Science museum in Newcastle upon Tyne, England

The Discovery Museum

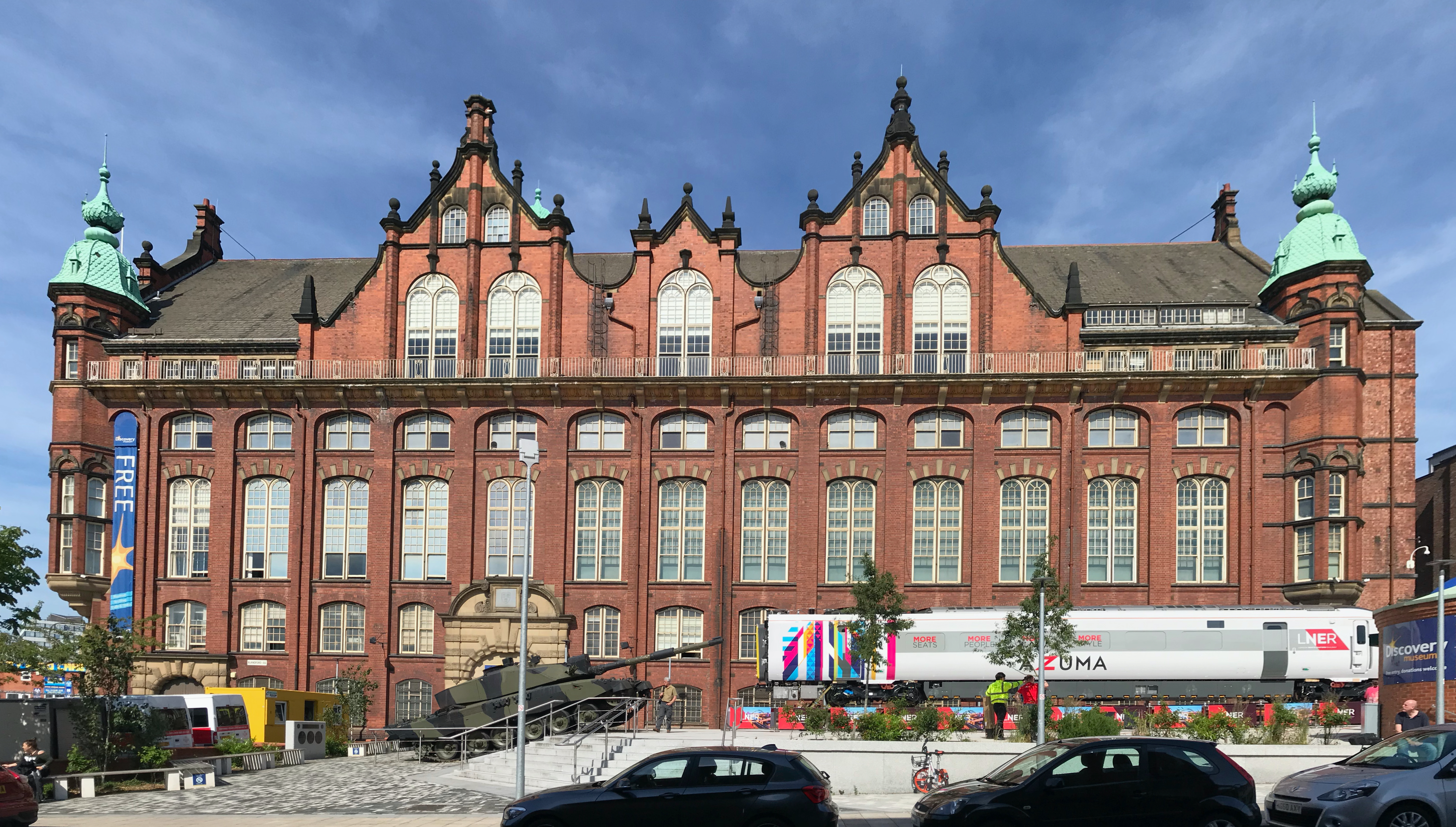
- The Discovery Museum in 2018

- Discovery Museum shown within Tyne and Wear; OS grid reference NZ240639
- Established: 1934
- Location: Newcastle upon Tyne, England
- Coordinates: 54°58′08″N 1°37′30″W
- Public transit access: Newcastle Central Station
- Website: Official website

The Discovery Museum is a science museum and local history museum situated in Blandford Square in Newcastle upon Tyne, England. It displays many exhibits of local history, including the ship, Turbinia. It is managed by North East Museums.

== History ==
The Discovery Museum started life in 1934 as the Municipal Museum of Science and Industry. The collections were housed in a temporary pavilion built for the 1929 North East Coast Exhibition in Exhibition Park, Newcastle.

The collections and displays grew for another forty years, until the temporary pavilion could no longer meet the museum's needs. In 1978, the museum was re-located to Blandford House, the former Co-operative Wholesale Society Headquarters for the Northern Region. Designed by Oliver, Leeson & Wood in 1899, the building had been the distribution centre for over 100 Co-op stores across the region, and contained extensive warehouse space and offices.

The museum was re-launched as Discovery Museum in 1993 at which time the Turbinia was moved from Exhibition Park. In 2004 the £13 million redevelopment of the museum was complete and the following year the venue attracted 450,000 visitors.

== Exhibits ==
The museum includes Turbinia, the 104 feet 9 inches (31.93 m) ship built by Charles Algernon Parsons to test the advantages of using the steam turbine to power ships, which could go up to 34 knots (39 mph; 63 km/h). It houses the regimental museum for the Light Dragoons (and its antecedent regiments) and the Northumberland Hussars, exploring the human side of 200 years of life in the army. It is a "hands-on" museum designed to interest both children and adults. It also features examples of Joseph Swan's early lightbulbs which were invented on Tyneside.
