= Exhibition Park, Newcastle =

Public park in Newcastle upon Tyne

Exhibition Park
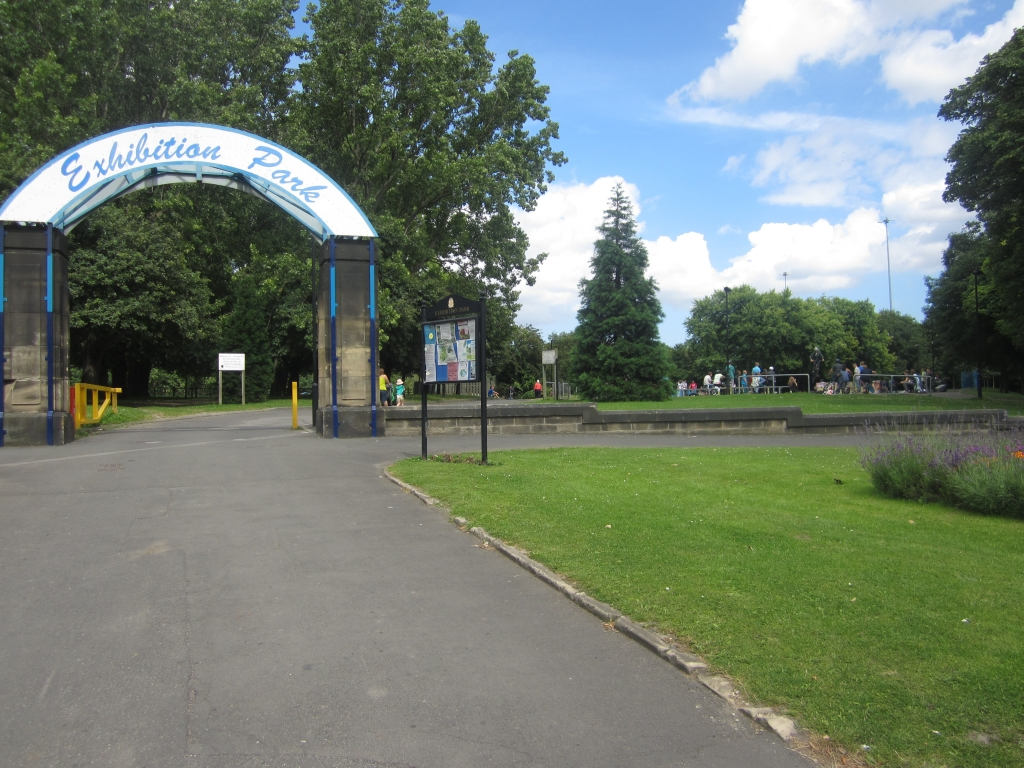
- Claremont Road entrance

- Location within Tyne and Wear
- Type: Urban park
- Location: Newcastle upon Tyne, England
- OS grid: NZ247657
- Coordinates: 54.985°N 1.616°W
- Designated: Newcastle-upon-Tyne Improvement Act 1870
- Etymology: Named for the Royal Jubilee Mining, Engineering and Industrial Exhibition of 1887
- Owner: Newcastle City Council
- Manager: Urban Green Newcastle
- Water: former boating lake
- Public transit: Haymarket Metro station; Haymarket bus station; Eldon Square bus station; Newcastle railway station
- Facilities: Café; Playground; Tennis courts; Croquet lawns; Bandstand; Brewery
- Website: urbangreennewcastle.org/find-your-park/exhibition-park

Exhibition Park is a public park connected to the south-eastern corner of the Town Moor, Newcastle upon Tyne, England. The park is home to numerous facilities including sports areas, a lake, playgrounds and a skatepark.

== History ==
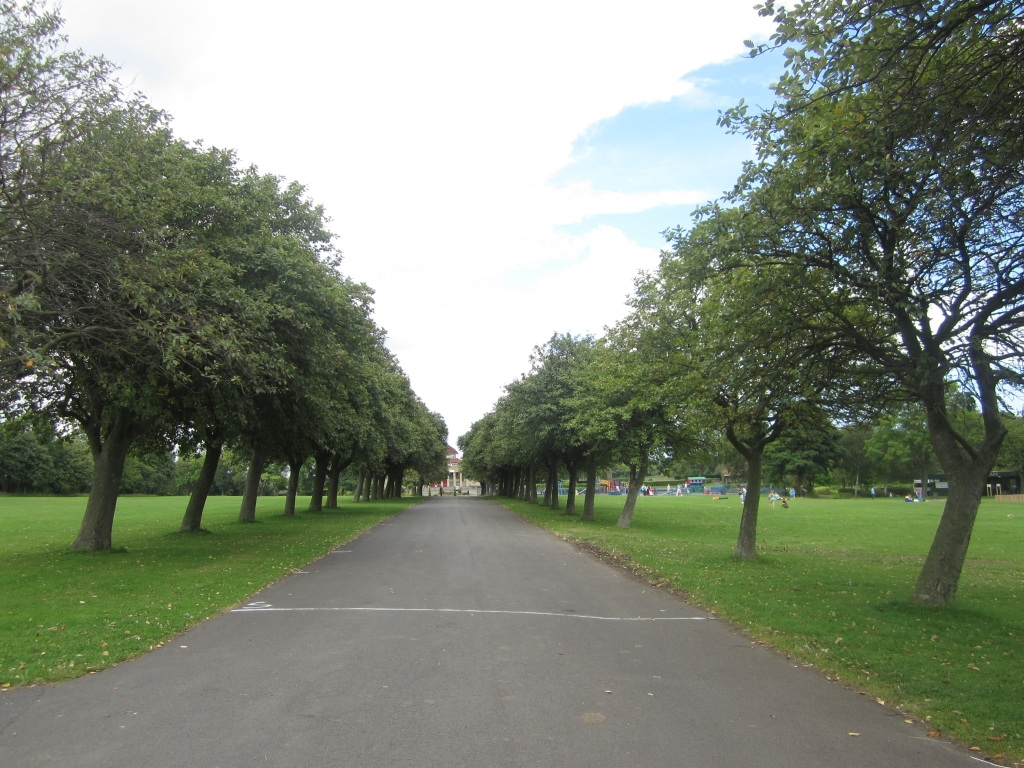
Tree-lined path in Exhibition Park

The Town Moor Improvement Act 1870 determined that two parcels of land, each of 35 acres (14 ha), would be developed for recreation. One would become Leazes Park with the other at the Town Moor. The original location of the park was to be the Bull Park where the City's bull was penned for stud. The site was the wedge of land at the corner of Claremont Road and the Great North Road. Later this land became the Hancock Museum. The committee realised that the Bull Park was too small for the Exhibition and requested Town Moor recreation ground. This is where the current park is now. The Royal Mining Engineering Jubilee Exhibition was held in 1887 and proved to be a tremendous success, attracting 2,000,000 visitors.

The name Exhibition Park was first used during the Jubilee Exhibition of 1887 but the old name of Bull Park remained for some time. The only remaining item from the 1887 Exhibition is the grade II listed bandstand, which dates from 1875.

=== The North East Coast Exhibition ===
This North East Coast Exhibition of Industry, Science and Art was held at the Exhibition Park from May to October 1929 and was opened by the Prince of Wales on 14 May 1929. It was a symbol of pride and industrial success of the region and at the same time an advertisement for local industry and commerce. The Palace of Arts is the only building still remaining in the park today from this exhibition.

- During 24 weeks operation a total of 4,373,138 people attended.
- Gold watches were given to each one-millionth visitor.
- Seven criminal offences recorded (six drunken offences and one pick-pocketing)
- It closed on 26 October 1929 with a fireworks display.

=== Museum of Science and Industry ===
Between 1934 and 1983, a science museum was located in the Palace of Arts in Exhibition Park. Due to lack of space, in 1983 the collections moved to the former Co-Op warehouse in Blandford Square, which later became the Discovery Museum.

=== Military Vehicle Museum ===
A military vehicle museum was then housed within the Palace of Arts, from 1983 until 2006. For a period of time, it continued to house Turbinia, the first turbine-powered steamship, which was moved to the Discovery Museum in 1994.

The city council put the building up for sale in 2011, declaring that it could no longer afford repairs. It was purchased by Shepherd Offshore Ltd who stated that they intended to create a collection of horse-drawn carriages and vintage vehicles. The planned opening date was Easter 2015. However, plans changed and the Palace of Arts now hosts Wylam Brewery, which opened on 27 May 2016.

=== Tyneside Summer Exhibition ===
This event began to be held by the city council in the 1960s, and attempted to capture many of the elements of the earlier exhibitions. It was last held in 1986, when a £60,000 loss was recorded.

== Exhibition Park today ==
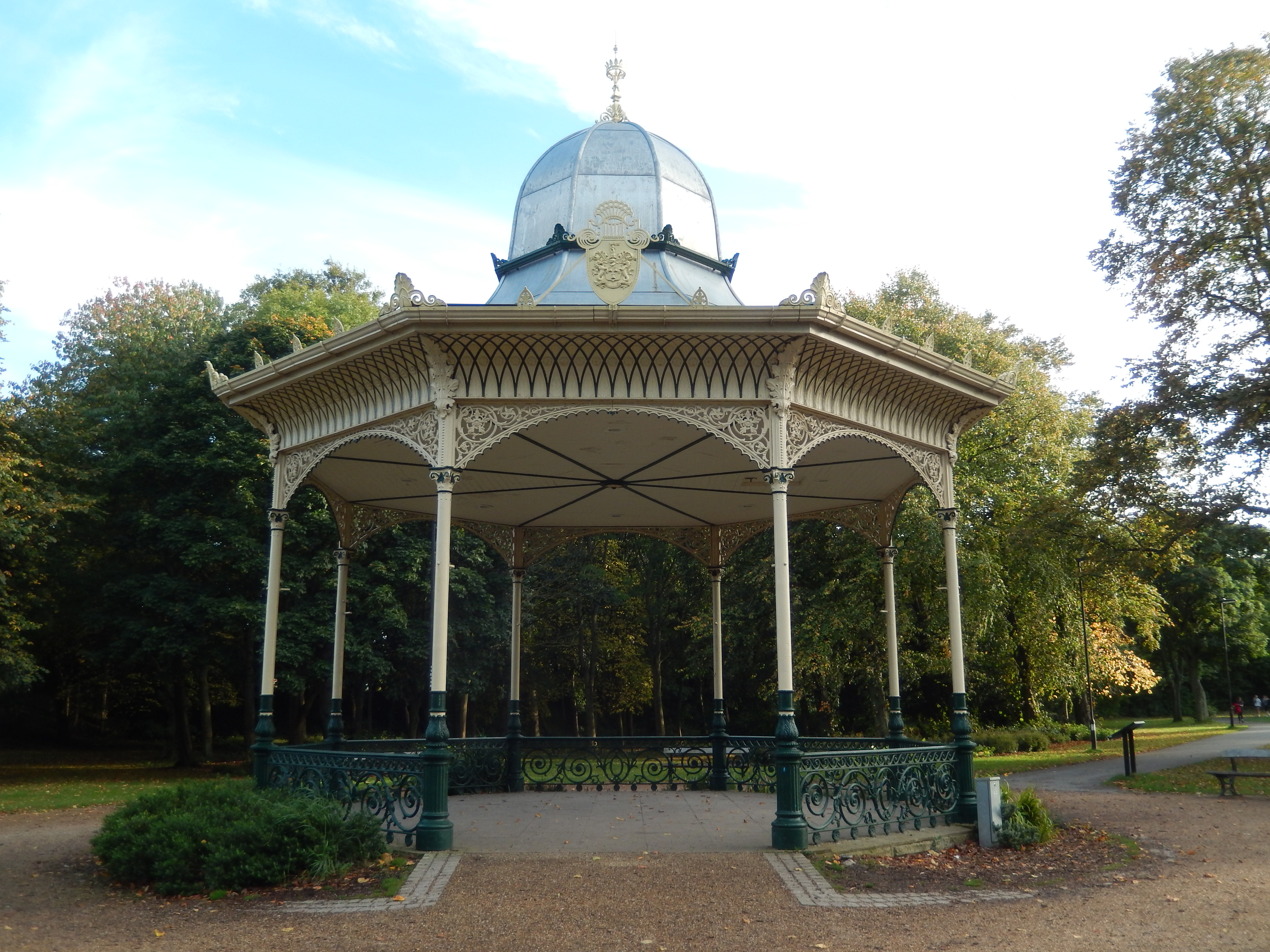
The Exhibition Park bandstand dates from the 1887 Jubilee Exhibition

=== Facilities ===
- There are two croquet lawns, two tennis courts and one basketball court.
- There is a fenced playground with safety surface containing swings, slides, climbing frames, spring toys and seating.
- A lake, recently redesigned to attract wildlife and improve water quality.
- A park café.
- A skatepark has been developed at the main entrance to Exhibition Park.
- The Tyneside Society of Model and Experimental Engineers (TSMEE) operates a miniature railway in the park.

=== Wylam Brewery in the Palace of Arts ===
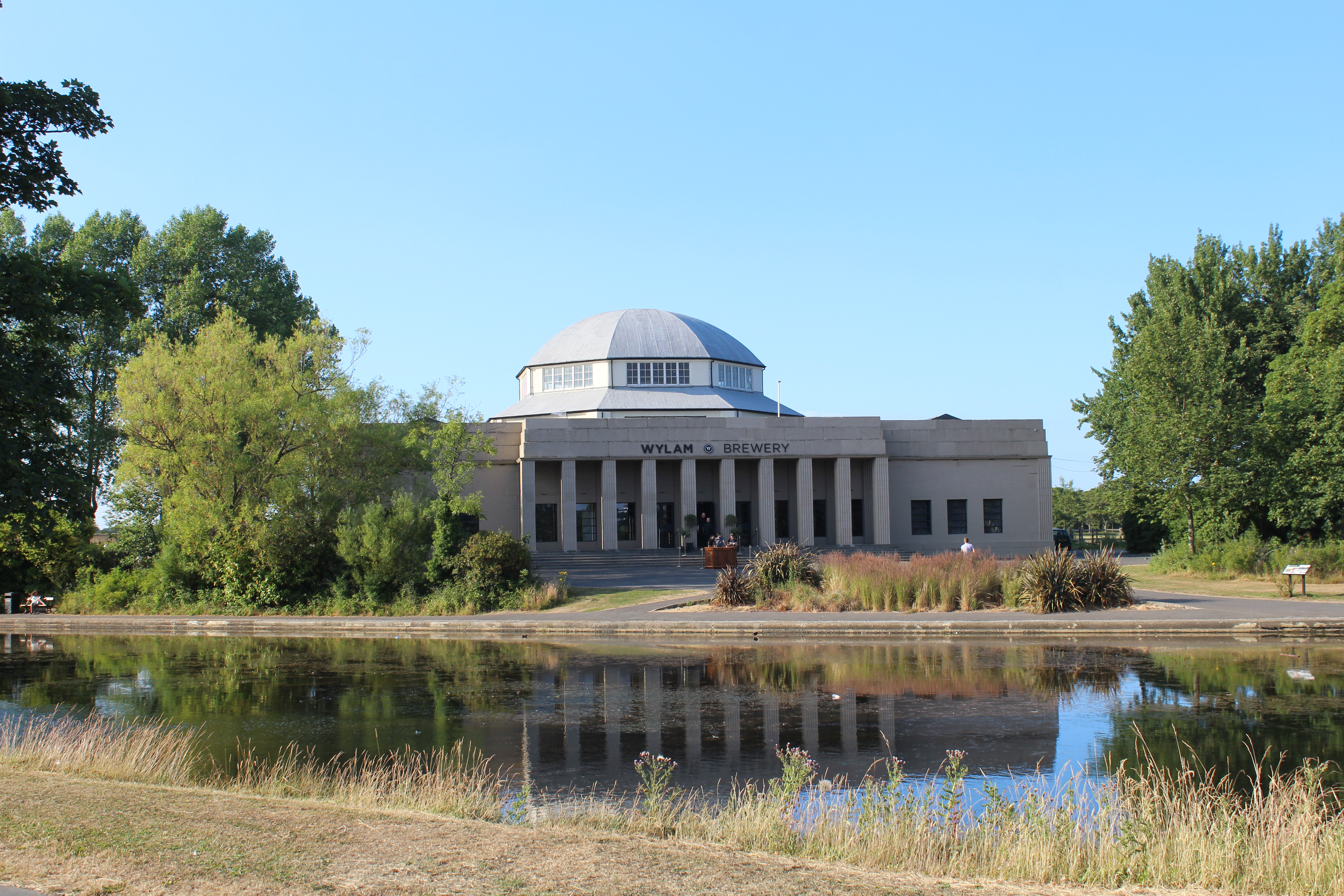
Wylam Brewery in the Palace of Arts, Exhibition Park.

Wylam Brewery started brewing at South Houghton Farm, Heddon-on-the-Wall, Northumberland in 2000. Dave Stone and Rob Cameron bought into the business in 2010, and soon realised that due to growing demand Wylam had to move site to realise its potential. The Grade II listed Palace of Arts was the last surviving building from the North East Coast Exhibition of 1929. It was still vacant after being refurbished by Freddy Shepherd, the former owner of Newcastle United F.C. and became the new home of Wylam Brewery in May 2016. Alongside the new brewery is a brewery tap, which is open four days a week, and the "Grand Hall" which hosts live music and events.

Wylam produces high volumes of US-inspired heavily hopped IPA's on its 50hl kit. It has engaged in collaborations with other craft brewers, such as Cloudwater, Magic Rock, Northern Monk and Thornbridge. Growth in keg beer, which accounts for 70% of its output, has seen Wylam reduce its cask selection to three permanent real ales. Head brewer Ben Wilkinson said the brewery has successfully managed to keep both sets of drinkers happy.

=== Events in the Park ===
- A mela (a celebration of Asian cuisine, music and art) has been held annually, over the August bank holiday weekend, since 1993.
- Northern Pride, an LGBT pride festival, is held annually, every July. In 2021, this event is scheduled to host UK Pride.

=== Refurbishment ===
Exhibition Park was restored by a £3million redevelopment programme funded by the Heritage Lottery Fund which had a projected completion date of late Summer 2014.

The refurbishment scheme included:

- Installation of a new children’s play area, which includes outdoor gym equipment.
- Traditional style railings and gates at the park entrance.
- A new skate park adjacent to the current one.
- New LED lighting in the underpass leading into the park.
- Resurfacing of the tennis courts.
- Restoration of the bandstand based on the original catalogue design.
- Reconstruction of the cafe with a new events/performance area adjacent.
- Engineering works to the lake to improve the environment and prevent flooding.

The park was officially reopened in July 2015.

=== Transport links ===
The nearest Metro and bus stations are at Haymarket and a taxi rank is located at Park Terrace near the park entrance.

== Bibliography ==
- Baglee, Christopher (1979). Linsley, Stafford (ed.). The North East Coast Exhibition of Industry, Science and Art, Newcastle-on-Tyne, May-Oct. 1929. Frank Graham for Newcastle City Council. ISBN 0-85983-175-2. OCLC 84969085.
