= Town Moor, Newcastle upon Tyne =

Historic Unenclosed Common Land in Newcastle

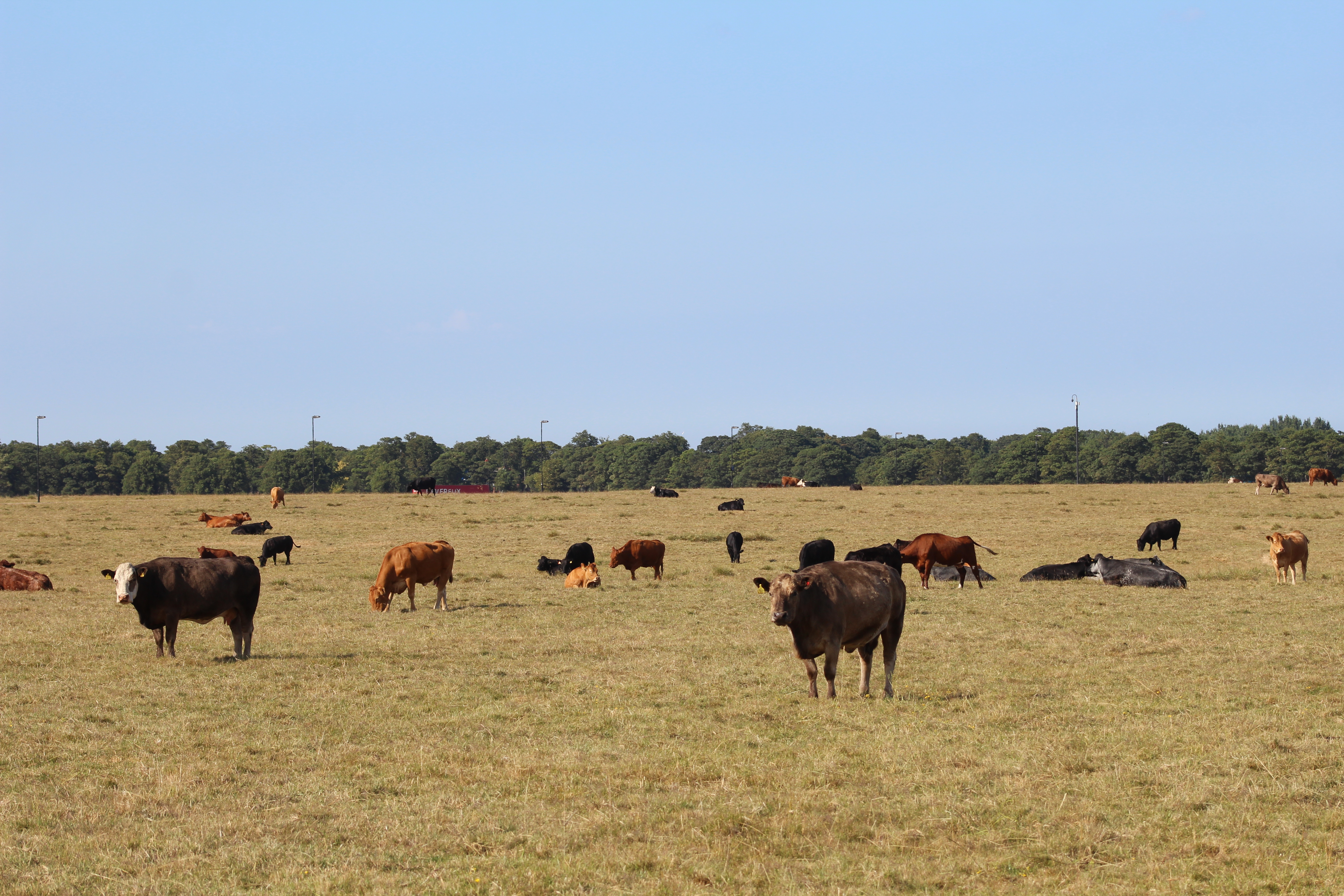
- Cattle grazing on the Town Moor
- Interactive map of Town Moor, Newcastle upon Tyne
- Type: Public park
- Location: Newcastle upon Tyne
- OS grid: NZ235664
- Coordinates: 54.992°N 1.633°W
- Area: 1,000 acres (404.7 ha)
- Created: 12th century
- Open: 24 hours
- Camp sites: No
- Hiking trails: No

The Town Moor is an area of common land in Newcastle upon Tyne in northern England. It covers an area of around 400 hectares (1,000 acres), making it larger than Hyde Park and Hampstead Heath combined. It is also larger than New York City's Central Park (300 ha (843 acres)). The Town Moor reaches the city centre to the south, Spital Tongues to the west, Gosforth to the north, and Jesmond to the east. Exhibition Park is adjacent to the southeast.

Freemen of the city have the right to graze cattle on the Town Moor. This right dates back around a thousand years or more, beginning an unknown time before the Norman Conquest of 1066, with ownership of the land probably formally granted by King John early in the 13th century. The number of cattle is not allowed to exceed 800; in 2021, around 600 were present. The rental income is distributed through the Town Moor Money Charity.

The ornithologist and landscape architect John Hancock, after whom the nearby Hancock Museum is named, produced a planned layout for the Town Moor in 1868, which was only partly realised.

The area of common land is split into several sections, of which the main Town Moor is the major part. The area is intersected by the A189 road, with the section on the northwest side of the road known as Nuns Moor; this includes the Newcastle United Golf Club. Also part of Town Moor are Dukes Moor and Little Moor, both on the northeastern side of the A189, Hunters Moor to the west, and Castle Leazes Moor to the south.

The moor has recently had a pathway relaid with more street lighting and CCTV.

== Sports and horse racing ==
In the 18th and 19th centuries the Town Moor has hosted a significant number of sports and recreational events including rabbit coursing, horse racing and running. In 1892 the Town Moor hosted a baseball event where Wallsend became the national champions.

The Town Moor first hosted horse racing events in 1721 and competed with races held at Killingworth Moor. The Town Moor's course was approximately two miles long, a triangular shape and located at the northern area of the moor, just south of Gosforth. Part of the course ran through a cutting which can still be seen in the grass at the north of the moor. In 1800 a permanent stone grandstand was built at the north end of the racecourse; a fire damaged it for a short time in 1844. The road in front of this grandstand is still called Grandstand Road to this day. From 1833 the Northumberland Plate horse race was hosted at the Town Moor. The Town Moor attracted the larger events than Killingworth, but by the summer of 1881 the Town Moor hosted its last race and racing moved to Gosforth Park that same year.

== Events on the moor ==
- In 1873 a political demonstration in favour of full male suffrage took place on the moor which attracted 200,000 people, the largest recorded mass gathering to have taken place there.
- The Hoppings, one of Europe's largest travelling funfairs, is held on the east side of the Town Moor every year, running for nine days (Friday to the Sunday a week later) finishing on the last Sunday in June.
- A mela (a celebration of Asian cuisine, music and art) is held annually over the August bank holiday weekend in the adjacent Exhibition Park.
- A Parkrun (5 km) takes place at 9 am every Saturday morning, and a junior Parkrun (2 km) for 4-14 year children at 9 am every Sunday morning.
- The Great North Run starts on the western edge of the Town Moor, and both competitors and spectators gather on the Moor to access the start. The 2021 race, with its route altered to facilitate social distancing during the COVID-19 pandemic, ended to the east of the Town Moor.

== Other uses ==
A Smallpox Isolation Hospital was built on the western side of Town Moor in 1882, and demolished by 1958. The site is still visible as a fenced linear copse or wooded area near the bottom of Cow Hill, the larger of the two hills on the west perimeter of the moor.

The Town Moor Aerodrome opened in June 1916 until 1932. On 8 April 1921 a hangar at the aerodrome was destroyed by arson by an Irish Republican Army team led by Edward Kerrigan, after they overpowered the airfield's night-watchman. Two aircraft were also destroyed.

== In culture ==
The Town Moor is mentioned in the Maxïmo Park song "The Undercurrents".
