= 2011 New Year Honours =

British royal recognitions

The New Year Honours 2011 were announced on 31 December 2010 in the United Kingdom, New Zealand, The Cook Islands Grenada, Solomon Islands, Tuvalu, Saint Vincent and the Grenadines, Belize, Antigua and Barbuda, Saint Christopher and Nevis, to celebrate the year passed and mark the beginning of 2011

The recipients of honours are displayed as they were styled before their new honour and arranged by the country (in order of independence) whose ministers advised The Queen on the appointments, then by honour with grades i.e. Knight/Dame Grand Cross, Knight/Dame Commander etc. and then divisions i.e. Civil, Diplomatic and Military as appropriate.

== United Kingdom ==
=== Knights Bachelor ===
- Peter James Bottomley. For public service.
- Martin Faulkner Broughton, Chairman, British Airways. For services to Business.
- Stephen John Limrick Bubb, Chief Executive, Association of Chief Executives of Voluntary Organisations. For services to the Voluntary Sector.
- Dr. David Edgeworth Butler, C.B.E., O.A., Fellow, Nuffield College, University of Oxford. For services to Political Science.
- Roger Martyn Carr, Chairman, Centrica plc. For services to Business.
- Professor Rory Edwards Collins, Co-Director, Clinical Trial Service Unit and Epidemiological Studies Unit, University of Oxford. For services to Science.
- Vernon James Ellis, Philanthropist and Chairman, English National Opera. For services to Music.
- Peter Brian Ellwood, C.B.E. For services to Business and to the Public Sector.
- Professor Michael John Gregory, C.B.E., Head, Institute for Manufacturing, University of Cambridge. For services to Technology.
- Ronald James Kerr, C.B.E., Chief Executive, Guy's and St Thomas's NHS Foundation Trust. For services to Healthcare.
- Richard Peter Lambert, Director-General, Confederation of British Industry. For services to Business.
- Professor Robin MacGregor Murray, Professor of Psychiatry, Institute of Psychiatry, King's College London. For services to Medicine.
- David Kennedy Newbigging, O.B.E. For voluntary service to Cancer Research.
- Professor Keith Macdonald Porter, Consultant, Royal Centre for Defence Medicine. For services to the Armed Forces.
- Anthony Gerard Redmond, lately Chairman, Commission for Local Administration (Ombudsman). For services to Local Government.
- Professor Alec Edward Reed, C.B.E. For services to Business and to Charity.
- Professor Lewis Duthie Ritchie, O.B.E., General Medical Practitioner and Honorary Consultant in Public Health. For services to the NHS in Scotland.
- Professor Adrian Frederick Melhuish Smith, F.R.S., Director-General, Knowledge and Innovation, Department for Business, Innovation and Skills.
- Professor Robert James Timothy Wilson, lately Vice Chancellor, University of Hertfordshire. For services to Higher Education and to Business.

=== The Most Honourable Order of the Bath ===
==== Knight Grand Cross of the Order of the Bath (GCB) ====
- Sir David Normington, KCB, Permanent Secretary, Home Office.
- General Sir David Julian Richards, KCB, CBE, DSO, ADC Gen. Chief of the Defence Staff, Ministry of Defence.

==== Knight Commander of the Order of the Bath (KCB) ====
Military Division

British Army

- Lieutenant General David Bill, CB

Royal Air Force

- Air Chief Marshal Simon Bryant, CBE, ADC, Commander-in-Chief, RAF Air Command.

Civil Division

- Stephen Charles Laws, CB, Office of the Parliamentary Counsel.
- Bruce Robinson, head of the Northern Ireland Civil Service.

==== Companion of the Order of the Bath (CB) ====
Military Division

Royal Navy

- Rear Admiral Amjad Mazhar Hussain
- Rear Admiral Bob Love, OBE

Army

- Major-General Gerald Berragan
- Major-General Timothy Inshaw
- The Venerable Archdeacon Stephen Robbins, QHC

Royal Air Force

- Air Marshal Christopher Mark Nickols, CBE
- Air Marshal Peter William David Ruddock, CBE
- Air Marshal David Walker, CBE, AFC

Civil Division

- Professor Brian Stanley Collins
- Yasmin Diamond
- Carolyn Downs
- Andrew Goudie, FRSE
- Andrew Fleming Hind
- Hilary Jackson, for public service.
- Mark Andrew Lowcock
- Una O'Brien
- Nigel Watkin Roberts Smith
- Peter Francis Unwin

=== The Most Distinguished Order of Saint Michael and Saint George ===
==== Knight Grand Cross of the Order of Saint Michael and Saint George (GCMG) ====
- Sir Peter Ricketts, KCMG, currently National Security Adviser to HM Government

==== Knight Commander of the Order of Saint Michael and Saint George (KCMG) ====
- Simon Lawrance Gass, CMG, CVO, H.M. Ambassador, Iran.
- Professor Eldryd Hugh Owen Parry, OBE, Trustee and Founder, Tropical Health and Education Trust. For services to healthcare in Africa.

==== Companion of the Order of Saint Michael and Saint George (CMG) ====
- Fleur Olive Lourens de Villiers, Chair, Trustees, International Institute of Strategic Studies. For services to democratic transition, reconciliation and governance in South Africa.
- Alan Doss, lately United Nations Special Representative. For services to the United Nations.
- Michael John Drury, Counsellor, Foreign and Commonwealth Office.
- Caroline Margaret Elliot, OBE, H.M. Consul-General, Shanghai, China.
- Simon Featherstone, lately Director, Shanghai Expo 2010, Foreign and Commonwealth Office.
- Thomas Fletcher, former foreign policy advisor to the Prime Minister
- Sandy Gall, CBE, lately Freelance Writer and Broadcaster. For services to the people of Afghanistan.
- Robert Winnington Gibson, Deputy High Commissioner, Karachi, Pakistan.
- Alistair Dewar Kerr Johnston, Non-Executive Member, Board of Management, Foreign and Commonwealth Office. For services to the Foreign and Commonwealth Office Board of Management.
- Andrew Lloyd, MBE, lately Director, Corporate Services, Foreign and Commonwealth Office.
- Trevor Steven Pears, Executive Chair of the Pears Foundation. For services to the community and UK/ Israel relations.
- Elizabeth Alison Platt, Non-Executive Member, Board of Management, Foreign and Commonwealth Office. For services to the Foreign and Commonwealth Office Board of Management.
- Rosemary Helen Sharpe, Counsellor, Foreign and Commonwealth Office.

=== Royal Victorian Order ===
==== Knight Commander of The Royal Victorian Order (KCVO) ====
- Sir Andrew George Buchanan Bt., Her Majesty's Lord-Lieutenant of Nottinghamshire
- James Cropper, Her Majesty's Lord-Lieutenant of Cumbria
- The Rt Hon. The Lord Shuttleworth; Chairman of the Council, Duchy of Lancaster, and, Her Majesty's Lord-Lieutenant of Lancashire.

==== Commander of The Royal Victorian Order (CVO) ====
- Commodore Barry William Bryant, RN, Director General, Seafarers UK.
- Sheena Carlin Cruikshank, Lord-Lieutenant of Clackmannanshire.
- Kenneth Alasdair MacKinnon, RD, Lord-Lieutenant of Argyll and Bute.
- Ian Donald McGregor, LVO, Deputy Keeper of the Privy Purse.
- Joseph McNally, formerly Trustee, The Duke of Edinburgh’s Award (UK).
- Robert Fraser Newell, LVO, Director General, The Royal Over-seas League.
- Helen Joanna Page, LVO, Lady in Waiting to the Duchess of Gloucester.
- Ashok Jivraj Rabheru, Deputy Lieutenant of Buckinghamshire.
- The Hon. William Shawcross, Author.

==== Lieutenant of the Royal Victorian Order (LVO) ====
- Colonel Richard Harold Graham, MBE
- Colonel Sir William Walter Mahon, Bt.
- Richard Francis Egerton-Warburton, AO
- Major Alastair Watson, Private Secretary to HRH The Duke of York
- Kathleen Williams
- Doctor Susan Margaret Kenyon Willmington, OBE, formerly Home Office.

==== Member of the Royal Victorian Order (MVO) ====
- Martin William Ashley
- Irene Louise Campden
- William Cathcart
- Richard John Carles Davison
- Timothy Mark Doncaster, RVM
- Mark Paul Flanagan
- Sergeant Danny Hill, for services to royalty protection
- Margaret Maran, for services to the Royal Collection
- Marion Louise McAuley
- Alexander Christopher de Montfort
- Briant John Pickett
- Julie Anne Sapsed
- Anthony Colin Shepherd
- Neil Alexander Wilson

=== Royal Victorian Medal ===
==== Royal Victorian Medal (Silver) ====
- Andrew Botto
- Constable Kenneth Wilson Coid
- Paul Denny
- David Gerald Hutchins
- Andrew Michael Jarvis
- Linda Eleanor Jones
- Roger David Williams

=== The Most Excellent Order of the British Empire ===
==== Knight Grand Cross of the Order of the British Empire (GBE) ====
Civil Division

- John Roundell, The Earl of Selborne, KBE. For services to Science.
- Arthur George, Baron Weidenfeld, Publisher. For public service.

==== Dame Commander of the Order of the British Empire (DBE) ====
Civil Division

- Patricia Bacon, for services to local and national further education
- Anne Begg MP, for services to disabled people and to equal opportunities
- The Lady Antonia Fraser, CBE, for services to literature
- Professor Caroline Humphrey, Lady Rees of Ludlow, for services to scholarship
- Felicity Palmer, CBE, for services to music
- Indira Patel, OBE, for services to human rights
- Professor Helen Wallace, CMG, for services to social science
- Harriet Walter, CBE, for services to drama
- Susan John, MA, for services to local and national education. Headteacher, Lampton School.

==== Knight Commander of the Order of the British Empire (KBE) ====
Military Division

Royal Navy

- Vice Admiral Richard Jeffrey Ibbotson, CB, DSC C021702Q.

==== Commander of the Order of the British Empire (CBE) ====
Military Division

Royal Navy

- Commodore Michael Peter Mansergh, Royal Navy, C025519N.
- Commodore Christopher Michael Howard Steel, ADC, Royal Navy, C023933K.

Royal Air Force

- Group Captain Jonathan Burr, OBE, DFC (5204316C), Royal Air Force.
- Group Captain Richard John Christopher Powell, OBE (8028043C), Royal Air Force.

Army

- Brigadier Michael Trevor Griffiths, late The King's Own Royal Border Regiment, 505972.
- Colonel Robert James Herring, late The Royal Logistic Corps, 517278.
- Brigadier James Ian Stuart Plastow, MBE, late The Royal Green Jackets, 507516.
- Colonel Christopher Robert Francis Rider, late The Staffordshire Regiment, 502757.
- Brigadier Christopher Linley Tickell, OBE, late Corps of Royal Engineers, 517325.

Civil Division

- Miss Evelyn Jean Selby Arnold, Deputy Director, State Pensions Policy, Department for Work and Pensions.
- Sheila, Mrs Audsley, lately Headteacher, Clifton Green Primary School, York. For services to local and national Education.
- Ms Kirstin Baker, lately Head, Financial Stability Team, H.M. Treasury.
- Francis Baron, OBE, lately Chief Executive, Rugby Football Union. For services to Sport.
- Rabbi Doctor Anthony Michael Bayfield. For services to British Reform Judaism.
- Professor John Benington. Emeritus Professor of Public Policy and Management, Warwick Business School. For public service.
- Professor Stephen Blackmore. Regius Keeper, Royal Botanic Garden Edinburgh. For services to Plant Conservation.
- George William Bolsover, Chairman, Aggregate Industries. For services to the Construction Industry.
- Dr Christopher Paul Hadley Brown, Director, Ashmolean Museum, University of Oxford. For services to Museums.
- Ian Arthur Brown, Managing Director, London Rail, Transport for London. For services to the Rail Industry.
- Joseph Brown, MBE. For services to Rock Climbing and to Mountaineering.
- Dr Lindsay Burley, lately Chair, National Waiting Times Centre Board. For services to the NHS in Scotland.
- Ravi Parkash Chand, QPM, Head of Group Equality and Diversity, Home Office.
- Christopher Samuel Gordon Clark. For services to the Academy of Culinary Arts.
- Keith Edward Frank Clarke, Chief Executive Officer, W. S. Atkins plc. For services to Engineering and to the Construction Industry.
- Andy Cole, Director Operations, Specialist Investigations, Bootle, Merseyside, H.M. Revenue and Customs.
- Professor Michael John Cooke, Chief Executive, Nottinghamshire Healthcare NHS Trust. For services to Mental Healthcare..
- Howard Cooper, Director of Children's Services, Wirral Metropolitan Borough Council. For services to Local Government.
- Leslie Thomas Cramp, Deputy Chief Executive, Insolvency Service, Department for Business, Innovation and Skills.
- Allison, Mrs Crompton, Headteacher, Middleton Technology School, Rochdale. For services to local and national Education.
- Doctor Peter Geoffrey Cullum, Chairman, Towergate Partnership. For services to Business and to Charity.
- Ian Mark Marshall Dalton, Chief Executive, North East Strategic Health Authority. For services to the NHS.
- Mark Damazer, lately Controller of Radio 4, BBC. For services to broadcasting.
- Stephen Howard Davies, Director. For services to drama.
- Dr Minaxi Sharad Desai, Consultant Cytopathologist and Clinical Director, Manchester Royal Infirmary. For services to women's healthcare.
- Ronald James Dobson, QFSM, Commissioner, London Fire and Emergency Planning Authority. For services to Local Government.
- Gerard James Patrick Eadie. For services to the Glazing Industry and to the Voluntary Sector in Scotland.
- Jason Feeney, Chief Operating Officer, Pension, Disability and Carers' Service, Department for Work and Pensions.
- Professor John Fisher, Professor of Mechanical Engineering and Deputy Vice-Chancellor, University of Leeds. For services to Biomedical Engineering.
- Dr Peter Fitzgerald, Managing Director, Randox Laboratories Ltd. For services to Business in Northern Ireland.
- Angiolina Foster, Director, Strategy and Ministerial Support, Scottish Government.
- Angela Jane, Mrs Frost, Director, Individual Customer Directorate, London, H.M. Revenue and Customs.
- David Stuart Frost, Director-General, British Chambers of Commerce. For services to Business.
- Professor Michael Gordon Fulford, Professor of Archaeology, University of Reading. For services to Scholarship.
- Professor Hugh Charles Jonathan Godfray, FRS, Hope Professor of Entomology, University of Oxford. For services to science.
- Farah Ramzan Golant, Executive Chairman, Abbott Mead Vickers BBDO. For services to the advertising industry.
- Howard Lindsay Goodall, National Ambassador for Singing. For services to Music Education.
- Edward Peter Gostling. For services to the Voluntary Sector.
- Dr Dennis Gunning, lately Director, Skills, Higher Education and Lifelong Learning Group, Welsh Assembly Government.
- Ali Hadawi, Principal, Southend Adult Community College. For services to Vocational Education in Iraq and to Further Education.
- Donna, Mrs Hall, Chief Executive, Chorley Borough Council. For services to Local Government in Lancashire.
- Professor Katharine Hamnett, Designer. For services to the Fashion Industry.
- Sheila Cameron Hancock, OBE. Actor. For services to drama
- Ronald David Harker, OBE, lately Chief Executive, Citizens' Advice. For services to the Voluntary Sector.
- Kenneth George Harvey, Chairman, Pennon Group plc. For services to the Utility Industries.
- Peter Richard Head, OBE, Director, Arup. For services to Civil Engineering and to the Environment.
- Professor Graham Henderson, Vice-Chancellor, University of Teesside. For services to local and national Higher Education.
- Joyce, Mrs Drummond-Hill, Head, Audit and Corporate Assurance, National Offender Management Service, Ministry of Justice.
- Professor Stephen T. Holgate, Professor of Immunopharmacology, University of Southampton. For services to clinical science.
- Professor Julian Meurglyn Hopkin, Rector for Medicine and Health, University of Wales, Swansea. For services to Medicine.
- Ms Sandra Horley, OBE, Chief Executive, Refuge. For services to the Prevention of Domestic Violence.
- Trevor Charles Horn, Record Producer. For services to the Music Industry.
- Ms Eileen Margaret Humphreys, OAM, Founder and International Director, Child Migrants Trust. For services to Disadvantaged People.
- Edward David Brynmor Jones. For services to Architecture.
- Lionel Joyce, OBE, lately Commissioner, Legal Services Commission. For services to the Administration of Justice.
- Dr Raymond Stuart Kelvin, Founder and Chief Executive, Ted Baker. For services to the Fashion Industry.
- Anthony Denis Kennan, OBE, Chairman, Multiple Sclerosis Society. For services to healthcare,
- George Kerr. For services to judo.
- Professor Ronald Alfred Laskey, lately Professor of Embryology, University of Cambridge and lately Director, Medical Research Council Cancer Cell Unit. For services to Science.
- John Hardress Wilfred Lloyd, Radio and Television Producer. For services to broadcasting.
- Ms Rosalynde Lowe, Chair, Queen's Nursing Institute. For services to Healthcare.
- Christopher Colin MacLehose. For services to the Publishing Industry.
- Wayne McGregor, Choreographer, For services to Dance
- Professor Quintin McKellar, Principal, Royal Veterinary College. For services to Science.
- Steve Rodney McQueen, OBE,. For Services to the Visual Arts.
- Jonathan Edward Moor, Director, Aviation Directorate, Department for Transport.
- Robert Stewart Napier, Chairman, Homes and Communities Agency and the Met Office. For public service.
- Nigel Thomas Newcomen, Deputy Chief Inspector of Prisons. For public service.
- Simon Norris, Deputy Director, Central Policy, London, H.M. Revenue and Customs.
- Michael John Oglesby. For services to Business and to Charity in the North West.
- Hamish Macgregor Ogston, Non-Executive Director, CCP Group plc. For services to Business and to the community in York.
- Michael Antonio Parker, Chairman, King's College Hospital NHS Foundation Trust. For services to the NHS.
- Dr Richard Newton Parker, lately Principal, Chichester College. For services to local and national Further Education.
- Giles Dominic St Richard Pegram, lately Director of Fundraising, NSPCC. For services to the Voluntary Sector.
- The Honourable Philip John Remnant. For services to the Financial Services Industry and to the Public Sector.
- Robert Nigel Ricketts, Director, System Management and New Enterprise, Department of Health.
- Diane Mary, Mrs Roberts, Principal, Brockenhurst College, Hampshire. For services to Further Education.
- Dr John Anthony Roberts, QC, DL. For services to the Administration of Justice, Diversity and to Equal Opportunities.
- Ms Amanda Rowlatt, Director of Analysis and Child Poverty, Employment Group, Department for Work and Pensions.
- Dr Sheila Joan Shribman, National Clinical Director for Children, Young People and Maternity, London. For services to Medicine.
- Dr Ambrose Joseph Smith, Principal, Aquinas Sixth Form College, Stockport. For services to local and national Education.
- Carole Lesley, Mrs Souter, Chief Executive, National Heritage Memorial Fund and Heritage Lottery Fund. For services to Conservation.
- Ms Katrine Sporle, Chief Executive, Planning Inspectorate, Department for Communities and Local Government.
- David Suchet, OBE, Actor. For services to Drama.
- Alastair John Sykes, lately Chairman and Chief Executive, Nestle ́UK. For services to the Food Industry.
- Museji Ahmed Takolia. For services to Diversity and to Equal Opportunities.
- Ann, Mrs Tate, lately Vice-Chancellor, University of Northampton. For services to Higher Education.
- Sheila Margaret, Mrs Taylor, Headteacher, Annette Street Primary School, Glasgow. For services to local and national Education in Scotland.
- Sara Joanne Thornton, QPM, Chief Constable, Thames Valley Police. For services to the Police.
- Arthur Torrington, OBE, Co-Founder, Equiano Society. For services to Black British Heritage.
- Professor Nicholas Tyler, Head of Department and Chadwick Professor of Civil Engineering, University College London. For services to Technology.
- Ms Janet Vitmayer, Chief Executive and Director, Horniman Museum. For services to Museums.
- Professor John Williamson Wallace, OBE, Principal, Royal Scottish Academy of Music and Drama. For services to Dance, Music and Drama Education in Scotland.
- Alison Jane, Mrs Ward, Chief Executive, Torfaen County Borough Council. For services to Local Government.
- Richard Wentworth, Sculptor. For services to art.
- The Right Reverend Martin Wharton, For services to the Church of England and to the community in the North East.
- Graham Clive White, Director, International Energy and Technology, Department of Energy and Climate Change.
- Brian Paul Whittaker, Chief Crown Prosecutor, Merseyside and Chairman, Cheshire and Mersey Group, Crown Prosecution Service.
- Tom Williams, Executive Vice-President of Programmes, Airbus SAS. For services to the Aerospace Industry.
- Dr David Wilson, Philanthropist. For services to Young People.
- Roger Leslie Wilson, Founder, Sarcoma UK Charity. For services to Healthcare.

Diplomatic and Overseas List

- John Llewellyn Mostyn Hughes, Non-Executive Chairman, INTEC Telecommunications Systems. For services to international telecommunications.
- Professor Barry John Kemp, Senior Research Fellow, McDonald Institute for Archaeological Research, University of Cambridge. For services to archaeology, education and international relations (Egypt).
- Richard Paul Margolis, Regional Director, North East Asia, Rolls-Royce. For services to UK business in China.

==== Officer of the Order of the British Empire (OBE) ====
Military Division

Royal Navy

- Commander James Stephen Donnelly, Royal Navy, C034959H.
- Commodore David John Evans, Royal Navy, C023830S.
- Commander David John Faulks, Royal Navy, C027514V.
- Commander Stuart Brian Furness, Royal Navy, C029178F.
- Captain Anthony Paul Holberry, Royal Navy, C033054Q.
- Captain Timothy Frederick Wilkins Martin, Royal Navy, C024445M.
- Commander Andrew Carnegie Stewart, Royal Navy, C026302P.

Army

- Colonel Colin Mark Abraham, late The Royal Logistic Corps, 513289.
- Lieutenant Colonel Jonathan Godson Eyre Bartholomew, The Royal Scots Dragoon Guards, 533970.
- Lieutenant Colonel James Jonathan Brasher, The Yorkshire Regiment, 519638.
- Colonel Charles Walter Francis Mowbray Cox, TD, late Royal Army Medical Corps, Territorial Army, 502145.
- Lieutenant Colonel Ian Roy Hicks, T.D., Royal Army Medical Corps, Territorial Army, 538502.
- Lieutenant Colonel Andrew James Large, Royal Corps of Signals, 551601.
- Lieutenant Colonel David Hugh Meyer, A.F.C., Army Air Corps, 520191.
- Lieutenant Colonel Michael James Vernon Smith, Army Air Corps, 524375.

Royal Air Force

- Wing Commander Nigel James Colman (8304546T), Royal Air Force.
- Wing Commander Andrew John Coope (2633636F), Royal Air Force.
- Group Captain Colin Hugh Hickman (5205092W), Royal Air Force.
- Wing Commander Andrew Timothy Martin (5204340N), Royal Air Force.
- Wing Commander Simon Christopher Prior (8029525E), Royal Air Force.
- Wing Commander Harv Smyth (8304516B), Royal Air Force.
- Group Captain Ian Richard Tolfts (8024208L), Royal Air Force.

Civil Division

- Sarah, Mrs. Aaronson. For services to Music and to Charity.
- John David Adams, General-Secretary, Voluntary Organisations Disability Group. For services to Social Care.
- Charubala, Mrs. Ainscough, Founder and Chair, Sahara Project. For services to Black and Minority Ethnic People in Lancashire.
- Councillor Nasim Ali, London Borough of Camden. For services to Local Government.
- Adrian Allen, Commercial Director, Advanced Manufacturing Research Centre. For services to Industry in the Yorkshire and Humber Region.
- Miss Kay Allen. For services to Equal Opportunities and to Diversity.
- Ms Ellah Wakatama Allfrey. For services to the Publishing Industry.
- Brian Ambrose, Chief Executive, George Best Belfast City Airport. For services to the Aviation Industry.
- Roger Arthur Simon Ames, lately Honorary Secretary, Air Squadron. For voluntary service to Aviation.
- Bruce Patrick Armstrong, T.D., Consultant Nurse and Emergency Planning Officer, Basingstoke and North Hampshire NHS Foundation Trust. For services to Healthcare.
- Ms Andrea Arnold, Director. For services to the Film Industry.
- Helen, Mrs. Ashby, Curator, National Railway Museum, York. For services to Heritage.
- Kevan Baker, Chairman of WheelPower. For voluntary service to Disability Sports.
- Gerald Barnard Balding. For services to Horse Racing.
- Robert Balmer. For services to Maritime Heritage in the North East.
- Vernon Ian Barker, Managing Director, First TransPennine Express. For services to the Rail Industry.
- Magnus MacFarlane-Barrow. For services to Mary's Meals Charity.
- Elizabeth, Mrs. Barton, Grade B1, Ministry of Defence.
- Ann, Mrs. Bates, Deputy Chair and Rail Group Chair, Disabled Person's Transport Advisory Committee. For services to disabled people.
- Andrew Ian Beeforth, Director, Cumbria Community Foundation. For services to the Voluntary Sector.
- Graham Clark Bell, Q.C. For services to the Legal Profession in Scotland.
- Marion, Mrs. Bennathan, Founder, Nurture Group Network. For services to Children and Young People with Special Needs.
- Ms Dinah Bennett. For services to Women's Entrepreneurship in the North East.
- Mark Laurence Bensted, lately London Director, British Waterways. For services to the Marine Industry.
- Ms Margaret Louise Berry, Director of Quality and Executive Nurse, NHS Luton Primary Care Trust. For services to Healthcare.
- Professor Sheila Macdonald Bird, Senior Scientist, Medical Research Council, Institute of Public Health, Cambridge. For services to Social Science.
- Janice, Mrs. Blackburn. Philanthropist. For services to the Arts.
- Jenny, Mrs. Body, lately Head of Research and Technology, Airbus UK-Aerospace. For services to the Defence Industry and to Engineering.
- Patricia, Mrs. Bolton, Vice-Chair, Victim Support Scotland. For services to Disadvantaged People.
- Richard John Boot. For services to Business in the West Midlands.
- Richard John Bottomley, Senior Partner, KPMG. For services to the Accountancy Profession and to Business in the North East.
- Hugh Robert Bourn. For charitable services and for services to the community in Lincolnshire.
- Robert Bowman, Philanthropist. For services to Music and to the Arts.
- Ms Ann Nuala Brice, lately Tribunals Judge. For services to the Administration of Justice.
- Dr. Ian Brick. For services to the community in Northern Ireland.
- Richard William Arthur Brough, Managing Director, Jenkins Shipping Ports Services Ltd. For services to Learning and Skills in the Humber Region.
- Mark Ronald Brownrigg, Director-General, Chamber of Shipping. For services to the Maritime Industry.
- Alexander Edward Buchan, lately Chief Executive Officer, Refugee Action. For services to Refugees.
- Ms Lisa Buckingham, Editor, Financial Mail on Sunday. For services to Journalism and to Women's Issues.
- Caroline, Mrs. Burden, lately Head of Planning, Government Office for the North East, Department for Communities and Local Government.
- Dr. Dorothy Faith Butt, Director of Lifelong Learning, University of Bath. For services to local and national Higher Education.
- Joseph Patrick Byrne, Head, Royal School for the Blind, Liverpool. For services to Education.
- Professor Muffy Calder, Professor of Formal Methods, University of Glasgow. For services to computer science.
- Jacqueline Elizabeth, Mrs. Callcut, First Secretary, Defence Supply, New Delhi, India, Department for Business, Innovation and Skills.
- Dr. Ian Allan Campbell, lately Consultant Respiratory Physician, Cardiff and Vale NHS Trust. For services to Medicine.
- Ms Fiona Cannon, Director of Diversity and Inclusion, Lloyds Banking Group. For services to Equal Opportunities.
- John Joseph Carey, lately Improving Child Case Management Manager, Pension Disability and Carers' Service, Department for Work and Pensions.
- Colin Carmichael, Chief Executive, Canterbury Council. For services to Local Government.
- John Carr. For services to Dairy Exports and to Business in the North East.
- Jonathan Mark Carruthers, Chairman, Lyric Theatre, Belfast. For services to Drama in Northern Ireland.
- Elizabeth Audrey, Mrs. Cartwright, Chair, Regional Housing Board, Hampshire Alliance for Rural Affordable Housing. For services to Local Government.
- Michael John Catt, MBE, for services to rugby.
- Ms Alice Chapman, Director, Youth Conference Service, Youth Justice Agency, Department of Justice, Northern Ireland Executive.
- Ms Susan Jardine Clarke, Strategic Manager for Achievement Collaboration, Devon County Council. For services to Education.
- Adrian Coles, Director-General, Building Societies Association. For services to the Financial Services Industry.
- John Patrick Chamberlain Collins. For services to the Tourism and Visitor Attractions Industries.
- John William Collinson, lately Director, King's College Hospital Charity and Executive Vice-Chairman, Association of NHS Charities. For services to the NHS.
- Margaret Joan, Mrs. Constantine, Co-Founder, Lush Cosmetics. For services to the Beauty Industry.
- Mark Constantine, Co-Founder, Lush Cosmetics. For services to the Beauty Industry.
- Ms Orla Corr, Director, McAvoy Group Ltd. For services to the Building Industry.
- Amanda Arianwen Cecilia, Mrs. Cottrell. For services to the community in Kent.
- Lesley Ruth, Mrs. Cowley, Chief Executive, Nominet. For services to the Internet and eCommerce.
- Professor Susan Jean Cox, Dean, Lancaster University Management School. For services to Social Science.
- Ms Elizabeth Ann Crichton, Manager, the Chai Centre, Burnley. For services to Families.
- Dr. George Crooks, Medical Director, NHS 24 and the Scottish Ambulance Service. For services to Healthcare.
- Ms Marie Crossin, Chief Executive, CAUSE. For services to Carers in Northern Ireland.
- Robert Cummines, Chief Executive, UNLOCK. For services to Reformed Offenders.
- Councillor Elizabeth Cunningham. For services to the community in East Renfrewshire and Malawi.
- Ann Patricia, Mrs. Cutcliffe. For services to Para Equestrian Sport.
- John Arthur Cuthbert. For services to Business in the North East.
- Gordon D'Silva, Chief Executive, Training for Life. For services to Social Enterprise in London and Devon.
- Professor Wendy Dagworthy, Professor and Head, Department of Fashion and Head, School of Fashion and Textiles, Royal College of Art. For services to the Fashion Industry.
- Steven John Dalton, Managing Director, Sony Pencoed, Bridgend. For services to Industry in Wales.
- Elaine, Mrs. Davidson, Headteacher, Tanshall Primary School, Fife. For services to Education.
- Dr. John Davies, lately Consultant Cardiologist, Royal Gwent Hospital. For services to Medicine.
- Julie Elizabeth, Mrs. Davies, Business Crime Manager, Staffordshire Police. For services to the Police.
- Tom Davies, Commissioner for Wales, Independent Police Complaints Commission. For public service.
- John Richard Kelsey De Quidt, lately Chief Executive, Football Licensing Authority. For services to Sport.
- Dr. Pinnaduwage Ariyaraten De Silva, lately Consultant Physician, Genito Urinary and HIV Medicine, Dewsbury District Hospital, West Yorkshire. For services to Medicine.
- Ms Jean Dent, lately Director of City Development, Leeds City Council. For services to Local Government. Monsignor John Devine. For services to Inter-faith Relations in the North West.
- John Dixon, Executive Director, Adults and Children and Deputy Chief Executive, West Sussex CountyCouncil. For services to Local Government.
- Catherine Mary, Mrs. Wellingbrook-Doswell. For services to the Administration of Justice in North East London.
- Alexander Frank Downie. For public service in the Isle of Man.
- Norman Henry Draper, Justices' Clerk for Merseyside, H.M. Courts Service, Ministry of Justice.
- Andrew Martin Duffell, Chief Dealer, UK Debt Management Office, H.M. Treasury.
- Keith Duggan, lately Headteacher, Gateway Primary School, Westminster, London. For services to Education.
- Ms Phyllis Dunipace, lately Director of Children's Services, London Borough of Lambeth. For services to Families.
- Stephen Lloyd Dunmore. For services to the Public and Voluntary Sectors.
- Keith Melville Dunn, Chief Executive, Order of St. John Priory for Wales, St. John Cymru Wales. For service to Healthcare.
- Stephen Dunne, Grade B1, Ministry of Defence.
- Valerie Gail, Mrs. Easterbrook, lately Chief Executive, Institute of Internal Auditors. For services to the Auditing Profession.
- John Clayton Edwards. For services to the community in Somerset.
- Andrew Digby Emson, Superintendent Pharmacist, Boots the Chemist and lately Chairman, Company Chemists' Association. For services to Healthcare.
- Carole, Mrs. Evans, Grade 7, Head of Contact Centre, Driver and Vehicle Licensing Agency, Department for Transport.
- Richard Anthony Spencer Everard, D.L. For services to the community in Leicestershire and Rutland.
- Semage Rupasiri Fernando, Managing Director, Ardmel Group Ltd. For services to Charity.
- Ms Melanie Field, Head, Discrimination Law Review, Government Equalities Office.
- Dr. Michael John Field, Chairman of the Corporation, Great Yarmouth College. For services to the Voluntary Sector.
- Johan, Mrs. Findlay, J.P. For services to the Administration of Justice in Scotland.
- John Fitzpatrick, Headteacher, Williamwood High School, East Renfrewshire. For services to Education.
- Dr. Kevin Fitzpatrick. For services to disabled people in Wales.
- Professor Christopher Franklin, Chairman, Committee of Postgraduate Dental Deans and Directors and Professor and Honorary Consultant Oral Pathologist. For services to Healthcare.
- James Gale. For services to the Horseracing Industry.
- Colin Gibbs, Senior Lawyer, Crown Prosecution Service.
- Professor Paul Gilbert, Professor Clinical Psychologist, Derbyshire Mental Health Services NHS Trust. For services to Healthcare.
- Professor Evelyn Margaret Gill, lately Chief Scientific Adviser, Rural and Environment, Scottish Government.
- David Christopher Glancy, T.D., Senior Depute Fiscal, Crown Office and Procurator Fiscal Service, Scottish Government.
- Andrew Julian Goldberg, Consultant Orthopaedic Surgeon, Royal National Orthopaedic Hospital, Senior Lecturer UCL, and Founder, Medical Futures Innovation Awards. For services to Medicine.
- Dr. Dillian Rosalind Gordon, lately Curator, National Gallery. For services to Early Italian Painting.
- Ms Alison Hadley, Head of Teenage Pregnancy Unit, Department for Education.
- Stephen Hale, lately Director, Green Alliance. For services to the Environment.
- John Hamer. For services to Heritage Education.
- Mimi, Mrs. Harker. For services to Women, particularly Black, Asian and Minority Ethnic Women in the Public Sector and to the community in Amersham, Buckinghamshire.
- William Charles Harpur, Principal, Ballycastle High School, County Antrim. For services to Education in Northern Ireland.
- Paul Francis Harris, Operations Director, Makita Manufacturing Europe Ltd. For services to International Trade.
- Mark Andrew Harvey. For public service.
- John Edward Havard, Head of Gas Policy, Energy Markets and Infrastructure Group, Department of Energy and Climate Change.
- Patricia Stacey, Mrs. Henchie, lately Headteacher, Lowther Primary School, Richmond-upon-Thames. For services to Education.
- Professor Helen Elisabeth Higson, Senior Pro-Vice- Chancellor and Professor of Higher Education Learning and Management, Aston University. For services to Higher Education.
- Tatjana, Mrs. Hine, Managing Director, TBDA (Scotland) Ltd. For services to Business.
- Ms Marian Holmes, Chief Executive, Civil Service Sports Council.
- Ms Susan Hoyle. For services to Contemporary Dance.
- Robert Merfyn Hughes, lately Inward Investment Manager, Department for Economy and Transport, Welsh Assembly Government.
- Trevor George Hursthouse, Chairman, Specialist Engineering Contractors' Group. For services to the Construction Industry.
- The Venerable Dr Michael Ipgrave, for services to inter-faith relations in London.
- Elizabeth, Mrs. Ivil, lately Headteacher, Oakley Cross Primary School and Nursery, County Durham. For services to Education.
- Ms Jane Therese Jackson, Artistic Director, Artes Mundi. For services to Art.
- Professor Michael Christopher Jackson, Professor of Management Systems and Dean, Business School, University of Hull. For services to Higher Education and to Business.
- Miles Jacobson, Studio Director, Sports Interactive. For services to the computer games industry.
- Robyn Anne, Mrs. Jones, Chief Executive, C. H. & Co. For services to the Hospitality Industry.
- John William Keast, lately National Government Adviser on Religious Education. For services to Education.
- Alastair Kent, Director, Genetic Alliance U.K. For services to Healthcare.
- Ms Nargis Khan, Deputy Chair, Community Wellbeing Board, Local Government Association. For services to Local Government.
- Jill, Mrs. Allen-King, M.B.E. For services to Blind and Partially Sighted People.
- Herbert Kretzmer, Lyricist and Songwriter. For services to music.
- Herbert (Burt) Kwouk, Actor. For services to drama.
- Peter Kyle, lately Chief Executive, Shakespeare's Globe Theatre. For services to Drama.
- Richard Edward Dominic Langford. For services to Sailing and to Windsurfing.
- Maureen, Mrs. Laycock, lately Headteacher, Firth Park Community Arts College, Sheffield. For services to Education.
- Geraldine, Mrs. Lejeune, Director, Berkshire East and South Buckinghamshire Women's Aid. For services to Vulnerable Families
- Ms Ann Lennox, for services to OXFAM.
- Victor Leverett, Business Development Director, Finmeccanica UK Ltd. For services to the Defence Industry.
- Miss Tracey Locke, HR Director, Benefits and Credits, London, H.M. Revenue and Customs.
- Stuart Alan Long, Grade B2, Ministry of Defence. Richard Longthorp, Chairman, Agri-Skills Strategy Group. For services to the Farming Industry.
- Professor Christopher Robin Lowe, Professor of Biotechnology, University of Cambridge. For services to science.
- John Francis Lynch, Head of Heathrow Passenger Services, UK Border Agency, Home Office.
- John Stewart Lynch, lately Head, BBC Science Unit. For services to Broadcasting.
- Alexander Wright MacCormick, Grade B1, Ministry of Defence.
- Douglas MacLean. For services to Music and to Charity in Scotland.
- Professor Donald James Renwick MacRae. For services to Enterprise and to Rural Development in Scotland.
- James Nicol Manson, Chairman, Highlands and Loch Ness Marketing Group. For services to the Tourist Industry in Scotland.
- Professor David Clive Anthony Mant, Emeritus Professor of General Practice, University of Oxford. For services to Medicine.
- Dr. Colin Matthews, Composer. For services to music.
- Edward McArdle, lately Registrar, General Teaching Council for Northern Ireland. For services to Education.
- Thomas McCall, Clerk and Chief Executive, Newry and Mourne District Council. For services to Local Government in Northern Ireland.
- William Gerard McGuinness, Client Manager Aerospace and Defence Team, Invest Northern Ireland, Northern Ireland Executive.
- Comghall McNally. For services to Legal Education in Northern Ireland.
- Ms Sheila Meadows. For services to Education in Wales.
- Colin Douglas Livingstone Menzies. For services to the Church of England.
- Margaret Whyte, Mrs. Moffat. For charitable services in North Ayrshire.
- Councillor Paul Morris. For services to the community in Finsbury Park, London Borough of Islington.
- John Lowrie Morrison, for services to art and to charity in Scotland.
- Mohammed Mossadaq, Equality Adviser, Hampshire County Council. For services to Local Government.
- Neville Anthony Nagler. For services to Inter-faith Relations and to Jewish People.
- Ms Sally Christine Neocosmos, lately Interim Registrar, School of Oriental and African Studies, University of London. For services to Higher Education.
- Margaret, Mrs. Nicol, lately Board Member, Scottish Qualifications Authority. For services to Education in Fife.
- Gerald Ernest Oppenheim, Director of Policy and Partnerships, Big Lottery Fund. For services to the Voluntary Sector.
- Margaret Ann, Mrs. Owen. For services to Human Rights, particularly Widows Overseas.
- Keith Bruce Panes, lately Academy Project Lead, Schools Directorate, Department for Education.
- Vivienne Mary Hunt Parry, for services to the public understanding of science.
- Dr. Brian George Patterson, General Medical Practitioner and lately Chairman, British Medical Association, Northern Ireland. For services to Healthcare.
- Ms Myra Pearson, Head, School of Education, University of Aberdeen. For services to Higher Education.
- Pauline Marion, Mrs. Pendlebury, Consultant Headteacher, Bradford, West Yorkshire. For services to Education.
- Dr. Paul Lasseter Phillips, Principal and Chief Executive, Weston College, Weston-Super-Mare. For services to Further Education and to the Voluntary Sector.
- Dr. Jeune Guishard-Pine, Educational Psychologist and Counsellor. For services to Families.
- William Pollard, Deputy Director, Business.gov Programme, London, H.M. Revenue and Customs.
- Ms Sandy Powell, Costume Designer. For services to the Film Industry.
- Patrick Ralph Print, lately Chairman, British Horse Society. For services to Equestrianism.
- Gary Pugh, Director of Forensic Science, Metropolitan Police Service. For services to the Police.
- Miss Alison Quant, President, ADEPT (Association of Directors of Environment, Economy, Planning and Transport). For services to Local Government.
- John Barrington Quin, lately Chief Executive, Royal British Legion Industries. For services to ex-Servicemen and Women.
- Victoria, Mrs. Ranson, Grade 6, Head of Intelligence Assessment, London, H.M. Revenue and Customs.
- Major Ralston Ashley Rawlins, T.D., D.L. For services to the community in West Yorkshire.
- Nicholas Philip Reeves, President, Chartered Institution of Water and Environmental Management. For services to the Environment.
- Matthew Gilbert Rhodes. For services to Pro Bono Legal Advice.
- Nirpal Singh Riat. For services to Charity and to Punjabi People.
- Ellis Rich. For services to the Music Publishing Industry.
- Rehana, Mrs. Richens, Consultant Midwife and Honorary Lecturer, City University, Warwickshire. For services to Nursing and Midwifery.
- Councillor Colin Rigby, lately Member, Blackburn with Darwen Council. For services to Local Government.
- Sonia, Mrs. Rolt, F.R.S. For services to Industrial Archaeology and to Heritage.
- Ms Shelia Kathleen Rosenberg. For services to ESOL Teaching.
- Barbara, Mrs. Ross. For services to Gender Dysphoria.
- James Hood Ross, lately Chairman, Leadership Foundation for Higher Education. For voluntary service to Higher Education.
- David Colin Roy. For services to the community in the West Midlands.
- Margaret, Mrs. Ryall, lately Headteacher, Our Lady of Victories Primary School, Borough of Wandsworth. For services to Education.
- Professor Jennifer Ann Saint, lately Dean of School, Nottingham Trent University. For services to Further and Higher Education.
- Tina, Mrs. Sampson, Head, Direct Communications Unit, Prime Minister's Office.
- Jonathan Sands, Chairman, Elmwood Design Ltd. For services to the Creative Industries.
- Ms Tanya Sarne, Designer. For services to the Fashion Industry.
- Ms Gillian Saunders, Secretariat Team Leader, Social Security Advisory Committee, Department for Work and Pensions.
- Theonitsa, Mrs. Sergides, Headteacher, Grafton Primary School, London Borough of Islington. For services to Education.
- Helen, Mrs. Sexton, lately Principal and Chief Executive, National Star College, Cheltenham. For services to local and national Special Needs Education.
- Kay, Mrs. Sheldon, Commissioner, Care Quality Commission. For services to Healthcare.
- Emeritus Professor Patricia Shenton, Director of Avis Academies and Trust School Development, Liverpool John Moores University. For services to Education and Training.
- Colin Deverell Smith. For services to Assured Food Standards.
- Edward Smith, lately Head of Customer Standards, Department for Work and Pensions.
- Dr. Elizabeth Ogilvy Statham, lately Head of Ethnic Minority Achievement Service, Hampshire County Council. For services to Education.
- Professor Fiona Steele, Professor of Social Statistics, University of Bristol. For services to Social Science.
- Andrew Robert Colin Stephens, Head of International Engagement and Board Secretary, British Library. For services to Scholarship.
- Dr. Allison Streetly, National Director, NHS Sickle Cell and Thalassaemia Screening Programme. For services to Healthcare.
- James Edward Sugden, Managing Director, Johnstons of Elgin. For services to the Textile Industry in Scotland.
- Ms Lynne Sullivan. For services to Architecture.
- Ms Moira Swann, lately Corporate Director, Children's Services, Cumbria County Council. For services to families.
- Chu Ting Tang. For services to Chinese People in Chinatown, Westminster, London.
- Purnima, Mrs. Tanuku, Chief Executive, National Day Nurseries Association. For services to Families.
- Dr. John Crawshaw Taylor, Inventor. For services to Business and to Horology.
- Philip John Taylor, Senior Governor, H.M. Prison Wormwood Scrubs, H.M. Prison Service, Ministry of Justice.
- Dr. Peter Brian Terry, Consultant in Obstetrics and Gynaecology, Aberdeen Royal Infirmary and Chairman of the British Medical Association Scottish Council. For services to Medicine.
- Richard Thompson, Folk Musician and Songwriter. For services to music.
- Margaret, Viscountess Thurso. For services to the community in Caithness.
- Nichola, Mrs. Tinkler, lately Head of Business Development, Child Exploitation and Online Protection Centre. For public service.
- Leslie Tippin, Grade B2, Ministry of Defence.
- Professor Geoffrey Railton Tomlinson, Professor of Engineering Dynamics, University of Sheffield. For services to Technology.
- Dr. Carol Turley, Research Scientist, Plymouth Marine Laboratory. For services to Science.
- Ms Janet Lesley Veitch. For services to Women's Rights and to Gender Equality.
- David Waddington, lately Principal, Hartlepool College of Further Education. For services to Education and Training.
- Ms Yasmin Waljee. For services to Disadvantaged Young Muslims.
- Frank Harrison Walker, lately Chief Minister of Jersey. For public service.
- George Donald Walker. For charitable services.
- Barbara Anne, Mrs. Ward, Principal, Cross and Passion College, Ballycastle, County Antrim. For services to Education in Northern Ireland.
- Mike Watson, Area Manager, Central London Tribunals Service, Ministry of Justice.
- Ronald Watt, for services to Karate.
- Andrew Mark Weston, Grade B2, Ministry of Defence. Nicholas John Wheeler, lately Chief Executive, Pembrokeshire Coast National Park Authority. For services to the Environment.
- Roger White, lately Chief Executive, ASDAN (Award Scheme Development and Accreditation Network). For services to Young People.
- David Whitehead, Director, British Ports Association. For services to the Ports Industry.
- Kenneth Wild. For services to Financial Reporting.
- Peter Wilkinson, lately Technical Specialist, Environment Agency Wales. For public service.
- Paul Michael Williams, Chairman, Deeside College Corporation, Flintshire. For services to Further Education in Wales.
- Jean Sue, Mrs. Wilson, Principal and Chief Executive, South Thames College. For services to local and national Further Education.
- Margaret, Mrs. Wilson. For services to the Administration of Justice in London.
- Robert William Gordon Wilson, lately Deputy Head of the Committee Office, House of Commons.
- The Reverend Canon Andrew Wingate. For Inter-faith Relations and to the community in Leicester.
- Pamela, Mrs. Wright, Executive Headteacher, Wade Deacon High School, Halton, Cheshire. For services to local and national Education.
- Stephen Wyler, Director, Development Trusts Association. For services to the voluntary sector.

==== Member of the Order of the British Empire (MBE) ====
Military Division

Royal Navy

- Lieutenant Commander Stephen Edward Adamson, Royal Navy, C039830F.
- Lieutenant Commander Reginald Paul William Bell, Royal Navy, C026128K.
- Lieutenant Commander Andrew Patrick Clarke, Royal Navy, C032035C.
- Captain (Acting Major) Robert Nigel Ginn, Royal Marines, N028995V.
- Major Mark John Hardie, Royal Marines, N029302Y.
- Lieutenant Commander Richard Simon Harrison, Royal Navy, C037860T.
- Lieutenant Commander Anthony William Jervis Jenks, Royal Navy, C022956Y.
- Warrant Officer Class 2 John Stuart Jones, Royal Marines, P042622P.
- Warrant Officer Class 1 Alistair Iain McGill, QGM., Royal Marines, P042976W.
- Lieutenant Commander Paul Nimmons, Royal Navy, C037084V.
- Lieutenant Commander Jack Rickard, Royal Navy, C040630N.
- Chief Petty Officer (Diver) William Sharp, D190784G.
- Warrant Officer Class 1 Ronald Sinclair, Royal Marines, P041506G.
- Lieutenant (now Lieutenant Commander) Rachel Smallwood, Royal Navy, V031154D.
- Colour Sergeant (Acting Warrant Officer Class 2) Laird Webster, Royal Marines, P046816C.

Army

- Lieutenant Colonel Phillip John Abram, Royal Corps of Signals, 533967.
- Major Jeremy Bayard Barron, The Royal Irish Regiment, 547856
- Lieutenant Colonel Thomas Julian Bateman, The Royal Scots Dragoon Guards, 536330.
- Major James Richard Bryden, The Yorkshire Regiment, 536332.
- Lieutenant Colonel Michael Edward George Caldicott, The Royal Logistic Corps, 537394.
- Major Andrew John Cerson, Adjutant General's Corps (Staff and Personnel Support Branch), Territorial Army, 542568.
- Major John Lockhart Clark, Corps of Royal Engineers, 548496.
- Major Andrew Robert Devey, Corps of Royal Engineers, 535769.
- Acting Lieutenant Colonel James McShane Docherty, West Lowland Army Cadet Force, 501766.
- Major Simon John Doyle, The Princess of Wales's Royal Regiment, 551274.
- Chaplain to the Forces (3rd Class) Ian Robert Gamble, Royal Army Chaplains' Department, Territorial Army, 553036.
- Captain Andrew Steven Gee, The Royal Logistic Corps, 24754533.
- Captain Robert Martin Gillespie, The Royal Irish Regiment, 24757108.
- Warrant Officer Class 2 David Alan Hummerston, The Princess of Wales's Royal Regiment, 24738024.
- Major Samuel Leslie Humphris, The Yorkshire Regiment, 548954.
- Major Toby Clive Mainprise-King Jackman, The Royal Gurkha Rifles, 536648.
- Captain James Andrew Keeley, Grenadier Guards, 24723165.
- Major Andrew Gordon Lewis, The Royal Logistic Corps, 536679.
- Captain Noel Robert Henry Magill, The Mercian Regiment, 24779477.
- Captain Keith John Mahoney, The Mercian Regiment, Territorial Army, 548445.
- Captain Craig Alexander McBurney, The Rifles, 24721630.
- Captain Ian Stephen Moore, The Royal Welsh, Territorial Army, 565487.
- Major Nicholas Paul Mott, Welsh Guards, 559868.
- Colour Sergeant John Paul Myers, Welsh Guards, 24908590.
- Lieutenant Colonel Shaun Howard Nield, Royal Regiment of Artillery, Territorial Army, 533596.
- Captain Simon Leslie John Oliver, Royal Regiment of Artillery, 24759786.
- Captain Andrew Pemberton, The Rifles, 24748173.
- Captain Clive Terence Phillimore, The Princess of Wales's Royal Regiment, Territorial Army, 563012.
- Sergeant Sean Peter Powell, Corps of Royal Engineers, 25027396.
- Warrant Officer Class 2 Wesley Robert Quigley, Royal Army Veterinary Corps, 24851955.
- Captain Michael Reed, The Light Dragoons, 566560.
- Warrant Officer Class 1 Nicola Seymour, Queen Alexandra's Royal Army Nursing Corps, Q1025011.
- Captain Jay Shaw, The Royal Regiment of Fusiliers, 24631766.
- Warrant Officer Class 2 Paul Andrew Simpson, Corps of Royal Electrical and Mechanical Engineers, 24678839.
- Captain Andrew John Slater, Q.G.M., The Parachute Regiment, 24683477.
- Staff Sergeant Robert Smith, The Royal Logistic Corps, 24714045.
- Major David Mark Stanbridge, Q.G.M., The Parachute Regiment, 553470.
- Chaplain to the Forces (3rd Class) Alan Christopher Steele, Royal Army Chaplains' Department, 550177.
- Major Stephen Brian Sutherland, The Royal Logistic Corps, 544118.
- Captain Mark Robert Todd, Royal Corps of Signals, 24697151.
- Major Mark William Torpy, A.F.M., Army Air Corps, 541848.
- Warrant Officer Class 2 Raymond Allan Wall, The Parachute Regiment, 24645789.

Royal Air Force

- Squadron Leader Garry Donovan (8105814L), Royal Air Force.
- Corporal Karen Elizabeth Edwards (L8309781), Royal Air Force.
- Master Aircrew Andrew Michael Gillett (P8600258), Royal Air Force.
- The Reverend (Squadron Leader) Ruth Victoria Hake (8701772H), Royal Air Force.
- Corporal Kristian Lawrence Harrison (P8447418), Royal Air Force.
- Squadron Leader Richard James Hillard (2644060A), Royal Air Force.
- Master Aircrew Darren Isaac (C8260508), Royal Air Force.
- Flight Sergeant Richard Leslie Knowles (S8288501), Royal Air Force.
- Flight Lieutenant Jacqueline Aileen MacDonald (2662393B), Royal Air Force.
- Sergeant John McClymont (R8434163), Royal Air Force.
- Warrant Officer Christopher Charles Miles (F8129218), Royal Air Force.
- Squadron Leader Paul Michael Rose (2644033L), Royal Air Force.
- Squadron Leader Stephen Stanton (8021034S), Royal Air Force Reserve.
- Warrant Officer Derek Wintrip (E8125428), Royal Air Force.
- The Reverend (Squadron Leader) Edward Laurence Wynn (8701626P), Royal Air Force.

Civil Division

- Dr. Tariq Abbasi, Director, Greenwich Islamic Centre. For services to Community Cohesion in the London Boroughs of Greenwich and Bexley.
- Heather, Mrs. Abbott. For services to the community in Holyhead, Anglesey.
- John James Adams. For services to the Fishing Industry in South Wales.
- Barbara Elizabeth, Mrs. Alexander. For voluntary service to the British Red Cross Society in Lancashire.
- Heather Anita, Mrs. Allen. For services to the Voluntary Sector.
- Nora Damaris, Mrs. Allen. For services to H.M. Prison Featherstone, Wolverhampton and to the community in Cannock Chase, Staffordshire.
- Miss Debra Allott, Senior Executive Officer, Jobcentre Plus, Department for Work and Pensions.
- Paul Anderson, Chief Executive Officer, UK Centre for Carnival Arts. For services to the Arts.
- Andrew Georgios Andreou, Executive Assistant, Universities and Skills Group, Department for Business, Innovation and Skills.
- Elizabeth, Mrs. Andrews. For services to disabled children and their families.
- Joyce, Mrs. Andrews. For voluntary service to Wimbledon and Merton Swimming Club.
- Carol, Mrs. Armstrong, Higher Officer Intelligence and National Operations, Border Force, UK Border Agency, Home Office.
- David John Asker, Head, Learning and Skills, H.M. Prison Wandsworth, H.M. Prison Service, Ministry of Justice.
- Peter Mark Astley, Head of Public Protection, Warrington Borough Council. For services to Consumers in the North West.
- Thomas Hume Attenburgh. For voluntary service to the Scouts in Edinburgh.
- Shirley, Mrs. Austin, lately Occupational Therapy Technician. For services to Healthcare in Hampshire.
- Sydney George Badland. For services to the community in North Wales.
- Anthony Bagnall, Farm Foreman, H.M. Prison Bullingdon, H.M. Prison Service, Ministry of Justice.
- Miss Kathleen Bailey, lately Judges' Lodgings Manager and Chef, H.M. Courts Service, West Midlands, Ministry of Justice.
- Jaswinder Bains, Chief Executive, Ashram Housing Association. For services to Social Housing and to Community Cohesion in the West Midlands.
- David Mitchell-Baker. For services to the community in Mid-Surrey.
- Peter George Baker, Security Vetting Officer, Department of Health.
- Dr. Qadir Bakhsh. For services to Community Cohesion in the East of England.
- Miriam Philomena, Mrs. Baldock. For services to West Bletchley Community Association, Milton Keynes.
- Harold Mike Barnaby. For services to Visually Impaired People in Lincolnshire and Overseas.
- Miss Wendy Barnes, Assistant Personal Secretary, Private Office, H.M. Revenue and Customs.
- Miss Elizabeth Jane Barron, Curriculum Manager for Science and Sport, Inverness College. For services to Science Engagement.
- Jean, Mrs. Bartlett. For services to the Aylesbury Estate, London Borough of Southwark.
- Miss Helen Marie Batty, Higher Executive Officer, Jobcentre Plus, Department for Work and Pensions.
- Ronald Keith Beadle. For voluntary service to St. John Ambulance in Suffolk and London District.
- John Beattie, Councillor, Castlereagh Borough Council. For services to Local Government in Northern Ireland.
- Dr. Jane Elizabeth Beaumont, Director of Accreditation, United Kingdom Accreditation Service. For services to Industry.
- Dr. Roger Hugh Beeching. For services to the community in Sawbridgeworth, Hertfordshire.
- Ms Shaben Begum, Director, Scottish Independent Advocacy Alliance. For services to Healthcare.
- Alexandra Victoria, Mrs. Bell. For services to people with Learning Disabilities in Northamptonshire.
- Gordon Robert Bell. For services to the community in the London Borough of Hackney.
- John Balderston Bell. For voluntary service to the Royal British Legion Scotland in West Lothian.
- Lesley, Mrs. Benham, Team Leader, Melcombe Day Hospital. For services to Dementia Care in Weymouth, Dorset.
- Beryl Jane, Mrs. Bennett, Deputy Chief Executive and Director of International and Corporate Affairs, Royal College of Obstetricians and Gynaecologists. For services to Women's Health.
- Glennis Anne, Mrs. Bentley. For voluntary service to Young People in Peterborough, Cambridgeshire.
- Dr. Anthony Noble Bethell. For services to the community in Dronfield, Derbyshire.
- Dr. Jill Bethell. For services to the community in Dronfield, Derbyshire.
- Eileen, Mrs. Bewick, Network Support Office Team Manager, Network Support Office, Durham, H.M. Revenue and Customs.
- Robert Irvine Cussins Bieber. For services to the Voluntary Sector.
- Patricia Selina, Mrs. Birley, Co-Founder, Vindolanda Trust. For services to Roman Heritage in Northumberland.
- Eileen Betty, Mrs. Roe-Bishop. For services to Classical Music and to Composition.
- Sally, Mrs. Bishop, Private Secretary, Research and Development Directorate, Department of Health.
- Ms Susan Biss, Higher Executive Officer, Jobcentre Plus, Department for Work and Pensions.
- Ms Margaret Bissett. For charitable services to the Beatson Oncology Centre, Glasgow.
- Jennifer Guy, Mrs. Tripp-Black. For charitable services in North London.
- Frances Allen, Mrs. Blackbourne. For services to the community in Northern Ireland.
- Miss Norma Blaine. For services to Athletics.
- Kofi Sarpong-Boachie, Executive Officer, Jobcentre Plus, Department for Work and Pensions.
- Clive Bonnett, Senior Clinical Specialist, West London Mental Health Trust and Broadmoor Hospital. For services to Healthcare.
- Gavin Booth. For services to the UK Antarctic Heritage Trust.
- Ronald Trevor Booth. For services to the community in Nottingham.
- Judith Anne, Mrs. Borland. For voluntary service to SSAFA Forces Help in Cambridgeshire.
- Paul Boskett. For services to Cheshire Youth Service.
- Elizabeth Robertson Macdonald, Mrs. Bow. For services to the community in Nairn and in the Highlands.
- Anne, Mrs. Bowen. Managing Director, Ardclinis Outdoor Adventure. For services to the Tourist in Northern Ireland
- The Reverend Christopher Bower. For services to the community in Northern Ireland.
- Norma, Mrs. Boyes, Administration Officer, Rural Payments Agency, Department for Environment, Food and Rural Affairs.
- Gillian, Mrs. Boyle, Higher Officer, Customer Contact Directorate, Newcastle upon Tyne, H.M. Revenue and Customs.
- Martyn Bracegirdle, lately Chairman, Cheshire and Warrington Connexions Partnership. For services to Young People.
- Yvonne, Mrs. Braithwaite. For voluntary service to Macmillan Cancer Support in Cambridgeshire.
- David Brindle, Director of Resources, Lancashire Constabulary. For services to the Police.
- Mary, Mrs. Bromiley, Equine Physiotherapist. For services to Equestrian Sport.
- Elizabeth Sarah, Mrs. Broomhead. For voluntary service to Netball.
- Gary Brown, Fiscal Crime Liaison Officer, British Embassy, Bucharest, H.M. Revenue and Customs.
- Dr. Lydia Akrigg Brown, President, Veterinary Benevolent Fund. For services to the Veterinary Profession.
- Peter Brown, Director, Fairfax House. For services to Heritage in York.
- Ms Sonia Brown. For services to Black and Minority Ethnic Women.
- Ms Elizabeth Anne Buchanan, Commercial Partners Director, VisitScotland. For services to the Tourist Industry.
- Jean Ann, Mrs. Buck. For services to Wildlife Conservation in the Isle of Man.
- Anne Elizabeth, Mrs. Buckingham. For services to Beekeeping in Surrey.
- Stephen Burrows, Head of Security, Royal Courts of Justice, H.M. Courts Service, Ministry of Justice.
- Melvyn Edward Butcher, Chairman of Governors, Leagrave Primary School, Luton. For voluntary service to Education.
- Cecilia, Mrs. Butler. For services to Older People in the Isle of Arran, Ayrshire.
- Ms Laraine Callow, Director of Deafworks. For services to Deaf and Hearing Impaired People.
- Professor Stuart William Cameron, Chief Engineer, Doosan Babcock. For services to Mechanical Engineering.
- Stella, Mrs. Canwell, lately Chief Examiner for A-level English Literature, Assessment and Qualifications Alliance Examination Board. For services to Education.
- Alice, Mrs. Carnduff. For voluntary service to Save the Children in Paisley, Renfrewshire.
- Ms Catherine Carnegie, Managing Director, Triage Central Ltd. For services to Unemployed People in Forth Valley, Fife and Tayside.
- Jacqueline, Mrs. Carrier, Grade D, Ministry of Defence.
- Ms Margaret Jean (Molly) Carson. For public service.
- Joseph Carvill. For voluntary service to St. John Ambulance in Northern Ireland.
- Paul Andrew Caswell, Police Youth Diversionary Officer, Humberside Police. For services to the community in North East Lincolnshire.
- George Hill Chambers. For services to Jazz Music in Industry in Northern Ireland.
- Linda Mary, Mrs. Chapman, lately Tonbridge Field Officer, The Duke of Edinburgh's Award. For services to Young People in Kent.
- Peter John Soloman Child. For services to People with Visual Impairment in Norfolk.
- Eileen Gertrude, Mrs. Chisholm. For services to the community in North Somerset.
- Peter Nicolas Chisholm, lately Headteacher, Yehudi Menuhin School, Cobham, Surrey. For services to Music Education.
- Ms Zahida Chohan, Executive Officer, Jobcentre Plus, Department for Work and Pensions.
- Gulam Mustafa Choudhury. For services to the Bangladeshi community in Greater Manchester.
- Michael Mark Chrimes, Head Librarian, Institution of Civil Engineers. For services to Engineering.
- Ms Marie Hazel Clark. For services to the community in Hendon and in the East End of Sunderland.
- Angela, Mrs. Clarke. For services to the community in Hammersmith, West London.
- David Clarke, Chief Executive, British Computer Society. For services to the IT Industry.
- Rosemary, Mrs. Clarke, Director, Bookstart Gifting Programmes. For services to Education.
- Andrew Coggins. For services to Contemporary Dance and to Disadvantaged People.
- Jane Elizabeth, Mrs. Colclough, Lead Custodian, Rhuddlan Castle, Welsh Assembly Government.
- Marie Eleanor, Mrs. Collins. For voluntary service to Sport in Milton Keynes, Buckinghamshire.
- Stephanie, Mrs. Collis, Community Outreach Officer, Sparrow Farm Infant/Nursery School, Feltham. For services to Education in the London Borough of Hounslow.
- Ms Alison Comley, Service Director, Safer Bristol, Bristol City Council. For services to Local Government.
- Ms Vivien Consalvey, Personal Assistant, Commercial Directorate, Manchester, H.M. Revenue and Customs.
- Miss Susan Constantinidies. For services to Cypriot People.
- Gordon Francis Cook. For voluntary service to the RAF Association in Surrey.
- Ms Margaret Cooke. For services to the community in Merseyside.
- Christine Susan, Mrs. Cookman. For services to the community in Stillington, North Yorkshire.
- Lynne, Mrs. Cooper. For services to the Voluntary Sector.
- Leonard Stephen Corby. For services to the British Trust for Conservation Volunteers.
- Elinor, Mrs. Cordiner. For services to the Drinking Water Inspectorate.
- David Courtney, Foster Carer, Kent County Council. For services to Families.
- Patricia, Mrs. Courtney, Foster Carer, Kent County Council. For services to Families.
- Peter Damien Cox. For services to Community Arts in Rhayader, Powys.
- Howard Crabb, Production Manager, Marshall Aerospace. For services to the Defence Industry.
- Evelyn Ann, Mrs. Crabtree. For services to the community in Hinckley, Leicestershire.
- Daphne Susan, Mrs. Creed. For services to the community in Hardington Mandeville, Somerset.
- Christopher Andrew Creevy. For services to the community in London.
- Lindsay Jane, Mrs. Cross. For services to the West End Refugee Service in Newcastle upon Tyne.
- Peter Jeremy Crouchley, Chief Engineer, Goodrich Corporation. For services to the Aerospace Industry.
- Gillian Margaret, Mrs. Cruddas, Chief Executive, Visit York. For services to the Tourist Industry.
- Eleanor Beryl, Mrs. Cryer. For services to People with Learning Disabilities in Slough, Berkshire.
- Miss Stephanie Ella Maureen Currie. For services to the City of London Corporation and to Charity.
- Group Captain John Phillip Dacre, D.L. For voluntary service to SSAFA Forces Help in Grampian.
- Russell Dacre, lately Director, Open Youth Trust, Norwich. For services to Young People.
- Jean Margaret Miller, Mrs. Dagnall. For services to the Clevedon and District Archaeological Society, Somerset.
- Malcolm Danby. For voluntary service to School Football in Teesside.
- Wendie, Mrs. Darlington, Director of Fundraising, Claire House Hospice. For charitable services in the North West.
- Robert Allen David. For services to the community in Tatsfield, Kent.
- Lieutenant Commander Donald William Wallace Davies, R.N. (Retd). For voluntary service to the Sea Cadet Corps.
- Paul Andrew Davies. For services to wheelchair rugby.
- Stephen John Dayman, Chief Executive, Meningitis UK. For services to Healthcare.
- George Frederick Denford, B.E.M. For services to the communities in Hartcliffe and Withywood, Bristol.
- Douglas Blair Denwette. For voluntary service to the community in Fife.
- Dharambir Singh Dhadyalla, Sitar Player and Teacher. For services to Indian Music.
- Sarup Singh Dhandia, Indian Artist. For services to Art in Leicester.
- Ms Carolyn Dhanraj, J.P. For services to the Public and Voluntary Sectors.
- Surinder Kaur, Mrs. Dhillon, Director, Southwark Race Equality Council. For services to Community Relations.
- Ronald Gardiner Dickie. For services to the community in Durham.
- Jim Dickson. For services to the community in Portadown, Northern Ireland.
- Ms Olywn Ditchburn, Programme Director, Leamington and Warwick West Children's Centres, Warwickshire. For services to Families.
- Raymond Frederick Harry Dixon, Clinical Nurse Specialist, Ministry of Defence.
- Shauna Mary, Mrs. Dixon, T.D., D.L., Deputy Chief Executive, NHS Oldham. For services to Healthcare.
- John Shaw Donaldson, lately Head of Immigration and Emergency Services, Glasgow City Council. For services to Local Government.
- Lesley, Mrs. Dooley, Senior Officer, Charity, Assets and Residence, Liverpool, H.M. Revenue and Customs.
- Margaret, Mrs. Douglas. For voluntary service to the Riding Group for the Disabled, South Hams.
- John Dumbleton, lately Honorary Company Secretary and Solicitor for the BLISS Charity. For services to Healthcare.
- Leonard William Dunbar, Senior Officer, H.M. Prison Whitemoor, Cambridgeshire, H.M. Prison Service, Ministry of Justice.
- Angela Joy, Mrs. Dupont, D.L., Chair, Yeovil District Hospital NHS Foundation Trust. For services to Healthcare.
- Selwyn Dafydd Eagle, lately Fish Culture Officer, Environment Agency Wales. For services to Conservation.
- Isabella McNair, Mrs. Edgar. For voluntary service to Highland and Scottish Country Dancing.
- Jill, Mrs. Edgington, Leader, International Wives' Group. For voluntary service to International Students.
- Bryan Kelsey Edgley. For services to the Agricultural Industry and to the community in Buckinghamshire.
- Madeline, Mrs. Edmonds, J.P. For services to the Arts and to the community in the Test Valley, Hampshire.
- Margaret Ann, Mrs. Edmunds, lately Area Manager, Road Haulage Association, Northern Region. For services to the Road Haulage Industry.
- Carolyn Tracy, Mrs. Edwards, Grade C1, Ministry of Defence.
- Jean Margot, Mrs. Edwards. For services to the Voluntary Sector.
- Raymond Sydney Edwards, Chief Executive Officer, Limbless Association. For services to disabled people.
- Suzanne, Mrs. Edwards. For services to the community in South Staffordshire.
- Caroline Margaret, Mrs. Elliott. For voluntary service to the Trinity Theatre in Royal Tunbridge Wells, Kent.
- Ian Frederick Elton, lately Deputy Head, National Dog and Technical Support Group, H.M. Prison Service, Ministry of Justice.
- Betty Cynthia, Mrs. Emmerson. For services to the community in Wells-next-the-Sea, Norfolk.
- Bernard Charles Engel. For services to the community in Hertfordshire.
- Dr. Andrew Entwistle, Member, Universities/Users Teaching and Research Action Partnership. For services to Higher Education.
- Teresa, Mrs. Esan, Director of Employability and Employer Engagement, City and Islington College, London. For services to Further Education.
- Bronwen, Mrs. Evans. For services to the Minsterley and District Eisteddfod and to the community in Minsterley, Shropshire.
- Maria Therese, Mrs. Evans. For services to Animal Health and to Wildlife Conservation in Pembrokeshire.
- Valerie Teresa, Mrs. Everitt. For services to the Women's Royal Voluntary Service.
- Gary John Fagg. For services to the community in New Romney, Kent.
- Miss Dorothy Fairburn, Regional Director, Country, Land and Business Association. For services to Rural Affairs in the Yorkshire and Humber Region.
- Roy Fairhead. For voluntary service to Ash Citizens' Advice Bureau, Surrey.
- Terence Farley. For services to Football Referees.
- Mary Anne, Mrs. Feakes. For services to the community in Garboldisham, Norfolk.
- Professor Peter Harold Fentem. For services to Stroke Medicine.
- Martin Ferris, Head, Clinical Audit and Effectiveness, NHS Sheffield. For services to the NHS.
- Charlotte, Mrs. Fielder, Higher Executive Officer, Heathrow Detection, UK Border Agency, Home Office.
- Ms Carlene Firmin, Senior Policy Officer, Race on the Agenda and Chief Executive Officer, Gag Project. For services to Girls' and Women's Issues.
- Dr. John Fish. For services to the Fishing Industry and to the Marine Environment.
- Dr. Terence Philip Flanagan, Landscape Artist. For services to Art internationally.
- Gillian Margaret, Mrs. Fletcher, Tutor, National Childbirth Trust. For services to Healthcare.
- The Reverend Margaret Fletcher. For services to the community in Thurstaston and in Irby, Wirral.
- Miss Jean Forbes Floodgate. For services to Continuing Professional Development.
- Carol, Mrs. Flower, Occupational Therapy Assistant, North Somerset Primary Care Trust. For services to Healthcare.
- Councillor David William Folkes. For services to the community in Broadway, Worcestershire.
- Patricia Ann, Mrs. Fordham, Chair, Phoenix Community Housing. For services to the community in the London Borough of Lewisham.
- Ian Forsyth. For voluntary service to the Royal British Legion Scotland.
- Constance Winifred, Mrs. Foster. For services to the community in the London Borough of Barking and Dagenham.
- John Foster, Chairman, Barnsley Work and Skills Board. For services to Unemployed People in South Yorkshire.
- Pauline, Mrs. Foster. For services to the community in Thixendale, North Yorkshire.
- Albert Francis. For charitable services in South Wales.
- Lesley Meriel, Mrs. Franklin, Leader, Stonehouse Gang Youth Group. For services to Young People in Weoley Castle, Birmingham.
- Raymond James French. For services to Rugby League.
- Brian Gardner, Head of Education Resources, North Ayrshire Council. For services to Education.
- David Neville Gentry, lately Safety Manager, Faculty of Science, Imperial College London. For services to Science.
- Robert William Gettings. For services to the community in Leeds, Yorkshire.
- Ms Kristina Glenn. For services to the community in the London Borough of Islington.
- Patricia Margaret, Mrs. Goldsmith. For services to the community in Hertford.
- Professor Joyce Goodman, Professor and Dean of Education, University of Winchester. For services to Higher Education.
- Lynn, Mrs. Goossens, Higher Executive Officer, Child Support Agency, Child Maintenance and Enforcement Commission, Department for Work and Pensions.
- Anthony David Gorham. For services to disabled people in Surrey.
- Ms Elizabeth Gosling, lately Operational Manager, Looked After Children's Planning, London Borough of Islington. For services to Local Government.
- Iain Grafton, Superintendent, Devon and Cornwall Constabulary. For services to the Police.
- Alny Mary, Mrs. Graham. For services to the Children's Hearings System in Scotland.
- Miss Ruth Ann Graham, Grade E1, Ministry of Defence.
- Lewis George Grant, Veterinary Manager, Meat Hygiene Service, Food Standards Agency.
- Amanda Jane, Mrs. Gray, Director, Eccleshall Biomass Ltd. For services to the Bioenergy Industry.
- Fenella Zoe, Mrs. Gray. For services to the community in Bampton, Oxfordshire.
- Ellen Dorothy, Mrs. Greaves. For services to the Heritage of Rochdale.
- Christopher Michael Green, Founder, Active Training and Education Trust. For voluntary service to Education.
- Lindsay Neil Green, Administrative Director, Medical Research Council Clinical Sciences Centre. For services to Science.
- Catherine, Mrs. Greenlees. For services to Christian Aid.
- Frederick Donald Patrick Greenslade. For services to Local Government in Cornwall.
- Ms Susan Gregson. For services to the community in the London Borough of Barnet.
- Pamela Jean, Mrs. Grethe. For services to the community in Hertford.
- Sylvia, Mrs. Grice. For services to Swimming and to the community in Ripon, North Yorkshire.
- John Henry Morgan Griffiths, Leader, St. Edmundsbury Borough Council. For services to Local Government in Suffolk.
- Frederick James Grounds, D.L. For voluntary service to the East Anglia Reserve Forces and Cadets Association.
- Gillian Mary Ellen, Mrs. Habbin. For services to the community in Ringwood, Hampshire.
- Brenda York, Mrs. Hackett, Marketing Director, Lindisfarne Ltd. For services to the Drinks Industry.
- Ann, Mrs. Hadfield. For services to the community in Bedford.
- Ms Jane Halestrap, Senior Executive Officer, Eco Towns Programme Team, Department for Communities and Local Government.
- Dr. Elizabeth Hall. For services to Healthcare and to the community in Colchester, Essex.
- Margaret Eleanor Yvonne, Mrs. Hall. For services to the community in Northern Ireland.
- Elizabeth, Mrs. Hamilton. For voluntary service to the Victoria and Albert Museum.
- Tony Hardiman, Chairman, National Insulation Association. For services to the Energy Industry.
- James William Harkness, Managing Director, North Lancashire Training Group Ltd. For services to Business and to Vocational Training.
- Phillip Harrison. For services to the British Sub Aqua Club.
- Jeanette, Mrs. Hart. For services to the community in North Birmingham.
- Morag Mary, Mrs. Hart, J.P., D.L. For voluntary service to Girlguiding in Scotland.
- Martyn Hastings. For services to The Duke of Edinburgh Award Scheme in Dorset and Kenya.
- Harry Collins Hatrick. For services to Heritage in Northern Ireland.
- Brian Michael Hazell. For charitable services overseas through the Suzy Fund.
- Donna Charmaine, Mrs. Henry. For services to the community in the London Borough of Lambeth.
- Barbara Mary, Mrs. Herdman, Secretary, League of Friends of the Berwick Hospitals. For voluntary service to Healthcare.
- Peter Herdman, Chairman, League of Friends of the Berwick Hospitals. For voluntary service to Healthcare.
- Debbie, Mrs. Hewitt, lately Non-Executive Director, Office of Government Commerce. For services to Business and to the Public Sector.
- Anthony William Higgs, Senior Executive Officer, Jobcentre Plus, Department for Work and Pensions.
- Graham High. For voluntary service to the Royal British Legion in Somerset.
- Dr. Brian William Hill, Head, School Engineering and Science, Northern Regional College. For services to Further Education and Training in Northern Ireland.
- Miss Sheila Hill. For services to Women's Cricket.
- Herman Hirschberger. For services to the Jewish community and the Kindertransport Evacuees.
- David Hitch. For services to Cumbria Constabulary.
- Michael Brett Hockney. For voluntary service to ABF The Soldiers' Charity.
- Anthony John Hodgkiss, Deputy Chairman, Pensions Advisory Service. For public service.
- Paula Audrey, Mrs. Holden. For services to the community in Wellington, Shropshire.
- Elizabeth Anne, Mrs. Hollins, School Crossing Warden, Warwickshire Council. For services to Education.
- Ms Lakshmi Holmstrom, Writer and Translator. For services to Literature.
- Pauline Jean, Mrs. Homeshaw. For services to the community in Wiveliscombe, Somerset.
- Councillor Brian Royston Hood, Monmouthshire County Council. For services to Local Government.
- Michael Howard Horan. For voluntary service to the Army Cadet Force in Surrey.
- Roger Malcolm Hosking. For services to Young People in HighFields Happy Hens Care Farm, Derbyshire.
- Councillor David William Houseman. For services to Local Government in Leicestershire.
- Alasdair Houston, Executive Chairman, Gretna Green Group. For services to the Tourist Industry in Dumfriesshire.
- Glenda, Mrs. Howells. For services to the Salvation Army and to the community in Maesteg and Port Talbot.
- Janet Mary, Mrs. Howitt. For services to People with Visual Impairment and to the community in Devon.
- Denis Colin Hoyes. For services to the community in Lincolnshire.
- Derek Reginald Spencer Huggett, Grade B2, Ministry of Defence.
- Mair, Mrs. Hughes. For services to the community in Morriston, Swansea.
- Mary Teresa, Mrs. Hughes, lately Executive Officer, Communities Group, Department for Communities and Local Government.
- Ann, Mrs. Humes. For services to the community in the North East.
- Matthew Humphreys, Chairman, EC1 New Deal for Communities Board. For services to the community in Central London.
- James Alexander Hunter, lately General-Secretary, Heathrow Operators Committee. For services to the Aviation Industry.
- Margaret, Mrs. Hunter. For services to the community in Thorpe Market, Norfolk.
- Yaqoob Hussain. For services to Young People in the North West.
- Peter Murray Irving. For services to the community in Drummore, Wigtownshire.
- Gordon Jackson. For services to the Scottish Ambulance Service and to the community in Hawick, Roxburghshire.
- Robert Jackson. For voluntary service to Cricket in the North East.
- Charles James. For services to the GMB Union and to the community in Leeds.
- Ms Elizabeth Meryl James, Band D, Transport and Strategic Regeneration Group, Department for the Economy and Transport, Welsh Assembly Government.
- Mary, Mrs. James. For services to the community in Tilsbury, Wiltshire.
- Sandra, Mrs. James. For services to Nursing in Guernsey and in the UK.
- Ms Jean Jarvis, Chief Executive, South Shropshire Furniture Scheme. For services to Social Enterprise.
- Linda Margaret, Mrs. Jasper, Founder and Director, Youth Dance England. For services to Dance.
- Michael Henry Jeffries. For voluntary service to Amateur Drama and to Charity in Tayside.
- Ivor Jess. For services to Disability Sport in Northern Ireland.
- Marcus Jewell. For services to the community in Plymouth, Devon.
- Peter Howard Jewell. For services to the community in Bodmin, Cornwall.
- John Martin Johnson, Briefing and Secretariat Manager, Child Support Agency, Child Maintenance and Enforcement Commission, Department for Work and Pensions.
- Professor Eric Raymond Johnson, Founder, Staffordshire Film Archive. For services to the Arts.
- Samuel Hague Johnson. For services to Hearing Impaired People in Tameside.
- David George Johnston. For public service.
- Iain Love Johnston. For services to the Hospitality and Tourist Industries in the Isle of Arran.
- Miss Margaret Irene Johnston, lately Administrator, Department of Earth Sciences, University of Cambridge. For services to Higher Education.
- Miss Carol Jane Cecilia Jones, Head of Flight Operations, Cobham Aviation Services. For services to the Defence Industry.
- David Walter Jones. For services to Ploughing in Wales.
- Ms Diana Jones. For services to Carers in the London Borough of Lewisham.
- Ms Donna Jones. For services to Young People in Sheffield.
- Gaye, Mrs. Jones, Foster Carer, Sefton Children's Services. For services to Families.
- Ian Jones. For services to the Royal National Lifeboat Institution in Llandudno, Gwynedd.
- Ms Linda Dorothy Jones, Faculty Senior Projects Manager and Operational Manager, Physics Department, Imperial College London. For services to Higher Education.
- Peter Jones, Foster Carer, Sefton Children's Services. For service to Families.
- Ruby Yun-Yuet, Mrs. Murray-Jones, Head, Hounslow Chinese School. For services to the Chinese community in the London Borough of Hounslow.
- Miss Sheelagh Lloyd Jones. For services to the NHS in Wales.
- Terence James Jones. For services to the community in Burton-upon-Trent, Staffordshire.
- Trevor Graham Lloyd Jones, Chief Executive, Young Bristol. For services to Young People.
- Professor Tudor Bowden Jones. For services to Science.
- Stephen Jordan, Watch Manager, Greater Manchester Fire and Rescue Service. For services to Operation Florian in Macedonia.
- Nobby Jutla, Constable, Hertfordshire Police. For services to the Police.
- Miss June Kelly, Learning Mentor, Temple Primary School, Manchester. For services to Education.
- Julius Elias Kennedy. For services to Business and to Social Cohesion in Sheffield.
- Beverley, Mrs. Kenny, Head of Catering and Event Management, University of Leeds. For services to Higher Education.
- Miss Susan Vida Kent, Vice-Chair, Aneurin Bevan Health Board. For services to the NHS.
- Barbara, Mrs. Kerr. For services to the community in West Derby, Liverpool.
- George Kerr. For services to Omagh Forum for Rural Associations in Northern Ireland.
- Joshua Kerr. For services to Pharmacy in Northern Ireland.
- Timothy Maurice Thomas Key, D.L. For services to Animal Health Research.
- Miss Joan Kingham. For services to the community in Dursley, Gloucestershire.
- Martin Cornelius Kinsella, Chief Executive, P3 Social Enterprise. For services to Disadvantaged People and to Ex-offenders.
- Peter Robert Seymour Knowles, Constable, Bedfordshire Police. For services to the Police.
- Dr. Sanjoy Kumar, General Medical Practitioner, East London. For services to the Police.
- Barry Spencer Laden. For services to the Fashion Industry.
- Lily, Mrs. Laing. For services to the Police and to the community in Edinburgh.
- Sharon, Mrs. Laing, Social Worker, Ministry of Defence.
- Ross William Lambert. For services to the community in the North East.
- Doris, Mrs. Langford. For voluntary service to the Royal National Lifeboat Institution in Norwich.
- Robert David Langrish, Equine Photographer. For services to Art.
- Ms Marai Larasi. For services to Black and Minority Ethnic Women.
- Susan Carmichael, Mrs. Large. For services to the Voluntary Support Service in Devon.
- Christopher John Larter. For voluntary service to Hackney Schools Athletic Association.
- Hilda, Mrs. Latimer, Caretaker, Lisnaskea High School, Fermanagh. For services to Education in Northern Ireland.
- Mark Sydney Law, Chief Executive Officer, Barca-Leeds. For services to Disadvantaged People in Leeds.
- Robert Law, Managing Director, Magmatic Ltd. For services to Business.
- Paul Phillip Le Boutillier. For voluntary service to Older People in Guernsey.
- Douglas Lee. For services to Stonebridge Adventure Playground and Brent Play Association, London.
- Glynis, Mrs. Lee. For services to Stonebridge Adventure Playground and Brent Play Association, London.
- Edwin Alfred Hugh Lello. For services to the Farming Industry in Cornwall.
- Ms Joanne Leng, Director, Business Development and Deputy Chief Executive, NO/Energy. For services to the Oil and Gas Industries.
- Lloyd Augustus Leon. For services to the community in the London Borough of Lambeth.
- Julia, Mrs. Lever, Founder, CHASE Children's Hospice Service. For services to Healthcare in South West London, Surrey and West Sussex.
- Ms Jennifer Ann Leyland. For services to Grass Roots Football in Merseyside.
- Stephen Lindsay, Assistant Divisional Officer, Gloucestershire Special Constabulary. For services to the Police.
- Ms Elizabeth Susan Lisgo. Chief Executive, Age Concern Somerset. For services to Older People.
- Brian Colin Litherland, Lecturer in Electrical Engineering, Castle College Nottingham. For services to Further Education.
- Gordon Maurice Littlewood. For services to the community in Handsworth, Sheffield.
- Anne, Mrs. Livingstone. For services to Community Theatre in Barnes, London Borough of Richmond- upon-Thames.
- Dr. David Edward Long, lately Director of Brewing, British Beer and Pub Association. For services to the Hospitality Industry.
- Peter Lowe. For services to Youth Justice in the North East.
- Keith Lucas, Founder, Street College, Oldham. For services to Young People.
- Ms Jane Lyddon, Head of International Relations, British Academy. For services in support of Scholarship.
- Pearl, Mrs. Mace. For services to Music in Hampshire.
- John Alexander MacKay. For services to the Royal Mail and to the community in Thurso, Sutherland.
- Dr. Elizabeth MacKenzie. For services to Museums.
- Kenneth MacLachlan. For voluntary service to SSAFA Forces Help in Dumfriesshire.
- Keith Douglas Madeley. For services to the community in Yorkshire.
- Pamela Leah, Mrs. Majaro. For voluntary service to Cavatina Chamber Music Trust.
- Professor Simon Majaro. For voluntary service to Cavatina Chamber Music Trust.
- Julia Sandra Ailsa, Mrs. Malkin, Approved Driving Instructor. For services to People with Special Needs.
- Keith Robert Mansell. For services to Gliding.
- Alistair Forbes Marquis, Assistant Chief Inspector, H.M. Inspectorate of Education, Scotland, Scottish Executive.
- Faith, Mrs. Marriott, Youth Justice Manager, Child ActionNorth West. For services to Families.
- Miss Judith Elaine Marsden, lately Senior Residential Officer Co-ordinator, Leeds Metropolitan University. For services to Higher Education.
- Dr. David Max Marsh. For voluntary service to Amateur Golf.
- Fiona Margaret, Mrs. Martin. For services to the community in Lincolnshire.
- Peter Joseph Martinelli. For services to Smithfield Market, City of London.
- Phyllis May, Mrs. Martyn. For services to St. John Ambulance and to the community in Ilfracombe, Devon.
- Miss Catriona Mason. For services to Lace Making.
- Bridget Catherine, Mrs. Matley, School Crossing Warden, Blackpool, Lancashire. For services to Education.
- Darren John Matthews. For voluntary service to the Samaritans in South Wales.
- Susan Mary, Mrs. Matthews, Administrative Officer, Pension, Disability and Carers' Service, Department for Work and Pensions.
- John Maxwell, First Chairman of Board of Governors, Enniskillen Integrated Primary School. For voluntary service to Education in Northern Ireland.
- Bede McCabe, Sergeant, Northumbria Police. For services to the Police.
- Arnold Don McClay, President, Londonderry Boys' Brigade. For services to Young People in Northern Ireland.
- Rosalie Anne Frances, Mrs. McCluskey. For services to the community in Drongan, East Ayrshire.
- Joyce Margaret, Mrs. McCormick, lately Senior Professional and Technical Officer, Northern Ireland Environment Agency, Northern Ireland Executive.
- Adrian McCrudden, Administrative Officer, Jobcentre Plus, Department for Work and Pensions.
- Miss Fiona Margaret McCulloch, Grade C1, Ministry of Defence.
- Graeme McDowell. For services to Golf.
- Helen Gwendoline, Mrs. McFadden. For services to the community in Dromore, Northern Ireland.
- Eric George McGlen. For services to the community in Sunderland North East, and Overseas.
- Mary Elizabeth, Mrs. McGuiness, Instructor, Clippens School, Linwood, Paisley. For services to Special Needs Education.
- James McIlroy. For services to Football and to Charity.
- Ann, Mrs. McKay, International Student Adviser, University of Edinburgh. For services to Higher Education.
- Sean Michael McKenna. For public service.
- James McKillop. For voluntary service to People with Dementia in Scotland.
- Ms Gillian McKinnon, Senior Personal Assistant, H.M. Treasury.
- Moira Frances, Mrs. McKirdy. For services to Science Education in the Community School of Auchterarder, Perth and Kinross.
- William McLachlan, Safety, Health and Environmental Adviser, BAE Systems. For charitable services.
- William McMurray, Salvation Army Envoy. For services to the community in Stirling.
- Kevin McRandle. For voluntary service to the RAF Association.
- Gillian, Mrs. McVicar, General Manager, Mid- Highland Community Health Partnership. For services to the NHS in Scotland.
- Miss Eileen Yvonne Meacock, Founder, Richmond Academy of Dance. For services to Dance.
- Dr. Tracey Menzies. For services to Women's Hockey.
- Maureen Ellen, Mrs. Messer. For services to the community in Lewes, East Sussex.
- Susan Mary, Mrs. Meyer. For services to the community in Little Hallingbury, Hertfordshire.
- Miss Angella Patricia Mighty. For voluntary service to Derby West Indian Community Association.
- Dorothy Dearmer, Mrs. Mills. For services to the community in Harpenden, Hertfordshire.
- Alan Mitchell, Community Safety Co-ordinator, Sunderland City Council. For services to Local Government.
- Bernadette, Mrs. Montgomery. For services to the Cancer Lifeline Charity in Northern Ireland.
- Toni Montinaro. For services to Lesbian, Gay, Bisexual and Transgender People in Derbyshire.
- John Moore. For services to Business in Belfast.
- Thomas Moran, Professional Standards Co-ordinator, Police Superintendents' Association of England and Wales. For services to the Police.
- Sylvia, Mrs. Morris. For voluntary service to Minchinhampton Centre for the Elderly in Gloucestershire.
- Margaret Joy, Mrs. Morse. For services to the community in Chapel Allerton, Somerset.
- Keith Robert Mosley, Grade C2, Ministry of Defence.
- Margaret, Mrs. Mullen, School Crossing Warden, Dysart Primary School, Fife. For services to Education.
- Miss Rosalind Munday, Occupational Therapist, Royal Hospital for Neuro-disability. For services to Healthcare.
- Neil Munslow, Housing Services Manager, Newcastle upon Tyne City Council. For services to Local Government.
- Dennis Murphy. For services to Royal Mail and to the Voluntary Sector.
- Dr. Derek Murphy, President, Merlin Project. For services to People with Multiple Sclerosis in Cornwall.
- John Murphy. For services to Health and Safety in the Construction Industry.
- Alan David Murray. For services to Deaf People.
- John Murray, Grade B2, Ministry of Defence.
- Paul Murray, Head of Community Cohesion, Isle of Sheppey Academy, Kent. For services to Education.
- John Nash. For services to the community in Castleford, West Yorkshire.
- Dr. Susheila Nasta, Founder and Editor, Wasafiri. For services to Black and Asian Literature.
- Josephine Pearl, Mrs. Naylor. For voluntary service to the community in Essex.
- Jacqueline, Mrs. Naysmith. For voluntary service to the War Widows' Association.
- Miss Deborah Lynn Neal, Archives Officer, Knowledge and Information Management, Cabinet Office.
- Rita Kathleen, Mrs. Nicholls. For services to the community in Lutterworth, Leicestershire.
- Raymond Nichols, J.P., Chairman of Governors, Almondbury High School, Kirklees. For voluntary service to Education.
- Alasdair Nicholson. For services to the Voluntary Sector in the Western Isles.
- Janice, Mrs. Nightingale. For voluntary service to Safer Cycling in Cambridgeshire.
- Roger Richard Nightingale. For services to the community in Weston-super-Mare, Somerset.
- Julie Elaine, Mrs. Noakes. For services to the community in Bradfield, Berkshire.
- Pauleen, Mrs. Norman. For services to the community in Aberdour, Fife.
- Pamela Irene, Mrs. Norton. For services to the community in the London Borough of Sutton.
- Ms Anne Patricia Novis. For services to disabled people in London.
- James Joseph O'Connor. For services to the community in Warrington, Cheshire.
- Jean Elizabeth, Mrs. O'Donnell. For services to the community in Herefordshire.
- Kevin Christopher O'Keeffe, Grade C1, Ministry of Defence.
- Susan, Mrs. O'Neill, Flood Risk Manager, Environment Agency. For services to Flood Defence in Yorkshire and to North East.
- Ms Beatrix Ong, Shoe Designer. For services to the Fashion Industry.
- David Ovadia, Director of International Activities, British Geological Survey. For services to Science.
- Captain Christopher Leslie William Page (Retd), Grade B2, Ministry of Defence.
- Philip James Parker, Technical Support Unit Manager, Thames Valley Police. For services to the Police.
- Stephen Parker. For charitable services.
- Charles David Partridge. For services to the community in Walsall, West Midlands.
- Babubhai Patel. For services to the community in Tipton, West Midlands.
- Lina, Mrs. Patel. For services to Black and Minority Ethnic Carers.
- Umeshchandra Babubhai Patel, Community Pharmacist. For services to Healthcare in Sunderland, Tyne and Wear.
- Vimla, Mrs. Patel. For services to Asian and Hindu People in Cardiff.
- Dr. Ashok Pathak. For services to Medicine in the East Riding of Yorkshire and in India.
- Agnes, Mrs. Paul, lately Officer, Charities Assets and Residence, Nottingham, H.M. Revenue and Customs.
- Terry Pauley, Business Improvement and Support Process Manager, Local Taxation, London, H.M. Revenue and Customs.
- David Sinclair Pearson, Executive Director of Clinical Governance and Nursing, North Staffordshire Combined Healthcare NHS Trust. For services to Mental Healthcare.
- Malcolm David Pearson, Chief Officer, Special Constabulary Norfolk. For services to the Police.
- Arnold Paul Pease. For services to the community in Cheadle Hulme, Greater Manchester.
- Richard William Penny, Director, Watershed Media Centre. For services to the Creative Industries in Bristol.
- Sarita Day, Mrs. Perkins. For services to Chiverton Riding for the Disabled Association and to the community in Cornwall.
- Ms Lorraine Phelan, Staff Side Chair, Imperial College Healthcare NHS Trust. For services to the NHS.
- Karen, Mrs. Phillips. For services to the Jewish community in Manchester.
- Grahame Pickering, Chief Executive, Great North Air Ambulance Service. For services to Emergency Healthcare.
- Miss Kathleen Rhoda Pitt. For services to the community in Petersfield, Hampshire.
- Aslie Pitter. For voluntary service to Stonewall Football Club.
- John Bernard Plain. For services to Athletics.
- Paul Arthur Playford. For services to the community in Tivetshall St. Mary and Margaret, and Dickleburgh, Norfolk.
- Alan Robert Pluck, lately Chairman, SEEVIC College, Benfleet, Essex. For voluntary service to Education.
- Robert Stanley Poots, lately Principal, Dromara Primary School, Dromore. For services to Education in Northern Ireland.
- Rubina Mary, Mrs. Porter. For services to the community in Liverpool and Bangladesh.
- Ms Lisa Power. For services to sexual health and to the Lesbian, Gay, Bisexual and Transgender community.
- Margaret, Mrs. Prime. For services to the community in Rivenhall, Essex.
- Annie Morwen, Mrs. Pugh, Musical Director and Conductor, Cor Meibion Talgarth. For services to Music in Powys.
- Jane, Mrs. Pugh, Governance Officer, London School of Economics and Political Science. For services to Higher Education.
- Betty, Mrs. Radford. For services to the community in Wonford, Devon.
- Dr. Katy Radford. For services to Community Relations in Northern Ireland.
- Adil Rajput, Executive Officer, Jobcentre Plus, Department for Work and Pensions.
- Dr. Jacques Rangasamy, Senior Lecturer, University of Salford. For services to Multicultural Arts Education.
- Leonard Rawle, Organist. For services to Music.
- Alexis Jane, Mrs. Redmond. For services to the community in Merseyside.
- Raymond Leslie Rees. For services to Coracle Heritage and Inland Water Fishing in Wales.
- Ms Caroline Reeson, lately Managing Director, Brokerage Citylink. For services to Disadvantaged People in London.
- John George Sinclair Rendall. For services to the community in Hoy and Walls, Orkney.
- Ms Jayne-Marie Richards, Detective Constable, Hertfordshire Police. For services to the Police.
- Leroy Richards, Manager, Bosworth Drive Community Centre. For services to Community Cohesion in the West Midlands.
- Maureen, Mrs. Richards. For voluntary service to Mountain Rescue in Cumbria.
- Gerard Paul Richardson. For services to the Tourist Industry and to the community in Whitehaven, Cumbria.
- Janet Cecilia, Mrs. Richardson. For services to Education and to the community in Nottingham.
- Ivor Rickard, lately Salvation Army Chaplain, H.M. Young Offenders' Institution Aylesbury. For charitable services.
- Leyland Bradshaw Ridings, Lead Council Member for Children's Services, Kent County Council. For services to Local Government.
- Anthony Charles Roberts, Leader, Newark and Sherwood District Council. For services to Local Government in Nottinghamshire.
- Susan, Mrs. Roberts, Chair of the Board, Wolverhampton Homes. For voluntary service to Social Housing.
- Frederick Howard Robinson, Field Service Engineer, BAE Systems. For services to the Defence Industry.
- Roy Robert Robinson. For public service.
- Derek Harry Rosenberg, lately Head of Physical Education, London Academy, Edgware. For services to Physical Education in the London Borough of Barnet.
- Ronald Ross. For services to Shinty in Scotland.
- Marion Kathleen, Mrs. Rowland. For services to Young People and to the community in Harwich, Essex.
- Sheila Margaret, Mrs. Royle. For services to the Independent Monitoring Board, H.M. Prison Altcourse, Liverpool.
- Martin Rumsey, Parliamentary Select Committee Liaison Officer, Science and Research Group, Department for Business, Innovation and Skills.
- Patricia, Mrs. Russell. For services to the community in Portsmouth, Hampshire.
- Agha Sadiq. For services to Young People.
- Helen Mary, Mrs. Sage, lately Programme Co-ordinator, City of Bristol College. For services to Further Education.
- John Raymond Sandy. For services to the community in Godalming, Surrey.
- Dr. Katie Petty-Saphon, Director, Medical Schools Council, Dental Schools Council and Association of UK University Hospitals. For services to Medicine.
- Dr. Kay Saunders, General Medical Practitioner. For services to Healthcare and to Homeless People in Cardiff.
- Guy James Schanschieff, Managing Director, Bambino Mio. For services to Business.
- Julius Strathmore Schofield. For services to the Fashion and Textile Industries.
- Sylvia Doreen, Mrs. Sercombe. For voluntary service to H.M. Prison Ranby, Nottinghamshire.
- Chauhdry Mohammed Shafique. For services to Community Cohesion in High Wycombe, Buckinghamshire.
- Ratilal Devchand Shah. For services to the Indian community in London.
- Ian David Shanley, ICT General Manager, Scottish Ambulance Service. For services to Emergency Healthcare.
- Dr. Satya Vrat Sharma, General Medical Practitioner, Wolverhampton, West Midlands. For services to Healthcare.
- Evelyn Audrey, Mrs. Sharp. For services to the Mountain Rescue in Cumbria. community in Cheddington, Leighton Buzzard.
- Catherine Elizabeth, Mrs. Shaw. For services to the community in Chichester, West Sussex.
- Frederick Charles Shaw. For voluntary service to Boxing and to the community in Alderney, Channel Islands.
- Stephen Simmons. For services to Dental Healthcare in North London.
- Margaret, Mrs. Simpson. For services to Social Enterprise and to the community in the Scottish Borders.
- William James Simpson, J.P. For services to Horticulture and to the community in Worcestershire.
- Ronald Spence Sinclair, Managing Director, Baseefa Ltd. For services to Certification Standards.
- Lynda Collette, Mrs. Slack, Higher Executive Officer, Child Support Agency, Child Maintenance and Enforcement Commission, Department for Work and Pensions.
- Alexander Slater, Senior Superintendent, Royal National Mission to Deep Sea Fishermen. For services to the Fishing Industry in Northern Ireland.
- Graham Smallbone, Chairman of Governors, Purcell School, Bushey, Hertfordshire. For voluntary service to Music Education.
- Anthony Peter Smith. For services to Special Needs Children and Young People in Leicestershire.
- Roberta Ruth, Mrs. Smith. For services to the community in Southampton, Hampshire.
- Professor Ronald Andrew Smith, Professor of Exercise and Sport, York St. John University. For services to Higher Education and to Community Sport.
- Susan Elizabeth Christine, Mrs. Dudley-Smith. For services to the Riding for Disabled Association and to the community in Thorganby, North Yorkshire.
- Thomas David Smith. For services to People Addicted to Drugs.
- Elizabeth, Mrs. Soars. For services to the Teaching of English as a Foreign Language.
- John Soars. For services to the Teaching of English as a Foreign Language.
- Gillian, Mrs. Southern, Director, Wessington Cryogenics Ltd. For services to Industry in the North East.
- Simon Charles Southworth, Service Manager, Kent County and Medway Council Substance Misuse Care Management Service. For services to Healthcare.
- William Elwyn Robert Soutter, lately Her Majesty's Inspector, UK Border Agency, Home Office.
- John Leslie Sparkes, Chairman, Autism Anglia. For voluntary service to Special Needs Education and Adult Services.
- Vivienne Nancy, Mrs. Spratt. For services to the community in Littlebourne, Kent.
- Julie, Mrs. Stamper, Founder, Schoolgirl Mums' Unit. For services to Education.
- Kenneth Staveley. For services to the community in Kirby Irelth and Ulverston, Cumbria.
- Elaine, Mrs. Stephen, Director, Red Island Ltd. For services to Child Safety.
- Lorna, Mrs. Stephens. For services to Hounslow Youth Service.
- Miss Prudence Ann Stern. For services to the community in Dorking, Surrey.
- Kathleen, Mrs. Stevens. For services to Education and to the community in Kirk Ireton, Derbyshire.
- Councillor Desline Maud Stewart. For services to Local Government in Luton, Bedfordshire.
- Eugene Patrick Stewart. For services to Young People in Northern Ireland.
- Edna Sylvia, Mrs. Stinchcombe. For services to Youth Justice in Bristol.
- Stephen Paul Stockton. For voluntary service to the Samaritans in South Wales.
- Julia Ann, Mrs. Styles, lately Head of Nursing, Blaeuau Gwent Local Health Board. For services to Healthcare in South Wales.
- Pamela Charlotte Emily, Mrs. Surphlis. For services to the community in Northern Ireland.
- Eric Sutherns, Bridge Master, Tower Bridge. For services to the City of London Corporation.
- William Albert Swinford. For services to the community in Evington, Leicester.
- The Reverend Thomas William Tait. For voluntary service to the Air Training Corps.
- Sharon, Mrs. Tavendale, Administrative Assistant, Accounts Office, Shipley, H.M. Revenue and Customs.
- Brian Taylor, J.P. For services to the community in North Lincolnshire.
- Ms Doris Telfer. For voluntary service to Save the Children in Broughty Ferry, Dundee.
- Ms Alice Temperley, Designer. For services to the Fashion Industry.
- Simon Paul Terry, Executive Officer, Child Support Agency, Child Maintenance and Enforcement Commission, Department for Work and Pensions.
- Urmila, Mrs. Thakkar. For services to the community in North West London.
- Ms Gaye Thomas, Librarian, London Borough of Barking and Dagenham. For services to Local Government.
- Pauline, Mrs. Thomas, Manager, Lloyd Park Centre, Walthamstow, London. For services to Families.
- Rodney Mackie Iven Thomas, Chairman of Governors, Holy Trinity Church of England Primary School, Ramsgate. For voluntary service to Education.
- Alison Jane, Mrs. Thompson. For services to Homeless People in Hampshire.
- Eric Thomson. For voluntary service to Sport in Haslemere, Surrey.
- Ms Jacinta Mary Thorley. For services to Rural Affairs in the South East.
- Helen Louise, Mrs. Gill-Thwaites, Occupational Therapist, Royal Hospital for Neuro-disability. For services to Healthcare.
- David Peter Tibbot. For services to the community in Llandrillo, Denbighshire.
- Rosemary, Mrs. Tocock. For services to the community in Berkshire.
- Michael John Benjamin Todhunter, D.L. For services to Special Needs Education and to the community in Berkshire.
- Doreen Lilian, Mrs. Tozer, Chair of Governors, Dunstone Primary School and Vice-Chair of Governors, Stuart Road Primary School, Plymouth. For voluntary service to Education.
- June, Mrs. Tracey, Chair, Xaverian College, Manchester. For voluntary service to Education.
- Ms Emily Anne Travis. For public service.
- Norma, Mrs. Trotter. For services to the community in Elland, West Yorkshire.
- Derek Andreani Truffas, Clerk to the Corporation, Ashton Sixth Form College, Ashton-under-Lyne. For services to Education.
- Charles Knight Tulloch. For voluntary service to the Royal National Lifeboat Institution in Kinghorn, Fife.
- Jacqueline Anne, Mrs. Turnbull, lately Deputy Chair, General Teaching Council for Wales. For services to Education.
- Peter Turner. For voluntary service to the Parkinson's Disease Society in Banbury, Oxfordshire.
- Rupert Lennox Tyson, Chairman, Hackney Homes Board. For services to the Housing Sector in the London Borough of Hackney.
- Thomas Peter Usborne, Managing Director, Usborne Publishing Ltd. For services to the Publishing Industry.
- Patricia, Mrs. Vales, lately Consultant Clinical Scientist, Manchester Royal Infirmary. For services to Healthcare.
- William Gareth Vaughan, President, Farmers' Union of Wales. For services to Agriculture.
- Ms Pam Vedhara, South Tyneside Youth Offending Service Manager. For services to Local Government.
- Jeffrey Vickers, Photographer. For services to the Creative Industries.
- Keith Wainwright. For services to the Hairdressing Industry.
- Peter Michael Walker. For services to Cricket.
- Angela, Mrs. Wallace. For voluntary service to Cossington Primary School, Leicestershire.
- Arthur William Waller, J.P. For services to the community in Merseyside.
- Professor Ian Douglas Walsh. For services to Highway Engineering.
- Jennifer, Mrs. Ward. For services to Young People and to the community in Leeds.
- Margaret, Mrs. Ward. For services to the community in Slaley, Northumberland.
- Sheila, Mrs. Warner. For services to the Agricultural Industry and to Charity in North East Wales.
- Jackie Patricia, Mrs. Waterhouse. For voluntary service to Catering and to Local Government in Salisbury, Wiltshire.
- Miss Anna Watson, Senior Archivist, Lancashire Record Office. For services to Local Government.
- Miss Gina Watson. For services to the community in Littlehampton, West Sussex.
- Christopher John George Webb. For voluntary service to the Scouts in Romford, London Borough of Havering.
- Howard Melton Webb, Referee. For services to Football.
- Marjorie, Mrs. Wedge. For services to Older People in Wolverhampton.
- Dr. Richard John West, General Medical Practitioner, Suffolk. For services to Healthcare.
- Patricia Sandra, Mrs. Weston. For services to Early Years Education in Little Thornton, Lancashire.
- Neil Whitaker. For voluntary service to the Royal British Legion.
- Miss Kathleen May White. For services to the Post Office and the community in Claverley, Wolverhampton.
- May Kathleen, Mrs. White. For services to the community in the London Borough of Brent.
- Mollie, Mrs. White, Chair of Governors, Lantern's Nursery School and Children's Centre, Winchester, Hampshire. For voluntary service to Education.
- Maisie, Mrs. Ringham-Wiggins, Trombonist. For services to Music.
- Brendan Wilkinson. For services to Young People in Northern Ireland.
- Ian David Wilkinson. For services to the community in East Williamston, Tenby, Pembrokeshire.
- Doris, Mrs. Willan. For services to the community in Bolton.
- Audrey Francis Joy, Mrs. Williams, Chairman, Education and Events Committee, Devon Gardens Trust. For services to Children.
- David John Williams. For services to Forestry, Arboriculture and to the community in Powys.
- Dr. David Richard Williams. For services to Media Studies in the North East.
- Ms Doris-Ann Williams, Director-General, British In Vitro Diagnostics Association. For services to the Healthcare Industry.
- Ms Joyce Williams. For services to Clifton Park Museum, Rotherham.
- Ms Dorothy Wilson, Artistic Director and Chief Executive, Midlands Art Centre. For services to the Arts.
- Jean Ann, Mrs. Wilson. For services to the community in Little Aston, Staffordshire.
- Lesley, Mrs. Wilson, People Officer, Customer Operations, Thornaby, North Yorkshire, H.M. Revenue and Customs.
- Malcolm Francis Wilson. For services to the community in Nottingham.
- Margaret Cynthia, Mrs. Wilson. Foster Carer. For services to Families in Northern Ireland.
- Robert Delmore Wilson, lately Regional Manager, Glasgow, Identity and Passport Service, Home Office.
- Adam Kenneth Wilton. For services to the UK Antarctic Heritage Trust.
- The Reverend Canon Pamela Margaret Wise, Chair of Trustees, Ascend Project. For services to the community in South Oxhey, Hertfordshire.
- John Michael Wood, Community Ranger, Forestry Commission.
- Margaret, Mrs. Wood, Managing Director, ICW (UK) Ltd. For services to Business in Yorkshire and the Humber Region.
- Martin Paul Woodley, Doorstep Crime Team Leader, Oxfordshire County Council. For services to Local Government.
- George Daniel Woodman, Parliamentary Librarian, Research and Library Service, Northern Ireland Assembly.
- Neil Woodmansey. For services to the UK International Search and Rescue.
- Professor Phillip Leslie Woodworth, Scientific Leader, National Oceanography Centre, Liverpool. For services to Science.
- John Lloyd Wynne, Welsh Translation and Quality Manager, Customer Contact Directorate, Cardiff, H.M. Revenue and Customs.
- Chelliah Yogamoorthy, Lead Quantity Surveyor, Highways Agency, Department for Transport.
- Captain Roy Antony Zaman (Retd), Grade C2, Ministry of Defence.
- Dr. Marjorie Esther Ziff. For services to the community in Leeds.

=== Royal Red Cross ===
==== Royal Red Cross (Second Class) (ARRC) ====
Royal Navy

- Chief Petty Officer Naval Nurse Louise Stephanie Speller, QARNNS

Royal Air Force

- Flight Lieutenant Anthony Whinton Nicol

=== Queen's Police Medal (QPM) ===
England and Wales

- Ian Arundale
- Steven Richard Armstead
- Hamish Campbell
- Dominic Victor Clout
- Robert Charles Dyson
- Julian Grant
- Roderick Charles Jarman
- David Kelly
- Helen King
- Neil Kinrade
- Christina Maria Wilson-Law
- Stephen Love
- Ivor John MacGregor
- Brian Arthur McNeill
- Janet Molloy
- Joseph Murray
- Andrew John Walker Parker
- Mark Rowley

Scotland

- Ian MacLeod
- Neil Allan Richardson
- Kevin Smith

Northern Ireland

- Linda Elizabeth Baird
- Tim Hanley
- Paul Hannigan

=== Queen's Fire Service Medal (QFSM) ===
England and Wales

- John Anthony Boyce
- Richard Hannigan
- Robert Neil Proudfoot

Scotland

- James Reid Clark
- David Smith

Northern Ireland

- Briant Thompson McClintock

=== The Queen's Volunteer Reserves Medal (QVRM) ===
Army

- Sergeant Robert Colin Michael Burns
- Captain Shaun David Lamming
- Major Michael Paul Rowe
- Lieutenant Colonel Colin Louis Shieff, TD

=== Colonial Police Medal (CPM) ===
- Keithly Valentine Benjamim, Royal Anguilla Police Service
- Joseph Anthony Gomez, Royal Gibraltar Police

== Crown Dependencies ==
=== The Most Excellent Order of the British Empire ===
==== Officer of the Order of the British Empire (OBE) ====
Jersey

- Frank Walker, for public services in Jersey

Isle of Man

- Alex Downie, for public services in the Isle of Man
- John Taylor, for services to business and horology.

==== Member of the Order of the British Empire (MBE) ====
Guernsey

- Paul Le Boutillier, for voluntary services to the elderly and to the care of sufferers from Alzheimer's
- Sandra James, for services to nursing and health care in Guernsey and the UK
- Frederick Shaw, for voluntary services to Youth and the wider community in Alderney

Isle of Man

- Jean Buck for services to wildlife and conservation in the Island

=== Lieutenant of the Royal Victorian Order (LVO) ===
Guernsey

- Colonel Richard Graham MBE, for services to the Queen.

== Cook Islands ==
=== The Most Excellent Order of the British Empire ===
Civil Division

==== Officer of the Order of the British Empire (OBE) ====
- Mata Andrew Turua Pamatatau. For public service and services to the community.

==== Member of the Order of the British Empire (MBE) ====
- Gillian, Mrs. Vaiimene. For public service and services to the community.

==== British Empire Medal ====
Civil Division

- Moeroa, Mrs. John Koteka. For public service and services to the community.
- Tekura, Mrs. Purea. For public service and services to the community.

== Grenada ==
=== The Most Excellent Order of the British Empire ===
Civil Division

==== Officer of the Order of the British Empire (OBE) ====
- James Clarkson. For public service.
- Ms Merle Collins. For services to education and literature.

==== Member of the Order of the British Empire (MBE) ====
- Martin Danny Clement. For public service and services to education.
- Ms Suzanne Gaywood. For services to tourism and horticulture.

==== British Empire Medal ====
Civil Division

- Samuel J. Britton. For services to education and the community.

== Solomon Islands ==
=== The Most Excellent Order of the British Empire ===
Civil Division

==== Officer of the Order of the British Empire (OBE) ====
- Ms Esther Lelapitu. For services to the Church, the community and the Government of the Solomon Islands.

==== Member of the Order of the British Empire (MBE) ====
- Ms Delilah Tago Biti. For services to the community, the Church and Charity development.

=== Queen's Police Medal (QPM) ===
- Walford Keto Devi. For services to the Royal Solomon Islands Police Force.

== Tuvalu ==
=== The Most Excellent Order of the British Empire ===
Civil Division

==== Officer of the Order of the British Empire (OBE) ====
- Laloniu Samuelu, MBE For services to the public and the community.

==== Member of the Order of the British Empire (MBE) ====
- Nalu Nia. For services to the public and the community.
- Lasela, Mrs. Panapa. For services to the public and the community.

=== British Empire Medal ===
Civil Division

- Kiliuli Iosia. For services to the public and the community.
- ImoMalo. For services to the public and the community.
- Faleefa, Mrs. Tala. For services to the public and the community.

== Saint Vincent and the Grenadines ==
=== The Most Distinguished Order of Saint Michael and Saint George ===
==== Companion of the Order of Saint Michael and Saint George (CMG) ====
- Rene Mercedes, Mrs. Baptiste. For services to the law, international finance, culture and politics.

=== The Most Excellent Order of the British Empire ===
==== Officer of the Order of the British Empire (OBE) ====
Civil Division

- Pastor Dermoth Cosmore Baptiste. For services to the Christian fellowship and to the community.
- Bernard Oswald Morgan. For services to public administration.

==== Member of the Order of the British Empire (MBE) ====
- Winston Godwin Bacchus. For services to teaching and education.
- Ms Germaine Monica Rose. For services to early childhood education and to the community.
- Robert Adolphus Sandy. For services to the Police, the law, and consumer affairs.

== Antigua and Barbuda ==
=== The Most Excellent Order of the British Empire ===
==== Officer of the Order of the British Empire (OBE) ====
- Peecheta Spencer, for services to education

==== Member of the Order of the British Empire (MBE) ====
- Cornelia N. Michael, BEM, for public service

== Saint Christopher and Nevis ==
=== The Most Excellent Order of the British Empire ===
==== Commander of the Order of the British Empire (CBE) ====
- Doctor Joseph Christmas, for public and diplomatic service

==== Member of the Order of the British Empire (MBE) ====
- Clara Lorna Walters, for public service

== Gibraltar ==
=== The Most Excellent Order of The British Empire ===
==== Member of the Order of the British Empire (MBE) ====
- Isobel Ellul-Hammond, for services to the community in Gibraltar
