= Andrew Goudie =

Andrew Goudie may refer to:

- Andrew Goudie (geographer) (1945–2026), British geographer
- Andrew Goudie (economist) (born 1955), Chief Economic Adviser to the Scottish Government

== See also ==
- Goudie (surname)
