= Carlene Firmin =

British sociologist (born 1983/4)

Carlene Firmin MBE (born 1983 or 1984) is a British social researcher and writer specialising in violence between and against young people, creator of the concept Contextual Safeguarding, and founder of the MsUnderstood Partnership. She is a professor of sociology at Durham University.

== Early life and education ==
Firmin attended St Michael's Catholic Grammar School in Barnet, London. She has a B.A. in philosophy from Fitzwilliam College, University of Cambridge, and an M.Sc. in social policy and planning from the London School of Economics. She has a professional doctorate from the University of Bedfordshire for which her thesis was "Peer on peer abuse: safeguarding implications of contextualising abuse between young people within social fields" (2015).

== Career ==
Firmin was senior policy officer at Race on the Agenda (ROTA), and founded the GAG project (Girls Against Gangs, or Girls Affected by Gangs, or Gendered Action on Gangs). She has held positions of assistant director of policy and research at Barnardos, specialising in youth justice and sexual exploitation of children; principal policy adviser at the Office of the Children's Commissioner; and head of the secretariat for the Inquiry into Child Sexual Exploitation in Groups and Gangs.

Between 2011 and 2014 she wrote a regular column "Girl in the Corner" in The Guardian.

In 2013 she founded the MsUnderstood Partnership, a joint project between Girls in Gangs, Imkaan and the University of Bedfordshire. The project "aims to improve local and national responses to young people’s experiences of inequality".

Firmin is the founder of the concept Contextual Safeguarding, which is concerned with safeguarding adolescents from risk outside their family homes. Firmin was until 2021 a senior research fellow in the Institute of Applied Research of the Department of Applied Social Studies at the University of Bedfordshire. In September 2021 she became a professor of sociology at Durham University, one of only 40 female black professors in the UK and one of the youngest ever appointed. She is head of the Contextual Safeguarding team there.

== Awards ==
Firmin was awarded an MBE in the 2011 New Year Honours for "services to girls' and women's issues", and was the youngest black woman to have received this honour.
