= Joseph McNally =

Joseph McNally is the name of:

- Joseph McNally (brother) (1923–2002), Irish brother of the De La Salle Brothers
- Joseph McNally (businessman) (1942–2012), British businessman
