= Ashok Jivraj Rabheru =

British businessman (1952–2022)

Sir Ashok Jivraj Rabheru KCVO DL
- Born: 6 April 1952; Morogoro, Tanganyika
- Died: 23 December 2022 (aged 70)
- Education: University College London (B.Sc.); Royal Holloway, University of London (M.Phil.)
- Occupation: Chairman of Genisys Group
- Spouse: Harshida Jivraj Rabheru (m. 1980)

Sir Ashok Jivraj Rabheru KCVO DL (6 April 1952 – 23 December 2022) was a British businessman. He was the chairman of Genisys Group. He served as a trustee for the Duke of Edinburgh's Award from 2000 to 2010, and was a core member of the steering group to raise funds for its Golden Jubilee anniversary in 2006. He was chairman of the joint funding board for UK and international engagements.

== Early life and education ==
Rabheru was born in Morogoro, Tanzania, the ninth of ten children of Raliat and Jivraj. His father was originally from Gujarat, India.

In 1967, Rabheru emigrated to the United Kingdom when he was 15 years old. Rabheru studied at Kingston College and earned his degree from University College London in (B.Sc.). He also held an (M.Phil.) from Royal Holloway, University of London in Applied Mathematics.

== Career ==
Rabheru started his IT career by forming Genisys Group in the year 1985 with just 5 employees and today the company has grown to be a global IT services provider with 1000+ employees. Over the last three decades, the company has helped enterprises reimagine their businesses in the digital world, by offering comprehensive IT solutions backed with experience, commitment and strategy.

The company was founded in the United Kingdom in 1993 as a family-run value-added reseller of hardware and software solutions. Over time, it expanded into enterprise technology services, focusing on cloud, data, artificial intelligence, and digital transformation. Following its integration into Bandhan Group, the business was rebranded as Bandhan Technologies, with Rabheru's vision of using technology to solve real business problems continuing to shape the organisation's direction.

== Social and charitable work ==
Rabheru served as a Trustee for DofE from 2000 to 2010 and was the core member of the steering group to raise funds for the Golden Jubilee anniversary for DofE in the year 2006. He worked as Chairman of the Joint funding board for the UK and International engagements.

Rabheru was also an active supporter of charities like Combat Stress, Debra and also worked with the Asian community.

== Personal life and death ==
Rabheru met Harshida Jivraj Rabheru at Kingston College and married her in 1980 in Kenya having triplets: Rishi, Shayan and Nikita, and lived in Buckinghamshire.

Rabheru died on 23 December 2022, at the age of 70.

== Honours and awards ==
Rabheru was appointed Commander of the Royal Victorian Order (CVO) in the 2011 New Year Honours and Knight Commander of the Royal Victorian Order (KCVO) in the 2022 Birthday Honours.

Rabheru was also appointed Deputy Lieutenant of Buckinghamshire in 2011.
