= Angiolina Foster =

Angiolina A Foster CBE is a Scottish civil servant who is the chief executive of NHS 24. She worked in Communities Scotland, rising to chief executive, then held Director positions in two of the directorates of Scottish Government: Strategy and Ministerial Support 2007–2011, Health and Social Care Integration 2011–2014. She returned to a chief executive position in special health boards following this.

== Career ==
She studied at the University of Glasgow, graduating in 1978 with a MA.

She worked in local government before taking up a civil service post with Communities Scotland in November 2001. Shortly after joining she spent several months seconded to the Glasgow Housing Association. She was acting chief executive at Communities Scotland since September 2003. In November 2007 she became Director of Strategy and Ministerial Support at Scottish Government. Then in 2011 she took up the post of Director of Health and Social Care Integration. In March 2014 she was appointed chief executive of Healthcare Improvement Scotland. In February 2016 she was appointed interim chief executive of NHS 24.

== Awards and honours ==
She was made a Commander of the Order of the British Empire (CBE) in the 2011 New Year Honours.
