= Mark Constantine =

Entrepreneur (b. 1952)

Mark Constantine OBE
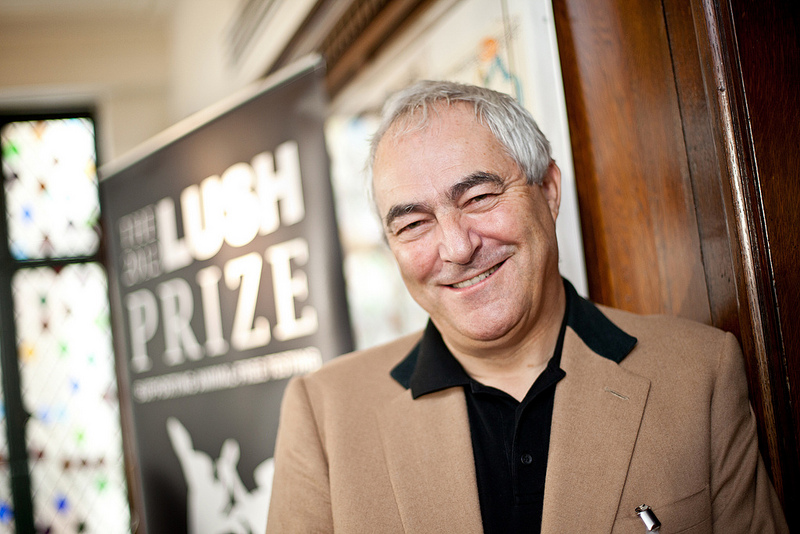
- Born: 21 July 1952 (age 74); Sutton, London
- Occupations: Entrepreneur and businessman
- Known for: Co-founder of Lush
- Spouse: Mo Constantine (m. 1973)
- Children: 3

Mark Constantine OBE (born 21 July 1952) is a British entrepreneur and businessman best known as the co-founder and CEO of Lush, described as "one of the world's biggest cosmetics firms."

== Personal life ==
Constantine was born on 21 July 1952 in Sutton. He failed his GCEs at Weymouth Grammar School and became homeless at the age of 16, sleeping in a tent in an area of woodland. Later on, he took an apprenticeship as a hairdresser, earning £3 per week.

In 2018 Constantine's childhood friend Jeff Osment wrote Dear John: The Road to Pelindaba (ISBN 9780992708269) about Constantine's quest to trace his absent father John. It was published by Lush to ensure that Amazon could not distribute it, as there had been conflict between Lush and Amazon.

Constantine married in 1973 and has a daughter and two sons.

== Career ==
=== Early beginnings and freelance work ===
Constantine worked in a cosmetics retailer in the 1970s after being made homeless where he was the victim of workplace sexual harassment. After several jobs in the London area, Constantine relocated back to Poole to work in the freelance cosmetics industry. During his freelance career, Constantine sent samples of his work, such as shampoo, to Dame Anita Roddick, founder of The Body Shop from whom he took some orders. However, due to intellectual property rights conflict with Roddick, Constantine sold the company to her in 1991 for a sum of £17 million.

=== Cosmetics To Go ===
After the sale, Constantine, along with his wife Margaret ("Mo"), reinvested the capital into Cosmetics To Go, a "direct mail startup." However, this venture ended quickly. Bankruptcy was filed in 1994, citing the products being priced too cheaply and Constantine underestimating business expenses.

=== Lush ===
Constantine and Mo founded Lush in Poole in 1995. By 2007 there were 462 Lush stores in 46 countries, with a combined revenue of $292 million. The company was described in 2018 as "one of the world's biggest cosmetics firms".

Constantine and Mo were both appointed Officer of the Order of the British Empire (OBE) in the 2011 New Year Honours, having been recognised for their "services to the beauty industry."

=== Political activity ===
Constantine has been a long-term supporter of the Green Party of England and Wales, donating to Siân Berry's campaign to become Mayor of London in 2008, and to the Green Party as a whole in the run-up to the 2017 general election.
