= Company Chemists' Association =

British trade association

- Abbreviation: CCA
- Formation: 1898; 128 years ago
- Type: Trade association
- Legal status: Association
- Purpose: Represent for large pharmacy operators in the United Kingdom
- Location: Kingston on Soar, United Kingdom
- Region served: United Kingdom
- Products: Advocating for the chemist industry
- Members: 8 representing 6,500 pharmacies (2025)
- Chief Executive: Malcolm Harrison
- Funding: Members fees
- Website: thecca.org.uk

The Company Chemists’ Association is a British trade association that represents large pharmacy operators in the United Kingdom. It was established in 1898. It aims to influence policy and support market development for its members, all large businesses.

Its members are: Asda, Boots UK, Lincolnshire Co-op, Morrisons, Pharmacy2U, Rowlands Pharmacy, Superdrug, Tesco, and Well Pharmacy. Together they own and operate around 4,000 pharmacies across England, Scotland and Wales.

== History ==
It had been involved in the joint project, Pharmacy Voice, with the National Pharmacy Association and the Association of Independent Multiple Pharmacies. The joint project was closed in April 2017 and all members went back to their individual associations.

Malcolm Harrison, a former senior manager at Boots UK, was appointed chief executive in March 2018.

In February 2022 the association produced a study showing that there was a shortage of 3,000 community pharmacists in England, largely because of the recruitment of pharmacists to primary care networks.

There were more than 20,000 instances of reported temporary pharmacy closures in England between October 2021 and September 2022. Most were from pharmacy branches owned by bigger companies. The association said this was because the demand for pharmacists in England was outstripping supply, although this explanation was contested.

== Services ==
It speaks for its members in relation to government proposals which impact on pharmacies.
