= Beatrix Ong =

British fashion designer (born 1976)

Beatrix Ong is a London-based British luxury fashion accessories designer, known for her shoes.

Called 'The New Choo', in 2004 Ong was named by The Independent newspaper as one of the Top Ten leading shoe designers.

Ong founded Beatrix Ong in 2002.

== Early life ==
Beatrix Ong was born in London, England. She attended King George V School in Hong Kong and later moved to Brighton, England.

== Career ==
=== 2002–2008 ===
Beatrix Ong began her career in fashion as an intern at Harper's Bazaar in New York. At age 22 she became Creative Director at Jimmy Choo Couture. She launched her own label in 2002.

=== 2008–2013 ===
Ong started her collaboration with Dover Street Market with shoes exclusively for London's leading style emporium.

In 2011, Ong was appointed Member of the Order of the British Empire (MBE) for services to the fashion industry.

=== 2013–2015 ===
In 2013, Ong joined the then Mayor of London, Boris Johnson, Chancellor of the Exchequer, George Osborne and UK Prime Minister, David Cameron on delegations to China to promote British creativity.
