= Alastair Watson (British Army officer) =

- Born: Alastair Alexander Linton Watson; 1953
- Military career
- Allegiance: United Kingdom
- Branch: British Army
- Rank: Major
- Unit: Black Watch

Major Alastair Alexander Linton Watson LVO (born February 1953) was Private Secretary to Prince Andrew, Duke of York from July 2003 to July 2012.

He was born in Wuppertal, West Germany, educated at Eagle House, Wellington College and at New College, Oxford, before he joined the Black Watch (the family regiment in which his father (Major General AL Watson CB, who was Colonel of the Black Watch and Lieutenant Governor of the Royal Hospital, Chelsea) and brother (Patrick Watson: MD of Montrose Public Affairs) have served, in 1976.

Service included: training at Mons OCS (1972) and RMA Sandhurst (1975): three operational tours in Ulster (1976; 1981 and 1989); an operational tour in Belize (1979); Adjutant at the Scottish Infantry Depot, Glencorse, Edinburgh (1979–81); Operations Officer of a mechanised infantry battalion in the British Army of the Rhine (1982–84); two-year course at RMCS Shrivenham and the Staff College, Camberley (awarded CGIA); SO2 in MO3 in the Ministry of Defence (1987–88); a tour in Berlin as a Company Commander with the Black Watch (just prior to the Berlin Wall coming down) (1989–90) and an operational requirements/tactical doctrine role at UK's Headquarters Land Forces in Wilton, Salisbury (1990–91).

On retiring from the British Army in early 1991, he spent 11 years with Fired Earth plc, including a seven-year stint as Sales Director, and was in the management team during the sale of the Plc to PPMV (1999) and on to Aga Foodservices plc (2001), before joining the Royal Household.

He was appointed Lieutenant of the Royal Victorian Order (LVO) in the 2011 New Year Honours.
