= Association of Independent Multiple Pharmacies =

Association Pharmacies

The Independent Pharmacies Association (IPA) formerly known as the Association of Independent Multiple Pharmacies is a British trade association. Its office is registered in Doncaster. The Association represents and supports pharmacies which are privately and independently owned, and it offers partnerships and honorary membership to suppliers and service providers.

== Membership ==
Membership of the IPA is open to independent community pharmacies with one or more branches.

IPA members represent a significant number of pharmacies in England and Wales delivery valuable healthcare services to their local communities.

The association also offers honorary memberships and partnerships to organisations and companies who wish to work with the community pharmacy sector.

Dr Leyla Hannbeck is the chief executive of the IPA. She pointed out that their members had delivered 16 million vaccinations by December 2021 and are identifying unvaccinated people, but said there was too much red tape.

== Criticism ==
In December 2021 the association protested that during the COVID-19 pandemic in the United Kingdom many pharmacies were “inundated by patients walking in because they were instructed by some GP surgeries to do so”. They complained about shortages of lateral flow tests. Hannbeck said that every five minutes, approximately, somebody goes into a pharmacy asking for a test but do not always get them as supply is "patchy".
