= Martin William Ashley =

British architect

Martin William Ashley MVO Dipl Arch RIBA (born 29 April 1952) is a British architect known for restoration of ecclesiastical buildings and royal properties and a specialist in period and listed buildings. He studied a Diploma in Architecture at Kingston Polytechnic and completed a scholarship with Society for the Protection of Ancient Buildings in 1976. He worked for Purcell Miller Tritton and became a partner before setting up his own business, Martin Ashley Architects, in 1994. From 1999 to present, Martin Ashley has held the post of Surveyor of the Fabric St Georges Chapel, Windsor. In 2011 Martin Ashley was honoured with Member of the Royal Victorian Order He is an architect member of Guildford Diocesan Advisory Committee, and lectures on the philosophy and principles of historic building conservation.

== Projects ==
- St George's Chapel, Windsor Castle
- Cowdray Ruins
- Buckingham Palace, Grand Entrance Portico Steps and Carriage Landings
- Buckingham Palace, Quadrangle East Elevation
- St James's Palace, The Queen's Chapel
- Dorchester Abbey

== Awards ==
- South East Region 'Building Conservation Award'
- Georgian Group Architectural Awards 2010: Restoration of a Georgian building in an urban setting
- RICS Awards 2010 Building Conservation Award (commended)
- Natural Stone Awards 2008, Repair & Restoration Award: St George's Chapel, Windsor Castle, Berkshire
