= Carolyn Downs =

British public executive (born 1980)

Carolyn Grace Downs CB (born 25 February 1960) is ex-chief executive of Brent Council, London. She is the principal policy advisor to the council and senior manager with responsibility for operational issues and overseeing the council's annual expenditure of around £1 billion.

== Biography ==
Downs has an MA in Library and Information Studies from UCL and began her career working in a council library. Her career has included top jobs in several local councils. From 2003 to 2009, Downs was the first female chief executive of Shropshire County Council. She had worked at the Council since 1999 and was previously a corporate director, which included having responsibility for Environmental Services. During her tenure, the Shropshire County Council became the highest performing county council in the UK.

She then worked as director general of corporate performance at the Ministry of Justice, a position which included being seconded to the Legal Services Commission in March 2010 to take over as chief executive after Carolyn Regan resigned. She was appointed chief executive of the Local Government Association in September 2011. She was awarded Companion of the Order of the Bath in the 2011 New Year's Honours list.

In 2015, she was appointed as chief executive of Brent Council. Under Downs' leadership, Brent became LGC's Council of the Year and London Borough of Culture in 2020. The programme included funds to support local people and organisations to produce cultural activities. Downs has spoken out on the need for housing reform, social care, and poverty issues.
