= Janet Vitmayer =

British museum director (born 1952)

Dame Janet Vitmayer DBE
- Born: Janet Mary Vitmayer; 2 September 1952 (age 74)
- Education: Keele University; City, University of London
- Occupation: Museum director
- Children: 2

Dame Janet Mary Vitmayer DBE (born 2 September 1952) is a British museum director.

== Early life ==
Vitmayer was born on 2 September 1952 to parents from Czechoslovakia, Erno (a.k.a. Arnost) and Maria (née Pichler) Vitmayer. She studied History and American Studies at Keele University.

== Career ==
In 1976, Vitmayer started work at the Imperial War Museum as a research assistant. In 1983, she became director of the Livesey Museum for Children, a role she held until 1993. During this period, she completed a Master's degree in Museum and gallery Management at City University. She became head of public services at Horniman Museum in 1993, holding this role until 1998, when she became chief executive for the same museum. She held the role of chief executive until March 2018. During her tenure, she led several fundraising campaigns and annual visitor numbers increased from 200,000 to more than 900,000.

She worked at Pitt Rivers Museum from 2000 to 2015. At this time she was chair of a Wellcome Trust awards committee in 2008–2009 and from 2011 to 2013. She was a trustee of the London Transport Museum from 2001 to 2013, a trustee of the Collections Trust from 2008 to 2015 and has been a trustee of the Hunterian Collection since 2013 and of the Florence Nightingale Museum since 2016. The Guardian noted that Vitmayer was one of few female museum directors at the time.

== Honours ==
Janet Vitmayer was made a Commander of the Order of the British Empire in 2011 for services to museums, before being elevated to Dame Commander of the same Order in 2018 for services to museums and diversity.
