= Maisie Ringham =

British musician

Maisie Ringham MBE
- Born: June 1924; Woolwich, London, England
- Died: 3 December 2016 (aged 92)
- Other name: Maisie Ringham-Wiggins
- Occupation: Musician
- Known for: First female principal trombonist in a British orchestra

Maisie Ringham MBE (June 1924 – 3 December 2016), later Maisie Ringham-Wiggins, was a British musician. She was the first woman to be a principal trombonist in a British orchestra.

== Early life ==
Ringham was born in Woolwich, London. Her parents were both musical, as were two uncles and several male cousins. Having taught herself the basics of how to play the euphonium at the age of 6 she began to study the trombone at the age of 10 with her father as her first teacher. A year later, she took part in a Divisional Young People's Festival in Ipswich, giving an impromptu performance of "Unfathomed Love". The solo was such a success that she was regularly appearing in Salvationist concerts and other events as "The Wonder Girl Trombonist".

Ringham began to take lessons with George Maxted, principal trombone of the London Philharmonic Orchestra at the Junior department of Trinity College of Music (now Trinity Laban Conservatoire of Music and Dance) however her studies with Maxted were disrupted due to her evacuation from London during World War II. In 1941 she was awarded the Candlin Wind Scholarship to study at the Royal Manchester College of Music (now the Royal Northern College of Music) where she studied until 1944. Whilst still a student Ringham featured as a soloist on several recordings and was the college's first trombonist to earn a performer's diploma.

She lived with relatives in Cardiff during World War II.

== Career ==
Ringham played in the BBC Midland Light Orchestra after college. She was invited to join the Hallé Orchestra in 1944 by John Barbirolli, and in that context became the first woman to be a principal trombonist in a British orchestra. She remained with the Hallé Orchestra until 1955. She made several recordings in 1946, and had several trombone compositions written for her, including works by Erik W. G. Leidzén and Ray Steadman-Allen.

Ringham taught trombone and continued performing with Salvation Army bands into her later years. For a time she was the denomination's only female bandmaster in the British Territory, and was bandmaster of the London Ladies Brass. She was made a Member of the British Empire in 2011, "for services to music", and accepted the honor "on behalf of all female trombonists, everywhere!" In 2016, she received the Sheila Tracy Award from the British Trombone Society.

Towards the end of her life she ran the Herga Swing Band in Northwood. She once told off a trumpeter for ‘flourishing’ during a performance of The Muppet Show theme tune. He replied that this was a swing band and improvisation was part of the ethos. Uniquely Maisie would conduct the big band like an orchestra and hit the table with her stick whilst doing so to keep the tempo.

== Personal life ==
Ringham married a fellow trombonist, Ray Wiggins, in 1950. They had two children. She died in December 2016, aged 92 years. Trombonist Dudley Bright recalled Ringham as "a remarkable lady trombonist in a man's world."
