= Imkaan =

Imkaan is a UK-based Black feminist organisation dedicated to addressing violence against Black and minoritised women and girls.

Imkaan was founded in 2004. From 2004 to 2013 its executive director was Marai Larasi. From 2019 to 2023 Imkaan's executive director was Baljit Banga.

Since 2023, Imkaan's Co Executive Directors have been Mary Clarke and Ghadah Alnasseri.In March 2025, Ghadah Alnasseri was appointed as the Executive Director of Imkaan.

In July 2024 Imkaan launched their manifesto "In Our Words", calling for the new government to end systemic inequality and violence against Black and minoritised women and girls https://www.imkaan.org.uk/

In March 2020 Imkaan launched a report, Reclaiming Voice, on sexual violence against minoritized women.
