= University Hospitals Association =

British association

Coordinates: 51.5258°N 0.1295°W

The University Hospital Association, formerly the Association of UK University Hospitals, is a leadership body for university hospitals in the UK established in 1998. Its main focus is in teaching and research. In April 2025 it formally became part of NHS Providers, who took over the former hosting arrangement with the Medical Schools Council.

== Membership ==
The association is a membership organisation made up of 41 UK university hospitals represented by their hospital chief executives. It also incorporates six sub-groups that meet to respond to developments and challenges facing university hospitals from the perspective of their specific role. They are:

- Directors of Finance
- Chief People Officers
- Chief Operating Officers
- Medical Directors
- Directors of Nursing
- Research & Development (R&D) Directors
