= Bambino Mio =

Brand of reusable nappies

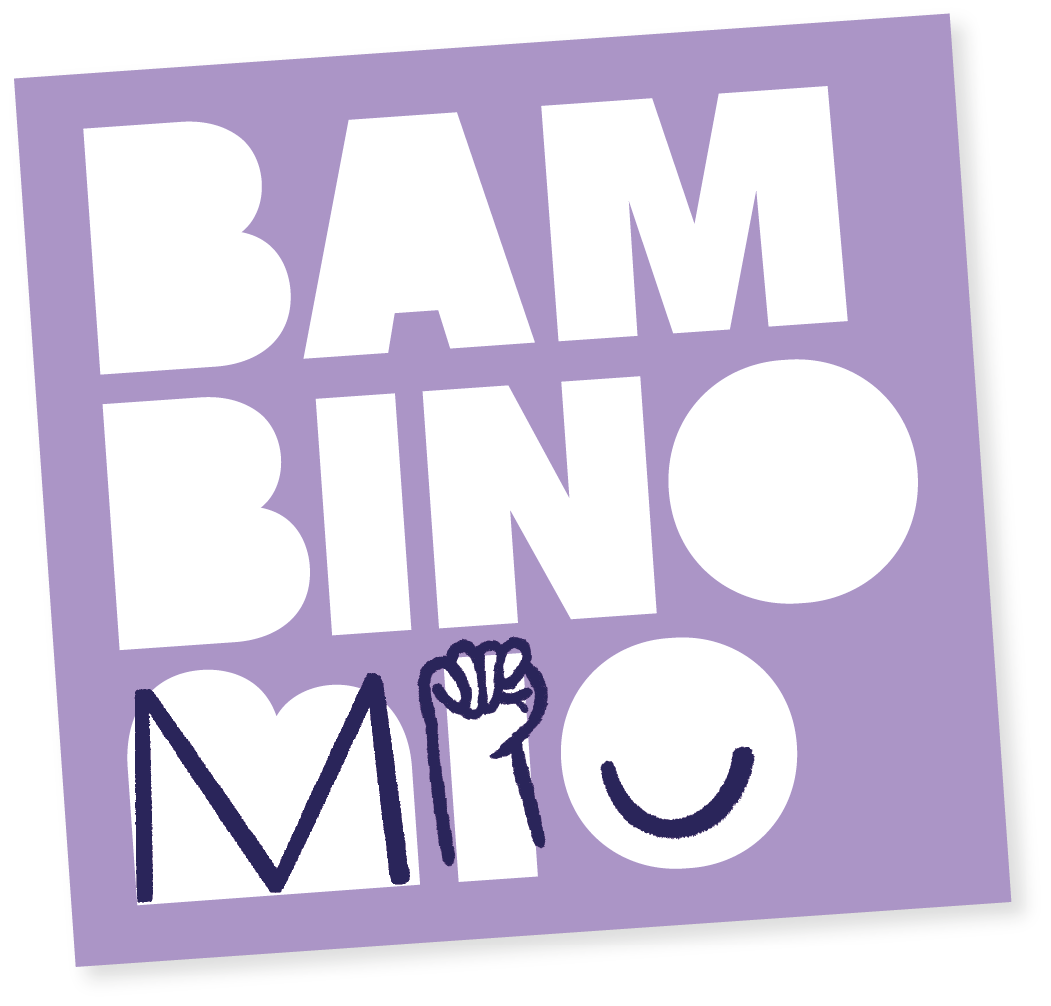
- Type: Public
- Industry: Infant clothing
- Founded: 1997
- Headquarters: Northamptonshire, UK
- Area served: Worldwide
- Key people: Guy Schanschieff (founder)
- Website: Bambino Mio

Bambino Mio is a brand of reusable nappies, manufactured and sold by a company of the same name based in Brixworth, Northamptonshire, UK. Bambino Mio nappies are widely used in the UK, and are sold in more than 70 countries. It was sold in 2024 to Demeter Project Limited owner of a subsidiary of the swim brand Splash About after a brief period of administration.

As well as nappies, the company sells related products such as nappy liners, reusable swim nappies, potty training pants, reusable baby wipes, and laundry detergent.

== History ==
Bambino Mio was founded in 1997 by husband and wife Guy and Jo Schanschieff, after noting similar businesses in New York and Australia. The couple set up a reusable nappy laundry service from their home in Northampton, UK, and started to sell reusable nappies (Cloth diapers) and associated products directly to parents through mail order under the name Bambino Mio.

In 2003, the company enrolled in the UK Passport to Export scheme, and by 2006 it had recruited several multilingual employees and set up a web site to manage international sales in 24 languages. In 2007, Bambino Mio were presented with two Northamptonshire Business Excellence awards.

The company ran into financial difficulty after a period of post-COVID market contraction and shifting consumer spending during the cost-of-living crisis. Despite securing a major investment in 2021, the brand could not sustain the corporate overhead and infrastructure costs it had built up. The business would later go into administration in November 2024, the swift sale process managed to save the jobs of 22 employees and prevented disruptions for suppliers and customers. Since its restructuring the core product line up was overhauled and the company now focuses on a smaller line of products with fewer options which have been met with community disapproval though the company has at least for now proven to be able to trade successfully, despite removing its two most iconic lines.

== Founders ==
Guy Schanschieff was awarded an MBE in the 2011 New Year Honours List for his services to business. In 2003 he founded the North Somerset Nappy Alliance, now called The Nappy Alliance, an association which represents manufacturers and distributors of reusable nappies when dealing with political affairs and local government. In 2014 Schanschieff was promoted to Chairman of The Nappy Alliance.Since its restructuring the company is run by and overseen by Lesley Beach, a local wife and mother.
