= Paul Davies (wheelchair rugby) =

British wheelchair rugby player

Paul Andrew Davies, MBE is a former British wheelchair rugby player and former manager of the Great Britain national wheelchair rugby team. He was the manager for the team at the Sydney 2000 Paralympic Games (6th place), and won two European Championships. He was a Manager of the Great Britain Wheelchair Rugby Development Team from 2002 to 2005. In 1998, he successfully put together the first of two World Class Performance Lottery Bid Documents securing over £125,000. The second Bid Document was put together in November 2000 again successfully securing £113,590 until December 2001. In July 2002 he was involved in the first ever-integrated rugby tour (World Friendship Tour) between the GB Wheelchair Rugby Development Unit and Haslemere RFC based in Surrey. Securing over £200,000 in sponsorship a group of 50 wheelchair and able-bodied rugby players went on a tour of USA, Singapore, Australia and South Africa

Davies was appointed Member of the Order of the British Empire (MBE) in the 2011 New Year Honours for services to wheelchair rugby.

He served in the Royal Welch Fusiliers from 1978 to 1986. During a rugby match for his regiment he broke his neck

He started playing wheelchair rugby in 1987 and helped develop the sport in the UK. He became manager of the GB national team, after playing international wheelchair rugby for many years .

I've always said wheelchair rugby is "chess with violence" – and that sums it up really.

— Paul Davies
