= Chris Lowe (biotechnologist) =

Christopher Robin Lowe
- Born: United Kingdom
- Scientific career
- Fields: Biomedical Engineering, Biosensors
- Workplaces: University of Cambridge

Christopher Robin Lowe (1945) is a British bioengineer who is Emeritus Professor of Biotechnology and Director of the Institute of Biotechnology at the University of Cambridge and a Fellow at Trinity College. He has carried out research in the area of biosensors, biopharmaceuticals, and enzyme, protein and microbial technology. His research has been recognized by over 20 major national and international awards.

== Research ==
His primary research interest is in healthcare biotechnology, particularly work that has significant commercial application.

== Awards and memberships ==
He is a Fellow of the Royal Academy of Engineering, of the Institute of Physics, and of the Russian Academy of Medical Sciences. He received the Pierce Award for Outstanding Contributions to the Field of Affinity Chromatography, 1989, the David Curnow Prize in Clinical Chemistry, 1991, the Schlumberger Stichting Prize, 1994 and the Queen's Award for Technological Achievement, 1996 He also receives the Silver Jubilee Medal of the Chromatographic Society, 2002, the Henry Dale Medal and Prize: The Royal Institution (London), 2003, the Royal Society of Chemistry Industrially-Sponsored Award in Sensors: Medal and Prize, 2005, and the Dade-Behring Award for Clinical Chemistry, 2006 He holds life membership in The Royal Institution (London), 2003 He was named "Most Entrepreneurial Scientist of the UK", UKSEC, 2006 and received the Queen's Anniversary Prize for Higher and Further Education: The Royal Anniversary Trust, 2007

== Sources & External Links ==
- University of Cambridge faculty profile
