= Joseph McNally (businessman) =

British businessman and philanthropist (1942–2012)

Joseph McNally, CVO (17 July 1942 – 1 March 2012) was a British businessman and philanthropist. He took Compaq from its start to becoming a $6 billion sales and manufacturing business in the UK, overtaking IBM to market leadership of the PC business.

Born and raised in Tyneside, Joe McNally worked in computer programming and as a salesman with ICL and Honeywell. In 1984, due to his background in computers and general management, McNally helped launch CompaqComputer Corporation (CCC) to the British market with only $40,000 in cash on hand, a secretary and a rented office. He served as vice-president, and UK and Ireland managing director until July 2000. He then served as Chairman for a further year. He lobbied successfully for CCC to locate its European manufacturing base at Erskine, Scotland and under McNally, the company at its height employed roughly 6,000 people.

Rod Canion, CCC's founding president, and its CEO through October 1991, said of McNally, that he had provided the leadership necessary to take Compaq UK from start-up to the No 1 spot in a very short time.

== Philanthropy ==
McNally was supported local sponsorships. He returned regularly to the area for shooting parties with a small group of long-standing friends. As a former Gateshead Grammar School boy he was also interested in opening up opportunities for youth employment. For more than two decades he was closely involved with the Duke of Edinburgh Award Scheme, of which he was a trustee. He was made a Commander of the Royal Victorian Order (CVO) in the 2011 New Year Honours.

== Personal life ==
Joseph and Anne (née Buglass) McNally married in 1968; the couple had two children. They resided at Burnham, Buckinghamshire.

== Death ==
McNally died in 2012, aged 69, following a battle with cancer, and was survived by his wife, children and two grandsons.
