= Graham Bell (advocate) =

Scottish advocate

Graham Clark Bell OBE KC is a Scottish advocate.

He has been instructed regularly in the Criminal Appeal Court since being called to the Bar. As both Junior and Senior Counsel he has conducted many important appeals. From 1998 to 2000 he was an Advocate Depute and represented The Crown in the Appeal Court. Since the year 2000 he had acted ad hoc for the Crown.

At the end of January 2004, he was appointed a board member of the Scottish Criminal Cases Review Commission (SCCRC). The SCCRC conducted a review of the conviction of Abdelbaset al-Megrahi in the Pan Am Flight 103 bombing trial, and in 2007 referred the case to the High Court of Justiciary.

Bell was appointed Officer of the Order of the British Empire (OBE) in the 2011 New Year Honours for services to the legal profession in Scotland.
