= Andrew Goudie (economist) =

Scottish economist (born 1955)

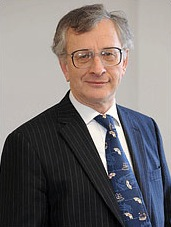

Andrew William Goudie CB (born 3 March 1955) is a visiting professor at the University of Strathclyde.

Educated at Queens' College, Cambridge, he joined the Scottish Office in 1990.

He was appointed Companion of the Order of the Bath (CB) in the 2011 New Year Honours.

He published the book Scotland's Future: The Economics of Constitutional Change.

== Positions ==
- Research Fellow, Queens' College, Cambridge (1981–83)
- Director of Cambridge Econometrics
- Economist at the World Bank
- Principal Economist at the Organisation for Economic Co-operation and Development (1995)
- Chief Economist for the Overseas Development Administration/Department for International Development (1996)
- Director General Economy and Chief Economic Adviser to the Scottish Government (1999)
- Visiting Professor at The University of Strathclyde (2011)
