= Birley (surname) =

Birley is a common English surname, and may refer to any of the following people:

- Andrew Birley (born 1974), British archaeologist, son of Robin Birley (archaeologist) and Patricia Birley
- Anthony Birley (1937–2020), Professor of Ancient History at University of Manchester (1974–90), son of Eric Birley
- Barbara Birley (born 1976), archaeologist and museum curator
- Caroline Birley (1851–1907), English geologist, niece of Hugh Birley
- Dawn Birley (born 1977), Canadian taekwondo practitioner and actress
- Derek Birley (1926–2002), English educator and writer
- Eric Birley (1906–1995), British historian and archaeologist, great-grandson of Hugh Hornby Birley
- Francis Birley (1850–1910), England international footballer who won the FA Cup three times, nephew of Hugh Birley
- Hugh Birley (1817–1883), Conservative Party Member of Parliament for Manchester from 1868 to 1883, nephew of Hugh Hornby Birley
- Hugh Hornby Birley (1778–1845), leading Manchester Tory who is reputed to have led the fatal charge of troops at the Peterloo Massacre
- India Jane Birley (born 1961), British artist and businessperson, daughter of Mark Birley
- Mark Birley (1930–2007), British entrepreneur and founder of Annabel's nightclub, son of Oswald Birley
- Mathew Birley (born 1986), English professional footballer
- Oswald Birley (1880–1952), British portrait painter, great-grandson of Hugh Hornby Birley
- Patricia Birley (born 1948), British archaeologist, wife of Robin Birley (archaeologist)
- Patrick Birley (born 1965), chief executive of European Climate Exchange, son of Robin Birley (archaeologist)
- Robert Birley (1903–1982), English educationalist who was headmaster of Charterhouse School and Eton College, and an anti-Apartheid campaigner
- Robin Birley (businessman) (born 1958), English businessman and political activist, son of Mark Birley
- Robin Birley (archaeologist) (1935–2018), British archaeologist, son of Eric Birley
