= Margaret Birley =

British archeologist (1910–2000)

Margaret "Peggy" Isobel Birley, née Goodlet (29 April 1910 - 2000) was an archaeologist who worked at the Roman forts of Housesteads and Vindolanda.

== Biography ==
Margaret, known as Peggy, Isobel Goodlet was born in 1910 in Forest Hall, Northumberland. As a student at Armstrong College in Newcastle in the 1930s, she studied with archaeologist Eric Birley and volunteered at the archaeological excavations Birley was leading of the Roman forts of Housesteads and Vindolanda (on and near Hadrian's Wall). In 1934 she and Eric Birley married; four years later the couple co-authored a report on the Vindolanda excavations together.

The Birleys had two sons, Robin and Anthony, both of whom also became archaeologists; Robin and his wife Patricia continued the excavations at Vindolanda, followed by their son and daughter-in-law Andrew and Barbara Birley.

== Publications ==
- Birley, Eric, and Margaret Birley. 1938. Fourth report on excavations at Chesterholm-Vindolanda: An Original Article From The Archaeologia Aeliana: Or Miscellaneous Tracts Relating To Antiquity. Northumberland Press. doi:10.5284/1060002
- Corder, Philip 1937. A pair of fourth-century Romano-British pottery kilns near Crambeck. With a note on the distribution of Crambeck Ware by Margaret Birley. The Antiquaries Journal. Vol 17, pp. 392–413.
