= Roy W. Davies =

British classicist

- Born: Roy William Davies; 1942; Liverpool, England
- Died: 1977 (aged 35)

Academic background
- Education: Durham University
- Thesis: Peace-time routine in the Roman Army (1967)
- Doctoral advisor: Eric Birley

Academic work
- Discipline: Classics
- Sub-discipline: Roman army, ancient warfare
- Institutions: Durham University; University of Leeds; Sunderland College of Education
- Notable works: Service in the Roman Army (1989)

Roy William Davies (1942–1977) was a British classicist and historian of ancient warfare whose main research interest was the Roman army.

His magnum opus, Service in the Roman Army (1989), based on papers edited and compiled by David Breeze and Valerie Maxfield, was published posthumously.

== Early life and education ==
Davies was born in Liverpool and attended the Liverpool Institute High School for Boys. He graduated from Durham University in 1963 with a first in classics and stayed on for a PhD. His thesis, Peace-time routine in the Roman Army, was supervised by Eric Birley and completed in 1967.

== Career and research ==
Davies lectured for a period of time at both Durham and the University of Leeds. He was appointed to a lectureship at the Sunderland College of Education, where he worked until his premature death at the age of 35.

Davies published 58 research papers on the Roman Army between 1968 and 1977. A particular feature of his research was his integration of "unofficial records" like soldiers' letters to give a "human face" to Roman military organisation. He was also known for his extensive use of papyrus evidence from Egypt and the Near East.

His most impactful paper is arguably "The Roman Military Diet", where he used literary and archaeological evidence to "demolish" the then widely held view that the Roman army did not consume meat dishes and ate only corn. Writing tablets discovered at Vindolanda between 1973 and 1975, which contained food lists suggesting a varied diet, offered further proof in favour of Davies.

Service in the Roman Army (1989) is a compilation of ten of the most significant articles published by Davies, along with a large number of supporting illustrations. The final book, which Anthony Birley compared to Soldier and Civilian in the Later Roman Empire (1963) by Ramsay Macmullen, is generally "accessible" to non-academic readers and features a sizeable bibliography.
