= Robin Birley =

Robin Birley may refer to:

- Robin Birley (archaeologist) (1935–2018), English archaeologist
- Robin Birley (businessman) (born 1958), English businessman and political activist
