= Eric Birley =

British historian and archaeologist (1906–1995)

- Birley's Hatfield College portrait
- Born: Eric Barff Birley; 12 January 1906; Eccles, Lancashire, United Kingdom of Great Britain and Ireland
- Died: 20 October 1995 (aged 89); Carvoran House, Greenhead, Northumberland, United Kingdom
- Citizenship: United Kingdom
- Education: Clifton College; Brasenose College, Oxford
- Known for: Excavations of Vindolanda; Studies into the organisation and methods of the Roman Army
- Scientific career
- Fields: History; Archaeology
- Institutions: Hatfield College; University of Durham
- Doctoral students: John Spaul; Michael Jarrett; Roy W. Davies
- Other notable students: David Breeze; Brian Dobson

Eric Barff Birley MBE, FBA, FSA, FSA Scot (12 January 1906 – 20 October 1995) was a British historian and archaeologist, particularly associated with the excavation of the forts near Hadrian's Wall, notably at Vindolanda.

== Early life and education ==
Eric Birley was born in Eccles, Lancashire, on 12 January 1906.

He was educated at Clifton College. He then studied classics at Brasenose College, Oxford, where he obtained a double first in Mods and Greats. He was influenced in the study of history and archaeology by Michael Holroyd, his Brasenose tutor; R. G. Collingwood, the renowned authority on Roman Britain; and Frank Gerald Simpson, Director of Field Studies at Durham, and a great influence on Birley vis-à-vis the art and science of excavation.

== Career ==
Under the direction of F. G. Simpson, Birley began excavating at Hadrian's Wall in 1927 while an undergraduate. Birley's first archaeological dig occurred at Birdoswald. After graduating from Oxford, Birley worked for a short time for the Society of Antiquaries of London acting as a construction site observer for the Society. It was during this period in London that Birley befriended Mortimer Wheeler of the London Museum engendering in Birley a lifelong interest in "imported Roman 'Samian' pottery with moulded decoration." A chance discovery in 1929 of two inscription stones in the praetentura at Birdoswald led Birley to suggest redating the Wall periods. This discovery, and Birley's redating, impacted the study of Roman Britain tremendously inasmuch as it "has formed the basis of all subsequent work on the chronology of Hadrian's Wall."

In 1929, having developed a keen interest in the Wall through his excavations, Birley succeeded in buying the Clayton Estate at Chesterholm that had belonged to Anthony Hedley, the 19th-century antiquary. Nearby Houselands would also come up for sale; however, Birley could not afford the purchase of both properties, although he would eventually excavate them both. Chesterholm-Vindolanda would eventually be converted into a museum and research centre, in which the spectacular finds from Vindolanda would be displayed and interpreted.

"An offering being made to Fortune at the start of Durham University Excavation Committee's 1929 season at Birdoswald Roman fort. The foreground group includes Eric Birley (with pipe) and Frank Gerald Simpson (centre, in plus fours)."

In 1931, at the age of 24, he became a lecturer at the University of Durham, "already with an impressive record of excavation on Hadrian's Wall, partly under the guidance of F.G. Simpson," whom he would replace upon the latter's stepping down as Director of Field Studies. Through trips to Germany and Switzerland, he began to expand his expertise in samian pottery, epigraphy, and his primary field of interest, the Roman army. As a consequence of these trips abroad, his continental reputation grew.

In 1943, he was promoted to reader. In 1947, he became Vice Master of Hatfield College. In 1949, he was promoted to Master of Hatfield. He would finish his academic career having been Master of Hatfield College (1949–1956); Professor of Romano-British History and Archaeology (1956–1971); Head of the Department of Archaeology (1956–1971); and Dean of the Faculty of Social Sciences (1968–1971).

In 1949, Birley established the first International Congress of Roman Frontier Studies. During his tenure, he was president of all three of the local archaeological societies. Also, during his years at Durham, he would influence such notable students as George Jobey and John Gillam, each of whom would go on to hold prestigious university teaching positions. One student recalls that Birley was "incredibly generous and trusting in … [his] … support to students."

Birley would become known as an expert on the Roman army. For his "practical experience of the ways in which modern armies work," he was inspired in asking questions about organisation and methods of the Roman army. His expertise and work in this field served to make Birley the founder of the "Durham School" of archaeology having attracted

several highly-talented and influential postgraduate students to the Department, whose research has … "epitomised, and to a large degree set the agenda for, British work on the Roman military for much of the twentieth century." Often known collectively as the "Durham School," they include David Breeze (Chief Inspector of Ancient Monuments for Historic Scotland and Visiting Professor at Durham University since 1994), Brian Dobson (Emeritus Reader at Durham University), Michael Jarrett (former Professor at Cardiff University), Valerie Maxfield (Professor at Exeter University) and John Wilkes (Emeritus Professor at the London Institute of Archaeology).

== World War II service ==
During the Second World War, Birley worked in military intelligence. He was appointed to the Territorial Army Reserve of Officers Special List (a list of officers not formally attached to a unit) as a second lieutenant on 25 August 1939, just prior to the outbreak of war. In the New Years Honours of 1943 Birley, by then promoted to the rank of captain and temporary major, became a member of the military division of the Order of the British Empire (MBE).

On 24 May 1945, Birley, by now promoted to temporary lieutenant-colonel, received permission from the war office to accept the award of the Polish order of Polonia Restituta fourth class (officer's cross). On 16 January 1948, he received permission to accept the American award of the Legion of Merit third class (officer). On 8 September 1953 Birley, whose permanent commission during the war had only been that of a lieutenant and who held the war substantive rank of major, was granted the permanent rank of major backdated to 1 January 1949.

Major Birley reached the age limit (50 years) for service on 12 January 1956 and retired from the army on that date, being granted the honorary rank of lieutenant-colonel.

== Personal life ==
In 1934, Birley married Margaret "Peggy" Isabel Goodlet, a former student of his who excavated at Housesteads and Vindolanda and with whom he published a report on the Vindolanda excavations. The marriage that would last over 60 years until his death. Their two sons, Robin (1935–2018) and Anthony (1937–2020), would both become eminent in their field, and would continue their father's work at Vindolanda, along with fellow-archaeologist Patricia Birley (wife of Robin). The elder, Robin, was named after Birley's great influence, R. G. Collingwood, while the younger, Anthony, was named after Anthony Hedley, the former owner of Chesterholm. While excavations at Chesterholm-Vindolanda are still carried out by members of the Birley family (Eric's grandson and granddaughter-in-law Andrew and Barbara Birley), the Birley family no longer reside there having left Chesterholm for Durham in 1950.

Eric Birley died at Carvoran House, Greenhead, Northumberland, on 20 October 1995, at the age of 89.

== Legacy ==
In Birley's obituary in The Independent, John Wilkes, former Durham PhD student and Emeritus Yates Professor of Greek and Roman Archaeology at the Institute of Archaeology, wrote that "Eric Birley dominated the study of the Roman army, of Hadrian's Wall and Roman frontiers in general for much of his 40 years as a teacher at Durham University, interrupted only by six years of war service, when he was engaged in the study of the German army for Military Intelligence."

Birley's influence is still felt in the Archaeology Department at Durham University: "Durham Archaeology is still founded on the vision and determination of its early pioneers, notably Eric Birley and Rosemary Cramp, and their influence lives on in successive generations of staff and students."

== Birley family ==
Eric was the great-great-nephew of Hugh Hornby Birley, who led the troops at the Peterloo Massacre in 1819.

== Selected publications ==
- Birley, Eric (1952). Housesteads Roman Fort Northumberland. London: Her Majesty's Stationery Office.
- —— (1953). Roman Britain and The Roman army collected papers. Kendal: Titus Wilson & Son Ltd.
- —— (1954). Corbridge Roman Station Official Guidebook. London: Her Majesty's Stationery Office (HMSO).
- —— (1960). Chesters Roman Fort Northumberland. London: Her Majesty's Stationery Office.
- —— (1961). Research on Hadrian's Wall. Kendal: Titus Wilson & Son Ltd.
- Birley, Eric & Devijver, Hubert (1988). The Equestrian Officers of the Roman Imperial Army, Vol. 1. Amsterdam: J. C. Gieben

== See also ==
- Official Vindolanda Site
- Robin Birley (son)
- Patricia Birley
- Anthony Birley (son)
- Andrew Birley (grandson)
- Barbara Birley
- Brian Dobson
- David Breeze

Academic offices
Preceded by Angus Macfarlane-Grieve	Master of Hatfield College, Durham; 1949–1956	Succeeded by Thomas Whitworth
