= Andrew Birley =

British archaeologist

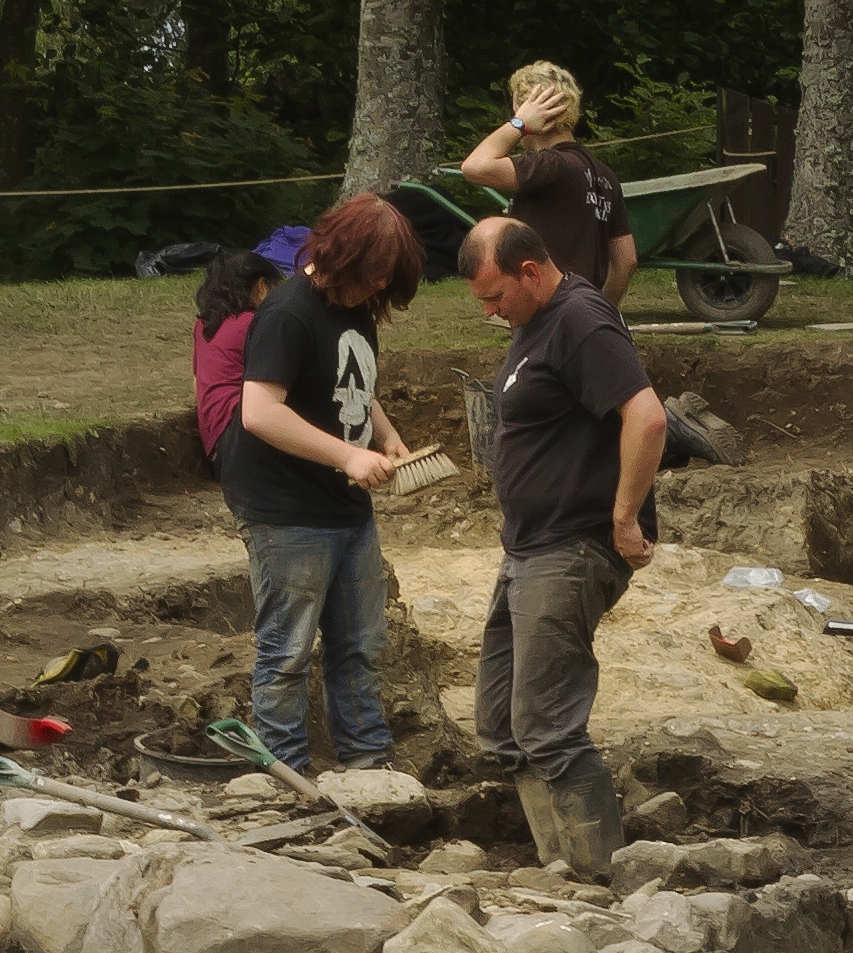
- Birley (right, front) during excavations at Vindolanda, 2012
- Born: Andrew Robin Birley; 1974 (age 51–52)
- Occupation: Archaeologist
- Known for: Excavating Vindolanda
- Spouse: Barbara Birley
- Children: Geoffrey Birley and Sophia Birley
- Parent(s): Robin and Patricia Birley
- Relatives: Eric Birley; Margaret Birley

Academic background
- Education: University of Leicester
- Thesis: The nature and significance of extramural settlement at Vindolanda and other selected sites on the Northern Frontier of Roman Britain (2010)
- Academic advisors: Penelope Allison; Simon James

Andrew Robin Birley (born 28 October 1974) is a British archaeologist and the Director of Excavations on the site of Vindolanda.

== Biography ==
He is the son of Robin Birley and Patricia Birley and grandson of Eric Birley, who founded the department of Archaeology at Durham University, and of Margaret "Peggy" Birley, and is married to Barbara Birley, also an archaeologist and the Curator of the Vindolanda Trust. He graduated from the University of Leicester in the summer of 1996 and has been working on the site for 18 years, ten of which have been in full-time employment by the Vindolanda Trust.

He began his PhD in 2004 and completed it in 2010. His doctoral thesis was titled "The nature and significance of extramural settlement at Vindolanda and other selected sites on the Northern Frontier of Roman Britain". Birley has appeared in a number of television programmes about Roman Britain and archaeology for the BBC, the History Channel, National Geographic and the Discovery Channel.

Published works include relevant contributions to the Vindolanda Excavation Reports from 1997 to 2009, the 'Eyeopener' series, 'Following the Eagle', as well as a fascicule on Roman locks and keys from the site of Vindolanda.

== Publications ==
- Birley, A. 1997. Vindolanda Research Reports. New Series. Volume IV. The Small Finds Fasicule II. Security: The Keys and Locks. Greenhead: Roman Army Museum
- Birley, Andrew R. 2001. Vindolanda's Military Bath Houses. Greenhead: Roman Army Museum
- Birley A. and Blake, J. 2005. Vindolanda Excavations 2003-2004: Vindolanda Research Report Greenhead: Roman Army Museum
- Birley A. and Blake, J. 2007. Vindolanda Excavations 2005-2006: Vindolanda Research Report Greenhead: Roman Army Museum
- Birley A. 2013. 'The fort Wall: A great divide?' In Breaking Down Boundaries, Hadrian's Wall in the 21st Century. Collins and Symonds eds, JRA supplementary Series 93. Portsmouth, Rhode Island. 85-103
- Birley A. 2016. 'The complexity of intramural and extramural relationships on the northern frontier of Roman Britain – a Vindolanda case study' In Small Finds & Ancient Social Practices in the Northwest Provinces of the Roman Empire. Hoss & Whitmore eds. Oxbow Books. Oxford. 146-173
- Birley A & Alberti M. 2021. Vindolanda Excavation Research Report: Focusing on Post-Roman Vindolanda. Chesterholm Museum publications. Bardon Mill.

== See also ==
- Eric Birley
- Robin Birley
- Patricia Birley
- Barbara Birley
- Anthony Birley
- Vindolanda
