= John Pearson Gillam =

British archaeologist

John Pearson Gillam FSA
- Born: 10 July 1917
- Died: 31 December 1986 (aged 69)
- Occupation: Archaeologist

Academic background
- Education: Durham University

Academic work
- Discipline: Archaeology
- Sub-discipline: Roman archaeology
- Institutions: Newcastle University

John Pearson Gillam (10 July 1917 – 31 December 1986) was a British archaeologist who specialised in the study of Roman coarse pottery.

== Early life and education ==
John Pearson Gillam was born in Chesterfield and educated at Chesterfield Grammar School. He entered Durham University, and graduated with a Bachelor of Arts in History in 1938, and a postgraduate diploma in Theology in 1939. He was an undergraduate at St Chad's College.

=== Second World War ===
Gillam joined the Royal Army Medical Corps in 1940 and was later commissioned into the 14th Punjab Regiment in 1942. He served in India, North Africa and Europe and ended his war service with the rank of Major.

== Career and research ==
Gillam returned to Durham University in 1946 to take up a research studentship at Hatfield College under Eric Birley. He was appointed as a lecturer in Roman-British archaeology at Durham in 1948. In 1956 he became Reader in Roman-British history and archaeology at King's College in Newcastle, which would split from Durham to become Newcastle University in 1963. He held the position of Reader until his retirement in 1982.

In 1947 John Gillam took part in the first post-War excavation at Corbridge, along with Sir lan Richmond and Eric Birley. Gillam continued to co-direct the Corbridge training excavations until the last season in 1973. He also directed the training excavation at Great Casterton.

Gillam specialised in the study of coarse Roman pottery. His Types of Roman Coarse Pottery Vessels in Northern Britain, first published in Archaeologia Aeliana in 1957, became the standard work on the subject. It was subsequently revised and issued in book form in three editions. Gillam was working on a fourth edition at the time of his death.

== Honours and awards ==
He became Fellow of the Society of Antiquaries of Scotland in 1958. He was also a Fellow of the Society of Antiquaries of London.

A festschrift by colleagues was published in 1979 as “Roman pottery studies in Britain and beyond: papers presented to John Gillam”.

The Society for the Promotion of Roman Studies dedicated volume 16 of Britannia to him in 1985. This volume included a bibliography of his publications.

The Study Group for Roman Pottery established the annual John Gillam Prize in 2004 to “to honour a key founder of our Group for his tremendous contribution to the subject”.

== Personal life ==
Gillam married Marie Watson, a fellow student from Durham, in 1942. A polyglot, he could speak and read Hindi, Urdu, Italian and German.
