= Michael Jarrett (archaeologist) =

British archaeologist and gay rights activist

Michael Jarrett FSA
- Born: Michael Grierson Jarrett; 8 January 1934
- Died: 14 November 1994 (aged 60)
- Awards: Fellow of the Society of Antiquaries of London

Academic background
- Education: Durham University
- Thesis: A Study of the municipal aristocracies of the Roman Empire in the west, with special reference to North Africa (1958)

Academic work
- Discipline: Roman Archaeology
- Institutions: Cardiff University

Michael Grierson Jarrett (8 January 1934 – 14 November 1994), also commonly known as Mike Jarrett, was a British archaeologist and gay rights activist. Specialising in the archaeology of Roman Britain, he spent much of his academic career at Cardiff University, where he was awarded a personal chair in 1980.

Outside academia, Jarrett was a prominent member of the Campaign for Homosexual Equality.

== Early life and education ==
From Lancashire, Jarrett was educated at Manchester Grammar School and Durham University, where he graduated with a degree in history. Influenced by Eric Birley, he was drawn to the study of Hadrian's Wall. His PhD was awarded in 1958. After completing his doctorate, Jarrett conducted archaeological excavations at Halton Chesters and Maryport.

== Career ==
Jarrett joined the newly founded Department of Archaeology at University College, Cardiff in 1960 as a lecturer in Roman-British History and Archaeology. Surprisingly, given his background as a 'Wall' archaeologist, he chose to stay in Cardiff long term and embarked on a series of ambitious excavations of the Roman forts of Wales. In 1969, he published the second edition of The Roman Frontier in Wales, substantially revising and expanding the original work by Victor Erle Nash-Williams. During the 1970s he split his fieldwork between the deserted medieval village of West Whelpington, near Kirkwhelpington in Northumberland, and the site of the Roman villa at Whitton, South Glamorgan. He was promoted to Professor in 1980.

Jarrett was known for his unconventional teaching style. He once delivered a lecture lying on his back on a desk blowing smoke rings, and on a different occasion walked through one door while making a point and returned through another still discussing it. Ill health brought an end to his fieldwork in the 1980s, although he continued to publish research.

Before his death he had become interested in the early architectural history of Durham Cathedral, and his study of its building phases appeared posthumously in The Antiquaries Journal.

== Personal life ==
Jarrett was active in the Campaign for Homosexual Equality. In 1976, he criticised comments about homosexuality made by the Archbishop of Wales, Gwilym Williams, writing in a church magazine that gay clergy were "not rare".

He died from liver failure on 14 November 1994, and was survived by his partner Shaun. His obituary in The Times simply noted that he was unmarried.

== Selected publications ==
=== Books ===
- Nash-Williams, V. E.; Jarrett, Michael G. (1969). The Roman Frontier in Wales (2nd ed.). Cardiff: University of Wales Press.
- Jarrett, Michael Grierson (1976). Maryport, Cumbria: A Roman Fort and Its Garrison. Cumberland & Westmorland Antiquarian and Archaeological Society.
- ———; Wrathmell, Stuart (1981). Whitton: An Iron Age and Roman Farmstead in South Glamorgan. Cardiff: University of Wales Press. ISBN 9780708307656.

=== Journal articles ===
- Jarrett, Michael G. (1962). "The Career of L. Titinius Clodianus". Latomus. 21 (4): 853–859. JSTOR 41524734.
- ——— (1963). "The African Contribution to the Imperial Equestrian Service". Historia: Zeitschrift für Alte Geschichte. 12 (2): 209–226. JSTOR 4434789.
- ——— (1971). "Decurions and Priests". The American Journal of Philology. 92 (4): 513–538. JSTOR 292662.
- ——— (1976). "An Unnecessary War". Britannia. 7: 145–151. JSTOR 525770.
- ———; Wrathmell, Stuart (1977). "Sixteenth- and Seventeenth-Century Farmsteads: West Whelpington, Northumberland". The Agricultural History Review. 25 (2): 108–119. JSTOR 40273890.
- ——— (1978). "The Case of the Redundant Official". Britannia. 9: 289–292. JSTOR 525943.
- ——— (1994). "Non-Legionary Troops in Roman Britain: Part One, the Units". Britannia. 25: 35–77. JSTOR 526988.
