= Service in the Roman Army =

Nonfiction book by Roy W Davies

- 2010 book jacket
- Author: Roy W. Davies
- Subject: Roman army history
- Set in: Ancient Rome
- Published: 1989
- Publisher: Columbia University Press
- Publication place: United States
- Media type: Print, eBook
- Pages: 336
- ISBN: 9780231069922
- OCLC: 18833409
- Dewey Decimal: 355.00937
- LC Class: U35 .D38 1989

Service in the Roman Army is a nonfiction history book by Roy W. Davies detailing aspects of life in the Roman army as well as the army's impact on Roman society. It was edited and compiled by David Breeze and Valerie A. Maxfield. The book was published in 1989 by Columbia University Press.

== Synopsis ==
In this book the author Roy Davies inquires into the Roman army's structure, training, and daily life. The book, published after his death in 1977, is a collection of ten of his papers. Some of Davies's work, such as his papers on joining the army, a soldier's daily routine, diet, and the medical service, are detailed research. And his work on Roman cavalry and military camps may be updated by future archaeological discoveries.

His other topics, like the investigation of crimes in Roman Egypt, show his early research into legal matters. His work shows the difference between a centurion's official legal power and the unofficial authority they had for resolving conflicts. Davies's also analyzes Hadrian's influence on the Roman army's training and discipline, and Davies mentions critics' negative remarks on the matter. And there was the ongoing debate among Senators at the time about the different policies of the emperors Trajan and Hadrian.

== Reception ==
Brian Campbell, reviewing this book for the academic journal, The Journal of Roman Studies, says that "[t]he editors have skilfully chosen and presented papers that both demonstrate very well the author's abilities as an ancient historian, and will also stimulate further research. For these papers to be readily accessible to scholars and students is the best tribute that Davies could have.

M. P. Speidel, writing for the academic journal Classical World says that "for all in all the editors have put together a truly exciting volume among the small number of books on the Roman army. It will please the intelligent general reader as well the scholar in the field"
