= Gallia (goddess) =

Romano-Gallic goddess

Gallia was a Romano-Gallic goddess, possibly related to the region of Europe known to the Romans as Gallia (Gaul). The only evidence of her name to date is an altar set up at Vindolanda by its auxiliary garrison of the 4th cohort of Gauls, stationed there from the early 3rd century onwards. Its inscription reads:

CIVES GALLI

DE GALLIAE
CONCORDES

QUE BRITANNI

Of which a free translation would be "The troops from Gaul dedicate this statue to the goddess Gallia with the full support of the British born troops".
