= Patricia Birley =

British archaeologist

Patricia Selina Birley (née Burnham) MBE FSA DL (born 27 June 1948) is an archaeologist and was the director of the Vindolanda Trust from 2002 to 2015.

== Biography ==
Birley founded the Vindolanda Trust in the 1970s as a curator and conservator. She became its Deputy Director in 1980 and Director from 2002 to 2015.

Birley was elected as a Fellow of the Society of Antiquaries of London on 5 May 2012. Since 2010 she has served as a Deputy Lieutenant for Northumberland. She was awarded an MBE in the 2011 New Year Honours for "services to Roman Heritage in Northumberland".

=== Family ===
Patricia was married to Robin Birley and is the mother of Andrew Birley and mother-in-law of Barbara Birley.
