= Robin Birley (archaeologist) =

British archaeologist (1935–2018)

- Born: 19 January 1935
- Died: 29 August 2018 (aged 83)
- Occupation: Archaeologist
- Known for: Excavating the Roman fort at Vindolanda; Discovery of the Vindolanda tablets

Robin Edgar Birley OBE (19 January 1935 – 29 August 2018) was a British archaeologist. He was the Director of Excavations at the Roman site of Vindolanda and head of the Vindolanda research committee. He was the son of Eric Birley and Margaret "Peggy" Birley (archaeologists of Hadrian's Wall) and brother of Anthony Birley. His wife Patricia Birley, son Andrew Birley, and daughter-in-law Barbara Birley are also published authors on Roman Vindolanda.

== Education and career ==
Both Birley brothers lived at the site with their father Eric Birley, with Robin starting his first excavation at age 14. He was educated at Clifton College, before spending some years with the Royal Marines before returning to work at Vindolanda and becoming the Director of the Vindolanda Trust. Birley excavated extensively at the site of Vindolanda and was intimately involved in the discovery of the Vindolanda tablets in 1973 and their subsequent interpretation and publication. These are a series of wooden tablets containing handwritten script, which continue to be discovered at the site. For a time this was the oldest known handwritten script in Britain, although the Bloomberg tablets discovered in the 21st century are older. The Vindolanda tablets have been translated from the Latin and have been published in print and online (as texts and images).

He published extensively on the Vindolanda site and appeared in several TV documentaries, including the 2003 BBC production of Our Top Ten Treasures.

== Publications ==
- Hadrian's Wall: Guide to the Central Sector (1972)
- Civilians on the Roman Frontier (1973)
- Housesteads (Vircovicium) Roman Fort and Civilian Settlement (1973)
- Discoveries at Vindolanda (1973)
- Vindolanda: A Roman Frontier Post on Hadrian's Wall (1979)
- Garrison Life on the Roman Frontier, Greenhead: Roman Army Museum (1991)
- The Building of Hadrian's Wall (1991)
- 'Four New Writing-Tablets from Vindolanda' in Zeitschrift für Papyrologie und Epigraphik pp. 431–446 by R and A Birley (1994)
- The Foot at the Rock: On Hadrian's Wall (1994)
- The early wooden forts: the excavations of 1973-76 and 1985-89, with some additional details... (1994)
- The making of modern Vindolanda with the life and work of Anthony Hedley, 1777–1835 (1995)
- Roman Records from Vindolanda on Rome's Northern Frontier, Greenhead: Roman Army Museum (1999)
- Chesterholm: From a Clergyman's Cottage to Vindolanda Museum (2000)
- Civilians on Rome's Northern Frontier: Families, Friends and Foes (2000)
- Vindolanda - Extraordinary Records of Daily Life on the Northern Frontier, Greenhead: Roman Army Museum (2005)
- Vindolanda: A Roman Frontier Fort on Hadrian's Wall (2012)
