= Dawn Birley =

Canadian taekwondo practitioner and actress

Dawn Jani Birley
- Born: Dawn Jani Birley; 30 November 1977 (age 48); Regina, Saskatchewan, Canada
- Occupations: Actress, Television anchor, educator, taekwondo practitioner
- Website: www.dawnjanibirley.com

Dawn Jani Birley (born 30 November 1977) is a Canadian Deaf actress, television anchor, educator and a popular taekwondo practitioner. She was engaged in her sport, taekwondo in the early parts of her life before becoming a professional actor in the mid-2000s. She graduated at Gallaudet University.

Birley is a host and anchor for the H3 Network Media Alliance, a Canadian medium which broadcasts in International Sign across all parts of the world. She is best known for her efforts in revealing the Deaflympic scandal about the cancellation of the 2011 Winter Deaflympics in Slovakia.

She is a fluent speaker of nine languages including five sign languages: American Sign Language, Finnish Sign Language, Swedish Sign Language, Norwegian Sign Language and International Sign.

== Biography ==
Birley was born on 30 November 1977 to Deaf parents in an all-Deaf family in Regina, Saskatchewan. She started to play volleyball, basketball and softball during her childhood before becoming a taekwondo practitioner. Birley has also played volleyball, basketball and softball for the Gallaudet University.

She also served as a teacher in countries including Norway and Finland after her college career.

== Sports career ==
Birley practiced the Korean martial art taekwondo at the age of 12. She became the world junior taekwondo champion in 1992, becoming the first Canadian female athlete to achieve the feat. She represented Canada at several international taekwondo competitions including Pan American Games from 1989 to 1999. Birley was also the part of the Canadian National Taekwondo Olympic team prior to the 1996 Summer Olympics after earning a spot in the Canadian National Olympic Team for 1996 but she was not able to compete in the event due to the removal of taekwondo from that Olympic Games.

In 1996, she was awarded the Deaf Sportswoman of the Year award by the ICSD.

She is also working as a coordinator in the development of Deaf sports in several countries.

== Acting career ==
Birley currently works as an actor with various theatre companies across the world. She spent 15 years in Finland where she was afforded more acting opportunities including a role in the world's first sign-language opera. She was also honoured as the 2015 Riksteatern's Artist of the Year from the National Swedish Touring Theatre, a prestigious acting award in Sweden for her performance in the leading role of When Winter Stars Shine Here. She also became the first Deaf person to achieve this honour.

She was awarded the Toronto Theatre Critics Award for Best Actress in a Play for her role as Horatio in Prince Hamlet.

== 1s1 Theatre ==
In 2019, Dawn founded the Canadian Deaf-led theatre company 1s1 Theatre with a mission to create theatre at the intersections of the Deaf and hearing worlds, always through a Deaf-led perspective. With the goal of bringing balance in how to tell a story and whose stories are told, 1s1 was founded to create theatre for Deaf and hearing audiences alike, bridging the gap between the two communities and cultures.

1s1 productions include:
i am puff
Lady M
QALB
To A Flame
