= Penelope Allison =

New Zealand archaeologist (born 1954)

Penelope Allison FSA FAHA SFHEA
- Born: Penelope Mary Allison; 1954; North Canterbury

Academic background
- Education: University of Canterbury (BA); University of Sydney (MA, PhD)

Academic work
- Discipline: Archaeology
- Sub-discipline: Roman archaeology, historical archaeology, classical art, gender in archaeology
- Institutions: University of Leicester

Penelope Mary "Pim" Allison (born 1954) is a New Zealand academic archaeologist specialising in the Roman Empire. Since 2015, she has been professor of archaeology at the University of Leicester. She is also a Fellow of the Society of Antiquaries and an Honorary Fellow of the Australian Academy of the Humanities.

== Life ==
Allison is originally from North Canterbury, New Zealand. She grew up on a sheep farm.

== Career ==
Allison received an undergraduate degree in pure mathematics from the University of Canterbury, and her MA Honours and her doctorate in archaeology from the University of Sydney. She was a scholar at the British School in Rome, and has taught archaeology and ancient history at the University of Sydney, the Australian National University and the University of Sheffield. She has held several research fellowships, including a fellowship in the Classics faculty at the University of Cambridge and fellowships at the University of Sydney. She joined the School of Archaeology and Ancient History at the University of Leicester as a lecturer in 2006.

She specialises in Roman and historical archaeology and has particular interests in household archaeology, and gender and space. Many of her publications relate to houses and households in Pompeii, and gender and space in Roman military forts in Germany. She is also interested in digital archaeology and how archaeological data can be spread digitally.

== Honors and awards ==
Allison is a senior fellow of the Higher Education Academy, a fellow of the Society of Antiquaries of London, an honorary fellow of the Australian Academy of the Humanities and a corresponding member of the Archaeological Institute of America.

== Research ==
Allison's research focuses on household archaeology as well as gender and space. Her current interests have expanded to encompass households and their activities in the colonial outback in Australia and foodways material culture in the Roman and colonial worlds. She is also interested in digital archaeology and the digital dissemination of archaeological data.

== Publications ==
=== Books ===
- Who came to Tea at the Old Kinchega Homestead?: Tablewares, Teawares and Social Interaction at an Australian Outback Pastoral Homestead (Leicester: BAR Publishing, 2020)
- Big Data on the Roman Table: New approaches to tablewares in the Roman world, co-editor, (Internet Archeology, 2018)
- People and Space in Roman Military Bases (Cambridge University Press, 2013)
- The Insula of the Menander in Pompeii III: The finds, a contextual study (Oxford: Clarendon Press, 2006)
- Pompeian households: analysis of the material culture, Monograph 42 (Los Angeles: Cotsen Institute of Archaeology, UCLA, 2004)
- together with F Sear: The Casa della Caccia Antica (Häuser in Pompeji 11). Munich: Hirmer (2002).

=== Edited books ===
- (co-editor) Big Data on the Roman Table, New approaches to tablewares in the Roman world, Internet Archaeology vol. 50 (2018)
- Dealing with legacy data, themed volume of Internet Archaeology 24-25 (2008)
- The Archaeology of Household Activities (Routledge: London and New York, 1999)

=== Other publications ===
- Roman household organization, in S. Crawford, D. M. Hadley and G. Shepherd, eds. The Oxford Handbook of the Archaeology of Childhood, 165–178. Oxford: Oxford University Press (2018)
- Meals and the Roman military, in T. Ivleva, J. de Bruin, M. Driessen (eds), Embracing the Provinces: Society and Material Culture of the Roman Frontier Regions. Essays in honour of Dr. Carol van Driel Murray. Oxford: Oxbow Books (2018)
- "Naming tablewares: using the artefactual evidence to investigate eating and drinking practices across the Roman world", in E. Minchin and H. Jackson (eds) Festschrift for Graeme Clarke, SIMA - Studies in Mediterranean Archaeology, 186–198. Uppsala: Astrom editions (2017)
- "Everyday foodways and social connections in Pompeian houses", in L. Steel and K. Zinn, eds, Exploring the materiality of food "stuffs": Transformations, symbolic consumption and embodiments, 152–186. London and New York: Routledge (Taylor and Francis, 2016).
- "Characterising Roman artefacts for investigating gendered practices in contexts without sexed bodies", American Journal of Archaeology 119.1 (2015)
- "Artefacts and people on the Roman frontier", in D. J. Breeze, R.H. Jones, and I. A. Oltean, eds, Understanding Roman frontiers: A celebration for Professor Bill Hanson, 121–134. Edinburgh: John MacDonald (2015).
- "Conversations and material memories: insights into outback domestic life at the Old Kinchega Homestead", Historical Archaeology 48.1 (2014): 87–104.
- "Soldiers' families in the early Roman Empire", in B. Rawson, ed., Families in the Greek and Roman worlds: a companion, 161–182. Oxford: Wiley-Blackwell (2011)
- "Understanding Pompeian household practices through their material culture", FACTA: A Journal of Roman material culture studies 3 (2009): 11–32
- "Measuring Women's Influence on Roman Military Life: using GIS on published excavation reports from the German Frontier", Internet Archaeology 24 (2008) doi:10.11141/ia.24.5
- "Mapping for gender: interpreting artefact distribution in Roman military forts in Germany", Archaeological Dialogues 13.1 (2006): 1–48
- "Pompeian households", on-line companion to Monograph 42, Cotsen Institute of Archaeology, UCLA (The Stoa: A Consortium for Electronic Publication in the Humanities).
- "Artefact distribution and spatial function in Pompeian houses", in B. Rawson and P. Weaver, eds, The Roman family in Italy: status, sentiment and space, 321-354 (Clarendon Press, Oxford, 1997)
- "Roman households: an archaeological perspective", in H. Parkins, ed., Roman urbanism: beyond the consumer city, 112-146 (Routledge, London and New York, 1997)
- "Why do excavation reports have finds' catalogues?", in C. G. Cumberpatch and P.W. Blinkhorn, eds, Not so much a pot, more a way of life, 77- 84 (Oxbow Books, Oxford, 1997)
- "On-going seismic activity and its effect on living conditions in Pompeii in the last decades", in T. Fröhlich and L. Jacobelli, eds, Archäologie und Seismologie: La regione vesuviana dal 62 al 79 d.C.: problemi archeologici e sismologici (Deutsches Archäologisches Institut Rom, Soprintendenza Archeologica di Pompei, Osservatorio Vesuviano), 183-190 (Biering and Brinkman, Munich, 1995)
