= Vindolanda =

Roman fort in Northern England

- Bardon Mill, Northumberland, U.K.
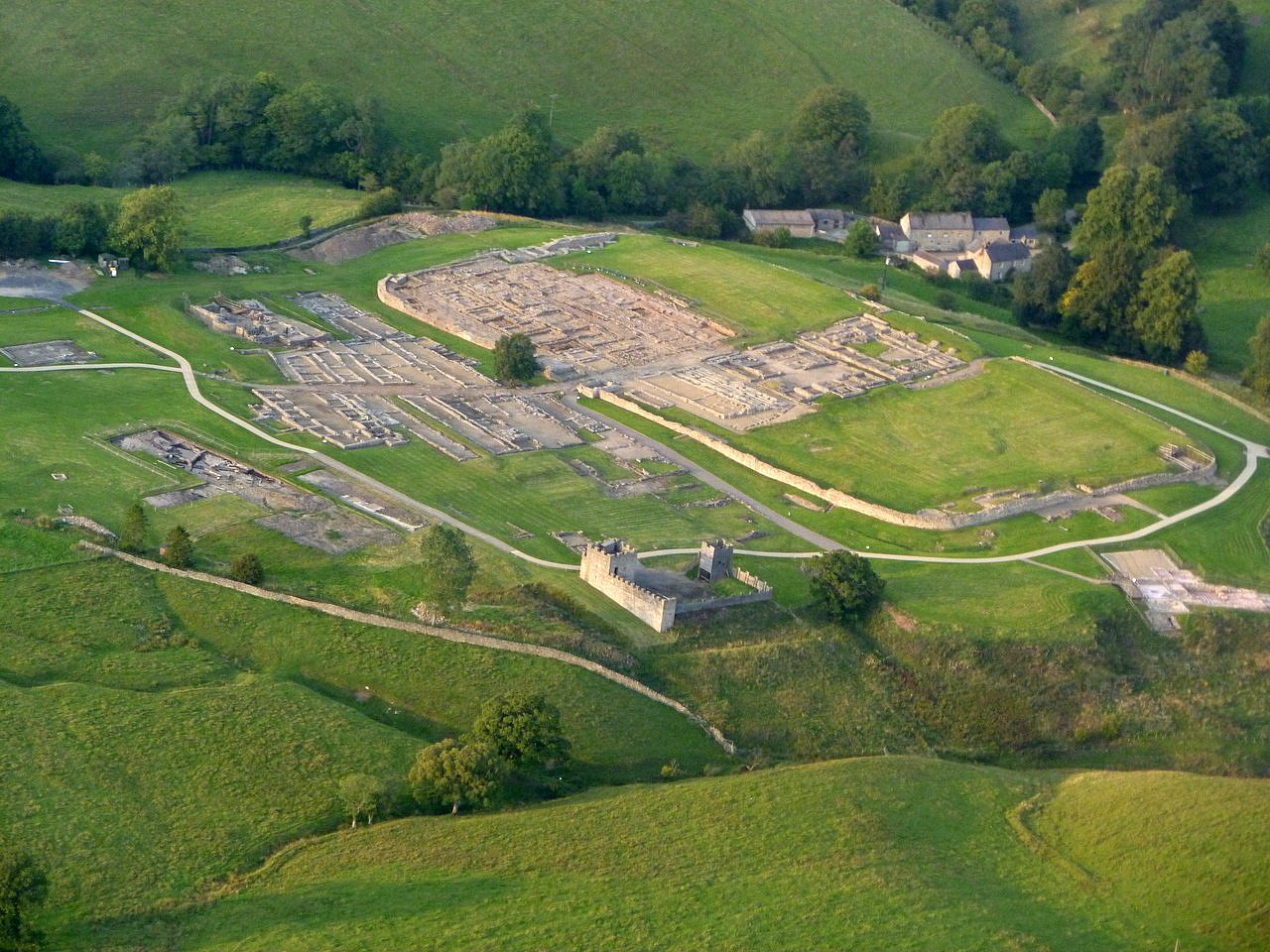
- Vindolanda from the air

Site information
- Type: Roman fort
- Controlled by: Vindolanda Trust
- Open to the public: Yes
- Condition: Derelict
- Website: https://www.vindolanda.com/

Location
- Shown within Northumberland
- Location within Northumberland
- Coordinates: 54.9911°N 2.3608°W
- Grid reference: grid reference NY7766

Vindolanda was a Roman auxiliary fort (castrum) just south of Hadrian's Wall in northern England, which it pre-dated. Archaeological excavations of the site show it was under Roman occupation from roughly 85 AD to 370 AD. Located near the modern village of Bardon Mill in Northumberland, it guarded the Stanegate, the Roman road from the River Tyne to the Solway Firth. It is noted for the Vindolanda tablets, a set of wooden leaf-tablets that were, at the time of their discovery, the oldest surviving handwritten documents in Britain.

== History and garrison ==
The site is a hill on the Stanegate road, with steep slopes on the north, east, and south sides. It originally had a deep dip running north-south through the centre of the hill, which was gradually filled up by successive layers of occupation. There is currently no evidence for settlement on the fortress site before the Roman period, but there was an iron-age hillfort at Barcombe Hill, 3/4 mile (1.3 km) to the northeast (which served as a quarry and signal station in the Roman period). Two pre-Roman farmsteads have been found in the area and two standing stones called the Mare and Foal, about 3 miles (5 km) to the west, are the remnants of a stone circle, which might have been the local religious centre. The name "Vindolanda" is probably Celtic, meaning "white lawn" or similar. (Note: Common Brittonic: windo-, lit. 'fair, white, blessed', landa, 'enclosure/meadow/prairie/grassy plain' (Old Gaelic: fiondland, Modern Gaelic: fionnlann).) An inscribed altar records a group called the Textoverdi, who may have been the native inhabitants of the area.

=== Late first century AD (Periods I–III) ===
Archaeological excavations, inscriptions, and the tablets indicate that Vindolanda was under Roman occupation from roughly 85 AD to 370 AD. The garrison consisted of a series of different infantry and cavalry auxilia units, not components of Roman legions. The first unit to be based at the site was the Cohors I Tungrorum (First Cohort of Tungrians), composed of Tungri from Gallia Belgica, led by Julius Verecundus, who seem to have arrived after Gnaeus Julius Agricola's conquest of the north and built the First Timber Fort (Period I). Vindolanda Tablet 154, a troop roster, records that the unit contained 746 men and 6 centurions, of which 295 men and 1 centurion were then at Vindolanda itself, while 335 men and 2 centurions were away at Coria (Corbridge), and 116 men and 3 centurions were away on other missions. Of the troops at Vindolanda, 15 were sick, 6 were wounded, and 10 were out of action with conjunctivitis. Around 92 AD, they rebuilt the site as the Second Timber Fort (Period II).

In the 90s AD, the Cohors I Tungrorum were replaced by the Cohors IX Batavorum (ninth Cohort of Batavians), a combined infantry and cavalry cohort of 1,000 men, composed of Batavi from the Rhine delta in Germania Inferior (modern-day Netherlands). They had the privilege of being commanded by one of their own noblemen, first Flavius Genialis and later Flavius Cerialis. Shortly after their arrival, they rebuilt the site again as the Third Timber Fort (Period III). The majority of the tablets found at Vindolanda belonged to Cerealis' archives. These include the correspondence of his wife Sulpicia Lepidina and his children's school exercises. In 104 AD, the cohort was ordered to abandon the fort in order to join Trajan's second invasion of Dacia. The fort was demolished, valuables were removed, and rubbish was burnt on bonfires. The tablets were among the items thrown on the bonfire, but a chance rain storm seems to have saved them from destruction.

=== Second century AD (Periods IV–VIb) ===
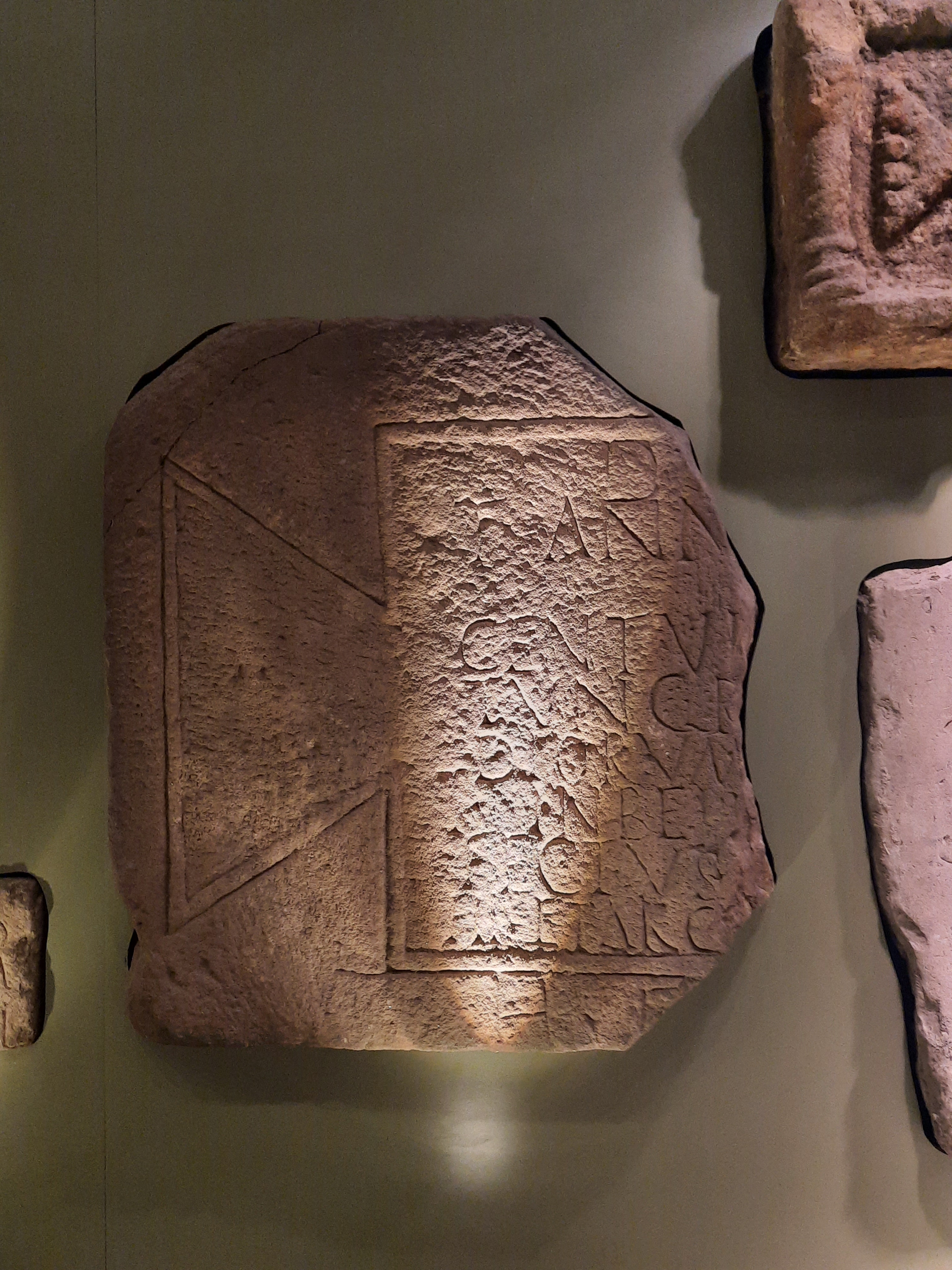
Tombstone for Titus Annius, centurion of Cohors I Tungrorum

The Cohors I Tungrorum returned to Vindolanda in or after 105 and built the Fourth Timber Fort (Period IV). They were joined by a contingent of Varduli cavalry, a Basque-speaking group from northern Spain. A large tombstone for Titus Annius, a centurion of Cohors I Tungrorum, which records that he was "killed in the war", probably indicates that the cohort was involved in heavy fighting that broke out in northern Britain in 117 AD. This seems to have led to the cohort's reduction from 800 to 500 men. This fighting prompted the construction of Hadrian's Wall slightly to the north and the fort probably served as an administrative hub during the construction of Hadrian's Wall. Vindolanda Tablet 344 and a very large wooden building may indicate that Hadrian resided at the fort for a period, as he oversaw the initial stages of construction in 122 AD. In the 120s, the cohort rebuilt the fortress again as the Fifth Timber Fort (Period V). The original plan for Hadrian's Wall was for it to consist of a turf wall with a series of milecastles and watchtowers along its length, but the main garrison remaining at Vindolanda and the other existing fortresses along the Stanegate road, so the construction of the Fifth Fort may have been in preparation for it to serve in this role. Later, it was decided to build new fortresses on the wall itself. Around 128 AD, the Cohors I Tungrorum abandoned Vindolanda and moved into the nearest of these new fortresses, Vercovicium (Housesteads Roman Fort, about two miles (three kilometres) to the north-east of Vindolanda).

In 142, Antoninus Pius moved the frontier north from Hadrian's Wall to the new Antonine Wall, but around 162 this was abandoned and the troops returned to Hadrian's Wall. It is unclear what happened to Vindolanda in this period. There are signs of a new timber fortress of late Hadrianic or early Antonine date. By 162, Vindolanda was occupied by the Cohors II Nerviorum (Second Cohort of Nervians), an infantry force composed of Nervii, a Belgic tribe from Gallia Belgica, who converted the timber fort into Stone Fort I (Period VIa).

In the early third century AD, there was an increase of attacks on the Romans in northern Britain and Emperor Septimius Severus decided to resolve the matter by personally leading an invasion of Caledonia (modern-day Scotland) in 208 AD. As part of these campaigns, a short-lived stone fortress, the Severan complex (Period VIb), was built at Vindolanda. The identity of the garrison in this period is uncertain. The Severan complex incorporated up to two hundred circular structures, which may have housed irregular auxiliary troops, native British civilians employed at the nearby quarries, hostages taken by Severus during the campaign, or pro-Roman British civilians seeking shelter from the disorder produced by the invasion. A skull found in the south ditch of the fortress was probably displayed before the fortress as a war trophy. Septimius Severus died at York in 211 AD; his sons Caracalla and Geta paid off the rebels and left for Rome.

=== Third and fourth centuries AD (Periods VII–IX) ===
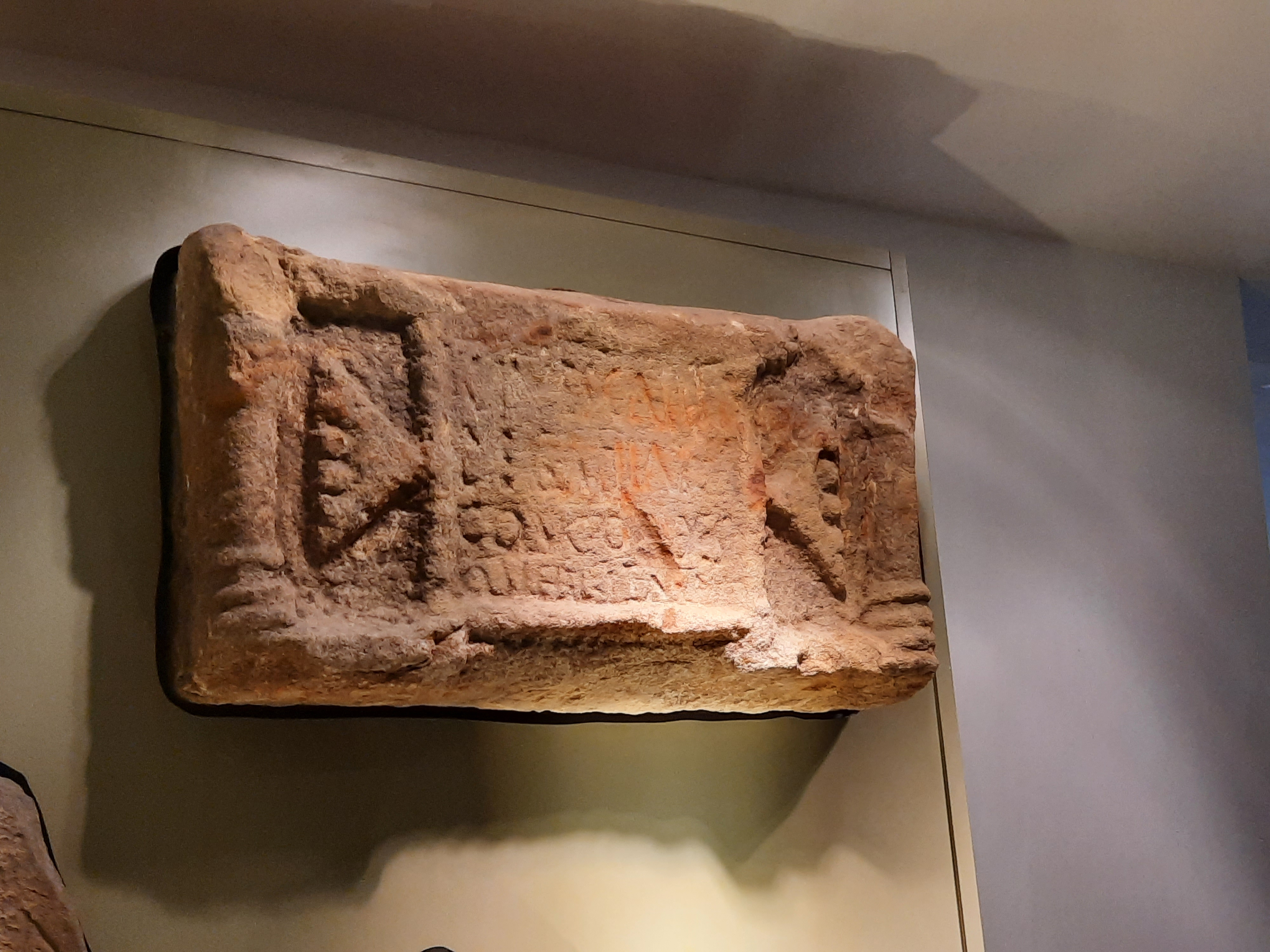
Dedicatory inscription to the goddess Gallia by Gauls and Britons

Sometime in the 210s, the Severan complex was demolished and replaced with Stone Fort II (Period VII) and a vicus (civilian settlement) was built to the west of the fortress. The majority of the structures that are visible today belong to this period or later. The occupants of the site at this time were the Cohors IV Gallorum equitata (Fourth cavalry Cohort of Gauls). A dedication to Caracalla shows that they were settled at Vindolanda by 213 AD. It had been presumed that the title of the cohort was, by this time, purely nominal, with auxiliary troops being recruited locally but an inscription found in 2005 suggests that native Gauls were still to be found in the regiment and that they liked to distinguish themselves from British soldiers. The inscription reads:

CIVES GALLI
DE GALLIAE
CONCORDES-
QUE BRITANNI

Translation:

The troops from Gaul dedicate this statue
to the goddess Gallia
with the full support of
the British-born troops

— Selkirk 2006, pp. 4–5

Another inscription records that the cohort rebuilt the western gate of the fortress in 223 AD. The cohort was commanded by Quintus Petronius Urbicus under Severus Alexander (222–235 AD). Marcus Caecilius Celer, Pituanius Secundus, and Gaius Sulpicius Pudens are also recorded as commanders, but their tenures cannot be dated. The final evidence for the cohort at Vindolanda is a fragmentary inscription recording renovations or construction under the emperor Probus (276–282 AD). Religious dedications survive from this period for a range of gods. Seventeen inscribed dedications have been found for Roman deities: seven for Jupiter, two for the genius (protective spirit) of the fortress headquarters, three for Mercury, one for the Fortune of the Roman People, one for Vulcan, one for Silvanus, one for Mars Victor, and one for Hercules. There are also statues of Diana, Hercules, and Priapus. Twenty dedications are attested for deities of northwestern Europe: twelve dedications to the Veteres ('old ones'), five for mother goddesses, and individual dedications for Cocidius, Mogons, and Maponus. There are also statues of the mothers and of Maponus. One dedication was erected for the goddess of Hama in Syria (a detachment from that city was based at Carvoran to the west).

Around the end of the third century, the fortress was briefly abandoned and then reconstructed (Period VIII). This may have been the result of reforms to the border defences of the Roman Empire by Diocletian. Over the fourth century, the size of the garrison declined and the vicus was abandoned. The fortress was once again rebuilt in the second half of the fourth century (Period IX), perhaps following Count Theodosius' defeat of the Great Conspiracy in 368. This rebuild was accompanied by the construction of an apsed building, possibly a church.

The last Roman troops left Britain in 407 AD, but occupation at Vindolanda continued for an uncertain amount of time. A small church was built inside the courtyard of the old headquarters sometime after 400 AD. A Christian dedication dating to around 600 AD has been found at and near the site, which may indicate that there was a monastic establishment at Vindolanda in this period. A tombstone for one Brigomaglos, whose name suggests Welsh origins, was found near Vindolanda and also dates to around 600 AD. He might have been a priest or a garrison commander for one of the kings of the Old North. Some Anglo-Saxon brooches have been found on the site.

== Description ==
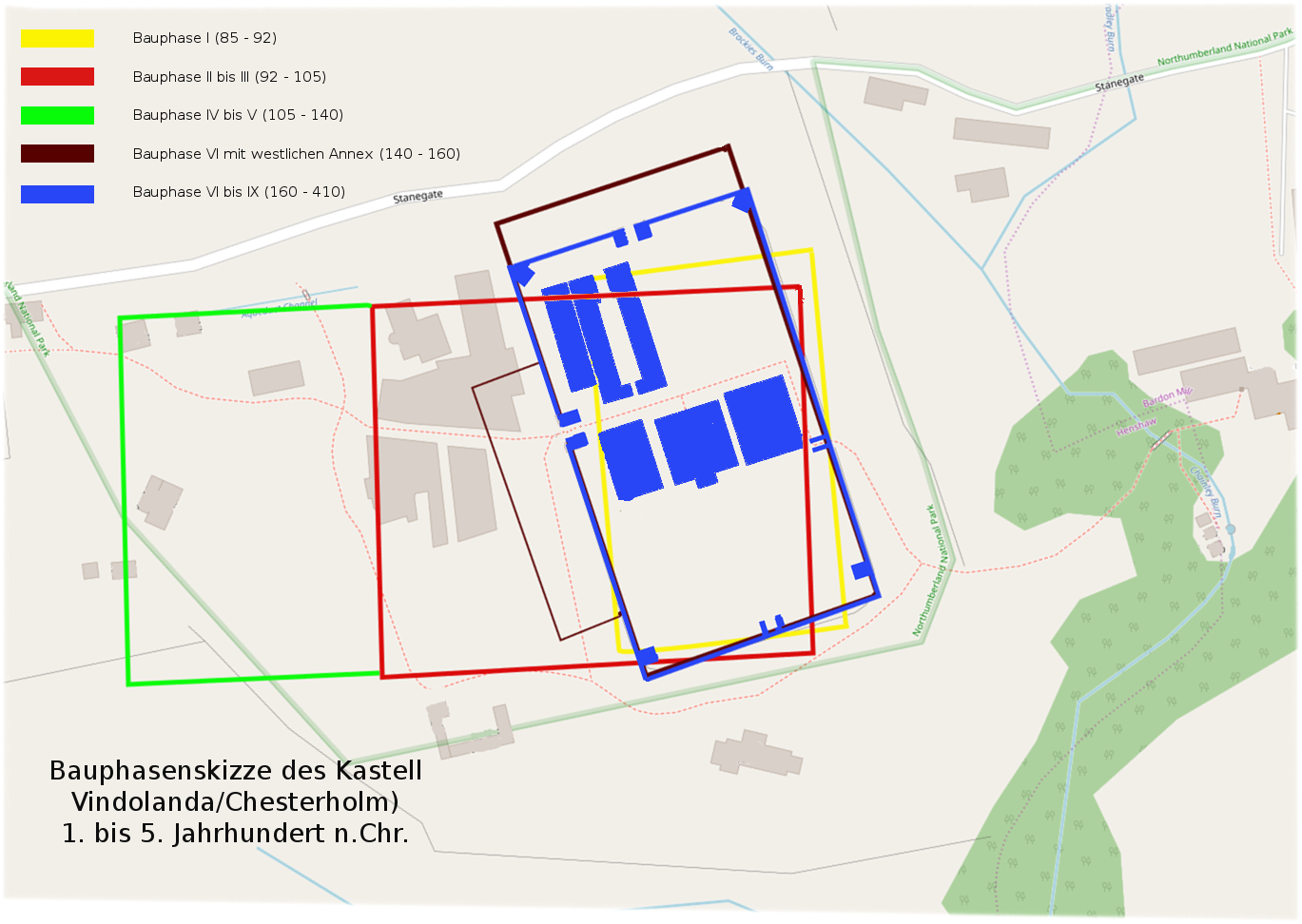
The different periods of the fortress' history. Yellow = Period I (85–92 AD); Red = Periods II and III (92–105 AD); Green = Period IV and V (105–140 AD); Brown = Period VI (140–160 AD); Blue = Period VI–IX (160–410 AD)

The site consists of a series of fortresses built one on top of the other, which have been divided by archaeologists into nine periods. The first five periods are successive forts built of wood and turf with different footprints (Periods I–V). They are buried as much as 13 feet (4 m) deep in the anoxic waterlogged soil and are covered by the remains of later periods, which makes excavation difficult, but has also led to the preservation of large amounts of organic matter. The fifth fort was converted to stone in period VIa, replaced with a new stone fort (the Severan complex) in Period VIb, and replaced with a second stone fort (Periods VII-IX), which accounts for most of the remains visible on the site today. Outside the fortress itself, a large bathhouse was built to the south in Period II, a smaller bathhouse and two temples were built to the west in Period VIa, and a vicus (self-governing village) existed to the west of the fort in Period VII.

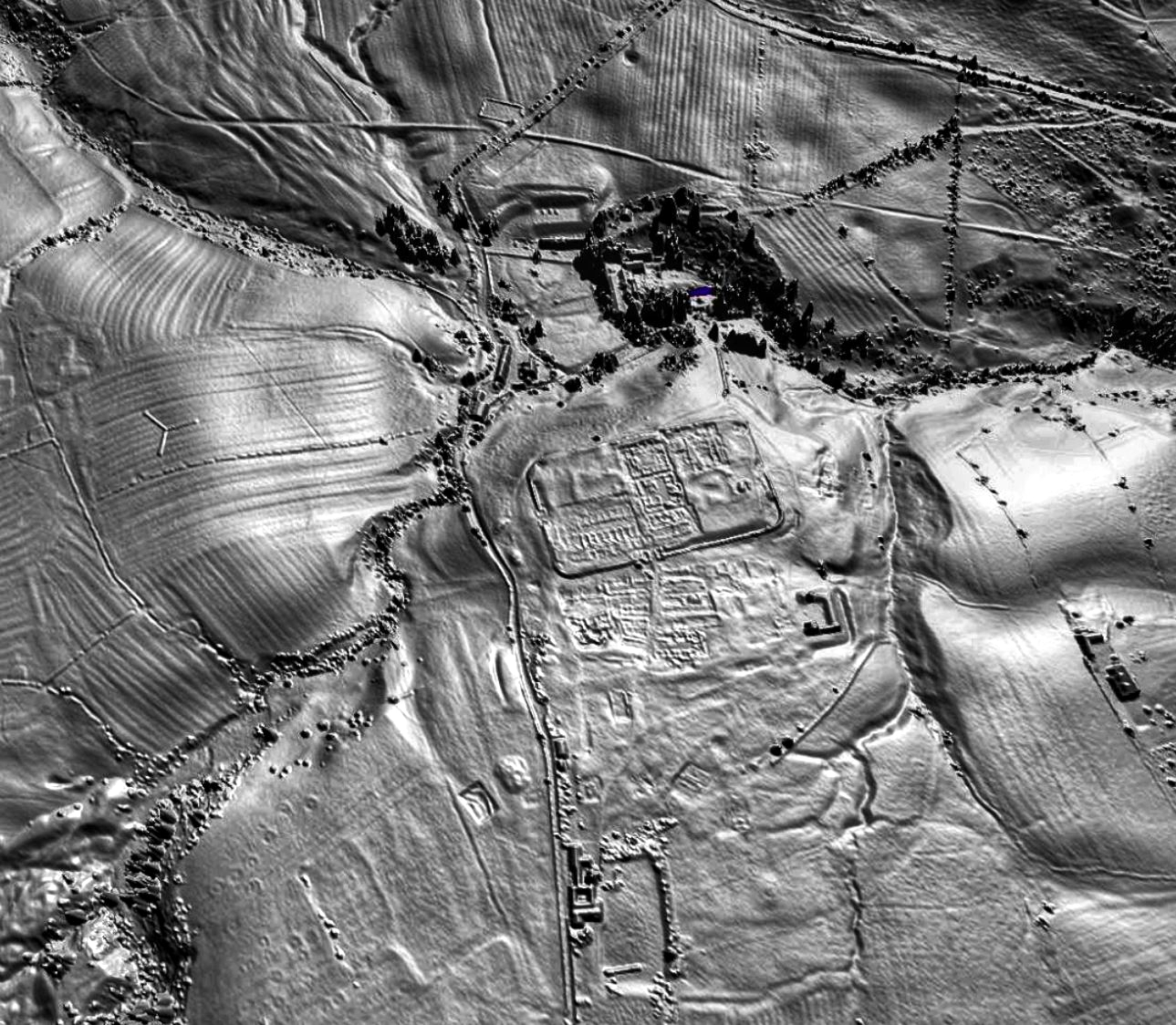
A vertical lidar view of Vindolanda

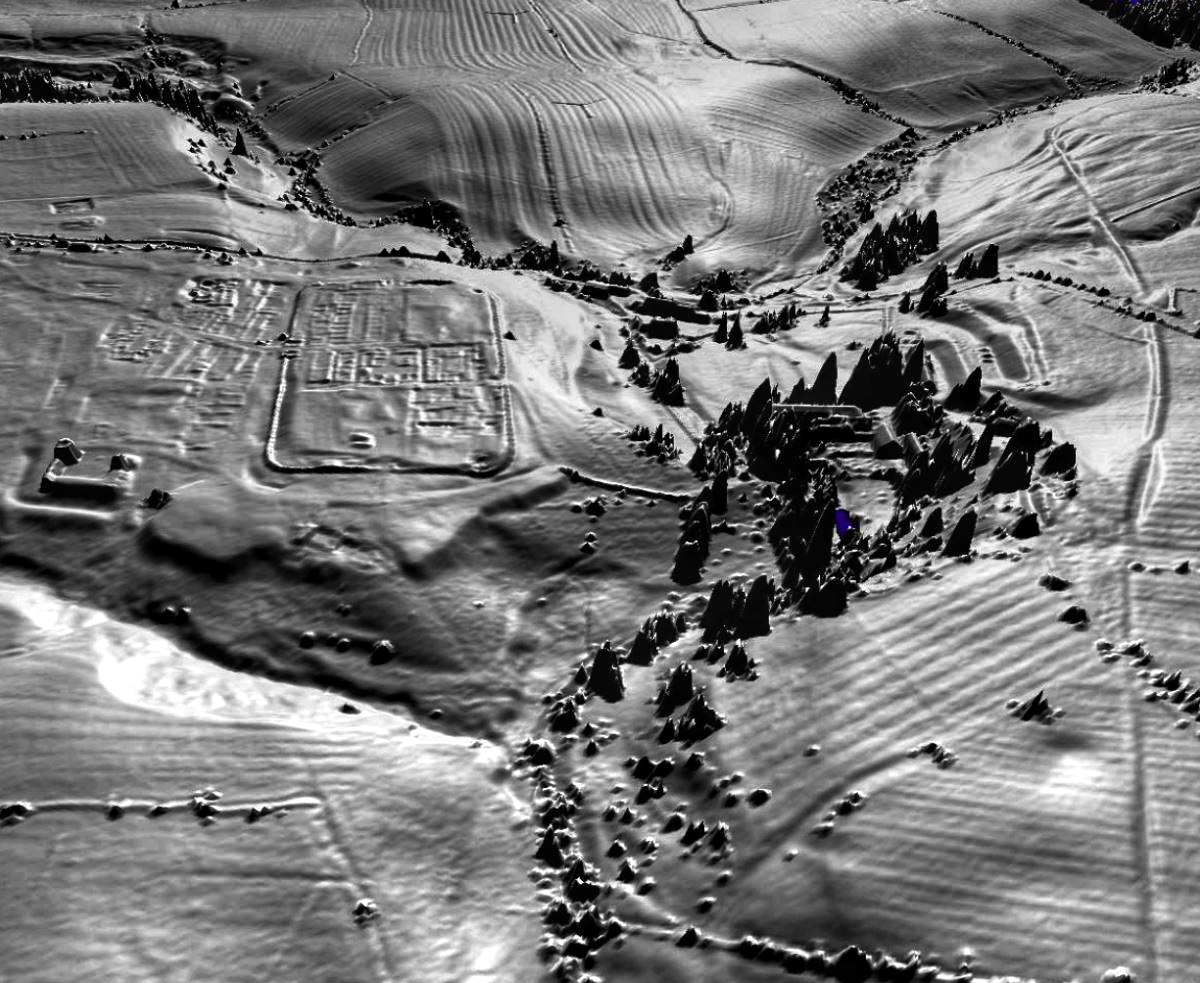
An oblique lidar view of Vindolanda

=== First timber fort (Period I) ===
The first timber fortress covers largely the same area as the stone fortress which is visible today, although on a slightly different alignment, and only a few sections of the outer ditch that surrounded the fortress have been excavated, at the western and southern sides. These contained various items of rubbish which were dumped there towards the end of the fort's life, including various wooden, leather, and metal objects, notably writing tablets, a toy wooden sword, the crest for a centurion's helmet, made from local hair moss, and an iron stylus. The date of this fort is placed ca. 85 AD by a cache of Samian ware and a coin of Vespasian.

=== Second timber fort (Period II) ===
The second timber fort was about twice the size of the first fort and, unlike the first fort, it was aligned with the cardinal directions. The remains of this layer are up to 13 feet (4 m) below the modern ground level. The western portion of the wattle and daub timber praetorium (headquarters), the fortress' south gate, and adjacent parts of the south rampart have been excavated. Dendrochronology suggests that the date of construction was 92 AD or shortly thereafter.

The preserved portion of the praetorium consists of fifteen rooms from the western part of the structure (A–K, M–P), the western edge of the internal courtyard (Q), and a water tank in the courtyard (L). The floors were made of hard-packed clay, covered by a 2 1/4–2 5/8-foot (0.7–0.8 m) thick "carpet" of bracken, which was probably replaced annually. This bracken preserved many metal and organic items, including several writing tablets and tent fragments. The water tank was 35 1/4 feet (10.75 m) long, 10 1/4 feet (3.125 m) wide, and 4 feet (1.26 m) deep. The sides were made of wattle and daub. It was filled from the north by a conduit.

The south rampart was made of turf and was 15 feet (4.5 m) wide. The south gate was a 10 5/8-foot-wide (3.23 m) cutting in this rampart. At each side of the gateway, the turf was held in place with horizontal wooden boards of alder, reinforced by four large oak posts on each side. There was a lintel of softwood held in place by the oak posts and iron spikes. There was probably a guard chamber above the gateway, supported by the oak posts. The gateway sat in a dip in the ground, through which water drains off the fortress site. Clay, tree branches, and split logs were buried to the north of the gateway in unsuccessful attempts to ameliorate the resulting instability of the ground.

==== Pre-Hadrianic bathhouse ====
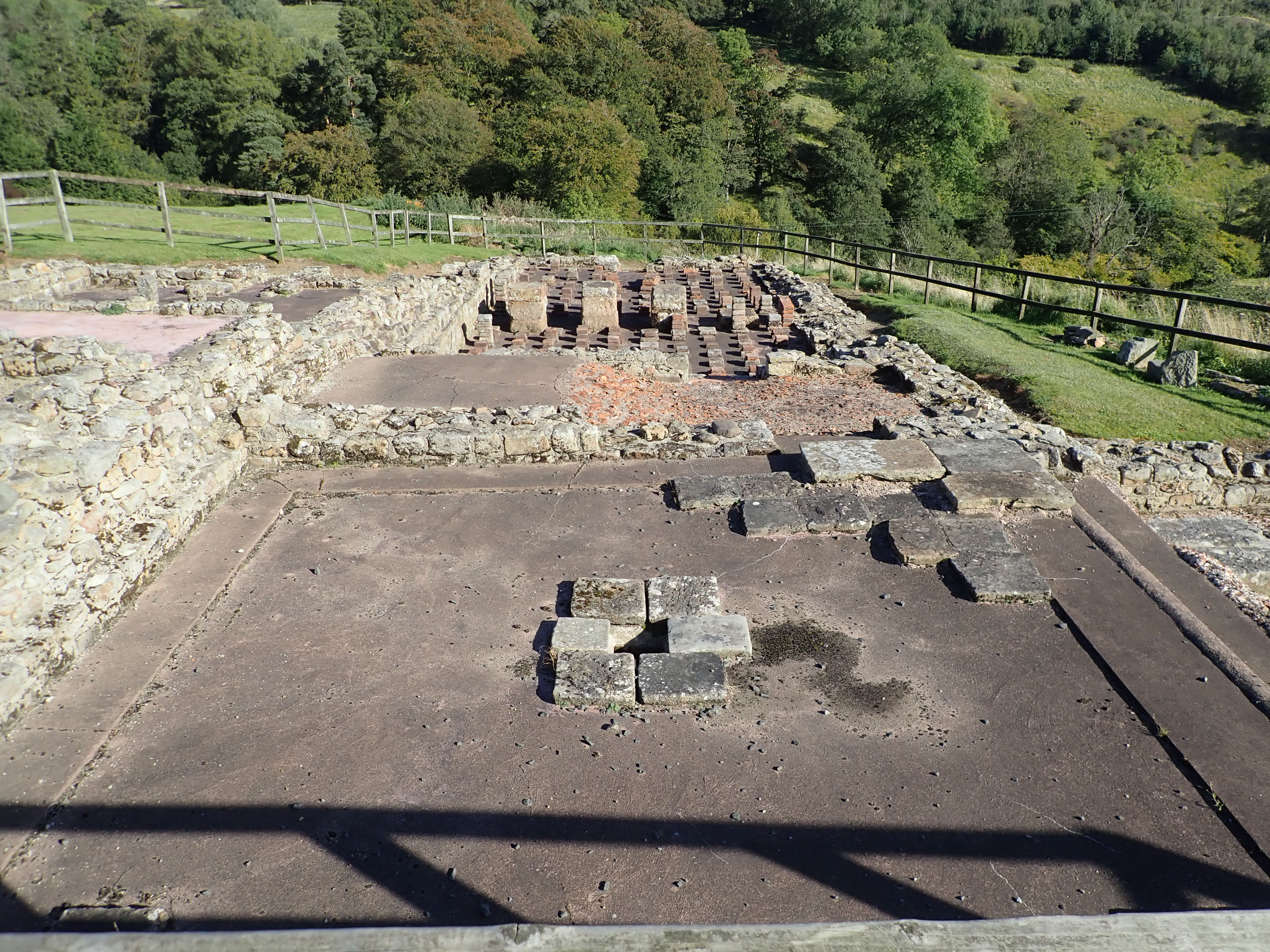
View of the Pre-Hadrianic bathhouse, looking east from the cold rooms towards the hot rooms and main furnace

The pre-Hadrianic bathhouse was located outside the fortress, southeast of the gate, just above a steep drop down to Doe Sike stream. It is a Reihentyp bathhouse, consisting of a set of rooms laid out in a line, which the bather passed through in sequence. The cold rooms were located at the west end. The hot rooms with hypocaust floors and the furnace were at the east end. An additional furnace and heated room were added on the north side and a cold plunge pool was added on the south side at the west end. There was a separate latrine building just south of the cold plunge pool. A writing tablet indicates that it was built in Period II. The work was done by the local cohort, providing clear evidence that auxiliary cohorts and not just legionary troops, were capable of complex construction projects. The bricks and tiles for the building were probably manufactured on site. In subsequent periods, the garrison decreased in size and it became too big to run efficiently, so it was demolished in the mid-second century at the latest.

=== Third timber fort (Period III) ===
The third timber fort was built on the same location and with the same layout as the second fort, but to a higher quality. The only excavated structures are the western portion of the praetorium and the south gate. Most of the Vindolanda tablets (128) derive from bonfires of official correspondence and other rubbish that was set to the west of the praetorium and was extinguished by rain and coated with mud before the first had a chance to incinerate them. A structure to the north of the praetorium might be the principia (headquarters), but the layout of the structure, although poorly known, seems unusual for this. The remains are about ten feet (three metres) below the current ground level. The tablets indicate that this period ran from 97–105 AD.

The explored portion of the praetorium is 166 1/8-foot-long (50.65 m) north-south and was at least 102 1/2-foot-wide (31.25 m) east-west (although only the westernmost 53 3/8 ft (16.25 metres) has been uncovered). This makes it one of the largest praetoria known from Britain. The interior walls were supported on horizontal oak beams, with uprights of alder and birch, and the spaces between filled in with wattle and daub, which was covered over with a plaster wash. The internal floors were dirt or timber, covered with a layer of bracken which was harvested in July–August, dried for a month, and then used for a year as a kind of 'carpet'. Many small objects were found lodged within this layer, as well as loads of nuts, shells, pupae of stable flies, and traces of excrement and urine. As a result, the rooms would have been smelly and unhygienic, but warm.

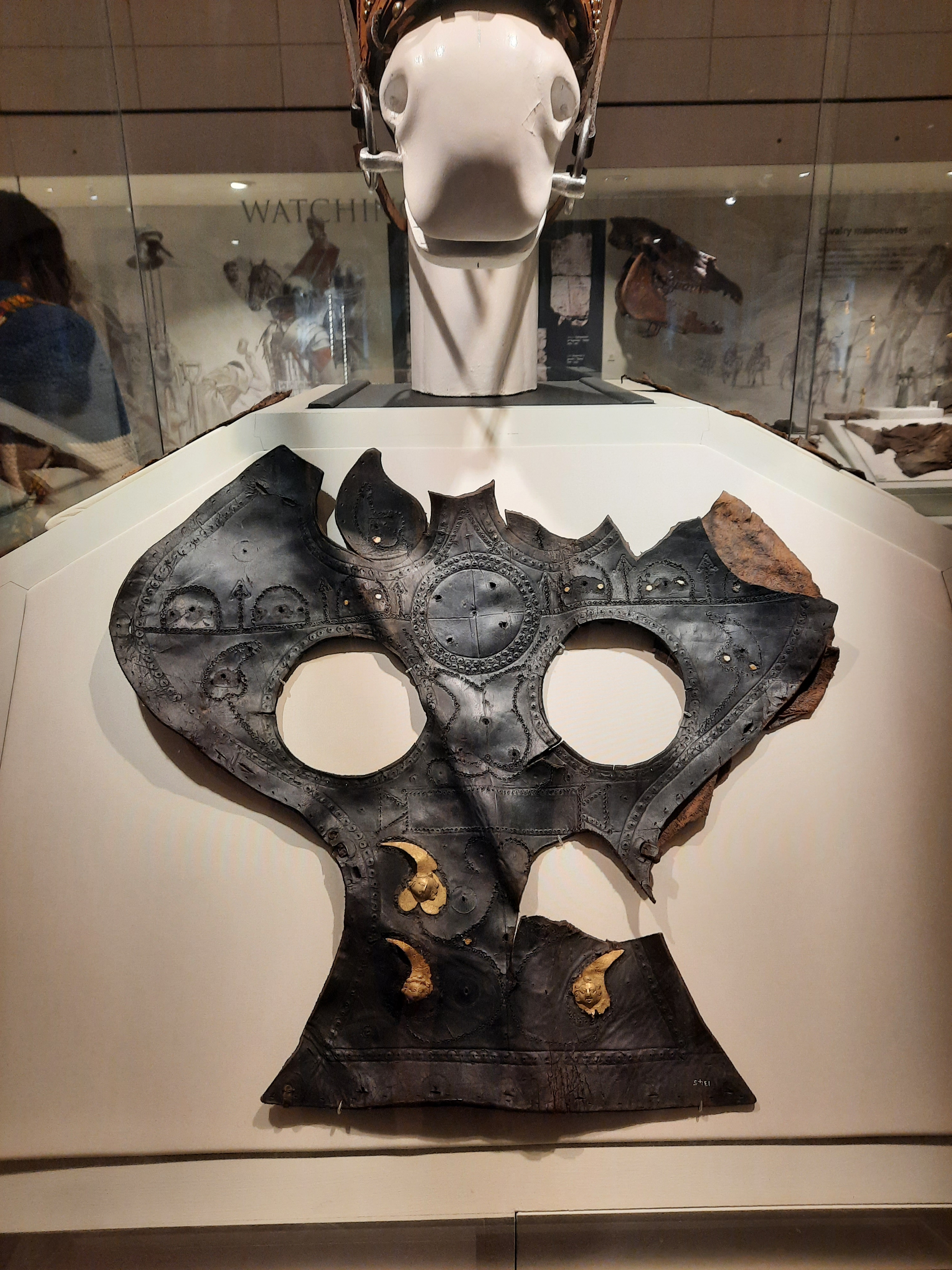
The chamfron recovered from Room XI

Nineteen rooms have been identified (I–V, VIII–XII, XIV–XXII), as well as a yard at the southwest corner (VIA–VIB) and an internal courtyard (VII and XIII). Room II, a large room in the southwest corner, measuring 31 by 18 feet (9.5 m × 5.5 m), with heavy beams to support an upper story, was probably used by the prefect for public audiences. Room IV, a long, narrow room (23 1/4 by 8 feet or 7.1 m × 2.45 m) to the west contained many writing tablets, suggesting that it was a scribal office. Room VIII was a small kitchen (9 3/4 by 9 3/4 feet or 2.95 m × 2.95 m), including two small bread ovens and a rubbish pit, containing several writing tablets relating to its operations. It had an attached store room for kitchen supplies (Room V), with a wooden floor made from a recycled tabletop (13 1/4 by 9 5/8 feet or 4.05 m × 2.95 m). The southwest yard (VIA) contained the two bonfires of the Vindolanda tablets and a rubbish dump. The east-west corridor, Room IX, was the servants' entrance to the praetorium from the road to the west. It connected to a north-south corridor, Room XII, which allowed access to Rooms X–XI and XV–XVII. At the northern end it led to the east-west corridor, Room XXI. Room X (9 7/8 by 15 3/4 feet or 3 m × 4.8 m) was not fully cleared during the abandonment of the site. It contained a stack of oak roof-tiles, several metal, textile, and leather objects. Room XI (14 by 15 3/4 feet or 4.25 m × 4.8 m) contained the best preserved section of wall, as well as some unique objects: a sock, a nearly complete chamfron. Room XVIII (21 1/8 by 16 feet or 6.45 m × 4.86 m) in the northwest corner of the praetorium, accessed from corridor Room XXI, was the forge. A partition split the western part of the room in half. There were seven pits in the northeast corner. The whole floor was covered with 40 mm (1 5/8 inches) of coal dust, charcoal, and ash, containing hundreds of fragments of bronze, iron, and lead objects, largely military in nature. Rooms XV–XVII to the east of corridor Room XII were accessed from the courtyard to the east. They were probably workspaces for the slaves of the prefect. Interesting finds included a comb in its leather case, a crowbar left lodged in the wall, gutting knives, barrel staves with brands and writing indicating that they had been imported from the Rhone valley. The courtyard (VII and XIII) was cobbled and had three long oak mechanisms of unknown purpose embedded in it.

The south gate was 6 7/8 feet (2.08 m) west of its predecessor in the second timber fort, in order to decrease the amount of runoff flowing through it. Like its predecessor, it cut through the turf rampart wall. The sides of the gateway consisted of three pairs of oak posts on each side supported timber planks which held the soil of the rampart in place. The roadway was composed of clay with stone chippings on top.

A wooden pipe carried water from wells near the western edge of the plateau to the centre of the fortress. The pipe consists of a series of alder trunks with holes bored through the centre. These are joined together and held in place by oak boxes between each stretch. Dendrochronology shows that the logs were chopped down in 97 AD.

==== Romano-Celtic temple ====
A small temple was built outside the fortress to the west in this period. It was a stone structure, with a cella measuring 16 3/4 by 11 1/2 feet (5.12 m × 3.5 m). There was a doorway in the midde of the southern wall and a covered walkway running around the outside of the structure. It seems to be mentioned in contemporary writing tablets. In the second-century AD, it was demolished and converted into a cemetery for cremations. A votive altar has been found, but the surviving portion of the inscription names the worshipped god only as deo ("the god").

After the abandonment of the third fort in 105 AD, there was a short period when the site was left uninhabited. Then it was levelled, covered in a layer of clay and turf up to 85 cm (33 inches) deep and a new fortress was built. Dendrochronology indicates that this took place within a year or so of 105.

=== Fourth timber fort (Period IV) ===
The fourth fort was built on the same alignment as the second and third fortresses, but extended 200 feet (60 m) further west, making it the largest fortress ever built on the site. A large 'palatial building', a schola (junior officers' mess hall), and a barracks have been identified. Other remains have proven difficult to identify due to interference from later structures built on top and the decayed state of the soft wood used in the construction of the fortress.

The 'palatial building' was located north of the earlier praetorium. It was a timber building surrounding a central courtyard, but only the western portion has been uncovered. Three rooms have floors made of opus signinum. The walls were coated in plaster and there are signs of a private bath at the northeastern corner of the excavated area. The excavators suggest that it was built to house emperor Hadrian while he supervised the construction of Hadrian's Wall in 122 AD.

West of the 'palatial building' was another large wooden structure, which has been identified as a schola. The finds from the structure were mostly linked with cooking and eating, but there were also some writing tablets. Extensive traces of ash and soot show that the structure was destroyed in a fire.

The barracks occupied the site of the earlier praetorium. The area was subsequently the western ditch of stone fort I and the remains of the barracks have been heavily damaged by as a result. Nevertheless, it is clear that the structure consisted of fourteen single-room apartments (contubernia), in two rows, seven facing west and seven facing east, back to back, with a verandah running along the front on each side. At a later stage, the eastern verandah was converted into additional accommodation space. Each of the contubernia may have housed up to ten tightly packed soldiers. Finds of small shoes may have belonged to the soldiers' children and wives or to slave-boys serving the soldiers. At the north end of the structure there were two larger dwellings, each consisting of a front room and a hallway leading to two back rooms, each equivalent in size to a contubernium. These apartments were probably for the centurions commanding the rest of the soldiers in the barracks. Several long writing tablets were found in one of these quarters, including an appeal to someone addressed as "your majesty," perhaps the emperor Hadrian. Several more writing tablets, shoes, styli, combs, leather, ballista bolts, tools, and other metal objects were found throughout the building. Room XV contained dump including over a thousand leather fragments from a soldier's tent.

Roughly thirty meters west of the 'palatial building', schola, and barracks are traces of a large courtyard with rooms around it. Loose finds included bronze probes, tweezers, spoons, knives, razors, and needles. The structure was probably an infirmary. West of this infirmary were traces of another structure, which might be a barracks.

Very large oak posts for a fortification wall have been uncovered to the west. The posts measure 2 by 2 feet (0.6 m × 0.6 m) and are found every 21 feet (6.5 m) for a distance of more than 115 feet (35 m). Dendrochronology shows that these posts date between 102 and 112 AD.

=== Fifth timber fort (Period V) ===
The fifth timber fort is the most poorly attested period on the site, because it was largely destroyed when the foundations for the first stone fort were dug. In the area of the earlier praetoria, a large multi-functional workshop (fabrica) was uncovered which measured 157 feet (48 m) north-south and about 66 feet (20 m) east-west. It consisted of one narrow room running down the whole west side, several large square rooms in the centre, and a series of small rooms along the east side. Large flagstones were used for the floors. The walls consisted of thick alder and oak posts with boards in between. Many of the rooms had substantial layers of coal dust and iron slag. Room 9 contained a large forge (5 1/4 by 2 feet or 1.6 m × 0.6 m). Rooms 8 and 10 contained pits 4–5 feet (1.2–1.5 m) deep.

Another fabrica has been found further to the west, a courtyard building measuring 84 by 52 feet (25.7 m × 15.7 m) or more, in which every building had a hearth.

=== Stone forts, stone huts ===
A stone fort was built at Vindolanda, possibly for the 2nd Cohort of Nervians. The old stone fort was demolished, and replaced by an unconventional set of army buildings on the west, and an unusual array of many round stone huts where the old fort had been. Some of these circular huts are visible by the north and the southwest walls of the final stone fort. The Roman army may have built these to accommodate families of British farmers in this unsettled period. The stone buildings were demolished, and a large new stone fort was built where the huts had been, for the 4th Cohort of Gauls.

=== Vicus ===
A vicus, a self-governing village, developed to the west of the fort. The vicus contains several rows of buildings, each containing several one-room chambers. Most are not connected to the existing drainage system. The one that does was perhaps a butchery where, for health reasons, an efficient drain would have been important. A stone altar found in 1914 (and exhibited in the museum) proves that the settlement was officially a vicus and that it was named Vindolanda. To the south of the fort is a thermae (a large imperial bath complex), that would have been used by many of the individuals on the site. The later stone fort, and the adjoining village, remained in use until about 285 AD, when it was largely abandoned for unknown reasons.

=== 4th-century forts ===
About 300 AD, the fort was again rebuilt, but the vicus was not reoccupied, so most likely the area remained too unsafe for life outside the defended walls of the fort. In about 370, the fort was roughly repaired, perhaps by irregular soldiers. There is no evidence for the traditional view that Roman occupation ended suddenly in 410; it may have declined slowly.

== History of investigation ==
=== Early accounts ===
The first post-Roman record of the ruins at Vindolanda was made by the antiquarian William Camden, in his Britannia (1586). Occasional travellers reached the site over the next two hundred years, and the accounts they left predate much of the stone-stealing that has damaged the site. The military Thermae (bath-house) was still partly roofed when Christopher Hunter visited the site in 1702. In about 1715 an excise officer named John Warburton found an altar there, which he removed.

In 1814 the first real archaeological work was begun, by the Rev. Anthony Hedley, but he died in 1835, without writing up his discoveries. Little more was done for a long time, although in 1914 a workman found another altar at the site, set up by the civilians living at the fort in honour of the Divine House and Vulcan. Several names for the site are used in the early records, including "Chesters on Caudley", "Little Chesters", "The Bower" and "Chesterholm"; the altar found in 1914 confirmed that the Roman name for the site was "Vindolanda", which had been in dispute as one early source referred to it as "Vindolana".

=== Excavation ===
In the 1930s, the house at Chesterholm where the museum is now located was purchased by archaeologist Eric Birley, who was interested in excavating the site. This became the family home of Eric and his wife Margaret "Peggy" Birley, a student of Eric's at Armstrong College who volunteered at the excavations at Vindolanda and Housestead, after she and Eric were married in 1934. The excavations have been continued by his sons, Robin and Anthony, and his grandson, Andrew Birley, and granddaughter-in-law Barbara Birley into the present day. They are undertaken each summer.

=== Findings ===
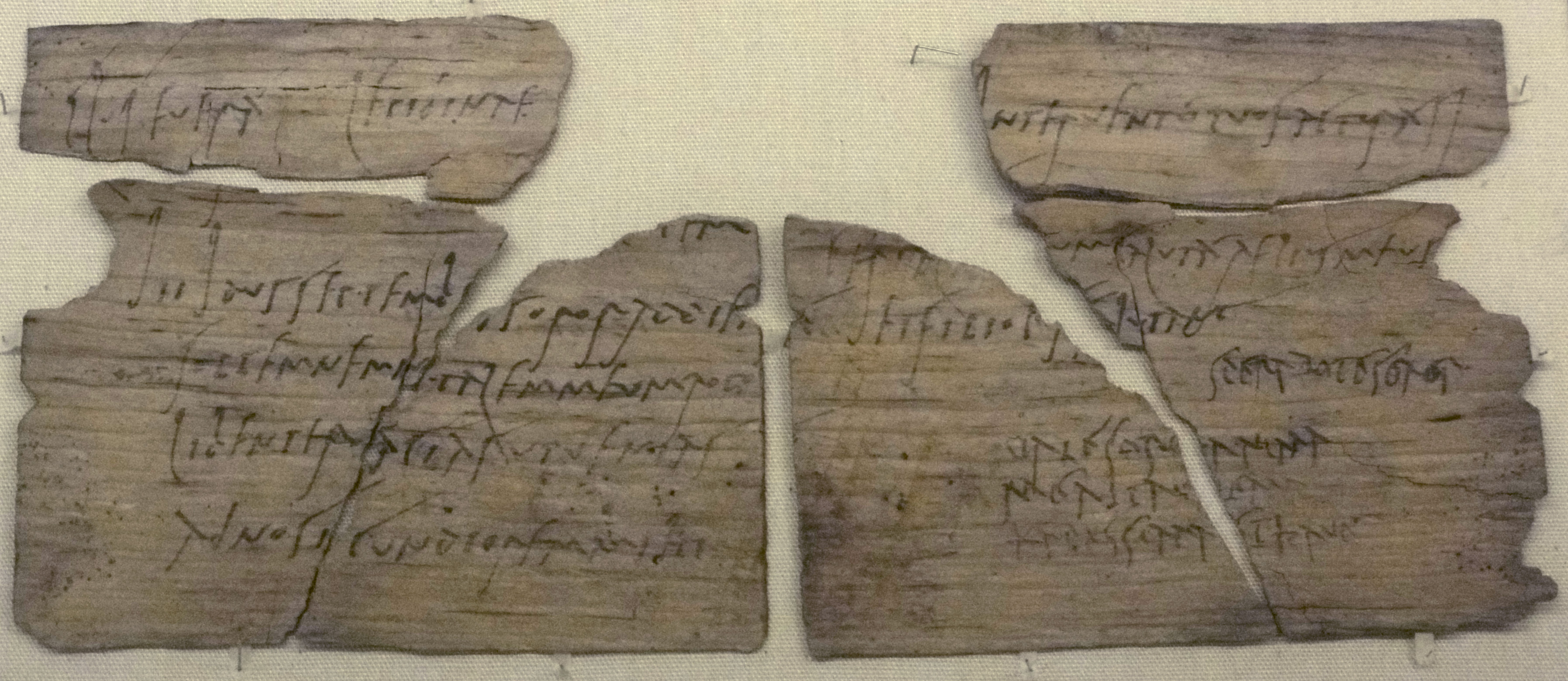
Vindolanda tablet 291

Some of the archaeological deposits reach depths of 20 feet (6 m). The anoxic conditions at these depths have preserved thousands of artefacts made of organic materials that normally disintegrate in the ground, (Note: The bacteria responsible for degrading organic matter require oxygen.) thus providing an opportunity to gain a fuller understanding of Roman life – military and otherwise – on the northern frontier. The most notable of these finds are the 850 ink tablets The study of these ink tablets shows a literacy among both the high born who lived there, as with the party invitation from one officer's wife to another and with soldiers and their families who send care packages with notes on the contents of the packages. Other artefacts found on the site include over 160 boxwood combs, most of a Roman military tent, and the largest known assemblage of Roman shoes. A study of spindle whorls from the north-western quadrant has indicated the presence of spinners of low- and high-status in the fort in the 3rd and 4th centuries AD.

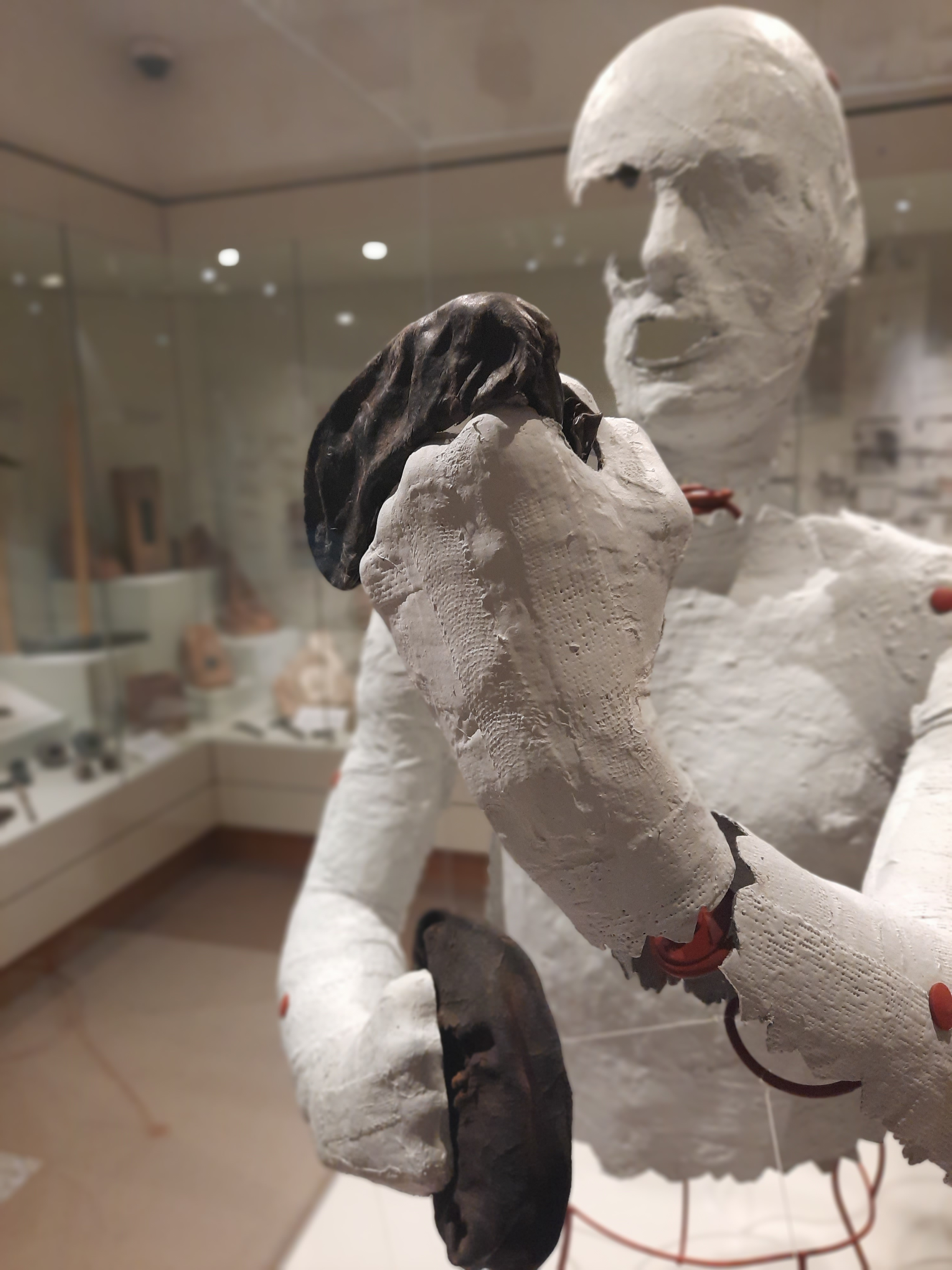
Boxing gloves found at Vindolanda

Nearly 2000-year-old Roman boxing gloves were uncovered at Vindolanda in 2017 by the Vindolanda Trust experts led by Dr Andrew Birley. According to The Guardian, being similar in style and function to the full-hand modern boxing gloves, these two gloves found at Vindolanda look like leather bands and date back to 120 AD. It is suggested that, based on their difference from gladiator gloves, warriors using this type of gloves had no purpose to kill each other. These gloves were probably used in a sport for promoting fighting skills. The gloves are currently displayed at Vindolanda's museum. According to Birley, they are not part of a matching pair:

The larger of the two gloves is cut from a single piece of leather and was folded into a pouch configuration, the extending leather at each side were slotted into one another forming a complete oval shape creating an inner hole into which a hand could still easily be inserted. The glove was packed with natural material acting as a shock absorber.

Recent excavations have been accompanied by new archaeological methodologies. 3-D imaging has been used to investigate the use of an ox cranium in target practice.

In 2021, a carved sandstone artifact was discovered a few inches below the floor of the fort. It depicts a nude warrior or deity before a horse or similar animal. Early interpretations point to the figure being of a Roman deity, perhaps of Mars or Mercury.

In February 2023, a 2,000 year-old disembodied 160 mm (6 5/16 in) long wooden phallus toy was revealed, according to the research published in the journal Antiquity.

=== Canid study ===
The site is noted for its canid remains.

=== Media attention ===
In addition to the older initial findings of ink tablets, shoes and combs, several more artifacts and discoveries of note have been covered by the media. In 2017, the British newspaper The Guardian focused on a discovery of cavalry barracks that were uncovered during the excavation season that held a large number of artifacts including swords, ink tablets, textiles, arrowheads, and other military paraphernalia. Relative dating of the barracks had determined that they were built around 105 AD. The Guardian also publicized the discovery of a cache of 25 ink tablets found earlier in the 2017 season. The tablets were discovered in a trench in one of the earliest layers of the fort, dating to the 1st century AD. This discovery was considered to be the second-largest discovery of ink tablets in the world, with the first being a cache that was also discovered at Vindolanda in 1992.

In the 2014 excavation season, the BBC ran a story about the discovery of one of the few surviving examples of a wooden toilet seat to be found in the Roman Empire. In the same year, they also recorded the discovery of the only gold coin ever to be found on the site with a mint date of 64 or 65 AD, lying in a site layer dating to the 4th century AD.

In 2010, the BBC announced the discovery of the remains of a child between the ages of 8 and 10 years, which was uncovered in a shallow pit in a barrack room, in a position suggesting that its arms may have been bound. Further archaeological analysis indicated that it could be female. She is believed to have died about 1,800 years ago.

Another find publicised on the BBC website in 2006 was of a bronze and silver fibula modelled with the figure of Mars, with the name Quintus Sollonius punched into its surface.

In 2020, archaeologists discovered a 5th-century chalice covered in religious iconography, within a collapsed church structure. The chalice featured crosses, angels, a smiling priestly figure holding a crook, fish, a whale, ships and the Greek letters chi-rho. In addition, the chalice bears scripts written in Latin, Greek, and possibly Ogham.

=== Site museum ===
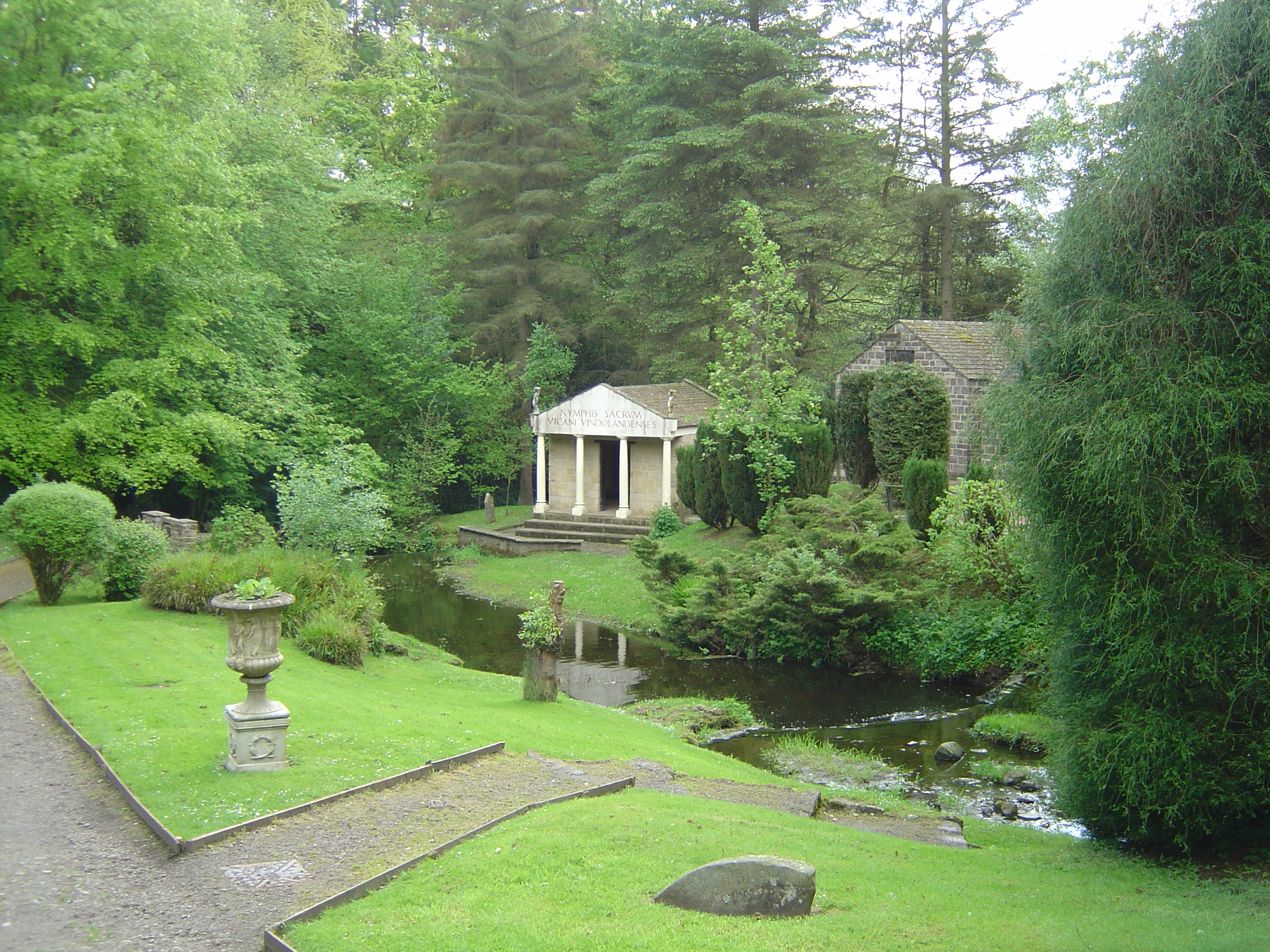
Gardens outside the museum

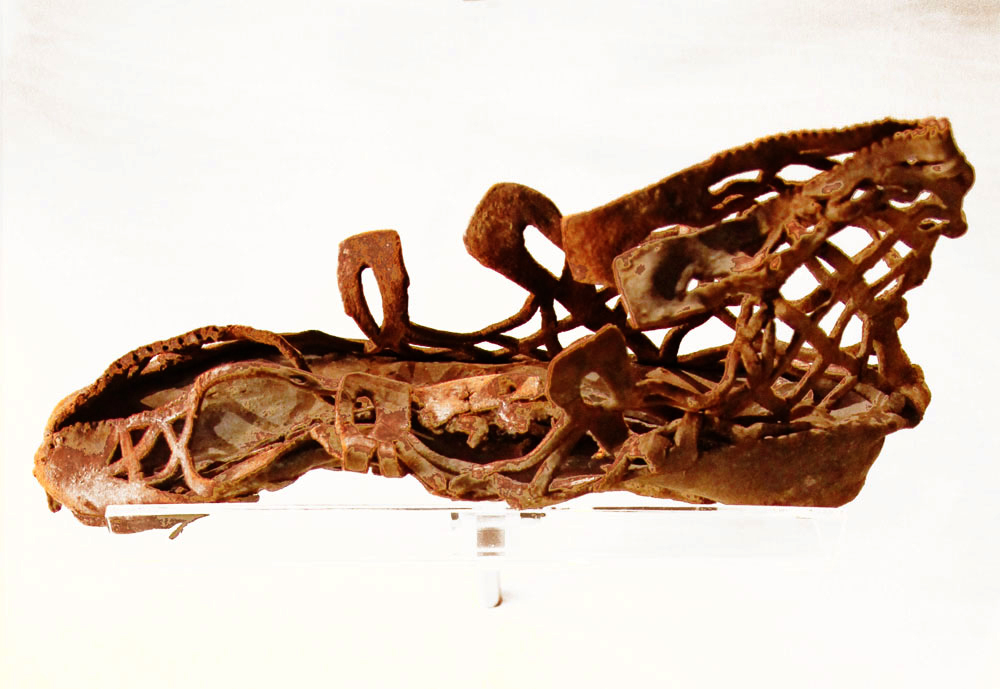
Sandal found at Vindolanda and now on display in the Museum

The Vindolanda site museum, also known as Chesterholm Museum, conserves and displays finds from the site. The museum is set in gardens, which include full-sized reconstructions of a Roman temple, a Roman shop, a Roman house and Northumbrian croft, all with audio presentations. Exhibits include Roman boots, shoes, armour, jewellery and coins, infrared photographs of the writing tablets and, from 2011, a small selection of the tablets themselves, on loan from the British Museum. 2011 saw the reopening of the museum at Vindolanda, and also the Roman Army Museum at Magnae Carvetiorum (Carvoran), refurbished with a grant from the Heritage Lottery Fund.

A full-size replica of two sections of Hadrian's Wall, in turf and in stone was built on the site in 1973.

=== Vindolanda Trust ===
In 1970, the Vindolanda Trust, a registered charity, was founded to administer the site and its museum. In 1997, the Trust took over the running of the Roman Army Museum at Carvoran, another Hadrian's Wall fort to the West, which it had acquired in 1972. The current Curator of the Vindolanda Trust is Barbara Birley. As of 2009, the Trust was the largest employer in Bardon Mill.

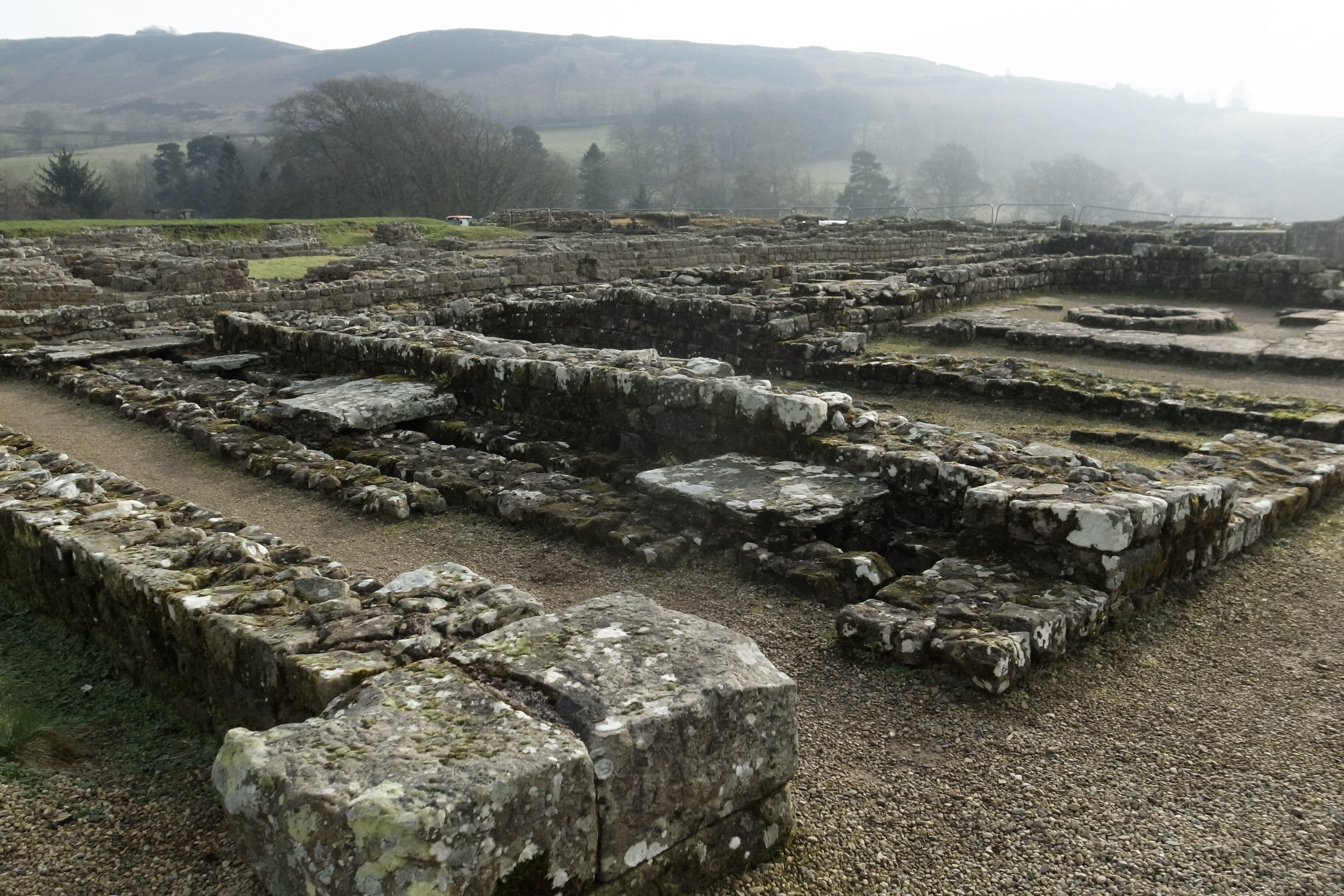

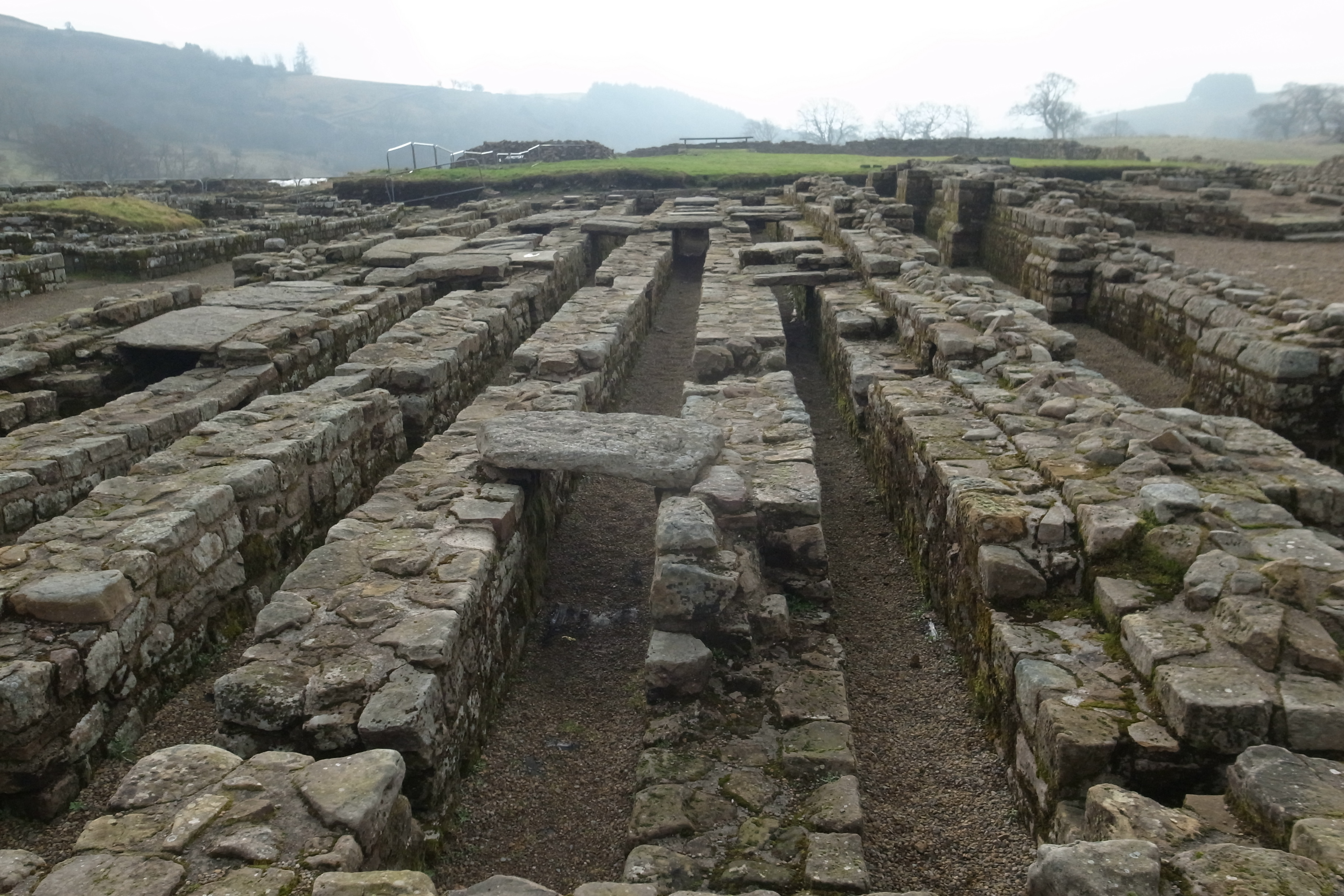

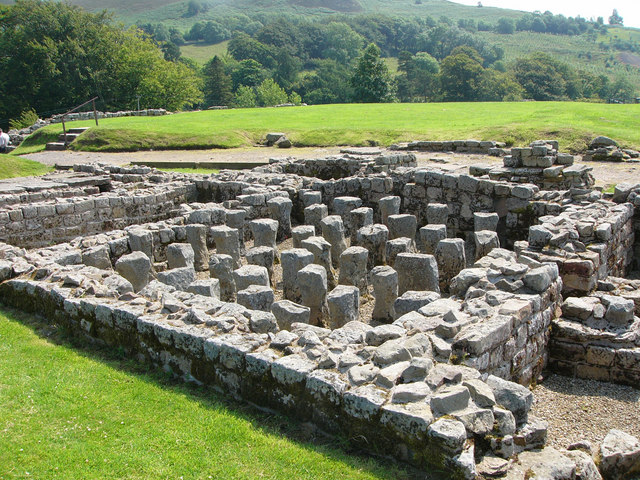

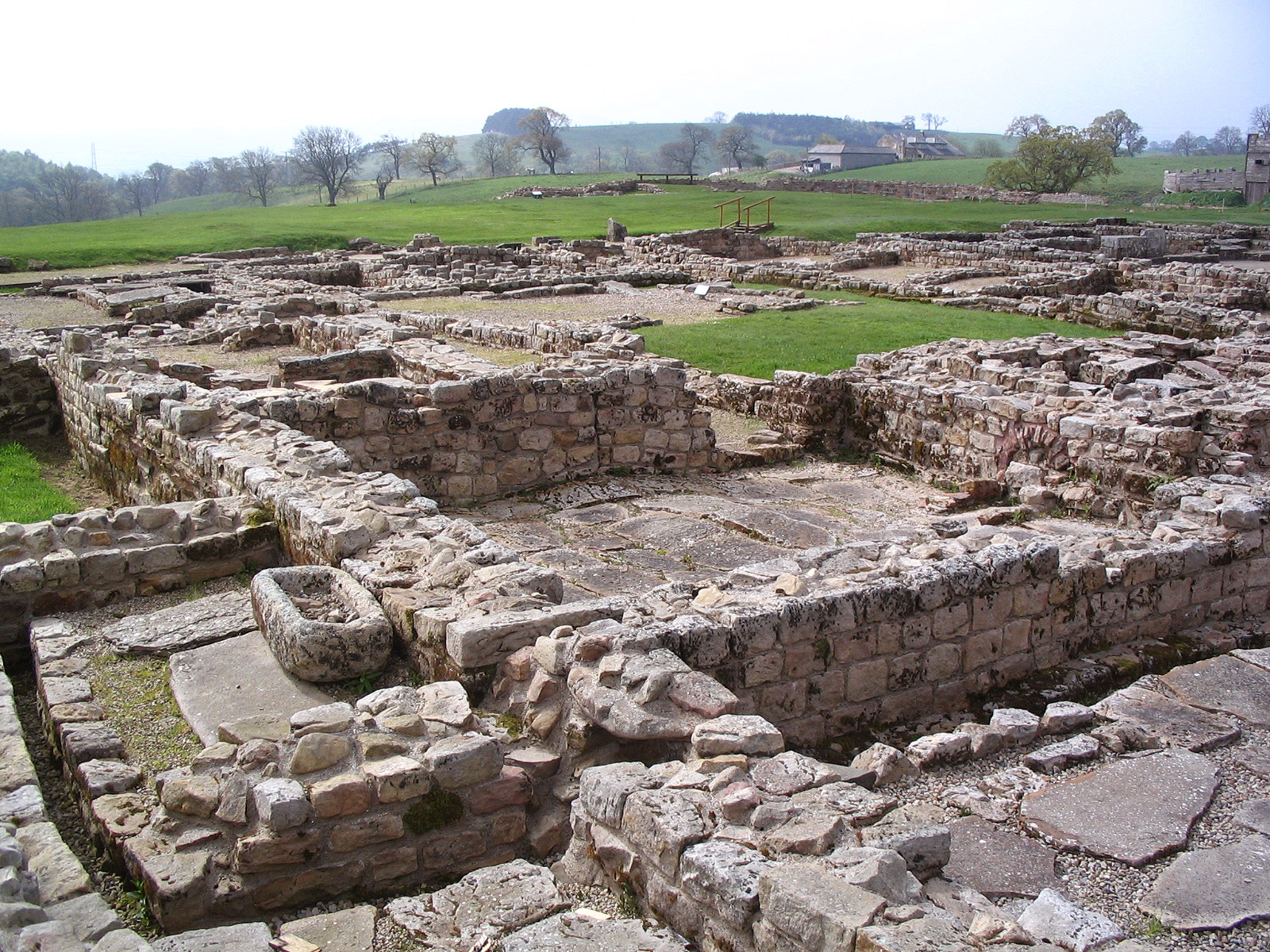

== See also ==
- Vindolanda tablets
- History of Northumberland
- Minimus, Latin textbooks for primary-school children, using stories based in Vindolanda

== Bibliography ==
- Birley, Robin (2009). Vindolanda: a Roman frontier fort on Hadrian's Wall. Stroud: Amberley. ISBN 978-1-84868-210-8.
- Birley, Robin (2012). Vindolanda Guide: the home of Britain's finest treasures. Greenhead: Roman Army Museum Publications. ISBN 978-1-873136-59-1.
- Selkirk, Andrew (2006). "A ritual statue from Vindolanda". Current Archaeology. Vol. 205. pp. 4–5. ISSN 0011-3212.
