= Anthony Birley =

British archaeologist (1937–2020)

Anthony Richard Birley FSA
- Born: 8 October 1937; Chesterholm, Northumberland, England
- Died: 19 December 2020 (aged 83)

Academic background
- Education: Magdalen College, Oxford

Academic work
- Discipline: Archaeology and classics
- Sub-discipline: Roman archaeology
- Institutions: University of Oxford; University of Birmingham; University of Leeds; Victoria University of Manchester; Heinrich Heine University Düsseldorf; Vindolanda Trust

Anthony Richard Birley FSA (8 October 1937 – 19 December 2020) was a British ancient historian, archaeologist and academic. He was one of the leaders of excavations at the Roman fortress of Vindolanda and also published several books on Roman Britain and Roman emperors of the second-century AD.

== Early life and education ==
Anthony Birley was the son of the archaeologists Eric Birley and Margaret "Peggy" Birley. Eric bought the house next to the archeological site Vindolanda where Anthony and his brother, Robin, began to excavate the site. The brothers took part in many of the excavations there. From 1950 to 1955, Anthony studied at Clifton College, a private school in Bristol, England. He studied classics at Magdalen College, Oxford, graduating with a first-class Bachelor of Arts (BA) degree in 1960. He remained at the University of Oxford, and completed his Doctor of Philosophy (PhD) degree in 1966: his doctoral thesis was titled "The Roman high command from the death of Hadrian to the death of Caracalla, with particular attention to the Danubian wars of M. Aurelius and Commodus".

== Career ==
Birley remained at the University of Oxford with a Craven Fellowship from 1960 to 1962, and was then a research fellow at the University of Birmingham. He moved to the University of Leeds as a lecturer, and was later promoted to Reader. He was the Professor of Ancient History at the University of Manchester (1974–1990) and additionally at the University of Düsseldorf (1990–2002). He was an Honorary Professor in the Department of Classics and Ancient History at the University of Durham.

He was elected as Fellow of the Society of Antiquaries of London (FSA) in 1969, and was a corresponding Member of the German Archaeological Institute (1981) and a member of Nordrhein-Westfälische Akademie der Wissenschaften from 1994 to 2002.

Birley was a founder trustee of the Vindolanda Trust since 1970 and remained in this role until 2016, having also served as the Chair of Trustees from 1996 to 2016.

== Personal life ==
Birley was married to Susanna Garforth-Bles in 1963; they had two children, Ursula born 1964 and Hamish born 1966. They divorced in 1986. In 1989 he married Heide. and gained three step-children

Birley died of lung cancer on 19 December 2020.

== Selected publications ==
- Hadrian's Wall: an illustrated guide. London: Her Majesty's Stationery Office (HMSO) (1963).
- Imperial Rome with drawings by the artist. Alan Sorrell London: Lutterworth Press (1970)
- Life in Roman Britain (1972)
- Lives of the Later Caesars (1976)
- The Fasti of Roman Britain, Clarendon Press (1981)
- Septimius Severus: The African Emperor (1972, revised edition 1988)
- Roman Papers, vol. 6, by Ronald Syme, edited by A. R. Birley (Clarendon Press 1991)
- The People of Roman Britain (1992)
- Marcus Aurelius: a Biography, London: Routledge, (1993)
- Anatolica - Studies in Strabo, by Ronald Syme, edited by A. R. Birley (Oxford: OUP 1995)
- Vindolanda Research Reports (new series) 6 vols. (1996)
- Hadrian: the Restless Emperor, London: Routledge, (1997)
- Eques Romanus - Reiter und Ritter (in German) by Michel Stemmler, edited by A. R. Birley (Peter Lang GmbH, 1997)
- Onomasticon to the Younger Pliny, Clarendon Press (2000)
- Garrison Life at Vindolanda: a Band of Brothers, Stroud: Tempus, (2002)
- The Roman Government of Britain (2005)
- Agricola and Germany (2009)
