= Barbara Birley =

Museum curator

Barbara Birley FSA
- Born: Barbara Thorpe; February 15, 1976 (age 50); Englewood, Colorado, United States
- Spouse: Andrew Birley

Academic work
- Discipline: Archaeology
- Sub-discipline: Roman archaeology
- Institutions: Vindolanda Trust

Barbara Alison Birley FSA (born 15 February 1976) is an archaeologist and museum curator working at the Roman fort of Vindolanda, near Hadrian's Wall.

== Biography ==
Birley is the curator for the Vindolanda Trust, where she works on the conservation, cataloguing, and display of the Roman artefacts found at the fort, and serves as the Chair of the Roman Finds Group. She was elected as a fellow of the Society of Antiquaries of London on 17 June 2021.

Birley has published on the Roman jewellery and combs found at Vindolanda, as well as on public engagement with archaeology, including the 'Stories from the Frontier' project, which is developing a digital game to help visitors to Vindolanda engage with the site.

Birley is married to Andrew Birley, also an archaeologist working at Vindolanda.

== Select publications ==
- Birley, B. and Greene, E. 2006. The Roman Jewellery from Vindolanda (Research reports, New Series Vol IV). Vindolanda Trust.
- Birley, B. 2014. "A penannular brooch and two strap-ends from Vindolanda". Archaeologia Aeliana Series 5. Vol 43, pp. 73–76.
- Birley, B. 2016. "Keeping Up Appearances on the Romano-British Frontier", Internet Archaeology 42. doi:10.11141/ia.42.6.6
- Birley, B. 2018. "Stylising the functional: Wooden hair combs from Vindolanda", in Ivleva, T., De Bruin, J., and Driessen, M. (eds) Embracing the Provinces: Society and Material Culture of the Roman Frontier Regions. Oxbow Books. doi:10.2307/j.ctv13nb8qs
- Stocks, C., Birley, B., and Collins, R. 2018. "Stories from the Frontier: Linking Past and Present at Vindolanda through Digital Gameplay", Thersites 8. doi:10.34679/thersites.vol8.114
- Birley, B. and Griffiths, B. 2022. "From academic research to delivery: translating knowledge to deliver accessible and captivating programmes" in Alberti, M. & Mountain, K. (eds) Hadrian's Wall: Exploring its Past to Protect its Future. Archaeopress, pp. 34–45
