= David Peacock (archaeologist) =

British archaeologist (1939–2015)

- Born: 14 January 1939
- Died: 15 March 2015 (aged 76)
- Occupations: Classical archaeologist; Archaeological scientist
- Awards: Kenyon Medal (2011)

Academic background
- Education: Stamford School; University of St Andrews

Academic work
- Institutions: University of Birmingham; University of Southampton
- Notable students: Michael Fulford; Richard Hodges; Roberta Tomber

David Philip Spencer Peacock (14 January 1939 – 15 March 2015) was a British archaeologist. Educated at Stamford School and at the University of St Andrews, he spent most of his career at the University of Southampton, where he specialised in the scientific study of Roman pottery.

Peacock worked on the site of Carthage, alongside Michael Fulford, in the 1970s, where he developed techniques of studying pottery which became widely adopted in other Mediterranean excavations. Towards the end of the decade, he carried out ethnographic survey work on North African potteries, which formed the basis of an influential typology of ceramic production sites, and established principles of categorising ceramics that were widely adopted in British archaeology. From the late 1980s, he worked on Roman Egypt, directing a survey of the quarry at Mons Claudianus and co-directing the survey and excavation of Mons Porphyrites. He also proved the location of the Roman Red Sea port of Myos Hormos and mapped the ports of Adulis and Gabeza.

Peacock has been credited with establishing the discipline of ceramic petrography in Britain. He was awarded the Kenyon Medal for classical studies by the British Academy in 2011. An obituary in Times Higher Education called him "one of the most innovative archaeologists of his generation".

== Biography ==
David Philip Spencer Peacock was born on 14 January 1939. (Note: Keay 2015, p. 965. For Peacock's full name, see Tomber 2018, p. xiii.) He was educated at Stamford School, an all-boys independent school in Lincolnshire. While there, he took part in archaeological fieldwork at the encouragement of the medievalist John Hurst. He attended excavations at Snail Down, near Everleigh, during his time at the school, (Note: Reisz 2015. For the Snail Down excavations, see Thomas & Thomas 1955.) and also took part in the excavation of a medieval kiln that had produced Stamford ware pottery, which was discovered in 1963 after ceramic sherds were found on the school's playing fields. (Note: Reisz 2015. For the date, see Historic England Research Records–Monument Number 348006.)

Peacock subsequently studied at the University of St Andrews in Scotland, from which he received a BSc and, in 1965, a PhD in geology. He then moved to the University of Birmingham, where he held, from 1965 until 1968, a research fellowship titled "The Application of Science to Archaeology". In that year, he moved to the University of Southampton, where he spent the remainder of his career: he was promoted to professor in 1990. He served two terms, 1998–2001 and 2001–2003, as Head of Archaeology at Southampton.

From 1974, Peacock worked at the North African site of Carthage on the British-led UNESCO excavations (known as "Save Carthage"), which were directed by Henry Hurst. (Note: Reisz 2015; Keay 2015, p. 965. For the chronology of the excavations, see Hurst 1975, p. 11.) Alongside his doctoral student Michael Fulford, (Note: For Peacock's doctoral teaching of Fulford, see Keay 2015, p. 966.) he worked on the site's Roman-period pottery. In the late 1970s, he established the Ceramics Research Unit at Southampton, funded by English Heritage. With David F. Williams, he worked on promoting the reporting of finds of Roman amphorae from excavations in Britain, and on identifying the types of stone, including marble, used on Roman sites. In the late 1980s, he carried out the first large-scale survey of Roman pottery-production sites in the central and Sahel regions of Tunisia.

From the later 1980s, Peacock worked largely on Roman Egypt. Between 1987 and 1993, he directed the survey of Mons Claudianus, a Roman quarry in the Eastern Desert, as part of a project led by Jean Bingen. From 1994 until 1998, he co-directed the survey and excavation of Mons Porphyrites, in the Red Sea Hills, with Valerie Maxfield. In 1993, he demonstrated through the use of satellite imagery that the Roman Red Sea port of Myos Hormos was located at Quseir al Qadim, (Note: Tomber 2018, p. xiv. Peacock's findings were published as Peacock 1993.) and excavated there alongside Lucy Blue and Stephanie Moser between 1999 and 2003. Between 2004 and 2005, Peacock and Blue mapped the Red Sea ports of Adulis and Gabeza in Eritrea.

Peacock established the Highfield Press publishing company, which he handed over to his son Andrew to manage. He was married to Barbara. David Peacock retired in 2004, and died on 15 March 2015. An obituary in Times Higher Education called him "one of the most innovative archaeologists of his generation".

== Academic work ==
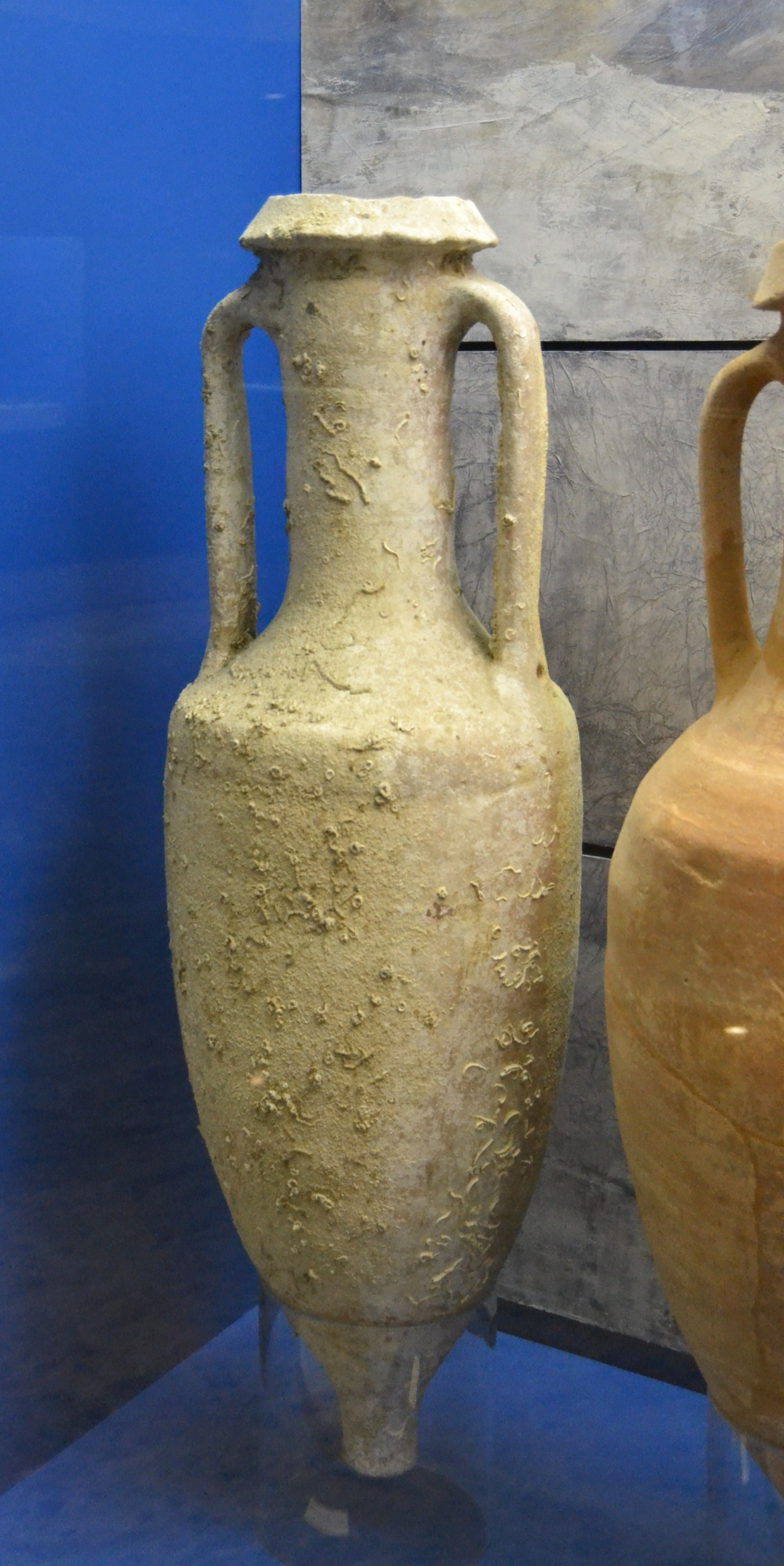
A Dressel 1 amphora in Valencia, Spain

Between 1967 and 1970, Peacock focused his work on the application of petrography (the mineralogical study of artefacts), whose application in British archaeology had previously focused on stone axes. Peacock applied the technique to pottery, making use of techniques normally used in geology, such as the microscopic analysis of thin sections of vessels to identify their clay's place of origin. He also developed the use of heavy-mineral analysis to identify the origin of pottery types, such as sand-tempered wares, which could not easily be provenanced by thin-section analysis. His work demonstrated that a series of bricks found at the Late Roman fort of Pevensey, then believed to be the only material evidence of the activity of the general Stilicho in Britain, were nineteenth-century forgeries, probably created by Charles Dawson.

Roberta Tomber, who was one of two students to complete Peacock's MSc course titled the "Scientific Analysis of Artefacts", credited two of his articles from this period with "radically chang[ing] British prehistory, [by] illustrating the movement of pottery beyond local regions". (Note: Tomber 2018, p. xiii. The articles in question are Peacock 1969a and Peacock 1969b.) In one of these papers, published in 1969, Peacock identified inclusions of gabbro in Neolithic coarseware pottery from around the south-west of England, which allowed him to trace its origin to a single source on The Lizard in Cornwall, and so to demonstrate that the pottery had been transported over longer distances than previously thought. The archaeologist Patrick Quinn has credited Peacock with establishing the discipline of ceramic petrography in the United Kingdom. (Note: Quinn 2013, p. 12. The paper is Peacock 1969a.)

Peacock's work advanced the study of Roman trade: in particular, he worked on the economic role of transport amphorae, the connections between Rome and India, and the economy of the city of Carthage. According to a 2015 obituary in The Times, his writings on the circulation of Roman pottery remained standard works on the subject. In his 1977 paper "Ceramics in Roman and Medieval Archaeology", he established principles and guidelines for characterising the fabric of ceramic finds that became standard in excavations of all periods in Britain, and became the basis of the National Roman Fabric Reference Collection. (Note: Evans, Brown & Knight 2016, pp. 254–255; Tomber & Dore 2017, "Background". The paper is Peacock 1977a.)

Peacock's 1982 work Pottery in the Roman World: An Ethnoarchaeological Approach applied his study of contemporary traditional potteries to those in earlier periods, and set forth a typology of ceramic production sites described as "classic" by the medieval archaeologist Chris Wickham in 2013. Reviewing the book, Richard Reece called it "just the shot in the arm that pottery studies needed", though criticised aspects of its methodology. Paul Nicholson and Helen Patterson further criticised what they saw as Peacock's failure to set forth how his proposed types of sites would be manifested and distinguishable in the archaeological record.

Prior to joining the excavations at Carthage, Peacock had worked on Dressel 1 amphorae from Britain, and he continued to work on these vessels at the site. The techniques that Peacock and Fulford applied to the analysis of pottery finds at Carthage became standard practice in Mediterranean excavations. These methods included using the fabric of potsherds to sort large ceramic assemblages, and the use of quantitative measurements such as the weighing of ceramic finds. They identified and named the Roman pottery style known as Pantellerian ware, after its origin on the island of Pantelleria: the use of thin-section analysis demonstrated that the pottery contained inclusions characteristic of the island's volcanic rock. The archaeologist Simon Keay described the two articles stemming from Peacock's survey work in Tunisia as "landmark". (Note: Keay 2015, p. 965. The articles are Peacock, Béjaoui & Ben Lazreg 1989 and Peacock, Béjaoui & Ben Lazreg 1990.)

Peacock also studied the trade in decorative stone throughout the Roman Empire, particularly that quarried in Egypt. Keay credited Peacock's work in Egypt with helping to illuminate the trading relationship between the Roman Empire and India. Later in his career, Peacock began to focus on research into millstones, a field on which he had previously published a 1980 article using petrography to trace the provenances of various examples from the Roman Empire. (Note: Tomber 2018, p. xiv. Peacock's article is Peacock 1980.) Keay described Peacock's 2013 monograph, The Stone of Life, as his magnum opus on the topic.

In 2011, Peacock was awarded the Kenyon Medal for classical studies by the British Academy; he received the Pomerance Award for scientific contributions to archaeology from the Archaeological Institute of America in 2012. (Note: Keay 2015, p. 966; "Dispatches From The AIA – March/April 2012". Archaeological Institute of America. 2012-03-01.) A Festschrift in his honour was published posthumously in 2016. (Note: The Festschrift is Sibbesson, Jervis & Coxon 2016.) His doctoral students included the archaeologists Richard Hodges, Jane Timby and Ian Whitbread.

== Published works ==
=== As co-author ===
- Peacock, David; Fulford, Michael (1984). The Avenue du Président Habib Bourguiba, Salammbo: The Pottery and Other Ceramic Objects from the Site. Excavations at Carthage – The British Mission. Vol. 1.2. Sheffield: University of Sheffield. ISBN 0906090172.
- Peacock, David; Williams, David F. (1986). Amphorae and the Roman Economy: An Introductory Guide. Longman Archaeology Series. London and New York: Longman. ISBN 0582493048.
- Peacock, David; Béjaoui, Fathi; Ben Lazreg, Nejib (1989). "Roman Amphora Production in the Sahel Region of Tunisia". Amphores romaine et histoire économique: dix ans de recherche: actes du colloque de Sienne (22–24 mai 1986) [Roman Amphorae and Economic History: Ten Years of Research: Proceedings of the Colloquium at Sienne (22–24 May 1986)]. Publications de l'École française de Rome. Vol. 114. Rome: French School at Rome. pp. 179–222. ISBN 2728301808 – via Persée.
- Peacock, David; Béjaoui, Fathi; Ben Lazreg, Nejib (1990). "Roman Pottery Production in Central Tunisia". Journal of Roman Archaeology. 3: 59–84. doi:10.1017/S1047759400010849. eISSN 2331-5709.
- Peacock, David; Fulford, Michael (1995). The Circular Harbour, North Side: The Pottery. Excavations at Carthage – The British Mission. Vol. 2.2. Oxford: Oxford University Press. ISBN 0197270042.
- Peacock, David; Maxfield, Valerie (1997). Survey and Excavation at Mons Claudianus, 1987–1993, Vol. 1: Topography and Quarries. Cairo: French Institute of Oriental Archaeology. ISBN 2724701925.
- Peacock, David; Maxfield, Valerie (2001). Survey and Excavation at Mons Claudianus, 1987–1993, Vol. 2: The Excavations. Cairo: French Institute of Oriental Archaeology. ISBN 2724702913.
- Maxfield, Valerie; Peacock, David (2001). The Roman Imperial Quarries: Survey and Excavation at Mons Porphyrites, 1994–1998, Vol. 1: Topography and Quarries. London: Egypt Exploration Society. ISBN 0856981524.
- Peacock, David; Blue, Lucy, eds. (2006). Myos Hormos – Quseir Al-Qadim: Roman and Islamic Ports on the Red Sea: Volume 1: The Survey and Report on the Excavations, 1999–2003. Oxford: Oxbow Books. ISBN 1842172034.
- Peacock, David; Maxfield, Valerie, eds. (2006). Survey and Excavation at Mons Claudianus, 1987–1993, Vol. 3: Ceramic Vessels and Related Objects. Cairo: French Institute of Oriental Archaeology. ISBN 2724704282.
- Peacock, David; Blue, Lucy, eds. (2007). The Ancient Red Sea Port of Adulis, Eritrea: Report of the Eritro-British Expedition, 2004–5. Oxford: Oxbow Books. ISBN 9781842173084.
- Maxfield, Valerie; Peacock, David (2007). The Roman Imperial Quarries: Survey and Excavation at Mons Porphyrites, 1994–1998, Vol. 2: The Excavations. London: Egypt Exploration Society. ISBN 085698180X.
- Peacock, David; Peacock, Andrew (2008). "The Enigma of 'Aydhab: A Medieval Islamic Port on the Red Sea Coast". International Journal of Nautical Archaeology. 37 (1): 32–48. doi:10.1111/j.1095-9270.2007.00172.x. eISSN 1095-9270.
- Peacock, David; Blue, Lucy, eds. (2011). Myos Hormos – Quseir Al-Qadim: Roman and Islamic Ports on the Red Sea: Volume 2: Finds from the Excavations, 1999–2003. British Archaeological Reports International Series. Vol. 2286. Assisted by Whitewright, Julian. Oxford: BAR Publishing. doi:10.30861/9781407308630. ISBN 9781407308630.
- Williams, David F.; Peacock, David, eds. (2011). Bread for the People: The Archaeology of Mills and Milling. British Archaeological Reports International Series. Vol. 2274. Oxford: BAR Publishing. ISBN 9781407308487.

=== As sole author or editor ===
- Peacock, David (1969a). "A Contribution to the Study of Glastonbury Ware from South-Western Britain". The Antiquaries Journal. 49 (1): 41–61. doi:10.1017/S0003581500032558. eISSN 1758-5309.
- — (1969b). "A Petrological Study of Certain Iron Age Pottery from Western England". Proceedings of the Prehistoric Society. 34: 414–427. doi:10.1017/S0079497X00013967. eISSN 2050-2729.
- — (1977a). "Ceramics in Roman and Medieval Archaeology". In Peacock, David (ed.). Pottery and Early Commerce: Characterization and Trade in Roman and Later Ceramics. London, New York and San Francisco: Academic Press. pp. 21–33. ISBN 012547850X.
- —, ed. (1977b). Pottery and Early Commerce: Characterization and Trade in Roman and Later Ceramics. London, New York and San Francisco: Academic Press. ISBN 012547850X.
- — (1980). "The Roman Millstone Trade: A Petrological Sketch". World Archaeology. 12 (1): 43–53. eISSN 0043-8243. JSTOR 124449.
- — (1982). Pottery in the Roman World: An Ethnoarchaeological Approach. Longman Archaeology Series. London and New York: Longman. ISBN 0582491274.
- — (1993). "The site of Myos Homos: A View from Space". Journal of Roman Archaeology. 6: 226–232. eISSN 2331-5709.
- — (1997). La ceramica romana tra archeologia ed etnografia [Roman Ceramics Between Archaeology and Ethnography] (in Italian). Translated by Pucci, Giuseppe. Bari: Edipuglia. ISBN 8872281512.
- — (2000). "The Roman Period (30 BC – AD 395)". In Shaw, Ian (ed.). The Oxford History of Ancient Egypt. Oxford and New York: Oxford University Press. pp. 414–436. ISBN 9780192804587.
- — (2013). The Stone of Life: Querns, Mills and Flour Production in Europe up to c. 500 AD. Southampton Monographs in Archaeology. St Andrews: Highfield Press. ISBN 9780992633608.

== Sources ==
- Evans, Jane; Brown, Duncan; Knight, David (2016). "'Hold Your Beliefs Lightly': Innovation and Best Practice in Prehistoric, Roman and Post-Roman Ceramic Studies in Britain" (PDF). In Sibbesson, Emilie; Jervis, Ben; Coxon, Sarah (eds.). Insight from Innovation: New Light on Archaeological Ceramics. St Andrews: Highfield Press. pp. 253–269. ISBN 9780992633646.
- Fulford, Michael (2016). "David Peacock 1939–2015". In Sibbesson, Emilie; Jervis, Ben; Coxon, Sarah (eds.). Insight from Innovation: New Light on Archaeological Ceramics. St Andrews: Highfield Press. pp. xx–xxix. ISBN 9780992633646.
- Hodges, Richard (2023-11-22). "In Praise of Tating Ware (And High-Definition Archaeology)". The Past.
- Hurst, Henry (1975). "Excavations at Carthage 1974: First Interim Report". The Antiquaries Journal. 55 (1): 11–40. doi:10.1017/S0003581500035460. eISSN 1758-5309.
- Hurst, Henry (1976). "Excavations at Carthage 1975: Second Interim Report". The Antiquaries Journal. 56 (2): 177–197. doi:10.1017/S0003581500064672. eISSN 1758-5309.
- Keay, Simon (2015). "Obituary: David Peacock (January 14, 1939 – March 15, 2015)". Journal of Roman Archaeology. 28: 965–967. doi:10.1017/S1047759415003438. eISSN 2331-5709.
- Montana, Giuseppe; Fabbri, Bruno; Santoro, Sara; Gualtieri, Sabrina; Iliopoulos, Ioannis; Guiducci, Gabriella; Mini, S. (2007). "Pantellerian Ware: A Comprehensive Archaeometric Review". Antiquity. 49 (3): 455–481. doi:10.1111/j.1475-4754.2007.00314.x. eISSN 1745-1744 – via Academia.edu.
- "Monument Number 348006". Historic England. Archived from the original on 2021-12-04.
- Nicholson, Paul; Patterson, Helen (1985). "Pottery Making in Upper Egypt: An Ethnoarchaeological Study". World Archaeology. 17 (2): 222–239. eISSN 1470-1375. JSTOR 124512.
- "Professor David Peacock". The Times. 17 June 2015.
- Quinn, Patrick Sean (2013). Ceramic Petrography: The Interpretation of Archaeological Pottery and Related Artefacts in Thin Section. Oxford: Archaeopress. ISBN 9781789699425.
- Reece, Richard (1983). "Roman Pottery". The Classical Review. 33 (2): 296–298. doi:10.1017/S0009840X00112065. ISSN 1464-3561.
- Reisz, Matthew (2015-04-23). "David Peacock, 1939–2015". Times Higher Education.
- Sibbesson, Emilie; Jervis, Ben; Coxon, Sarah, eds. (2016). Insight from Innovation: New Light on Archaeological Ceramics. St Andrews: Highfield Press. ISBN 9780992633646.
- Thomas, Nicholas; Thomas, Charles (1955). "Excavations at Snail Down, Everleigh: 1953, 1955. An Interim Report". Wiltshire Archaeological Magazine. 56 (203): 127–148. ISSN 0309-3476.
- Tomber, Roberta; Dore, John Nigel (2017) [1998]. "The National Roman Fabric Reference Collection: A Handbook" (Online ed.).
- Tomber, Roberta (2018). "David Philip Spencer Peacock (1939–2015)" (PDF). Journal of Roman Pottery Studies. 17: xii–xiv. ISSN 0958-3491. Archived from the original (PDF) on 2021-11-29.
- Wickham, Chris (2013). The Donkey and the Boat: Reinterpreting the Mediterranean Economy, 950–1180. Oxford: Oxford University Press. ISBN 9780192598493.
