= Kenyon Medal =

Award of the British Academy

The Kenyon Medal is awarded annually by the British Academy 'in recognition of work in the field of classical studies and archaeology'. The medal was endowed by Sir Frederic Kenyon and was first awarded in 1957.

== List of recipients ==
Source: British Academy

- 1957 – John Beazley
- 1959 – Michael Ventris (posthumously)
- 1961 – Edgar Lobel
- 1963 – Carl Blegen
- 1965 – Eduard Fraenkel
- 1967 – Maurice Bowra
- 1969 – Denys Page
- 1971 – E. R. Dodds
- 1973 – A. S. F. Gow
- 1975 – Ronald Syme
- 1977 – Rudolf Pfeiffer
- 1979 – Bernard Ashmole
- 1981 – Arnaldo Momigliano
- 1983 – Arthur Dale Trendall
- 1985 – D. R. Shackleton Bailey
- 1987 – Martin Robertson
- 1989 – F. W. Walbank
- 1991 – Homer Thompson
- 1993 – Kenneth Dover
- 1995 – John Boardman
- 1997 – Robin G. M. Nisbet
- 1999 – Brian B. Shefton
- 2001 – no award
- 2002 – Martin Litchfield West
- 2003 – Nicolas Coldstream
- 2005 – Fergus Millar
- 2007 – Geoffrey Lloyd
- 2009 – James Noel Adams
- 2011 – David Peacock
- 2013 – Alan Cameron
- 2015 – Nigel Guy Wilson
- 2017 – Joyce Reynolds
- 2019 - Peter Parsons
- 2020 - Averil Cameron
- 2021 - David Breeze
- 2022 - T. P. Wiseman
- 2023 - Susan Walker
- 2024 - Christopher Stray
- 2025 - Michael Fulford

== See also ==
- Awards of the British Academy
- List of archaeology awards
- List of history awards
- List of awards named after people
