= Oceans (TV series) =

- Title sequence to Oceans
- Genre: Documentary
- Starring: Paul Rose; Tooni Mahto; Lucy Blue; Philippe Cousteau
- Narrated by: Mark Halliley
- Composer: Ty Unwin
- Country of origin: United Kingdom
- Original language: English
- No. of series: 1
- No. of episodes: 8

Production
- Production locations: Indian Ocean, Sea of Cortez, Atlantic Ocean, Red Sea, Southern Ocean, Mediterranean Sea, Arctic Ocean
- Running time: 60 mins
- Production company: BBC

Original release
- Network: BBC Two
- Release: 12 November – 19 December 2008

Oceans is an eight-part documentary series on BBC Two, which seeks to provide a better understanding of the state of the Earth's oceans today, their role in the past, present and future and their significance in global terms. Paul Rose also documents some of the scientific observations his team made as a feature for BBC News.

== Species Featured ==
Some of the species features in the series include: Sperm whale, Humboldt squid, Sea lion, Scallop, Hammerhead shark, Kelp, Weedy sea dragon, Maori octopus, Fur seal, Rock lobster, Lionfish, Coconut crab, Seahorses, Whale shark, Dugong, Six gill shark, Great white shark, Tuna, Walrus and Beluga whale.

== Episodes/Locations ==
There are eight episodes in the series.

- 1: Sea of Cortez - First broadcast 12 November 2008

The marine experts carry out pioneering science on the 20-metre-long sperm whale.

- 2: Southern Ocean - First broadcast 19 November 2008

Why are parts of the Southern Ocean warming twice as fast as the rest of Earth's oceans?

- 3: Red Sea - First broadcast 26 November 2008

The team explores the remote and unexplored Southern Red Sea.

- 4: Atlantic Ocean - First broadcast 27 November 2008

The team explores a corner of the Atlantic Ocean.

- 5: Indian Ocean - First broadcast 3 December 2008

The team explores the tropics of the Indian Ocean and search for the elusive dugong.

- 6: Indian Ocean - Coastal waters - First broadcast 4 December 2008

The team explores the coastal waters of the Indian Ocean.

- 7: Mediterranean Sea - First broadcast 10 December 2008

An exploration of the profound effect that man is having on the Mediterranean Sea.

- 8: Arctic Ocean - First broadcast 19 December 2008

The team dive beneath the polar ice cap to explore how the ice is shrinking.

== Crew ==
- Paul Rose - Polar explorer, expedition leader
- Tooni Mahto - Marine biologist, oceanographer
- Lucy Blue - Marine archaeologist
- Philippe Cousteau - Environmentalist, oceanographer

== Related links ==
- Oceans at IMDb
- Oceans at BBC Online
