= Lucy Blue =

Lucy Blue may refer to:

- Lucy Blue (archaeologist), British maritime archaeologist and university lecturer
- Lucy Blue (musician) (born 2002), Irish singer, songwriter, and producer

== See also ==
- Lucie Blue Tremblay (born 1958), Canadian folk singer-songwriter
