= Deir el-Atrash =

Roman-era fort in eastern Egypt

- دير الأطرش (Arabic)
- Location within Egypt
- 26°56′06.0″N 33°04′59.0″E
- Type: fort
- Periods: Roman and Byzantine
- Location: Eastern Desert, Egypt
- Region: Red Sea Governorate

Site notes
- Excavation dates: 2020
- Archaeologists: French Archaeological Mission to the Egyptian Eastern Desert (MAFDO)
- Condition: In ruins

Deir el-Atrash is an archaeological site featuring the remains of a Roman fortlet (praesidium) in Egypt's Eastern Desert. Positioned along the route to Mons Porphyrites, the fort was responsible for securing and supporting caravans transporting goods to and from the porphyry quarries.

The fort was garrisoned during two primary periods of occupation: first from the late 1st to early 2nd century AD, and again nearly three centuries later, from the late 4th to early 5th centuries AD. In 2020, excavations uncovered a series of well-preserved polychrome wall paintings at the fort's entrance.

== Location ==
The fort stands on a natural terrace within Egypt's Eastern Desert, positioned in the dry riverbed of Wadi el-Atrash. It lies along the ancient route linking Kaine (modern Qena, on the Nile) to Mons Porphyrites (Gebel Dokhan), an area that housed porphyry quarries during Roman times. In the 4th century, this road was extended to the Red Sea, leading to a Roman fort now identified as 'Abu Sha'ar.

== Structure ==
The praesidium of Deir el-Atrash follows a standardized layout typical of Roman desert forts. Built primarily from rough blocks of dark graywacke quarried from the surrounding mountains, the fort encloses an irregular square, each side measuring 55 meters. Its entrance was situated on the southern side, flanked by two mudbrick towers, with a dump discovered nearby.

The fort's interior is well-preserved, with rooms and structures lining all four sides around the central depression. At the fort's center lies a 20-meter-wide, 5-meter-deep pit with an integrated well, which provided water for both the garrison and passing caravans. Other towers were positioned at the corners of the fort, one of which, built from stone, still stands at 3.5 meters in height.

To the east, an annex measuring 56 by 42 meters, with animal tethering lines, was likely designed to house animals used in caravans and for transport along the adjacent road. To the west, outside the fort's walls, lies a 30-meter-long water channel.

== Occupation ==
The occupation history of Deir el-Atrash consists of two distinct phases of military presence, separated by a prolonged period of abandonment. The first phase, dating to the late 1st–early 2nd century AD, is confirmed through ceramic analysis and the discovery of scale and mail armor characteristic of this period. The second phase, occurring in the late 4th–early 5th century AD, is evidenced by ceramic remains from that time. Since porphyry production in the region had ceased by this stage, the fort may have transitioned into a support facility for garrisons along the Red Sea coast and a defensive outpost against nomads. Additionally, though unproven, it has been suggested that the site may have been reoccupied later in Byzantine times, possibly serving a military supply function until the 7th century.

== Wall paintings ==
In 2020, during excavations at the site, archaeologists uncovered well-preserved wall paintings dating back to the last 1st to early 2nd century AD. The discovery is unique among military structures along the frontiers of the Roman Empire (limes), where exterior walls typically featured only whitewash or simple red markings. The painting spans approximately 2.4 meters across one of the entrance towers and the adjoining curtain wall, presenting figurative scenes.

=== Primary phase ===
The primary phase features a detailed polychrome composition. There, the most prominent scene is divided into two registers by a bold red band. The upper register features a prominent image of a horse and a rider, depicted in three-quarter view. The horse, shown prancing, has a buckskin coat, while the rider wears a checkered cloak fastened by a round fibula. Above the rider, a dark green snake is depicted moving across the scene. A Greek inscription appears near the rider, possibly attributing the artwork to a person named Valerius.

Another part of the primary phase shows a caravan of dromedaries. At least four of them, painted in brown with black outline, are painted in great detail, including eyelashes, hair and saddles. A man in a yellow tunic and brown clavi leads the procession, while looking back at an agitated camel. Below this scene, a vine trellis extends across the lower register, with red and green grape leaves interwoven in its structure.

=== Secondary phase ===
In a secondary phase, predating the Late Roman reconstruction of the fort's entrance, additional motifs were added to the remaining empty spaces. These include a horse with a thick mane and elongated body, as well as two dromedaries linked by a rope above the existing caravan. Unlike the detailed polychrome artwork of the earlier phase, these figures were sketched in charcoal and are significantly less preserved. Also surviving, alongside various indistinct graffiti and markings, are a horned altar and possibly another camel.

=== Scholarly analysis ===
According to Marchand, Le Bomin and Bülow-Jacobsen, the paintings hint at symbolic meanings tied to the diverse composition of the Roman army. Given the documented presence of Thracian and Dacian auxiliary troops in Egypt's Eastern Desert, this imagery perhaps reflects their cultural and religious traditions within the Roman military context.

The horseman depicted alongside a snake may represent a draconarius, a horsed standard-bearer carrying the draco military emblem, possibly inspired by Parthian or Sarmatian traditions. Another interpretation links the rider to the heros equitans or the Thracian Horseman, a protective deity particularly revered in Thrace, who is often depicted alongside a snake. This figure, often referred to as Heron in dedications, was worshipped in Egypt, particularly in the Faiyum region. The vine motif in the lower register may symbolize Lycurgus, the Thracian king ensnared in vines in myth and locally known as Heron's acolyte, though it could also simply reference the supply of wine.

== See also ==
- Didymoi
- Mons Porphyrites
- Mons Claudianus
