= Valerie Maxfield =

Professor of archaeology

Valerie A. Maxfield

Academic background
- Education: University of Leicester; Durham University
- Thesis: The Dona Militaria of the Roman Army (1972)
- Doctoral advisor: Brian Dobson

Academic work
- Discipline: Archaeology
- Sub-discipline: Roman archaeology
- Institutions: University of Exeter

Valerie Maxfield FSA is a Roman archaeologist and emeritus Professor of Archaeology at the University of Exeter. She is a specialist in the archaeology of the Roman army and frontiers, and edited the Proceedings of the Devon Archaeological Society until December 2020.

== Academic career ==
Maxfield completed an undergraduate degree in History at the University of Leicester and completed a Phd at Durham University in 1972, at Trevelyan College, supervised by Brian Dobson. She studied at the British School at Rome, and was then appointed as a Lecturer in Archaeology at the University of Exeter. Maxfield retired from the university in 2008, coinciding with Bryony Coles' retirement. To mark their departure, the archaeology department held a conference dedicated to them titled 'From Desert to Wetland'. Valerie Maxfield is currently an emeritus Professor of Archaeology at the University of Exeter.

== Excavations ==
In 1972 Maxfield excavated the Roman temporary camp at Eskbank, revealing its entrance complex, and in 1975 a series of pits at the camp. She excavated the Roman fort of Camelon, Falkirk from 1975–1977, and discovered a new camp at Lochlands through excavations in 1980–1984. Maxfield has worked in the Eastern Desert of Egypt since 1987 and excavated at Mons Porphyrites with David Peacock in the 1990s. This led to a grant of £5,595 from the British Academy in 2005 to fund post-excavation work on the project.

== Archaeological societies ==
Maxfield co-founded the Hadrianic Society in 1971 with David Breeze and Brian Dobson and was elected as a Fellow of the Society of Antiquaries in 1978. Maxfield is a member of the Durham School of Archaeology. She has a longstanding involvement with both the Devon Archaeological Society and the Cornwall Archaeological Society, whose president she was in 2014. She is the current vice-president of the Devon Archaeological Society and edits the society's journal.

== Selected publications ==
- V. Maxfield 1972. Excavations at Eskbank Midlothian, 1972. Proceedings of the Society of Antiquaries of Scotland. 141-150.
- V.A. Maxfield. 1981. The Military Decorations of the Roman Army. London: Batsford.
- V.A. Maxfield. 1986. Pre-Flavian Forts and their Garrisons. Britannia 17: 59-72.
- V. Maxfield. 1989. The Saxon Shore: A Handbook. Exeter: Exeter University Press.
- Dobson, B. and Maxfield, V. 1995. Some Inscriptions of Roman Britain. London: London Association of Classical Teachers
- V.A. Maxfield, D. Peacock. 2001. The Roman Imperial Quarries: Survey and Excavation at Mons Porphyrites 1994-1998 Volume 2. London: Egypt Exploration Society.
- V.A. Maxfield. 2001. Stone quarrying in the Eastern Desert with particular reference to Mons Claudianus and Mons Porphyrites. In D. Mattingly and J. Salmon. Economies beyond Agriculture in the Classical World.
- V.A. Maxfield and D. Peacock. 2001. Survey and Excavation. Mons Claudianus 1987-1993 II: Excavations part 1. Cairo: Institute francais d'archeologie orientale
- V.A. Maxfield and M.J. Dobson (eds). 2003. Roman Frontier Studies. Liverpool: Liverpool University Press.
- V.A. Maxfield. 2003. Ostraca and the Roman army in the Eastern desert. Bulletin of the Institute of Classical Studies 46: 153-173.
