= Mons Claudianus =

Roman quarry in the eastern desert of Egypt

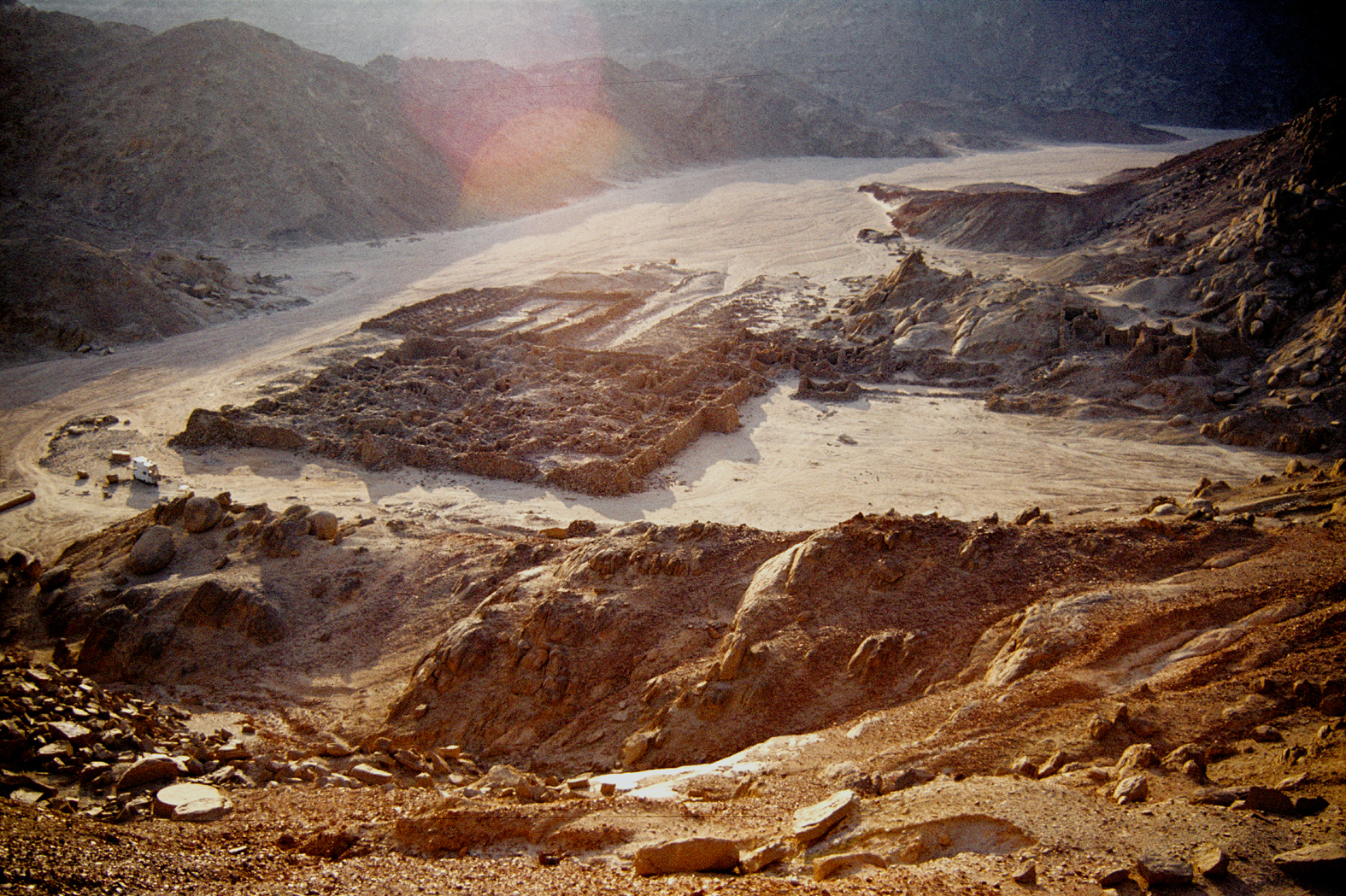
- View of Mons Claudianus from the northeast

- Location within Egypt
- 26°48′33″N 33°29′13″E
- Type: Quarry
- Periods: Roman Empire
- Location: Safaga, Red Sea Governorate, Egypt
- Region: Upper Egypt

History
- Built: 1st century AD
- Abandoned: Middle of the 3rd century AD

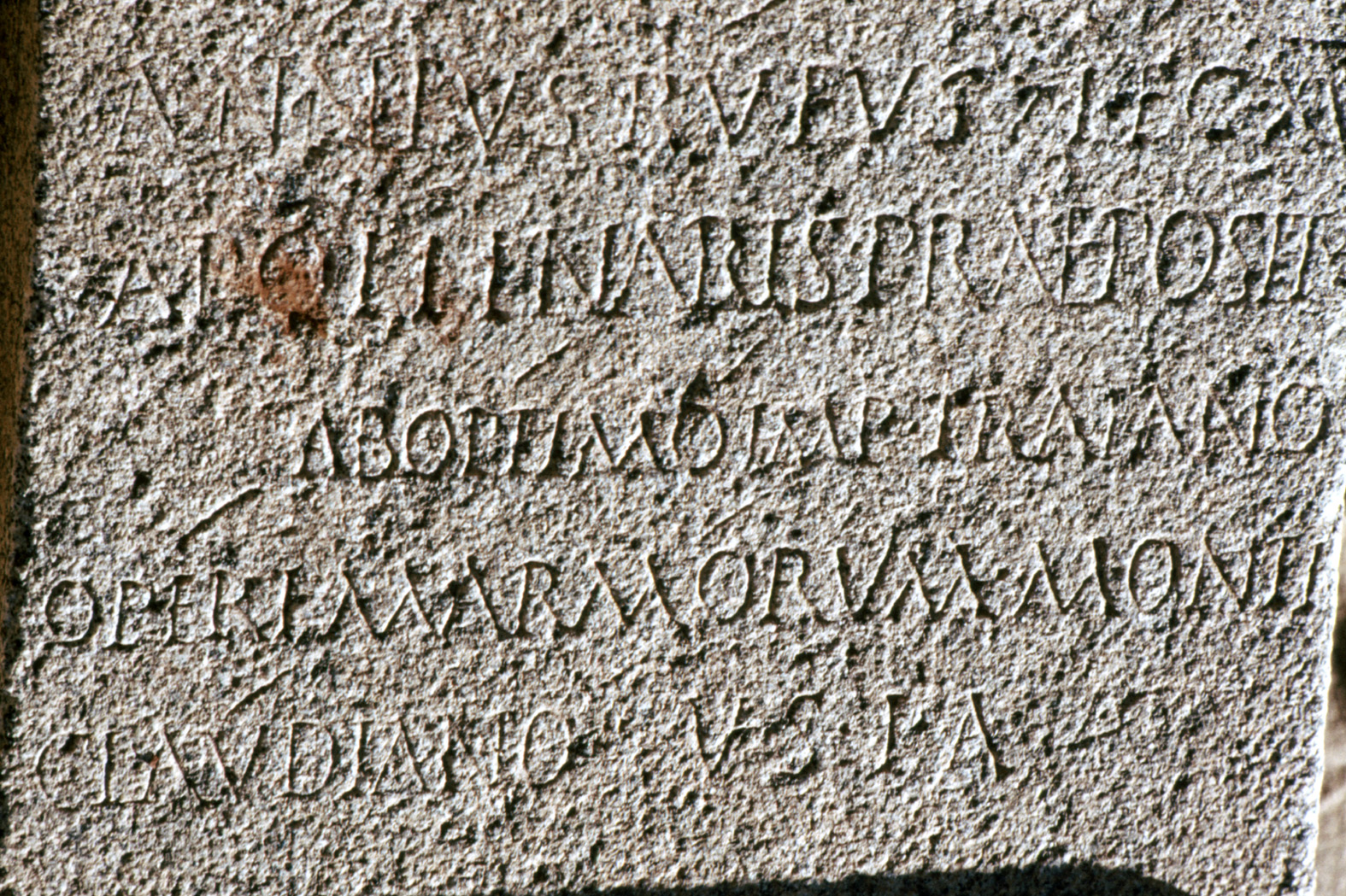
Roman inscription “Marmorum Monti Claudiano” and it translates: "Annius Rufus, a centurion of the 15th legion, a paepositus of Apollinaris, fulfilled with a willing heart the vow made by the excellent emperor Trajan to work on the marbles at Mont Claudian."

Mons Claudianus was a Roman quarry in the eastern desert of Egypt. It consisted of a garrison, a quarrying site, and civilian and workers' quarters. Granodiorite was mined for the Roman Empire where it was used as a building material. Mons Claudianus is located in the mountains of the Egyptian Eastern desert about midway between the Red Sea and Qena, in the present day Red Sea Governorate. Today tourists can see fragments of granite, with several artifacts such as a broken column. A number of texts written on broken pottery (ostraca) have been discovered at the site.

== Discovery and location ==
Mons Claudianus lies in the Eastern desert of upper Egypt, and was discovered in 1823 by Wilkinson and Burton. It lies north of Luxor, between the Egyptian town of Qena on the Nile and Hurghada on the Red Sea, 500 km south of Cairo and 120 km east of the Nile, at an altitude of c. 700 m in the heart of the Red Sea Mountains. About 50 km away is another imperial stone quarry known as Mons Porphyrites, which is the world's only known source of purple porphyry.

== Time line ==
The excavation of Mons Claudianus by the Romans occurred through two centuries, from the 1st century AD to the mid-3rd century AD. There is no evidence of settlements near or at the quarry prior to the Roman settlement. The arid conditions of the desert allowed the documents and organic remains to survive.

== Harvesting and use of resources ==
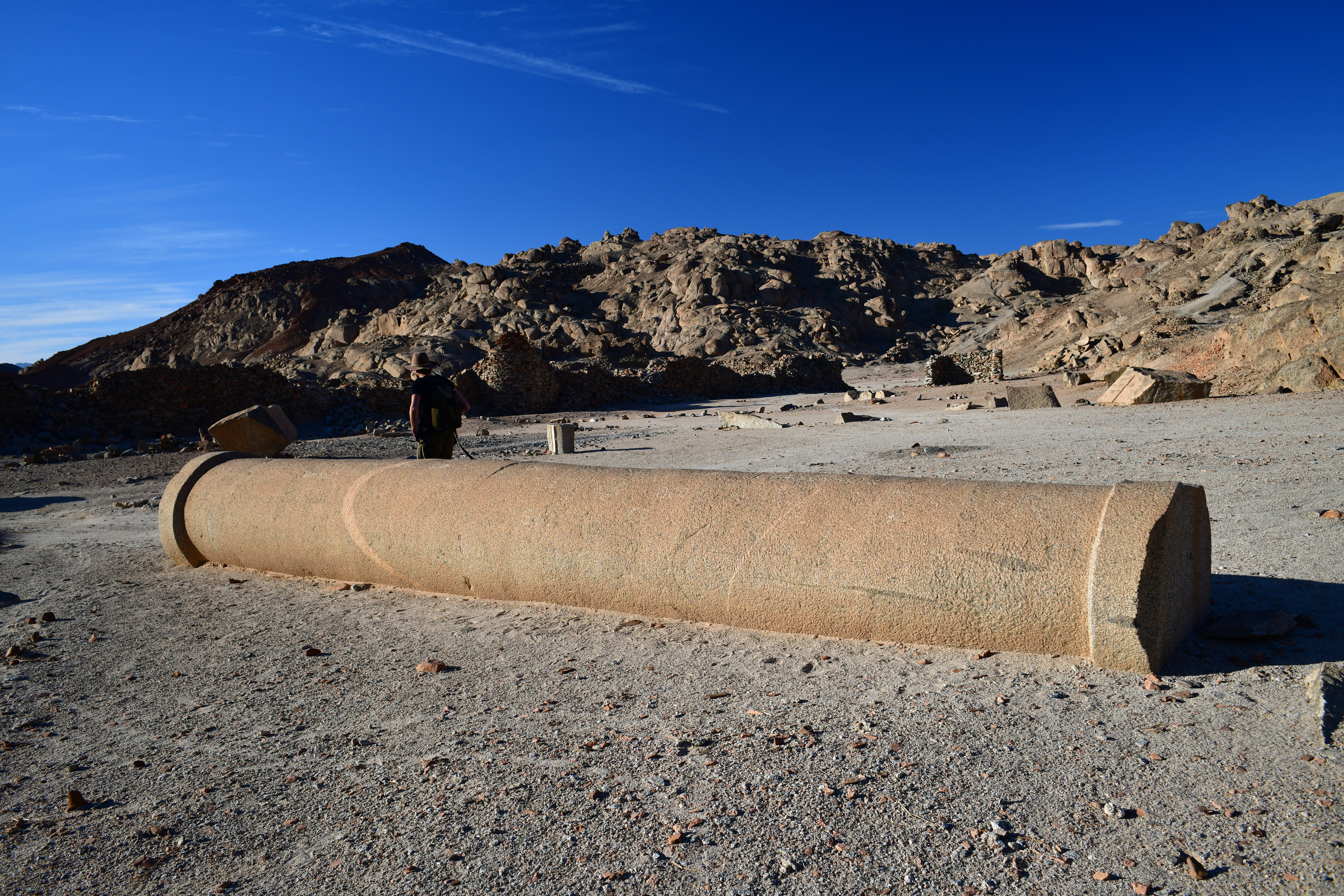
Monolithic column in the sand, pre-shaped with bands or turning rings on either end.

Mons Claudianus was an abundant source of Granodiorite for Rome, and was used in notable Roman structures including Emperor Hadrian's villa at Tivoli, public baths, the floors and columns of the temple of Venus, Diocletian's Palace at Split and the columns of the portico of the Pantheon in Rome were quarried at Mons Claudianus. Each was 39 feet (12 m) tall, five feet (1.5 m) in diameter, and 60 tons in weight.

== Access routes and transport ==
Mons Claudianus was linked to the river Nile by a traceable surviving Roman road marked by way-stations spaced out at one day intervals. The stones from the quarries, which were shaped in the desert, were then taken along the road to the Nile Valley for trans-shipment to Rome. Documents that were found on site referred to 12-wheeled and 4-wheeled carts, and include a request for delivery of new axles. The journey would last approximately five days or longer. The way-stations, which resembled small defended 'forts', with many rooms accompanied by stabling and a water-supply, served as motels where the men and animals moving the stones could rest, eat and drink. Donkeys may have been used to transport food and water needed by men between way-stations as well as to pull the wagons; however, for larger loads it seems that both human and animal labour was used. Camels were used for communication and for the transport of food and water.

The columns may have also been dragged more than 100 km from the quarry to the river on wooden sledges, though the terrain from quarry to the Nile is such that the route was downhill the entire length. They were floated by barge down the Nile River when the water level was high during the spring floods, and then transferred to vessels to cross the Mediterranean Sea to the Roman port of Ostia. There, they were transferred back onto barges and pulled up the Tiber River to Rome.

== Life in Mons Claudianus ==
The quarry was administered by the Roman army. The quarry men of Mons Claudianus were a skilled and well-paid civilian workforce, and their lifestyle at the quarry could even be described as luxurious. The Ostraca refer to four groups of people: soldiers and officials; skilled, civilian workers; unskilled workers; and women and children. According to the Ostraca (earthen pots with inscriptions on them) many of the workers at Mons Claudianus earned around 47 drachmas a month -which was about twice as much as their counterparts in the Nile Valley as well as one 'artab' which was approximately 47 pints of wheat. Evidence has been found of 55 different food plants and 20 sources of animal proteins, with donkey being the meat most commonly eaten, probably due to the number of donkeys that existed. Fish from the Red Sea, luxuries like artichoke and citron as well as pepper from India and game animals, snails and oysters were some of the foods available. Findings of seeds of cabbage, leaf beet, lettuce, mint, basil and a few others, which would not have been present if the vegetables were delivered to eat, suggest that, food was both delivered and grown at Mons Claudianus, to maintain the health of the workers with proper iron and vitamin C intake. Germinated, carbonised barley grains have also been found, suggesting that the inhabitants brewed beer. Imported chaff, straw, barley grain, charcoal and midden material were used for animal fodder, as temper for the making of wall plaster and mud-brick, and for fuel for the ovens and fires. At the Quarries, several columns, some basins and a bath can still be found lying broken; the largest column is 60 ft high and weighs some 200 tonnes. Many buildings still survive intact to roof height. The settlement resembled a fort with walls and projecting towers, and housed an estimated 1,000 people, both quarrymen and guards. The stones from the quarries were shaped in the desert, possibly to reduce their weight, then taken to the Nile Valley to be shipped to Rome.

== Sources ==
- Peacock, D.P.S. and Maxfield, V.A. (1997) Mons Claudianus: Survey and Excavation. ISBN 2-7247-0192-5
- Mons Claudianus. Ostraca graeca et latina.
  - Vol. I, ed. J. Bingen, A. Bülow-Jacobsen, W.E.H. Cockle, H. Cuvigny, L. Rubinstein and W. Van Rengen. Cairo 1992. (Institut Français d’Archéologie Orientale, Documents de Fouilles 29). Nos. 1—190.
  - Vol. II, ed. J. Bingen, A. Bülow-Jacobsen, W.E.H. Cockle, H. Cuvigny, F. Kayser and W. Van Rengen. Cairo 1997. (Institut Français d’Archéologie Orientale, Documents de Fouilles 32). Nos. 191—416.
  - Vol. III, Les reçus pour avances à la ‘familia,’ ed. H. Cuvigny. Cairo 2000. (Institut Français d’Archéologie Orientale, Documents de Fouilles 38). Nos. 417-631.
- Herz, Norman. Waelkens, Marc. Classical marble:geochemistry, technology, trade. Kluwer Academic Publishers, p. 97.
- Myers, Elaine Anne. The Ituraeans and the Roman Near East:reassessing the sources. Cambridge University Press, p. 127.
- Van der Veen, Marijke. High living in Rome's distant quarries British Archaeology, 28.
- Van der Veen, Marijke. A life of luxury in the desert? The food and fodder supply to Mons Claudianus Journal of Roman Archaeology, 2(101-116).
- Wilson-Jones, Mark (2003). Principles of Roman Architecture. New Haven: Yale University Press. ISBN 9780300102024
