= Florence Nankivell =

(1901–1993) Dutch-born welfare advocate

Florence Nankivell (8 June 1901 – 1993, born as Florence Muysken) was a welfare advocate best known for raising awareness of conditions under British colonialism in the West Indies and for organising a Kindertransport to rescue Jewish children from pre-war Berlin. She later became active in the field of archaeology.

== Early life ==
Nankivell was born in 1901 in Amsterdam to parents Joan Muysken and Elizabeth van Duers. She studied social work in the UK and later worked to support young female migrants whose employment was precarious. In 1930, she met Noel Howard Nankivell, the British Colonial Secretary in Trinidad. They married in Port of Spain in 1932 and had children, Selma and Edmund. Florence was involved in creating the Tourist Inquiry Bureau and was its honorary secretary in 1933.

== International welfare work ==
Florence Nankivell did social work in Trinidad with the families of people employed on sugar plantations and by oil companies. In the late 1930s, Nankivell offered her diaries as evidence that the terrible conditions were caused by poverty wages to the Moyne Commission, and also spoke out publicly. Nankivell's husband also supported the workers involved in the Butler Riots and condemned colonial business practices: he was removed from his role and posted to Cyprus. Nankivell travelled to England with their two children in June 1938, where they were delayed from going on to Cyprus because one of the children had to quarantine.

In late 1938, Nankivell, who spoke fluent German, worked with a Quaker organisation and travelled to Berlin to organise transportation and help Jewish children, many of whom were orphans, to escape the city. She faced unwanted attention from the police, but on 1 December, a train carrying 196 children departed the city, with the refugees then travelling by boat to reach the UK. This was the first of what became known as Kindertransport.

== UK work ==
Nankivell moved to Oxford with her children in the early 1940s, following the death of her husband. She volunteered for the Admiralty at the Bodleian Library and for the Land Army.

In 1947 Nankivell moved to Polzeath in Cornwall. She helped to develop the Cornwall Archaeological Society in 1961 and was its secretary for 13 years.
