= Richard Hodges (archaeologist) =

British archaeologist

Richard Hodges OBE FSA
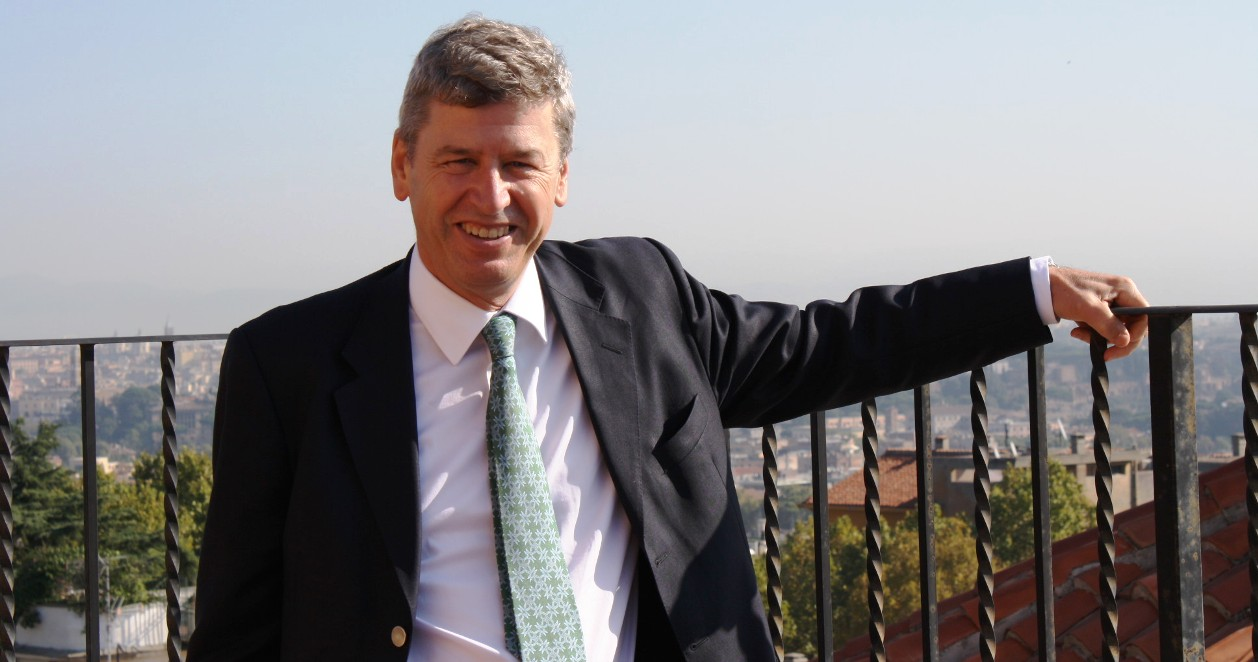
- As President of The American University of Rome (2012)

11th President of The American University of Rome
- Incumbent
- Assumed office 1 July 2012
- Preceded by: Robert Marino; Andrew Thompson (acting)

Personal details
- Born: 29 September 1952 (age 74) Bath, Somerset, England
- Profession: Archaeologist
- Website: Office of the President of The American University of Rome

Academic background
- Education: University of Southampton
- Doctoral advisor: David Peacock

Academic work
- Discipline: Early medieval archaeology

Richard Hodges, OBE, FSA (born 29 September 1952) is a British archaeologist and past president of the American University of Rome. A former professor and director of the Institute of World Archaeology at the University of East Anglia (1996–2007), Hodges is also the former Williams Director of the University of Pennsylvania Museum of Archaeology and Anthropology in Philadelphia (October 2007- 2012). His published research primarily concerns trade and economics during the early part of the Middle Ages in Europe. His earlier works include Dark Age Economics (1982), Mohammed, Charlemagne and the Origins of Europe (1983) and Light in the Dark Ages: The Rise and Fall of San Vincenzo Al Volturno (1997).

== Academic career ==
Hodges's academic career has focussed upon the archaeology of the later Roman world and the early Middle Ages in western Europe. Many of his excavations and publications have highlighted the transformation of classical antiquity and the birth of Europe. Beginning with Dark Age Economics (1982), he reviewed the changing regional patterns of urban phenomena – especially emporia – in the making of north-west Europe. Following this, with David Whitehouse, in Mohammed, Charlemagne and the Origins of Europe (1983), he reappraised Henri Pirenne's celebrated historical thesis about the collapse of antiquity and the rise of Europe in the Carolingian age. Perhaps his most significant contribution to this theme was the 18-year (1980–98) excavations at San Vincenzo al Volturno, an Italian Benedictine monastery of the Carolingian renaissance, where together with the art historian, John Mitchell, the history and culture was unearthed and set within a European context. In the many reports on these excavations the architectural history and the art history, including well preserved cycles of paintings in the crypt of San Vincenzo Maggiore, were situated within the changing social and economic circumstances of 9th-century Italy.

Hodges pursued a similar approach at the UNESCO World Heritage Site of Butrint, the Graeco-Roman town in southern Albania, where over 20 years (1993-2012) representing the Butrint Foundation (Lords Rothschild and Sainsbury), and partnering with the Packard Humanities Institute, he developed a large-scale research programme (with many publications) and a concurrent cultural heritage programme. The project examined all archaeological periods at this site, including the formerly unknown Middle Byzantine periods.

As of 2015–20 Hodges is the principal investigator of a European Research Council project known as nEU-Med (no. 670792) with the University of Siena entitled 'The creation of economic and monetary union (7th to 12th centuries): mining, landscapes and political strategies in a Mediterranean region'. This project involves excavations at Vetricella, a complex 9th- to 11th- century elite site near Scarlino, a study of Portus Scabris on the Tyrrhenian Sea, environmental and archaeological studies of the Pegora valley corridor, and a major analysis of Italian early Medieval silver coinage with a view to identifying silver extracted from the Colline Metallifere.

Throughout his career Hodges has written articles for public audiences. Foremost amongst these are his bi-monthly column for Current World Archaeology, a collection of which has been published as Travels with an Archaeologist (2017).

== Academic management ==
As a lecturer at Sheffield University (1976–88) Hodges created the Roystone Grange Archaeological Trail (1988-87). This teaching exercise, with the Peak District National Park, was intended as an innovative heritage feature in the National Park. A second teaching project focussed upon the Montarrenti project (1982–87), with Siena University and the Province of Siena. This was designed as a programme to make a park using the castle with its Romanesque to Renaissance tower-houses as well as the associated lost village.

As Director of the British School at Rome (1988–95) Hodges was faced with running an institution as government policy on higher education was being radically changed. He oversaw reforms of the institutional structures (charter, committees, staffing, programmes etc.) with a prominent emphasis upon activity-led projects aimed at raising the School's profile and winning support for refurbishing the it building (originally constructed by Sir Edwin Lutyens). Among the initiatives during his administration were the creation of an art gallery and an active archaeological unit. He also oversaw the refurbishment of the School's celebrated neo-classical façade with funds from the British government. During this period Hodges also wrote Visions of Rome (2000), a biography of the School's third director, the archaeologist, Thomas Ashby.

As Director at the Prince of Wales's Institute (1996–98) Hodges was charged with its re-positioning because it was attracting academic and journalistic criticism. He worked with two chairmen to reduce the trustees to a small working group, and then tackled the academic programme with reviews, and concurrently began the process of re-establishing the Institute within the Prince's group of trusts devoted to sustainability and the built environment.

As a professor in the School of World Art Studies, University of East Anglia, Norwich (1995–2007) Hodges set up a research institute, the Institute of World Archaeology (1996-2007). This was conceived as a research constellation with an emphasis upon cultural heritage activity. The main projects were in Albania and involved the making of a sustainable archaeological park at Butrint, as well as creating a post-communist archaeological community in serving a transition economy.

During this period, Hodges was supported by the Open Foundation to be international adviser in Tirana to the Albanian Minister of Culture, Edi Rama. Hodges also advised the Packard Humanities Institute on archaeological and other projects, notably the rescue excavations of the Roman city of Zeugma, Turkey, the conservation of Herculaneum, and the research and conservation of Chersonesos in the Crimea (Ukraine).

As Williams Director of the University of Pennsylvania Museum of Archaeology and Anthropology (2007–12) Hodges, at the request of the university's Provost, embarked upon a programme to create a modern museum accessible to Penn students and to K-12 schoolchildren and Philadelphians. Restructuring the museum involved re-positioning the research staff, modernizing the curatorial and exhibition programmes, as well as changing the education, catering, marketing and gallery programmes. This led to a successful campaign to refurbish the Museum's West Wing, to install new teaching facilities, to install new travelling exhibition galleries, and to implement a digital programme to put the museum's international collections online.

As President of the American University of Rome (2012–present) Hodges has established a new mission for the university, promoting it as primarily a 4-year international university in the liberal arts, business administration and international relations. Giving it a new identity of working with international academics, and, in effect, beginning an overhaul of every aspect of the university, the university is on course to become a major accredited American university in the Mediterranean region.

Hodges has also served as a specialist archaeological consultant to the York Archaeological Trust for the Roşia Montană gold mines in Romania (2014), and to the Norwegian power company, Statkraft in the Devoll valley dams, Albania (2016).

== Bibliography ==
=== Books and research monographs ===
- Hodges, Richard (1981). The Hamwih Pottery : the local and imported wares from thirty years' excavations in Southampton and their European Context. Council for British Archaeology Research Reports. London: Council for British Archaeology.
- 1982. Edited (with G. Barker), Archaeology and Italian Society. Oxford: British Archaeological Reports.
- 1982. Dark Age Economics: The Origins of Town and Trade. London/New York: Duckworth / St. Martin's Press (new edition 1989).
- 1983. Edited (with P. Davey), Ceramics and Trade. Sheffield: Department of Archaeology and Prehistory Sheffield University.
- 1983. (with D. Whitehouse), Mohammed, Charlemagne, and the Origins of Europe: The Pirenne Thesis in the Light of Archaeology. London / Ithaca: Duckworth / Cornell (new edition 1989). Revised French edition published as Mahomet, Charlemagne et les Origines de l'Europe. Paris: Pierre Zech, 1996.
- 1985. Edited (with J. Mitchell), San Vincenzo al Volturno: the Archaeology, Art and Territory of an Early Medieval Monastery. Oxford: British Archaeological Reports.
- 1988. Primitive and Peasant Markets. Oxford: Basil Blackwell.
- 1988. Edited (with B. Hobley), The Rebirth of Towns in the West AD 700-1050. London: Council for British Archaeology Research Report.
- 1989. The Anglo-Saxon Achievement: Archaeology and the Beginnings of English Society. London/Ithaca: Duckworth/ Cornell.
- 1991. Wall-to-Wall History: The Story of Roystone Grange. London: Duckworth (Winner of British Archaeological Book of the Year 1992); (republished as Roystone Grange. 6000 years of a Peakland landscape, Stroud, Tempus, 2006)
- 1991. Early Medieval archaeology in Western Europe: its history and development. Bangor: Headstart History.
- 1991. Edited (with K. Smith), Recent Developments in the Archaeology of the Peak District. Sheffield: Department of Archaeology and Prehistory Sheffield University.
- 1993. Edited, San Vincenzo al Volturno 1: the 1980-86 Excavations Part 1. London: The British School at Rome.
- 1995. Edited, San Vincenzo al Volturno 2: the 1980-86 Excavations Part 2. London: The British School at Rome.
- 1995. (with J. Mitchell), La basilica di Giosue a San Vincenzo al Volturno. Montecassino: Edizione CEP. Revised English edition published in 1996 as The Abbey of Abbot Joshua at San Vincenzo al Volturno.
- 1996. Edited (with G. Brogiolo, S. Gelichi, R. Francovich and H. Steuer), Archaeology and History of the Middle Ages. XIII International Congress of Prehistoric and Protohistoric Sciences. Forli.
- 1997. Light in the Dark Ages. The Rise and Fall of San Vincenzo al Volturno. London/ Ithaca: Duckworth / Cornell University Press.
- 1998. Edited (with W. Bowden), The Sixth Century: Production, Distribution and Consumption. The Hague: E. J. Brill (Volume 2 in the European Science Foundation's Transformation of the Roman World project).
- 2000. Towns and Trade in the Age Charlemagne. London: Duckworth.
- 2000. Visions of Rome: Thomas Ashby, Archaeologist. London: The British School at Rome.
- 2003. (with R. Francovich) Villa to Village. The Transformation of the Roman Landscape in Italy. London: Duckworth.
- 2004. (with W. Bowden & K. Lako), Byzantine Butrint: excavations and surveys 1994-99. Oxford: Oxbow Books.
- 2006. Goodbye to the Vikings? Re-reading Early Medieval Archaeology. London: Duckworth.
- 2006. Eternal Butrint. A Unesco World Heritage Site in Albania. London: Periplus. (translated by Diana Ndrenika) Butrinti I Përjetshëm, Tirana: Botimet Toena 2011.
- 2006. Edited (with L.Bejko), New Directions in Albanian Archaeology. Tirana: ICAA.
- 2006. Edited (with K. Bowes and K.Francis), Between text and territory. San Vincenzo 4. London: British School at Rome.
- 2007. Edited (with I.L. Hansen), Roman Butrint: An Assessment. Oxford: Oxbow Books. 2007
- 2008. Shkëlqimi dhe rënia e Butrintit bizantin / The Rise and Fall of Byzantine Butrint. London/Tirana: Butrint Foundation.
- 2011. (with W. Bowden) Butrint 3. Excavations of the Triconch Palace. Oxford: Oxbow Books.
- 2011. (with S. Leppard and J. Mitchell) San Vincenzo 5. San Vincenzo Maggiore and its Workshops. London: British School at Rome.
- 2012. Dark Age Economics: A New Audit. London: Bloomsbury Academic.
- 2012. Edited (with S. Gelichi) From One Sea to Another. Turnhout: Brepols.
- 2013. Edited (with I.L.Hansen and S.Leppard) Butrint 4. The Archaeology and Histories of an Ionian Town. Oxford: Oxbow Books.
- 2015. Edited with S. Gelichi, New Directions in European Medieval Archaeology. Essays for Riccardo Francovich. Turnhout: Brepols.
- 2016. The Archaeology of Mediterranean Placemaking: Butrint and the Global Heritage Industry. London: Bloomsbury Academic.
- 2017. Travels of an Archaeologist: Finding A Sense of Place. London: Bloomsbury Academic.

=== Book reviews ===
Year	Review article	Work(s) reviewed
2017	Hodges, Richard (September 2017). "Picts, pins, stones and bones". Reviews. History Today. 67 (9): 92–93.	Carver, Martin; Justin Garner-Lahire & Cecily Spall. Portmahomack on Tarbat Ness : changing ideologies in north-east Scotland, Sixth to Sixteenth Century AD. Society of Antiquaries of Scotland.
