= James Noel Adams =

Australian classical philologist (1943–2021)

James Noel Adams CBE FBA
- Born: 24 September 1943
- Died: 11 October 2021 (aged 78)

Academic background
- Education: University of Sydney; Brasenose College, Oxford

Academic work
- Discipline: Classical studies
- Sub-discipline: Latin language; philology
- Institutions: Christ's College, Cambridge; University of Manchester; St John's College, Oxford; University of Reading; All Souls College, Oxford

James Noel Adams CBE FBA (24 September 1943 – 11 October 2021) was an Australian specialist in Latin and Romance Philology.

== Life and career ==
Adams attended the North Sydney Boys' High School and the University of Sydney, where he graduated with first class honours and was awarded the University Medal for Latin in the year 1964. From 1967 to 1970 he was a Commonwealth Scholar at Brasenose College, Oxford, where he also completed his doctorate in 1970.

He later held positions at Christ's College, Cambridge (Rouse Research Fellow in Classics 1970–1972); at the University of Manchester (1972–1995, most recently as professor of Latin); at St John's College, Oxford (visiting senior research fellow 1994–1995); and at the University of Reading (Professor of Latin 1995–1997). From 1998 to 2010 he was a senior research fellow and subsequently emeritus fellow at All Souls College, Oxford.

He was elected a Fellow of the British Academy (FBA) in 1992 and was awarded the British Academy's Kenyon Medal for Classical Studies in 2009. He was an honorary Fellow of Brasenose College, Oxford. In 2002 he was elected as an Honorary Fellow of the Australian Academy of the Humanities (Hon FAHA), and in 2007 as a Member of the Academia Europaea (MAE). In 2010 a volume of essays titled Colloquial and Literary Latin was published in his honour. In 1995 he became chairman of the British Academy's project, the Dictionary of Medieval Latin from British Sources, a post he held until his retirement in 2010. The dictionary was completed in 2013, and Fascicule XIV (2011) was dedicated to him. He was appointed Commander of the Order of the British Empire (CBE) in the 2015 Birthday Honours for services to Latin scholarship. Adams died on 11 October 2021, at the age of 78. The British Academy memoir called him 'probably the greatest Latinist of his time, perhaps of any time'.

== Research ==
Adams' publications largely focus on vernacular, non-literary, technical, and regional varieties of the Latin language. His monograph titled The Latin Sexual Vocabulary (1982) became an indispensable standard reference and remained in print for over thirty years. He also published Bilingualism and the Latin Language (2003), The Regional Diversification of Latin (2007) and Social Variation and the Latin Language (2013), a trilogy which explores linguistic variation in Latin. The third volume of this trilogy won the 2013 PROSE award in Language & Linguistics of the Association of American Publishers, Inc. He also studied ancient veterinary medicine and newly uncovered non-literary Latin texts.

== Works ==
- The Text and Language of a Vulgar Latin Chronicle. (Anonymus Valesianus II) (= Bulletin of the Institute of Classical Studies. Supplement 36). University of London, Institute of Classical Studies, London 1976, ISBN 0-900587-33-4.
- The Vulgar Latin of the Letters of Claudius Terentianus (P. Mich. VIII. 467-72) (= Publications of the Faculty of Arts of the University of Manchester. Band 23). Manchester University Press, Manchester 1977, ISBN 0-7190-1289-9.
- The Latin Sexual Vocabulary. Duckworth, London 1982, Johns Hopkins University Press 1990, ISBN 0-7156-1648-X.
- Wackernagel’s Law and the Placement of the Copula esse in Classical Latin (= Proceedings of the Cambridge Philological Society. Supplement 18). Cambridge Philological Society, Cambridge 1994, ISBN 0-906014-17-4.
- Pelagonius and Latin Veterinary Terminology in the Roman Empire (= Studies in ancient medicine. Band 11). Brill, Leiden 1995, ISBN 90-04-10281-7.
- Bilingualism and the Latin Language. Cambridge University Press, Cambridge 2003, ISBN 0-521-81771-4.
- The Regional Diversification of Latin 200 BC – AD 600. Cambridge University Press, Cambridge 2007, ISBN 0-521-88149-8.
- Social Variation and the Latin Language. Cambridge University Press, Cambridge 2013, ISBN 978-0-521-88614-7.
- An Anthology of Informal Latin, 200 BC – AD 900. Cambridge University Press, Cambridge 2016, ISBN 978-1-108-72997-0.
- Early and Late Latin. Continuity or Change? (co-edited with Nigel Vincent). Cambridge University Press, Cambridge 2016, ISBN 978-1-107-13225-2.
- Asyndeton and its Interpretation in Latin Literature. Cambridge University Press, Cambridge 2021, ISBN 978-1-108-83785-9.
