= Didymoi =

Roman-era fort in eastern Egypt

Coordinates: 25°45′16″N 33°23′40″E

Didymoi (Greek: Δίδυμοι, 'twins') was a Roman fortlet (praesidium) in Egypt that lay along the road from Koptos to Berenike in the Eastern Desert. It corresponds to the site of Khasm al-Minayh in modern Egypt. It was named after its twin protector gods, Castor and Pollux.

The fortlet was founded by Lucius Julius Ursus in the ninth year of the Emperor Vespasian, corresponding to AD 76–77. It was built around a well. Construction was overseen by Trebonius Valens, prefect of Berenike. The garrison consisted of a few dozen cavalry and infantry charged with securing the highway. It was commanded by a curator responsible to the prefect of Berenike. In the late first century, Didymoi was garrisoned by Thracian cavalry. In the early third century, there were Palmyrene soldiers, including archers, stationed there. The fortlet remained occupied until the middle of the fourth century.

Archaeologists have found and published over 400 texts from Didymoi, the majority on ostraca, but also inscribed objects, epigraphy, graffiti and papyri. The texts are mostly in Greek, but also in Latin. Four Palmyrene soldiers left a bilingual inscription in Greek and Palmyrene Aramaic. There is a collection of nine published Latin ostraca from the hand of a certain Thracian soldier named Cutus, which may contain traces of the Thracian language.

== See also ==
- Deir el-Atrash

== Bibliography ==
- Adams, James N.; Ast, Rodney (2021). "The Latin of the Thracian Soldier Cutus". Zeitschrift für Papyrologie und Epigraphik. 218: 243–264.
- Cuvigny, Hélène, ed. (2012). Didymoi: Une garnison romaine dans le désert Oriental d'Égypte. Praesidia du désert de Bérénice, IV. Vol. II: Les textes. Institut français d'archéologie orientale.
- Cuvigny, Hélène (2021). Rome in Egypt's Eastern Desert. Vol. I. New York University Press.
- Dickey, Eleanor (2012). "Review of Cuvigny 2012". Bryn Mawr Classical Review.
- Lougovaya, Julia (2021). "Greek Literary Ostraca Revisited". In Clementina Caputo; Julia Lougovaya (eds.). Using Ostraca in the Ancient World: New Discoveries and Methodologies. De Gruyter.
- Schörle, Katia (2024). "The Palmyrene Diaspora". In Rubina Raja (ed.). The Oxford Handbook of Palmyra. Oxford University Press. pp. 251–260.
- Scott, Christina W. M. (2011). "A Long Walk in the Desert: A Study of the Roman Hydreumata along the Trade Routes between the Red Sea and the Nile". Journal of Ancient Egyptian Interconnections. 3 (4): 16–27. doi:10.2458/azu_jaei_v03i4_scott. ISSN 1944-2815.
- Stauner, Konrad (2016). "New Documents from the Roman Military Administration in Egypt's Eastern Desert: The Ostraca from the Praesidium of Didymoi". In Takmer, B.; Akdoğu Arca, E. N.; Gökalb Özdil, N. (eds.). Vir doctus Anatolics: Studies in Memory of Sencer Şahin. Istanbul. pp. 796–815.
