= Report of West India Royal Commission (Moyne Report) =

Report on conditions in Caribbean colonies

The Report of West India Royal Commission, also known as The Moyne Report, was published fully in 1945 and exposed the poor living conditions in Britain's Caribbean colonies. Following the British West Indian labour unrest of 1934–1939, the Imperial Government sent a royal commission to investigate and report on the situation, while also offering possible solutions. Sahadeo Basdeo points to the commission's investigation in the West Indies as a turning point in colonial attitudes. The uprisings were not seen as unprovoked violence, as they had so often been framed in the past, but as a justified opposition to a pathetic existence. Members of the commission asserted that the resistance that disrupted the Caribbean was not a spontaneous uprising with lofty cause but rather a demand from the labouring class for better and less restrictive lives.

The Moyne Report revealed that for the "labouring population, mere subsistence was increasingly problematic". The conditions were the result of institutional barriers that sought to maintain the colonial power structure.

== Background ==
Historian O. Nigel Bolland places a considerable emphasis on the stagnant economy in the British West Indies from the 1830s to the 1930s. To him, the economic foundations of slavery had remained unchanged for nearly 100 years. The majority of land holdings remained in control of a small planter class minority while coercion remained the dominant form of social control. A similar conclusion is reached by Jay R. Mandle. In looking solely at the Jamaican economy, the most developed in the British West Indies by 1930, Mandle shows that plantation economics still dominated to the point that per capita output was only slightly higher than when slavery was still the dominant means of labour in the early 19th century.

During the century since emancipation, the colonial government made minimal provisions that sought to limit agitation from labourers while taking greater measures to protect British interests and the plantation system. Previous commissions that evaluated the West Indies, such as the 1897 Commission chaired by Sir Henry Norman, recommended diversification and a shift away from plantation economics, but the recommendations went unheeded. Prior commissions to Norman's would place emphasises not on the workers' welfare or the colonies' economic well-being but rather strategies for maintaining a dependant labour force. For those reasons, social and health conditions remained relatively inert since emancipation.

For land owners to continue to make large profit margins, they required large quantities of property and large numbers of low-wage workers. Following the period of apprenticeship, which ended in 1838, the planters faced an economic crisis that challenged the current agriculture system; it was solved by the onset of indentured servants who arrived mainly from India.

Viable alternatives to plantation work would have placed the plantation economy in jeopardy; as a consequence, the brief moments of attempted diversification were squashed before they could even begin. In Trinidad, for example, the planter class attempted to take measures against the general population, which was growing rice and gaining in self-sufficiency. Not only there was resistance from local elites but also rice growers had to contend with crop damage due to pollution from the nearby oil fields Cultivation of agriculture alternatives was undertaken entirely by the poor peasant class on the small plots of land they had acquired.

With the institutional limiting of technological and economic growth and the hampering of attempts at indigenous entrepreneurship, the region and its people were denied any opportunity to develop social institutions that would meet their fundamental needs.

== Economic and social conditions ==
The Great Depression made conditions in the West Indies much worse by a drastic decrease in exports and a sharp decline in the global price of sugar. Some agricultural industries suffered further damage from endemics of plant disease and poor weather. Substandard wages were cut further following the collapse on Wall Street, and underemployment and unemployment were the norm. Adding further strain to an already fragile society, those working internationally in the United States, Cuba, Panama and Costa Rica were repatriated. Many of those workers brought with them ideas about labour organisation, standards of living and a class consciousness that would, in turn, fuel the revolts and calls for reform in the 1930s. The ideas had been growing steadily since the 1880s even if social welfare and the economy remained idle.

Whatever employment then existed in the West Indies was intermittent and underpaid. Coupled with the horrendous working and living conditions the labour riots that began in 1934, starting with Belize lumber workers and spreading through almost every British colony in the region by 1939. That marked the breaking point of the current colonial system in the region. The inability of most households to meet the most basic of financial needs ensured that malnutrition and substandard living conditions created unbearable conditions. Florence Nankivell, the wife of the former Trinidad Colonial Secretary, acknowledged that the dire living conditions were the result of extremely low wages and offered her journals, which detailed West Indian's poor health, to the Commission as evidence.

According to Brinsly Samaroo, Florence's husband Howard was removed from his governmental position in Trinidad for his sympathies towards the workers. Both he and his wife believed they had "just cause" to revolt.

The relatively prompt arrival of the Moyne Commission to the British West Indies following the labour and civil unrest cannot be separated from the looming threat of war in Europe. Trinidad experienced one of the larger labour uprisings and was an important source of oil for the British Empire. There fear not only that a disgruntled employee would sabotage the oilfields but also that any further disruptions to the industry would hinder future war efforts.

The risk to British interest in oil resources sparked an immediate commission from the Trinidadian Colonial Government. The Forester Commission of 1937 reported on the conditions solely in Trinidad and the British Parliament, in turn, established a Royal Commission.

At this time the governments of Germany and Italy were openly critical of Britain's colonial history of subjection and exploitation. British citizens, too, were often antagonistic towards their nation's colonial policies. The United States, although far less vocal, was critical of what it saw as a failed imperial model.

Howard Johnson emphasises that the commission was a performance to showcase Britain's "benevolent" attitude towards its colonial subjects. The plan was misguided as the findings were so horrendous that the British government published only the recommendations in 1940 and withheld the bulk of the report until after the war in 1945.

== Royal Commission ==
The Royal Commission was chaired by Walter Guinness, 1st Baron Moyne. Its further members were composed of experts who could offer substantial insight into the Caribbean crisis including the former governor of Jamaica from 1926 to 1932, Sir Edward Stubbs; Dr. Mary Blacklock, an expert in tropical medicine; Professor F. Engledow, an expert in the field of agriculture; economist Hubert Henderson; Dame Rachel Crowdy, a distinguished social reformer; Sir Percy MacKinnon, a representative for Parliament's financial interests; Sir Walter Citrine, 1st Baron Citrine, President of the International Federation of Trade Unions; and two members of parliament, Morgan Jones from the Labour Party and Conservative Ralph Assheton. The Commission's staff also included Florence 'Jean' Winder, who would go on to become the first female parliamentary reporter. According to Johnson, Blacklock's and Crowdy's appointments are important because the Royal Commission required women who would offer a greater understanding towards the plight of women in the West Indies.

The Commission arrived in Jamaica on 1 November 1938, for a tour of the British West Indies that would be cut short at the onset of World War II. The hope was that the commission's arrival would temper the disturbances and tension. Walter Citrine, however, finding the living conditions of the populace absolutely deplorable, aggressively aided the fledgling trade unions of the West Indies and there was considerable fear that he, acting separately from the commission, would ignite further riots. His actions brought scorn from Caribbean business elites and other members of the commission but made him the most recognisable and well liked member to the impoverished West Indians.

Citrine lamented that the "present generation in the West Indies seems to... be carrying a burden of decades if not centuries of neglect". He acted outside his formal obligations, within the Royal Commission, to help improve the quality of life in the British Caribbean by giving information, advice and scholarships.

The full findings were not released for public consumption until 1945 in large for propaganda concerns. Lord Moyne even agreed, at the urging of the War Office, to "moderate the tone" and to cut the "particularly dangerous sections", regarding the state of housing, women and children, from the final report.

Johnson claims that the government had already decided that it was going to spend money to improve the West Indies. The Royal Commission's primary task was to simply be an objective group that could verify the need for financial aid to the Caribbean colonies and, in turn, gain popular support for the actions funded by the British government.

== Recommendations ==
After revealing the "canary in the imperial coal mine", the Moyne Commission urged health and education initiatives along with increased sugar subsidies to stave off a complete and total economic meltdown. Howard Johnson writes that the Colonial Office's response to the Caribbean crisis was to shift the revolutionary antagonism into peaceful reform by funnelling large sums of cash into the region. In an important ideological change, the metropolis, which previously asserted that welfare services were the sole responsibility of the colony, offered large sums of funding. With the recommendations of the Moyne Commission, the Colonial Development and Welfare Act was passed in 1940 to organize and allocate funds to the British West Indies for the purpose of long-term reconstruction. However, Johnson emphasises the lack of benevolence in these reforms. Even though large sums of cash were channelled to the West Indian colonies, it was simply an attempt to keep a crumbling empire together in which the colonial power would still maintain its affluent position as the primary beneficiary of the relationship. The war effort played an important role in the allocation of funds as well. Britain needed its colonies to be strong and with minimal internal strife to maintain strategic strongholds and resources.

The Commission's advocacy of a West Indian Welfare fund, which provided £1 million, over twenty years to the colonies, was perhaps the most “drastic” measure endorsed by the commission. To place this sum in context, Britain was spending £6 million a day on the war. Historian Kevin Singh sees that the welfare efforts made were "palliative given the circumstances". No recommendations were made to address the stagnant economic system except to place greater emphasis on local food production and to build upon industries such as tourism, fishing and "craft earthenware".

Not all recommendations from the Moyne Commission were directed at Britain or the political elites. Joan French shows that the commission placed a large burden of responsibility on women and suggested them to exit the workforce to stay home. The idea was that by withdrawing from the workforce, more opportunities for employment would open up for males, who would, in turn, support their families. Women would, in turn, take care of their families' domestic lives and also become active volunteers responsible for the social well being of the colony. That proposition was seen by many women as a new slavery in which their service would be to men, the old and the sick. The Moyne Commission was positive that the lack of a "proper family" structure in the West Indies was responsible for the poverty, high rates of child mortality, venereal disease and general ill health that plagued the islands.

Following the report, the Jamaican Imperial Government in particular sought to limit its expenditures on social programs and pushed aggressively for non-paid social work as the primary means to improve social and health conditions. Although the local governments, along with organisations such as the YWCA, were quick to adopt monogamy and family as the best possible solution, French claims that far too few actions were taken to improve family nutrition or access to health care for any change in family structure to be effective.

Despite the sympathy many of the commission members displayed towards West Indian residents, The Moyne Report was ambivalent in its recommendations. Singh asserts that its main goal in crafting the recommendations was to maintain the status quo, a region dependent on the metropole with labourers creating abundant affluence for the empire with minimal benefit for themselves. Activists, labour leaders and West Indians were sceptical and scornful of The Moyne Report. They asserted that it did not address the institutional roots of inequality in the West Indian colonies, the lack of freedom, responsible government or social reform.

== Bibliography ==
- Basdeo, Sahadeo. "Walter Citrine and the British Caribbean Workers Movement during the Commission Hearing, 1938–39". Journal of Caribbean History 18 (1983): 43–59.
- Bolland, O. Nigel. On the March: Labour Rebellions in the British Caribbean, 1934–39. Kingston: Ian Randle Publishers, 1995. ISBN 978-976-8100-52-8.
- Bolland, O. Nigel. The Politics of Labour in the British Caribbean. Kingston: Ian Randle Publishers, 2001. ISBN 976-8100-52-4.
- Brereton, Bridget, and Yelvington, Kevin A., eds. The Colonial Caribbean in Transition: Essays on Postemancipation social and Cultural History. Gainesville: University Press of Florida, 1999.
- Fraser, Cary. "The Twilight of Colonial Rule in the British West Indies: Nationalist Assertion vs. Imperial Hubris in the 1930s". Journal of Caribbean History 30 (1996): 1–27.
- French, Joan. "Colonial Policy Towards Women after the 1938 Uprisings: the Case of Jamaica". Caribbean Quarterly 34 (1988): 38–61.
- Johnson, Howard. "The Political Uses of Commissions of Inquiry: The Forester and Moyne Commissions". In The Trinidad Labour Riots of 1937: Perspectives 50 Years Later, edited by Roy Darrow Thomas, 266–290. St. Augustine: University of the West Indies Press, 1987.
- Mandle, Jay R. "British Caribbean Economic History: an Interpretation". In The Modern Caribbean, edited by Franklin W. Knight and *Colin Palmer, 229–258. Chapel Hill: University of North Carolina Press, 1989.
- Parker, Jason C. Brother's Keeper: the United States, Race and Empire in the British Caribbean, 1937–1962. New York: Oxford University Press, 2008.
- Singh, Kelvin. Race and Class Struggles in a Colonial State: Trinidad 1917–1945. Calgary: University of Calgary Press, 1994. ISBN 1-895176-43-3.
