= Tooni Mahto =

British marine biologist

Tooni Mahto is a marine biologist, oceanographer and campaigner known for co-presenting the BBC series Oceans and Britain's Secret Seas.

== Career ==
Tooni Mahto graduated from Plymouth University and has worked in television as camera operator and researcher at the BBC's Natural History Unit. She works for the Australian Marine Conservation Society (AMCS) as a Marine Campaigns Officer.
