= Sara Santoro =

Italian archaeologist, classical scholar

Sara Santoro Bianchi (1950–2016) was an Italian archaeologist, classical scholar and educator. She is remembered for her collaboration in projects focusing on the Insula del Centenario in Pompeii, Castelraimondo del Fiuli, Bliesbruck on the French-German border, and the excavation of the Amphitheatre of Durrës in Albania. She has served as director of the Archaeological Museum of Bazzano, Province of Bologna, and as a professor of archaeology and Greek and Roman art at the University of Parma and at the D'Annunzio University of Chieti–Pescara.

== Biography ==
Born in Seregno, Milan, on 28 August 1950, Sara Santoro studied classics at the University of Bologna where she met Massimo Bianchi (born 1946), an economics professor. The two married in January 1970 and had three children together: Sergio, Marco and Andrea.

After graduating in 1973, she undertook research in the university's department of archaeology from 1975. From 1997 to 2009, she was associate professor of archaeology and Greek and Roman art at the University of Parma. She was then appointed professor of classical architecture at the D'Annunzio University of Chieti–Pescara (2009–2016).

In 1988, Santoro managed excavations of the fortified settlement of Castelraimondo del Friuli with the support of the European Interreg initiative. This culminated in the development of a cultural park. Working in collaboration with the University of Bologna, from 1998 to 2005 she was scientific manager of the Insula del Centenario project in Pompeii. She was also director of the University of Parma's Durres project aimed at protecting the archaeological heritage of Durrës in Albania. In 2008, together with the French archaeologist Jean-Paul Petit, Santoro participated in excavations of the extensive Mediomatrici site covering the area from Reinheim in the German Saarland to Bliesbruck in the French department Moselle.

Sara Santoro Bianhi died in Chieti on 22 September 2016 and is buried in Cesena.
