= Paul Rose (TV presenter) =

British explorer and TV presenter

- Born: Paul Rose; 1951 (age 74–75); Elm Park, Hornchurch, Essex, England
- Occupations: TV presenter; Public speaker; Antarctic base commander; Professional diver; Mountain and polar guide

Paul Rose (born 1951) is a British television presenter who mainly works for the BBC. He is an accomplished diver, mountaineer and explorer whose skills and interests led to his role as a documentary presenter.

== Career ==
=== Royal Geographical Society ===
Rose was vice-president of the Royal Geographical Society from 1999 to 2002 and made frequent expeditions to Antarctica, supporting scientists engaged in research, and for eight 6-month seasons was base commander of Rothera Research Station.

=== TV presenter ===
In 2006, Rose presented the five-part BBC Four documentary series Voyages of Discovery.

In 2008 he co-presented the eight-part BBC Two documentary series Oceans.

In 2011 he co-presented the four-part BBC Two documentary series Britain's Secret Seas.

Since the mid 2010s, Paul Rose has been involved with a number of walking documentaries made as part of the BBC's commitment to regional programming. In 2016, his five-part programme Coastal Path series showed Rose on the 630 mile South West Coast Path, with the series originally broadcast as a regional BBC One show for people in the southwest and Channel Islands. Coastal Path would go on to be repeated nationally for viewers on BBC Two in the following years and would end up as a BBC Four programme, which, like much other content on the channel, has been repeated many times.

In 2017, Rose presented a two-part BBC One documentary on the Yorkshire Wolds Way, a walk of around 80 miles from the Humber to Filey, on the North Yorkshire coast. During the programme, Rose explored the wildlife and geographical features of the landscape he encountered. In the second part of the documentary he took a dramatic glider flight from the Wolds Gliding Club, Pocklington, over part of the Wolds Way.

In 2018, he presented the four-part BBC One series The Lakes with Paul Rose, about the English Lake District.
