= Simon Keay =

British archaeologist (1954–2021)

- Born: 21 May 1954; Paddington, London, England
- Died: 7 April 2021 (aged 66); Winchester, England
- Occupation: Archaeologist
- Years active: 1985–2020
- Spouse: Nina Inzani (m. 1986)
- Children: 2

Academic background
- Education: University College London (BA, PhD)
- Thesis: Late Roman Amphorae in the Western Mediterranean: A Typology and Economic Study: The Catalan Evidence (1983)

Simon James Keay, FBA (21 May 1954 – 7 April 2021) was a British archaeologist and academic. Keay specialized in the archaeology of the Roman Empire, particularly Roman Mediterranean ports, commerce and cultural change in Italy and Iberia.

== Background ==
Simon Keay was born in St Mary's Hospital, London, on 21 May 1954. His father, Anthony Keay, was British, and his mother, Lorelei (née Shiel) Keay, was born in New Zealand and raised in Australia. He attended Downside School in Stratton-on-the-Fosse, Somerset.

Keay received his BA (1977) and PhD (1983); funded by a British Academy Scholarship from University College London. His thesis, Late Roman Amphorae in the Western Mediterranean: A Typology and Economic Study: The Catalan Evidence, was published in 1984.

== Career ==
Keay joined the University of Southampton in 1985 as lecturer in Iberian Archaeology, eventually becoming Professor of Roman Archaeology in 1997 where he remained until his retirement in 2020.

He was a research professor and director of archaeology at the British School at Rome from 2006.

== Personal life and death ==
In 1986, Keay married Nina Inzani, whom he had first met during an excavation in Spain. They had two children.

Keay died from ALS at Royal Hampshire County Hospital in Winchester on 7 April 2021, at the age of 66.

== Honours ==
In 1986, he was elected a Fellow of the Society of Antiquaries

In July 2016, Keay was elected a Fellow of the British Academy (FBA), the United Kingdom's national academy for the humanities and social sciences.

== Necrology ==
- Martin Millett "Simon Keay obituary: Archaeologist who specialised in the Roman empire, focusing on ports and commerce in Italy and Spain" The Guardian 9 May 2021
