= Roberta Tomber =

British archaeologist and museum curator (1954–2022)

Roberta S. Tomber FSA
- Born: 1954
- Died: 1 May 2022 (aged 67–68)
- Occupation: Archaeologist

Academic work
- Institutions: Museum of London Archaeology Service; University of Southampton; British Museum

Roberta S. Tomber FSA (1954 – 1 May 2022) was a British archaeologist.

== Biography ==
Tomber had worked for the Museum of London Archaeology Service (1988–2001) and the University of Southampton (2002–2004) before joining the British Museum as an Honorary Visiting Researcher in the Department of Conservation and Scientific Research. Her ceramic research focussed on ancient Mediterranean, Red Sea, and Indian Ocean contacts.

She was elected a member of the council of the Roman Society in June 2019. She was elected as a Fellow of the Society of Antiquaries of London in 1995.

== Publications ==
- Tomber, R. 2013. "Pots, coins and trinkets in Rome’s trade with the East", in PS Wells (ed) Rome Beyond its Frontiers: Imports, Attitudes and Practices (Journal Roman Archaeology Supp 94). Portsmouth Rhode Island, 87–104.
- Tomber, R., Blue, L., and Abraham, S. (eds) 2010. Migration, Trade and Peoples, Part I: Indian Ocean Commerce and the Archaeology of Western India, The British Association for South Asian Studies.
- Tomber, R. 2008. Indo-Roman trade: from pots to pepper. London, Duckworth.
- Tomber, R. 2007. "Rome and Mesopotamia – importers into India in the first millennium AD", Antiquity 81, 972–88.
- Tomber, R. and Dore, J. 1998. The National Roman Fabric Reference Collection. A Handbook. Museum of London Archaeology Service Monography 2. London, MOLAS.
- Davies, B., Richardson, B., and Tomber, R. 1994. A Dated Typology of Early Roman Pottery from the City of London (CBA Res Rep 98). Council for British Archaeology.
