= Cornwall Archaeological Society =

- Formation: 1961; 65 years ago
- Type: Archaeology
- Purpose: Study of archaeology in Cornwall and the Isles of Scilly
- Headquarters: Cornwall
- Location: Cornwall
- Official language: English
- Website: cornisharchaeology.org.uk

Cornwall Archaeological Society is an amateur archaeological society based in Cornwall, United Kingdom for the study of archaeology in Cornwall and the Isles of Scilly. It was founded in 1961 by members of the West Cornwall Field Club.

== History ==
=== West Cornwall Field Club ===
The West Cornwall Field Club was founded by Lt Col F. C. Hirst and six of the volunteers who were excavating a site at Porthmeor, in the parish of Zennor from 1933 to 1935. Membership increased to nineteen in 1937 and averaged fifty in the 1950s. Between 1953 and 1961 the club produced twenty-seven publications including six field guides and an annual journal, and the club members took part in forty excavations. During the fifties many members lived in mid and east Cornwall and the field club was publishing increasingly more articles from those areas. It was felt that the name no longer relevant to the scope of the field club and at the annual general meeting on 10 August 1961 it was unanimously approved to change the title to Cornwall Archaeological Society.

=== Cornwall Archaeological Society ===
The first President of the society was C. A. Ralegh Radford an archaeologist and historian from Devon who specialised in the Dark Ages. Florence Nankivell was a notable member present at many digs, and secretary of the organisation.

== Excavations ==
The Society has organised a number of excavations. One, considered to be outstanding was at Carn Brea led by Roger Mercer from 1970 to 1973, which established a new class of site — the Early Neolithic tor enclosure.

- 1962 Castilly henge, near Lanivet
- 1963 The Rumps
- 1964 Carn Euny

== Publications ==
The Society publishes a journal Cornish Archaeology Hendhyscans Kernow in most years. The first was published in 1962 and the latest, number 54, was published in 2015. A newsletter is published three times a year.

== List of presidents ==
The following have served as presidents of the society since its foundation in 1961.

- 1961–65 C. A. Ralegh Radford
- 1965–68 Martyn Jope
- 1968–73 Andrew Saunders
- 1973–76 Patricia M. Christie
- 1976–80 Paul Ashbee
- 1980–84 G. J. Wainwright
- 1984–88 Charles Thomas
- 1988–91 Cynthia A. Gaskell-Brown
- 1991–94 N. V. Quinnell
- 1994–97 Martin Fletcher
- 1997–99 Peter Gathercole
- 2004–07 Henrietta Quinnell
- 2012–15 Valerie Maxwell
- 2015–1? Nick Johnson
- 201?–present Caroline Dudley
