= Richard Reece =

Archaeologist (born 1939)

Richard Reece FSA
- Born: Richard Marsden Reece; 25 March 1939 (age 87)

Academic background
- Education: University College London; Wadham College, Oxford
- Thesis: A survey of denominations and categories in the currency of the western Roman Empire, with special reference to hoards and site finds in Britain (1972)

Academic work
- Discipline: Archaeology
- Sub-discipline: Numismatics; Roman coinage; Roman Britain; Western Roman Empire; classical archaeology; Later Roman Empire
- Institutions: Institute of Archaeology; University College London

Richard Marsden Reece, FSA (born 25 March 1939) is a British numismatist and retired academic. After working as a chemistry teacher, he undertook a doctorate in archaeology at Wadham College, Oxford, and then became a lecturer at the Institute of Archaeology, London. He was Reader in Late Roman Archaeology and Numismatics from 1994 until he retired in 1999.

== Biography ==
Reece completed a degree in biochemistry at University College London in 1961, before moving to Wadham College, Oxford, where he completed a diploma in education the following year. He taught at the private St John's School in Leatherhead for three years before becoming Head of Chemistry at St George's School in Harpenden in 1966.

He left teaching in 1968 to undertake a doctorate at Wadham College, Oxford and the Faculty of Literae Humaniores, University of Oxford. He completed his Doctor of Philosophy (DPhil) degree in 1972 with a thesis titled "A survey of denominations and categories in the currency of the western Roman Empire, with special reference to hoards and site finds in Britain". He joined the London Institute of Archaeology as a lecturer in 1970. Promoted to a senior lecturer in 1981, he was made Reader in Late Roman Archaeology and Numismatics. He has been an emeritus reader at UCL since retiring in 1999.

== Reece periods ==
Reece defined 21 date ranges for coins of the Roman period, now called Reece periods; two more periods were added later by Sam Moorhead. (Note: 22 (AD 402–445) and 23 (AD 445–498)) The British Museum and others uses these periods when comparing different discovery sites.

Original Reece Periods
Period	Date range
1	to AD 41
2	41–54
3	54–69
4	69–96
5	96–117
6	117–138
7	138–161
8	161–180
9	180–192
10	193–222
11	222–238
12	238–260
13	260–275
14	275–296
15	296–317
16	317–330
17	330–348
18	348–364
19	364–378
20	378–388
21	388–402

== Honours and awards ==
On 5 May 1969, Reece was elected a Fellow of the Society of Antiquaries of London (FSA). He was made an honorary fellow of the Royal Numismatic Society (RNS) in 2003. The RNS presented him with Medal of the Royal Numismatic Society six years later. In 2014, he was awarded the British Academy's Derek Allen Prize for numismatics.

== Selected works ==
- Reece, Richard (1970). Roman coins. Practical Handbooks for Collectors (1st ed.). London: Ernest Benn Ltd.
- Reece, Richard (1981). Excavations in Iona, 1964 to 1974. University College London Institute of Archaeology Publications. Vol. 7. London: Routledge. ISBN 978-0905853093.
- Reece, Richard; James, Simon (1986). Identifying Roman coins: a practical guide to the identification of site finds in Britain. London: Seaby. ISBN 978-0900652790.
- Reece, Richard (1987). Coinage in Roman Britain (1st ed.). London: Seaby Publications. ISBN 9780900652868.
- Reece, Richard (1999). The Later Roman Empire: an Archaeology AD 150–600. Stroud: Tempus Publishing. ISBN 9780752414492.
- Reece, Richard (2002). The Coinage of Roman Britain (2nd ed.). Cheltenham: The History Press. ISBN 978-0752425238.
