= Mons Porphyrites =

Group of ancient quarries in Egypt

Coordinates: 27°14′51″N 33°18′26″E

Mons Porphyrites (today Gebel Dokhan) is the mountainous site of a group of ancient quarries in the Red Sea Hills of the Eastern Desert in Egypt. Under the Roman Empire, they were the only known source of the purple "imperial" variety of porphyry. They were exploited between the 1st and 5th centuries AD. The other imperial quarries in the Eastern Desert were Mons Claudianus, Mons Ophiates and Tiberiane. These four quarries were probably under a unified administration, since the same procurator metallorum is found in more than one.

The quarries were discovered by Caius Cominus Leugas in AD 18. Their exploitation can be traced by hundreds of ostraca from not long after until the 430s. They were accessible only by means of a circuitous branch of the road between Caene on the Nile and the Roman fort on the Red Sea coast (today Abu Sha'ar). The small fort of Deir el-Atrash lies along the route.

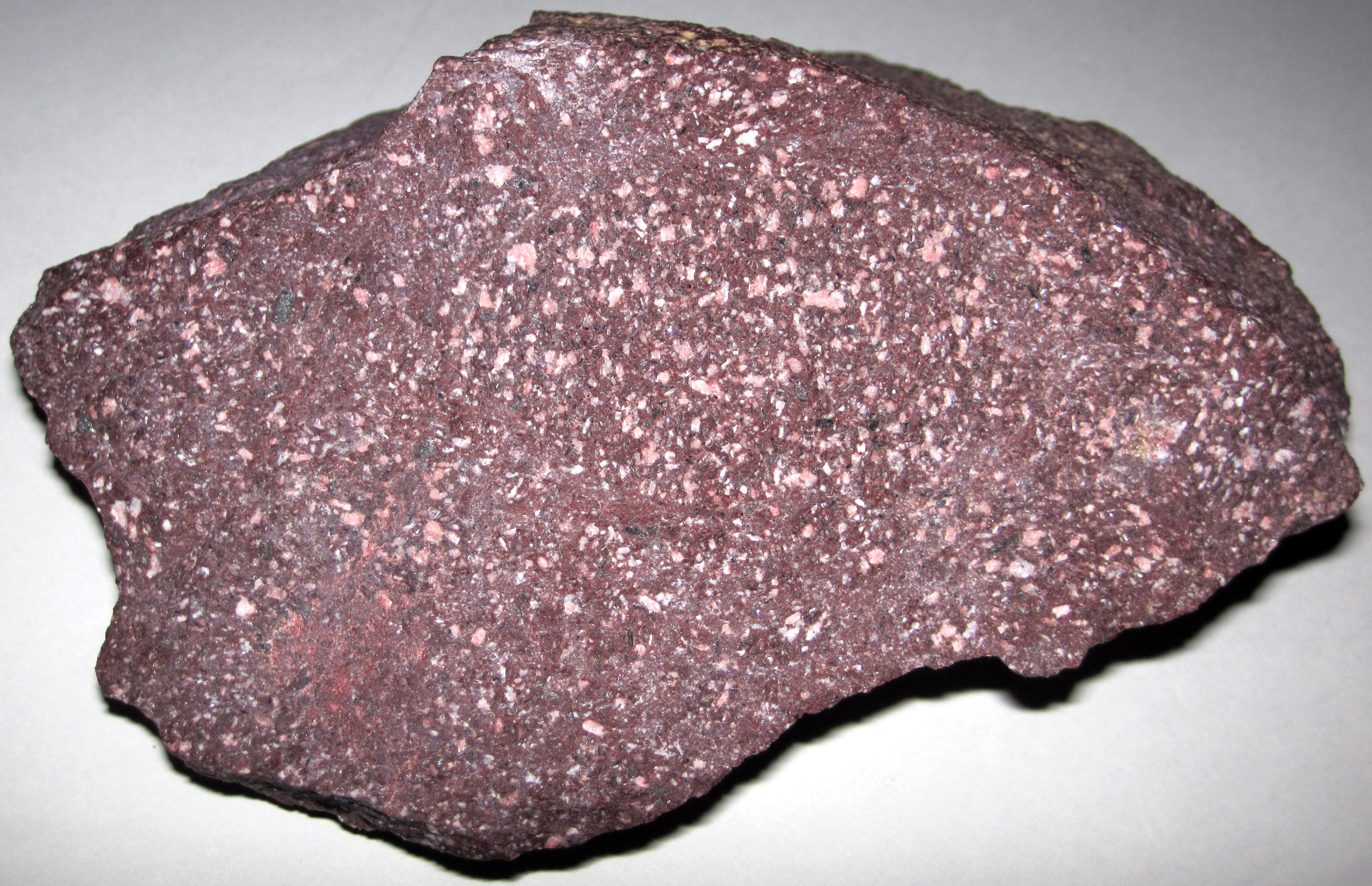
Imperial porphyry mined from Mons Porphyrites

The actual quarries were spread out over 9 square kilometres (3.5 sq mi). There were five dispersed villages for workers and a central complex at Wadi Abu Ma'amel 630 metres (2,070 ft) above sea level. The highest quarries were at Rammius at 1,438 metres (4,718 ft). Quarried stone had to be dropped down slipways to the wadi below. The central complex had a workers' settlement, a fort, temples to Sarapis and Isis Megiste, a bath with a hypocaust and a cemetery. The temple of Isis can be dated to 113 and that of Sarapis to 117–119. There is evidence for blacksmithing in the workers' area. A second temple to Isis Myrionyma, dating to 137–138, lay on the other side of the wadi. The central complex had two wells and large cistern for water storage in the fort.

The earliest settlement, where an inscription of Cominus Leugas is found, contains a temple to Pan. Several of the villages were only occupied into the 2nd century, but there are later tombstones, pottery and coins from the higher quarries. A tower at the central complex allowed for visual communication with even the most distant posts. Besides the main fort, there were also fortlets at Badia, Umm Sidri and Belia.

Mons Porphyrites produced black porphyry as well as the imperial porphyry for which it is most famous. The latter was used in Rome and Constantinople for decorative purposes, especially in imperial sarcophagi.

== Bibliography ==
- Hirt, Alfred Michael (2010). Imperial Mines and Quarries in the Roman World: Organizational Aspects, 27 BC – AD 235. Oxford University Press.
- Keenan, James G. (2018). "Mons Porphyrites". In Nicholson, Oliver (ed.). The Oxford Dictionary of Late Antiquity, Volume 2: J–Z. Oxford: Oxford University Press. p. 1035. ISBN 978-0-19-881625-6.
- Marchand, Julie; Bomin, Joachim Le; Bülow-Jacobsen, Adam (2022). "Signed by Valerius: an Early Imperial wall painting from the fort of Deir el-Atrash in the Egyptian Eastern Desert". Journal of Roman Archaeology. 35 (2): 713–742. doi:10.1017/S1047759422000307. hdl:2013/ULB-DIPOT:oai:dipot.ulb.ac.be:2013/362095. ISSN 1047-7594.
