= Lucy Blue (archaeologist) =

Maritime archaeologist

Lucy Blue is a maritime archaeologist who is a senior lecturer at Southampton University. She is known for co-presenting the BBC series Oceans.

== Career ==
Blue graduated from Oxford University 1996 with a DPhil in Maritime Archaeology and is currently a professor at University of Southampton Maritime & Marine Institute theme leader at the Centre for Maritime Archaeology in Southampton.
