= Michael Fulford =

British archaeologist and academic

Michael Fulford CBE FBA FSA
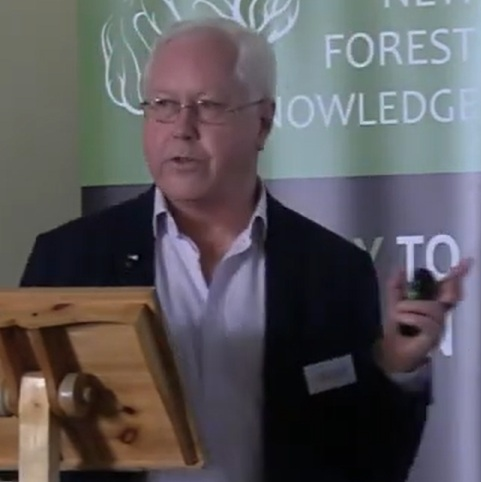
- Professor Michael Fulford lecturing in 2017
- Born: October 1948 (age 77–78)

Academic background
- Education: University of Southampton

Academic work
- Discipline: Archaeologist
- Sub-discipline: Archaeology of Great Britain; British Iron Age; Roman Britain; landscape archaeology
- Institutions: University of Southampton; University of Oxford; University of Reading

Michael Gordon Fulford, CBE, FBA, FSA (born October 1948) is a British archaeologist and academic, specialising in the British Iron Age, Roman Britain and landscape archaeology. He has been Professor of Archaeology at the University of Reading since 1993.

== Early life and education ==
Fulford was born in October 1948 in Hampshire, England. He was educated at St Edward's School, Oxford, then an all-boys private boarding school. He studied Archaeology and Latin at Southampton University, graduating with a Bachelor of Arts (BA) degree in 1970 and a Doctor of Philosophy (PhD) degree in 1975. His doctoral thesis was titled "New Forest Roman Pottery".

== Academic career ==
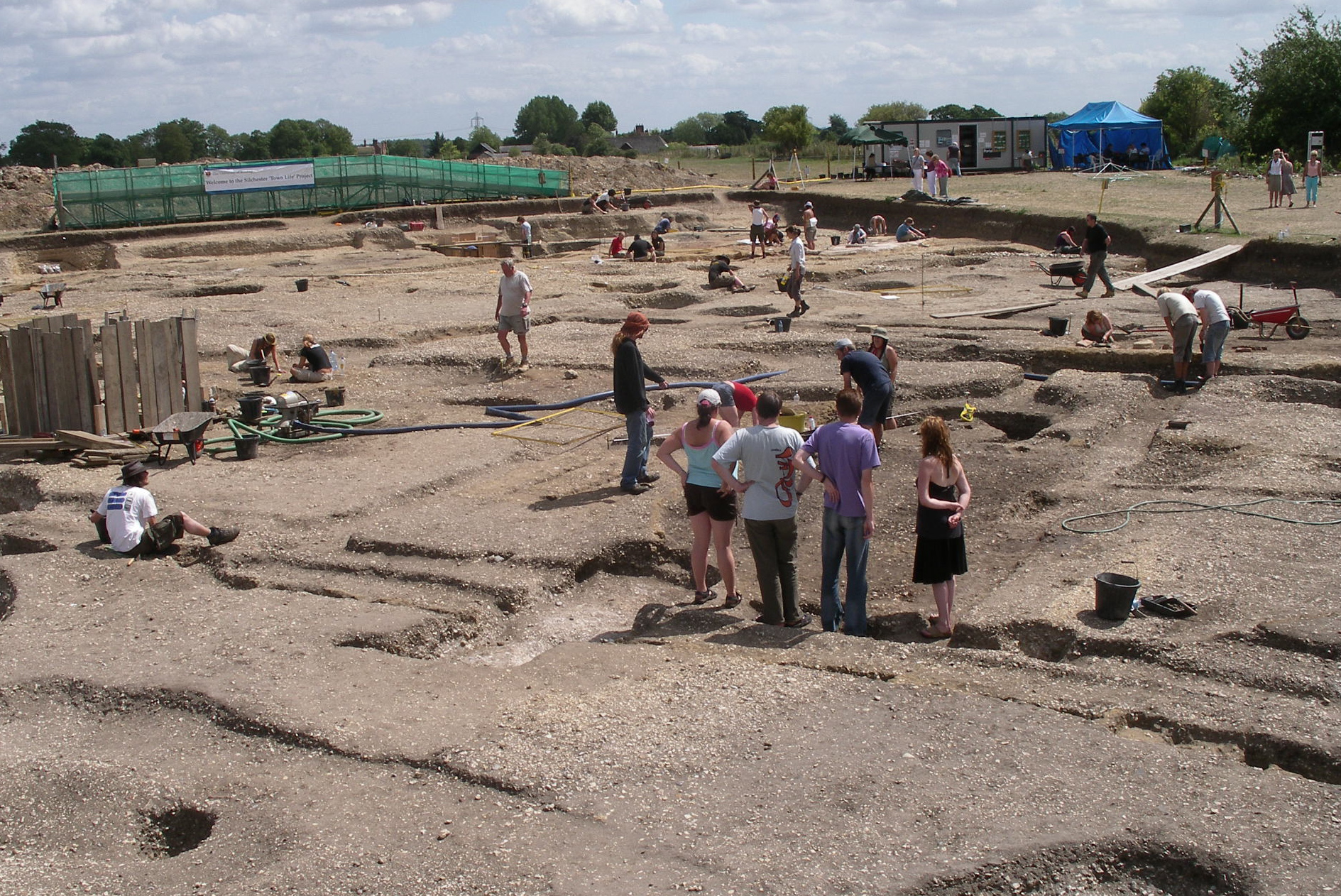
Excavations at Calleva Atrebatum in 2006 (near Silchester in Hampshire)

Between 1971 and 1974, he was employed as the personal research assistant of Professor Sir Barry Cunliffe; first at the University of Southampton, then at the University of Oxford. He joined the University of Reading as a lecturer in archaeology in 1974, and promoted to reader in 1985. He received a personal chair in 1988 and was made Professor of Archaeology in 1993. He has also been Dean of the Faculty of Letters and Social Sciences and Pro-Vice-Chancellor (1998–2004).

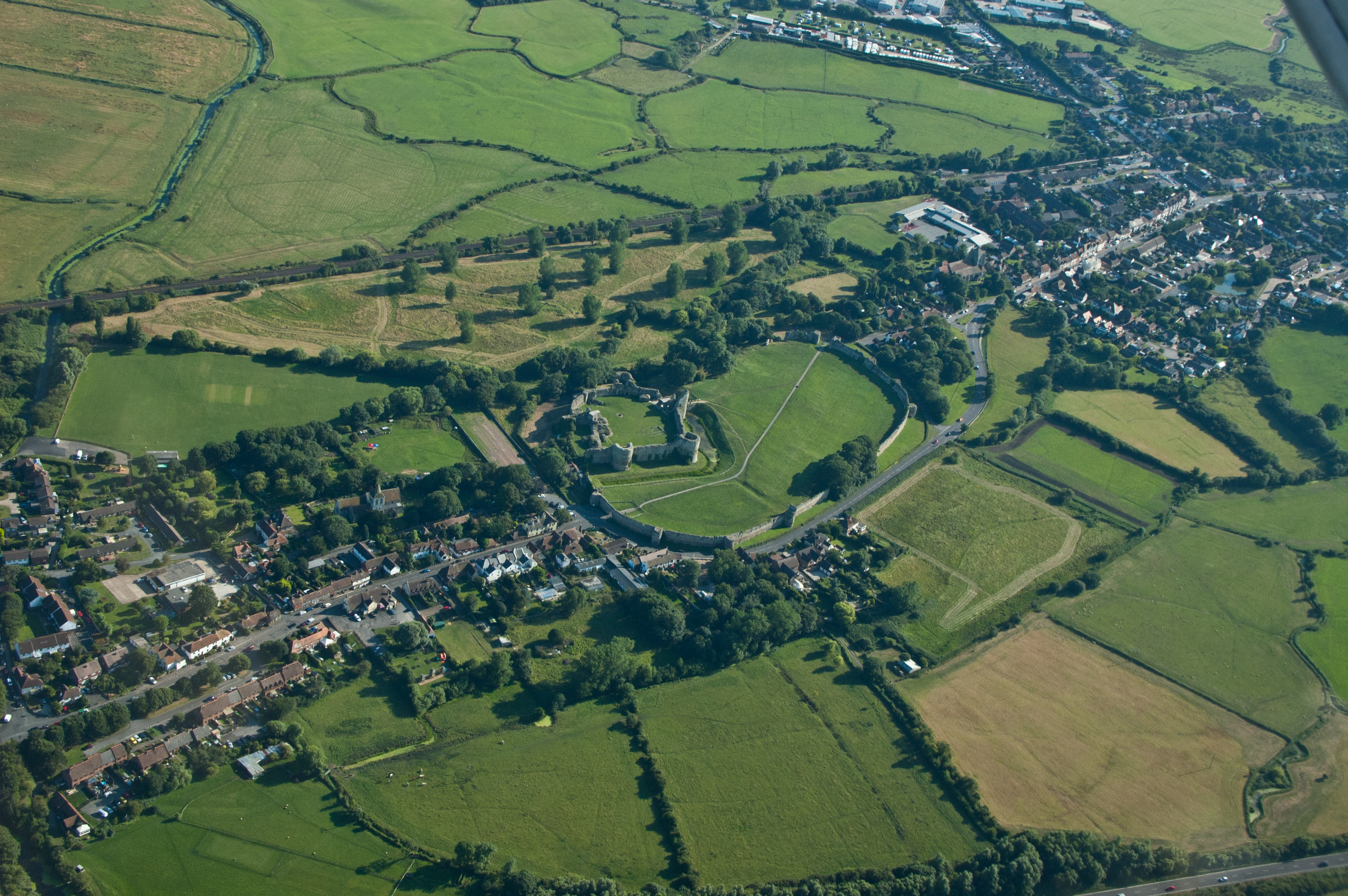
In the 1990s Fulford was involved with excavations at Pevensey Castle (above centre) in East Sussex, and co-wrote a book on it with Stephen Rippon.

He served on both the Council and the Executive and Research Committees of the Society of Antiquaries of London. He is currently the Honorary Treasurer of the British Academy.

Between 1994 and 1998, he was editor for the academic journal Britannia. Fulford served as the president of the Society for the Promotion of Roman Studies from 2005 to 2008, and as of 2021 is an honorary vice-president of the society. For the period between 2003 and 2007, he was granted the Leverhulme Major Research Fellowship. Fulford has served as chairman of the Roman Research Trust since 2009.

Fulford has published widely on subjects relating to Romano-British and Roman archaeology, especially with regards to the dynamics of towns, landscape archaeology and the economy. He is probably best known for a series of digs conducted since 1974 at the site of the former Iron Age and Romano-British town of Silchester (Calleva Atrebatum), Hampshire.

Fulford was appointed a Commissioner of English Heritage (now Historic England) in 2014.

== Honours ==
Fulford was appointed Commander of the Order of the British Empire (CBE) in the 2011 New Year Honours.

In 1977, Fulford was elected a Fellow of the Society of Antiquaries of London (FSA). In 1994, he was elected a Fellow of the British Academy (FBA).

In 2013, a supplement of the Journal of Roman Archaeology was published in Fulford's honour. Fulford won the 2015 Archaeologist of the Year award at the Current Archaeology Awards, as voted for by the general public: the awards were announced on 27 February 2015 as part of the annual Current Archaeology Live! conference.

== Selected writing ==
- (2022). The Emperor Nero's Pottery and Tilery at Little London, Pamber, by Silchester, Hampshire. The Excavations of 2017. Britannia monograph series 36. London.
- (2015), with N. Holbrook. The Towns of Roman Britain. The Contribution of Commercial Archaeology since 1990. Society for the Promotion of Roman Studies. Britannia monograph series 27. London.
- (2013), with E. Durham. Seeing Red: New Economic and Social Perspectives on Gallo-Roman Terra Sigillata. University of London, Institute of Classical Studies, London.
- (2011), with A. Clarke. Silchester: City in Transition. The Mid-Roman Occupation of Insula IX c. A.D. 125-250/300. A report on excavations undertaken since 1997. Society for the Promotion of Roman Studies. Britannia monograph series 25. London.
- (2006), with A. Clarke and H. Eckardt. Life and Labour in Late Roman Silchester: Excavations in Insula IX from 1997. Society for the Promotion of Roman Studies. Britannia monograph series 22. London.
- (2006), with A.B. Powell, R. Entwhistle, F. Raymond. Iron Age and Romano-British Settlements and Landscapes of Salisbury Plain.Wessex Archaeology Monograph 20. Wessex Archaeology. Salisbury.
- (2000), with Jane Timby. Late Iron Age and Roman Silchester: Excavations on the Site of the Forum-Basilica, 1977, 1980–86. Society for the Promotion of Roman Studies.
- (1989) The Silchester Amphitheatre: Excavations of 1979–85. Society for the Promotion of Roman Studies. Britannia monograph series 10. London.
- (1984), with Mark Corney. Silchester: excavations on the defences, 1974–80. Society for the Promotion of Roman Studies. Britannia monograph series. London.
- (1975). New Forest Roman pottery: manufacture and distribution, with a corpus of the pottery types. Oxford.
