= Alaisiagae =

Name or epithet of Germanic goddesses

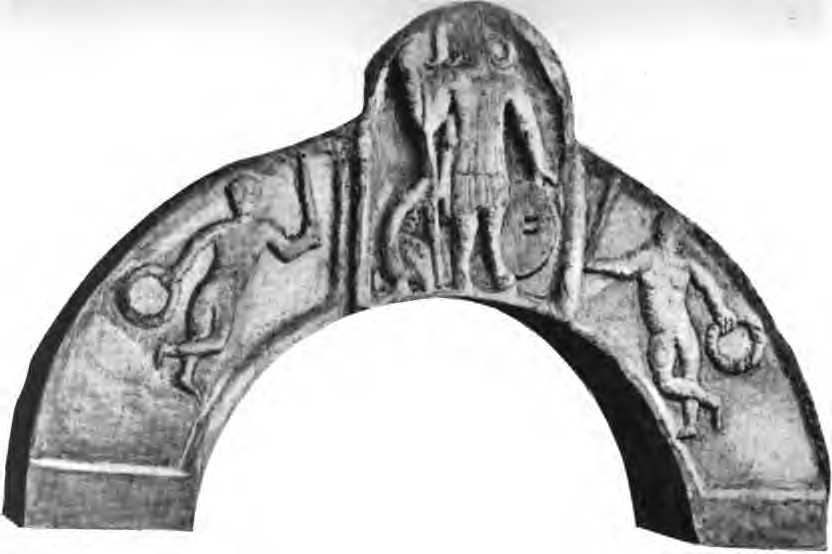
Arch sculptured in relief with figures of the war-god Mars Thincsus with a goose at his feet and two naked goddesses or cupids (maybe the ALaisiagae named Beda and Fimmelena), found near Hadrian's Wall in 1883, now in Chesters Museum.

In Romano-British culture and Germanic polytheism, the Alaisiagae deae /ˌæliəˈsaɪəˌdʒiː/ were Germanic goddesses who deified victory, or, in an alternative interpretation, embodied justice. Their names — possibly meaning the "all‑respected" or "all‑feared" (from Proto West-Germanic *all- + *aizō- "honour, fear") — were mentioned in connection with the syncretic Romano-Celtic god of justice Mars Thincsus or Thingsus, who is commonly associated with the Germanic god *Tīwaz (Old Norse: Týr).

== Centres of worship ==
The Alaisiagae were Germanic deities who were worshipped by Continental auxiliary troops in Roman Britain. Three votive stones dedicated to them and to Mars Thincsus have been recovered in the United Kingdom at Vercovicium (Housesteads Roman Fort) on Hadrian's Wall in England. Their collective name might have been derived from an unidentified place in the vicinity, possibly referred to in Latin as *Alaisiacum. In the early third-century, a small apsidal well shrine was constructed in the settlement or vicus at the base of Chapel Hill, south of the fort. The fort and the vicus were subsequently excavated from 1954 to 1995 by the archaeologists Eric Birley and his son Robin Birley.

A 19th‑century hypothesis proposed that other centres of worship were located at the towns of Bedburg and Bitburg near the German‑Belgian border (the latter referred to as Beda Vicus or "Village of Beda"), as well as in the village of Bettincourt. This interpretation is now regarded as obsolete.

== Syncretism ==
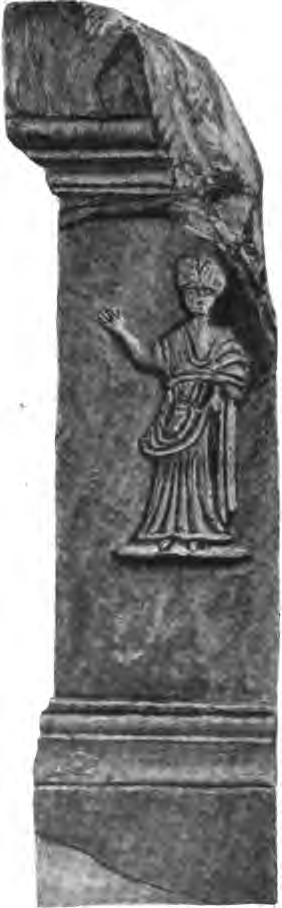
Side view of the portal pillar giving access to the well shrine at Housesteads (1903).

The two pairs of goddesses called the Alaisiagae are named — together with Mars Thincsus and the Numen of Emperor Augustus — on votive stones found in shrines along Hadrian's Wall: Beda and Fimmilena, Baudihille and Friagabis. These Germanic goddesses were imported from the Continent, maybe indirectly from Frisia, by Romanized Germanic troops that arrived in Britain via Gaulic France. They are not attested in the Roman pantheon, but their names are paralleled by a large number of Celtic and Germanic Matronae. The Germanic soldiers who served along Hadrian's Wall more than likely introduced the Alaisiagae to their Roman counterparts, thus spreading worship of these goddesses of victory, fertility and justice. Part of the auxiliaries serving in the Cuneus Frisionum, a unit of shock troops that was originally recruited from Frisia. Pottery finds suggest that locally produced vessels were modeled on examples from the soldiers' homelands in North Holland." Their numbers were reinforced by soldiers called cives Tuihantes, probably originating from the tribe of the Tubantes in the district of Twenthe in the Eastern Netherlands, 60 km north of the Limes.

German scholarship has identified Mars Thincsus, Beda, and Fimmelena as Germanic deities of justice, with Mars Thincsus representing the institution of the thing (assembly), and Beda and Fimmelena associated with two legal institutions (bodthing and fimelthing) known in medieval Friesland. This line of thought was also followed by the mythologist Georges Dumézil and the philologist Rudolf Simek. However, given the great distance in time and the fact that Frisia was repopulated by Anglo-Saxons after the Roman period, the identification remains doubtful.

Other scholars, among which Hilda Ellis Davidson, have suggested that the Alaisiagae were goddesses of war, counterparts of the Nordic valkyries. Recent research suggests that the Alaisiagae were part of a larger group of matronae, who were associated with fertility and ancestor cults.

== Etymology ==
The etymology of the goddess names is not certain. Scholars generally regard all the names as unequivocally Germanic, although one of them may contain a Celtic root. Beda and Fimmelena — due to their association with Mars Thincsus — are commonly interpreted as Frisian goddesses of justice, thought to reflect the institutions of bodþing ("convened thing") and fimelþing ("court of judgement"). Beda, derived from the root *beudaną ("to command"), would thus signify "the mistress of the *bedthing", while Fimmelena, possibly connected with the root *fimbulaz ("something immense"), would denote "the mistress of the fimelþing". Such interpretations must be approached with caution, given both the linguistic complexities and the chronological gap.

The remaining two Alaisiagae are sometimes interpreted as reduplicated forms of the first pair, owing to the occurrence of alliteration in the names of both pairs. Apparently each of the goddesses embodied different qualities: martial, conciliatory, and fertility‑giving.

The name Baudihillia is generally derived from the Celtic root *bowdi- ("victory"), combined with the Germanic suffix *-hildiz ('battle'), designating the goddess as a champion or "victory fighter". An alternative hypothesis, proposed by the German philologist Theodor Siebs (1922), links the designation to the Germanic root *beudaną ("to command, to offer"). The goddess would then be conceived as "ruler of the battle". Following this lead, the character of Baudihillia might be regarded as a precursor to the Germanic princess Beadohild or Böðvildr, daughter of the evil king Niðhad, who is mentioned in the 10th‑century poem Deor as well as in various Nordic sagas.

The name Friagabis is most likely to be understood as denoting generosity, or as "the friendly giver".

== Archeological setting ==
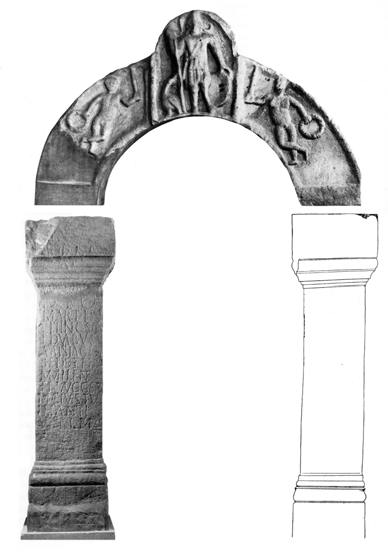
Reconstruction of the entranceway leading into the well shrine dedicated to Mars Thincsus (Cheryl Louise Clay, 2007)

The votive stones of the Celto-Germanic goddesses Alaisiagae were recovered in the shrine of Mars at Vercovicium. This apsidial building, constructed around a sacred well, was located in the settlement at the base of Chapel Hill, just south of the fort. It measured only 3.0 m by 3.7 m internally. Next to the shrine there were a large hall and a workshop. Judging from the votive offerings in money, the spring was in use from the late 2nd to the early 4th century, at which point the site was abandoned. Hence, the shrine should not be confused with a 4th‑century roundhouse of rough stone, which Robin Birley in 1962 mistakenly identified as the temple of Mars Thincsus.

The shrine was built in the early-3rd century upon the ruins of a rectangular workshop in the vicus which had been destroyed during the barbarian incursions of AD 196. It contained altars dedicated by the commanders and men of all three units known to be stationed at Vercovicium to the god Mars Thincsus, the Romanized aspect of a Germanic god, a common occurrence among the Roman auxiliary units. Three votive stones have been found at this site dedicated to Mars and the Alaisiagae; named on one altar as Beda and Fimmilena, on another as Boudihillia and Friagabis.

== Votive inscriptions ==
=== First inscription ===
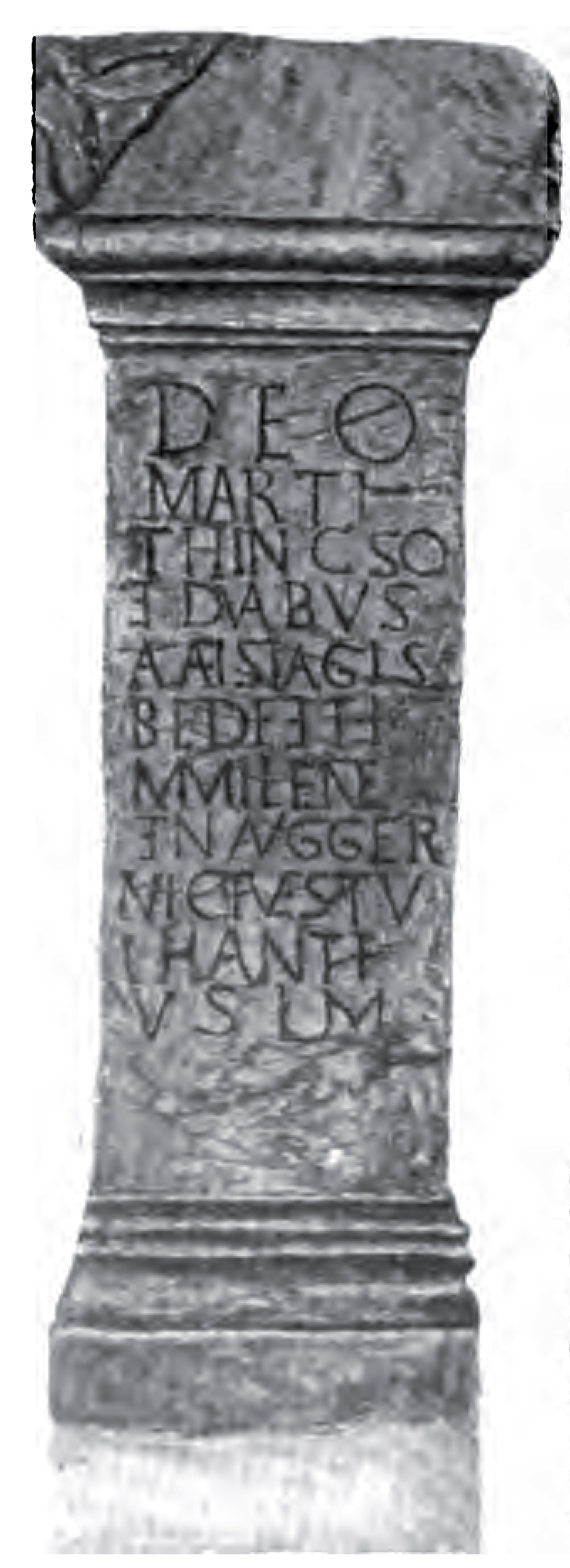
Portar pilar with an inscription dedicated to the deities Mars Thincsus and the Alaisiagae Beda and Fimmilena (RIB 1593, 1903).

Two votive inscriptions referring to the Alaisagae have been found in Housesteads Roman Fort near Hadrian's Wall in 1883. One of them (RIB 1593) was carved on a portal pillar that originally supported an arch at the entrance of the shrine on Chapel Hill. This arch depicted the god Mars Thincsus, accompanied by two naked cupids, or maybe goddesses, and a goose. The pillar, often mistakenly referred to as an altar stone, formed part of the architectural structure of the well shrine rather than serving as a freestanding altar. Its placement at the entrance highlights the symbolic role of the deities represented, welcoming worshippers into the sacred space. It reads:

DEO MARTI THINCSO ET DVABVS ALAISAGIS BEDE ET FIMMILENE ET N(umini) AVG(gusti) GERM(ani) CIVES TVIHANTI V(otum) S(olverunt) L(ibentes) M(erito)
"To the god Mars Thincsus and the two Alaisagae, Beda and Fimmilena, and the divine spirit of the emperor, the German tribesmen from Tuihantis willingly and deservedly fulfill their vow."

The deity of Mars Thincsus or Thingsus, typical of Roman-Celtic syncretism, is correlated with the Germanic war-god Týr. The latter may be associated with oath-taking and the thing, a local assembly of free men. According to Dumézil, at the thing political issues were discussed, judicial decisions made, and religious rites performed. He appears on the arch in a cuirass, with helmet, shield, and spear. Wilhelm Scherer (1884) identified the cives Tvihantis mentioned here as Tubantes from the district of Twenthe. They may have been included in the Cuneus Frisionum mentioned on the altar stone.

=== Second inscription ===
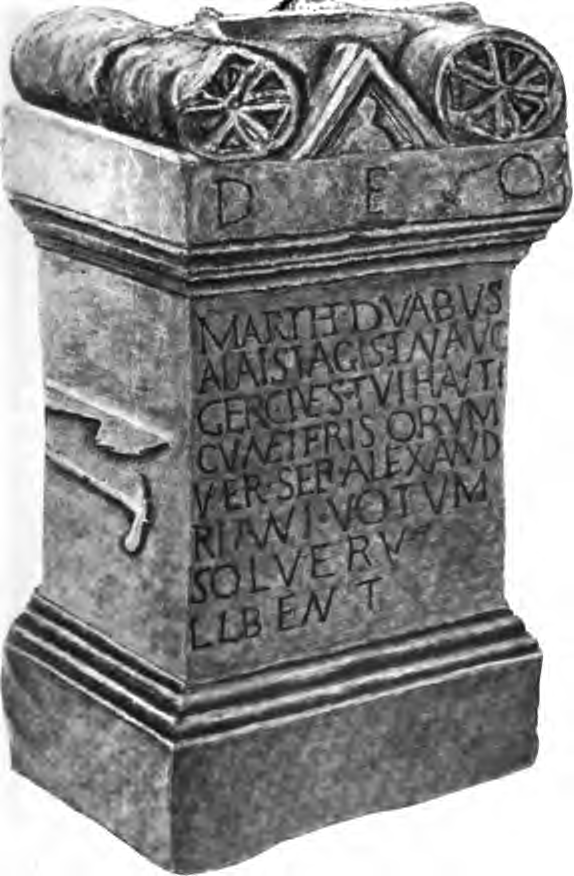
Altar-stone from the temple of Housesteads, mentioning the Alaisiagae (RIB 1594, 1903).

The other votive inscription (RIB 1594) was discovered on an altar stone, not far from the pillar described above.

DEO MARTI ET DUABUS ALAISIAGIS ET N(umini) AUG(usti) GER(mani) CIVES TUIHANTI CUNEI FRISIORUM VER(covicianorum) SE(ve)R(iani) ALEXANDRIANI VOTUM SOLVERUNT LIBENT[es] m(erito)
To the god Mars and the two Alaisiagae and to the Divinity of the Emperor of the Germans. Cives Tuihanti, of the cavalry of Frisians of Vercovicium, styled Severus Alexander's, fulfilled (their) vow willingly, deservedly.

=== Third inscription ===
The third inscription (RIB 1576) on an altar stone, discovered 1920 in Housesteads, reads:

DEABVS ALAISIAGIS BAVDIHILLIE ET FRIAGABI ET N(umini) AVG(usti) N(umerus) HNAVDIFRIDI V(otum) S(olvit) L(ibens) M(erito)
To the goddesses the Alaisiagae, Baudihillia and Friagabis, and to the Divinity of the Emperor the unit of Hnaudifridus gladly and deservedly fulfilled its vow.

== Sources ==
- British Museum, London, England.
- Carlisle Museum, Cumbria, England.
- Lancaster museum, Lancaster, England.
- Newcastle Museum of Antiquities, Newcastle upon Tyne, England.
- Penrith Museum, Penrith, England.
- Vercovicium Roman Museum, Housesteads, Northumberland, England.
- York Castle Museum, York, England.
