= Knag Burn Gateway =

Gateway in Hadrian's Wall in England

- Northumberland, England, UK
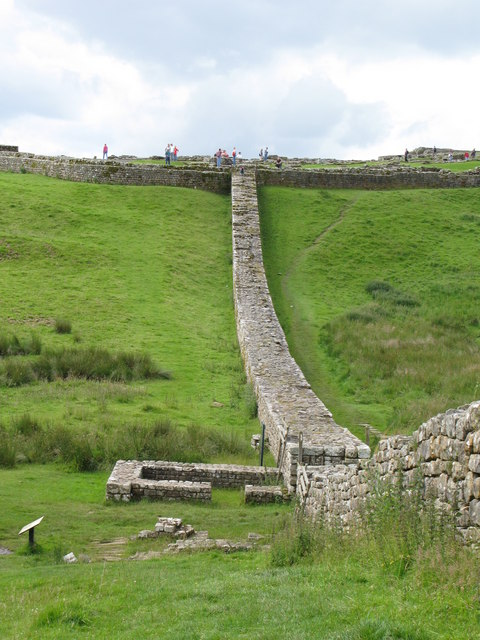
- Remains of the Knag Burn Gateway taken from South of the wall facing West towards Housesteads (visible at the top of the hill)

- The remains of the gateway

Location
- Location in Northumberland
- Coordinates: 55.01466°N 2.32865°W
- Grid reference: NY79086894

The Knag Burn Gateway is a gateway which was built into Hadrian's Wall some time after construction of the wall itself, generally acknowledged to be during the fourth century.

== Location ==
Knag Burn Gateway is located at the point where Hadrian's Wall crosses the Knag Burn, just to the east of Housesteads, between the fort and Turret 36B. The burn itself passes beneath the wall via a culvert a few metres to the West of the gateway.

== Description ==
Knag Burn Gateway is one of the few gates through the wall that isn't part of a milecastle or fort. The remains indicate that the structure consisted of a single-lane gateway, with guard-chambers on either side and a gate at each end, thus allowing two-stage controlled passage through the wall. Professor I. A. Richmond suggested that the gateway was constructed to allow trade traffic through the wall some time in or after the fourth century.

The gateway was discovered in 1855 and excavated in 1936 and 1988. The structure consists of the 3.7 metres (12 ft) wide gateway with two small structures either side.

The two cell structures at either side of the gateway measure 4.65 metres (15.3 ft) by 3.25 metres (10.7 ft), with entrances 0.95 metres (3 ft 1 in) wide (on the side nearest the gateway), which open onto a passage.

== Monument record ==
Monument	Monument Number	English Heritage Archive Number	Scheduled Monument Notification
Knag Burn Gateway	1007856	NY 76 NE 95	14-July-1997
