= Barracks =

Accommodation for military personnel, laborers or prisoners

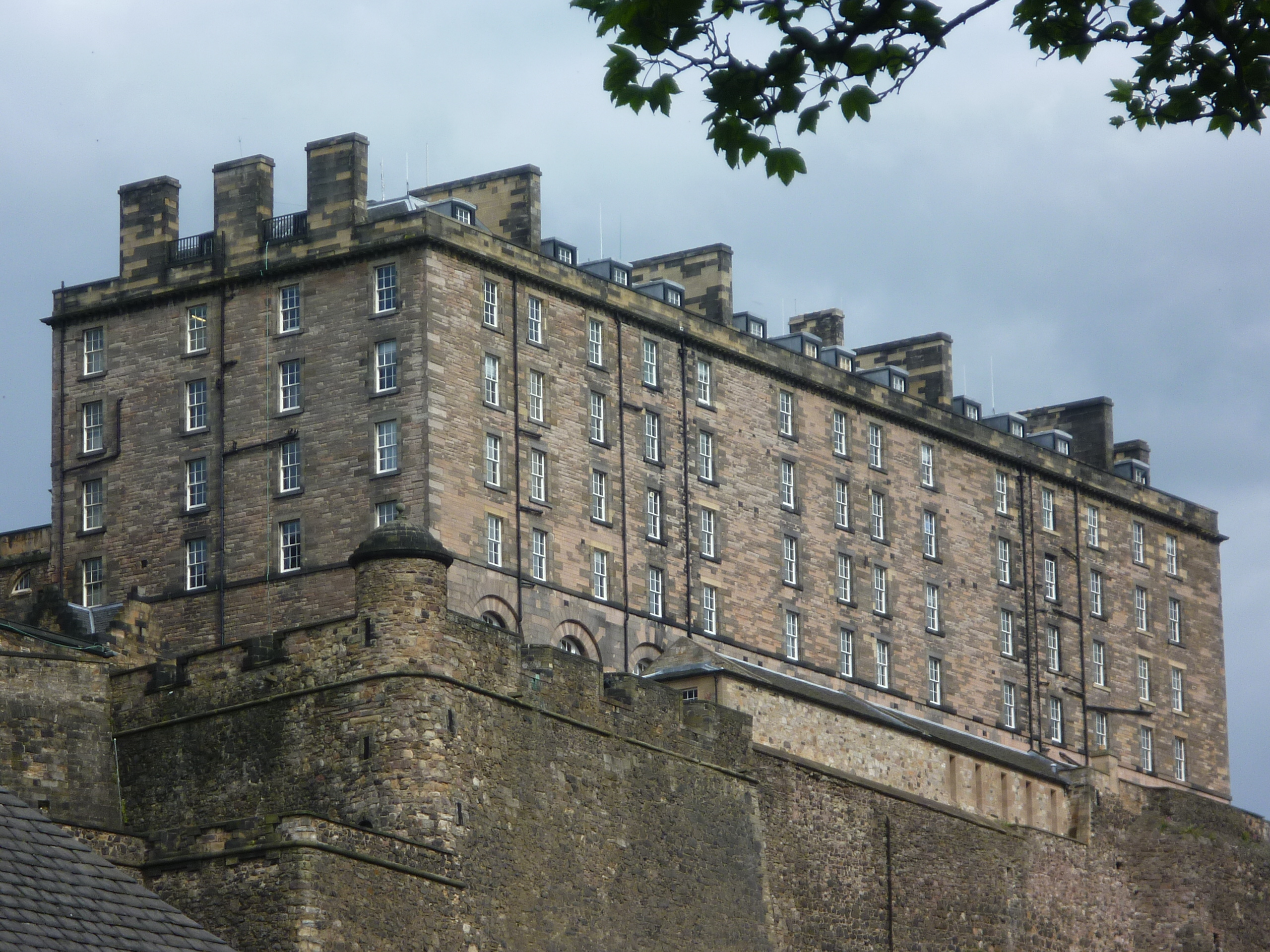
Late 18th century barracks from the reign of George III, Edinburgh Castle, Scotland

Barracks are buildings used to accommodate military personnel and quasi-military personnel such as police. The English word originates from the 17th century via French and Italian from an old Spanish word barraca 'soldier's tent', but today barracks are usually permanent buildings. The word may apply to separate housing blocks or to complete complexes, and the plural form often refers to a single structure and may be singular in construction.

The main objective of barracks is to separate soldiers from the civilian population and reinforce discipline, training, and esprit de corps. They have been called "discipline factories for soldiers". Like industrial factories, some are considered to be shoddy or dull buildings, although others are known for their magnificent architecture such as Collins Barracks in Dublin and others in Paris, Berlin, Madrid, Vienna, or London. From the rough barracks of 19th-century conscript armies, filled with hazing and illness and barely differentiated from the livestock pens that housed the draft animals, to the clean and Internet-connected barracks of modern all-volunteer militaries, the word can have a variety of connotations.

== History ==
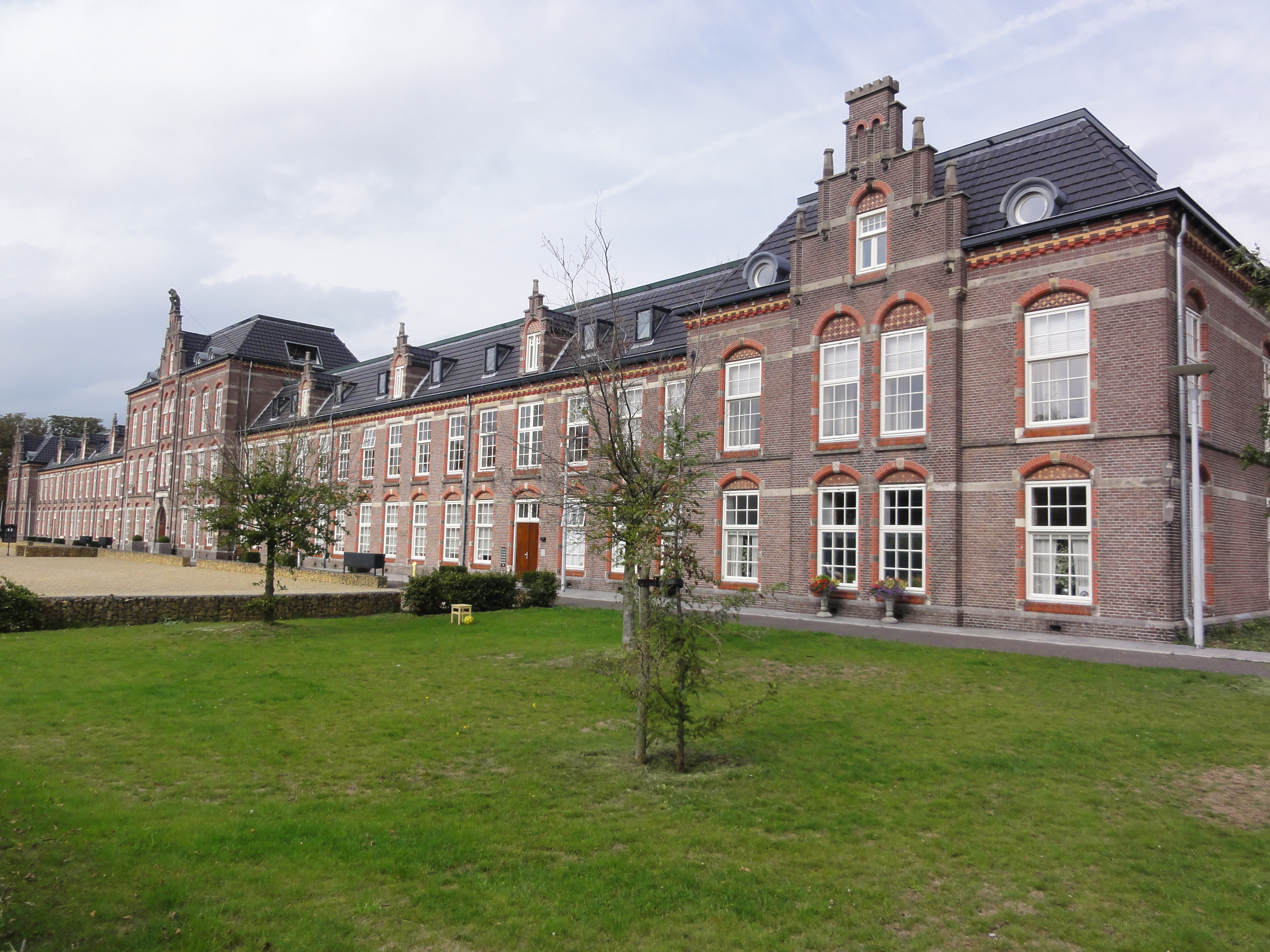
Barracks in Nijmegen, the Netherlands.

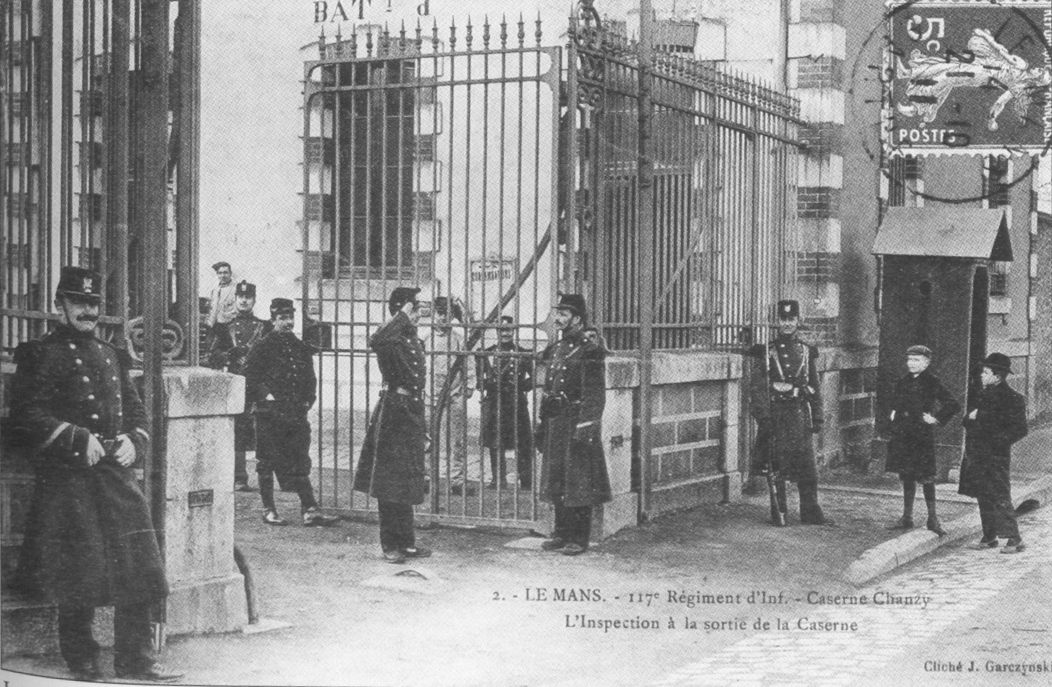
Barracks of the 117th infantry regiment in Le Mans, France (c. 1900).

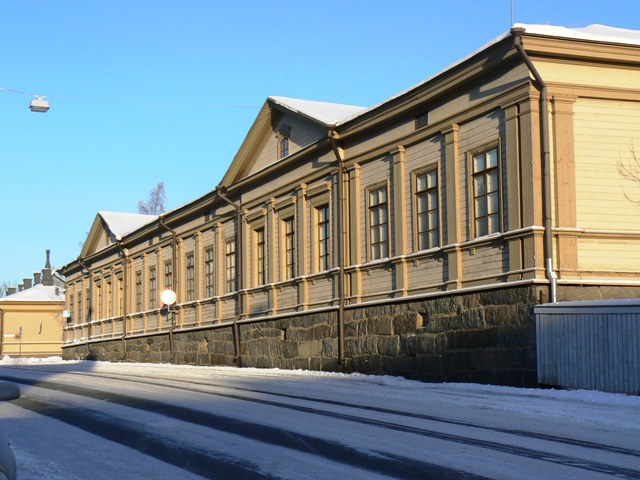
The Russian-period barracks in Vaasa, Ostrobothnia, Finland

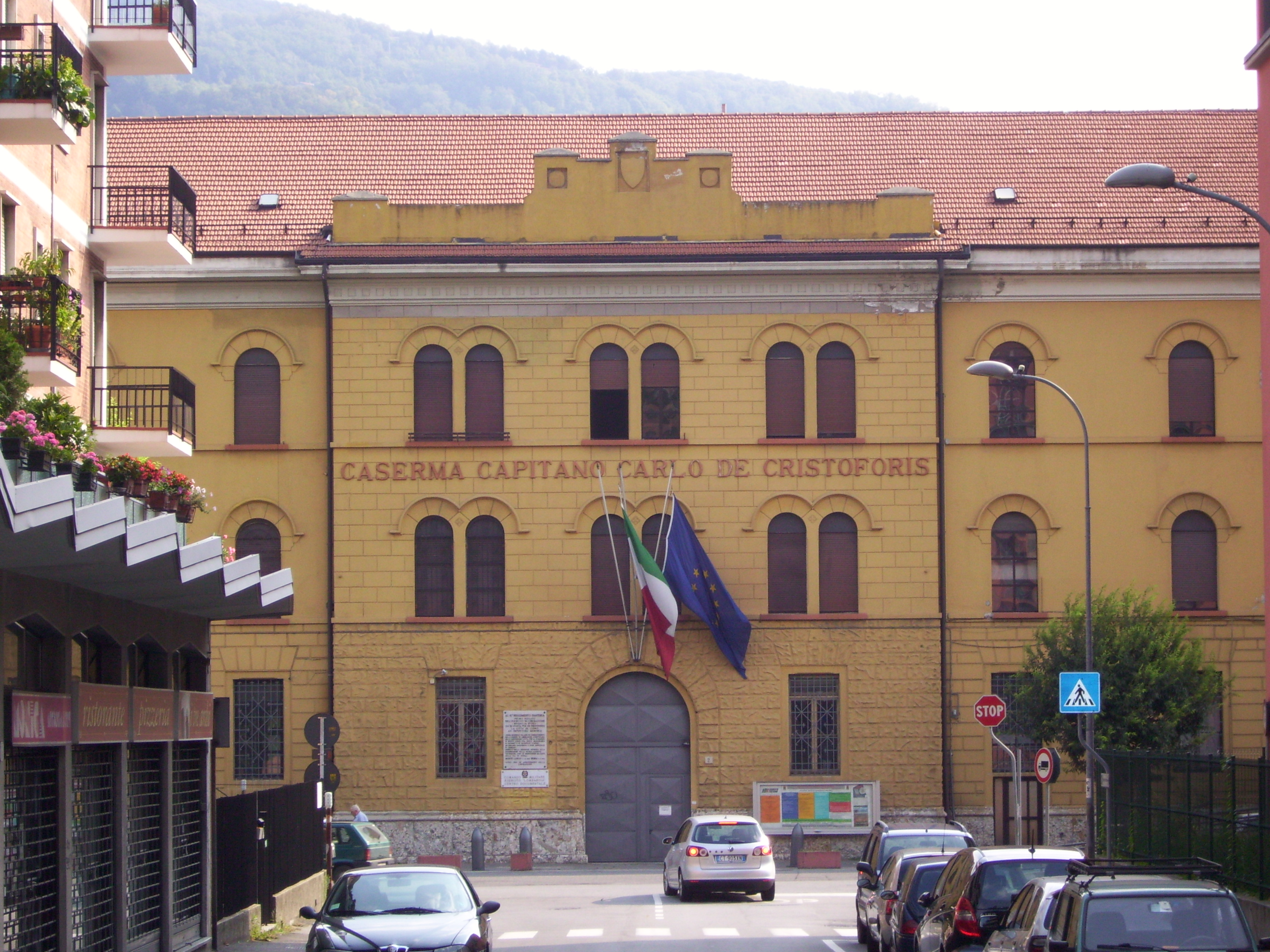
Carlo De Cristoforis Barracks in Como

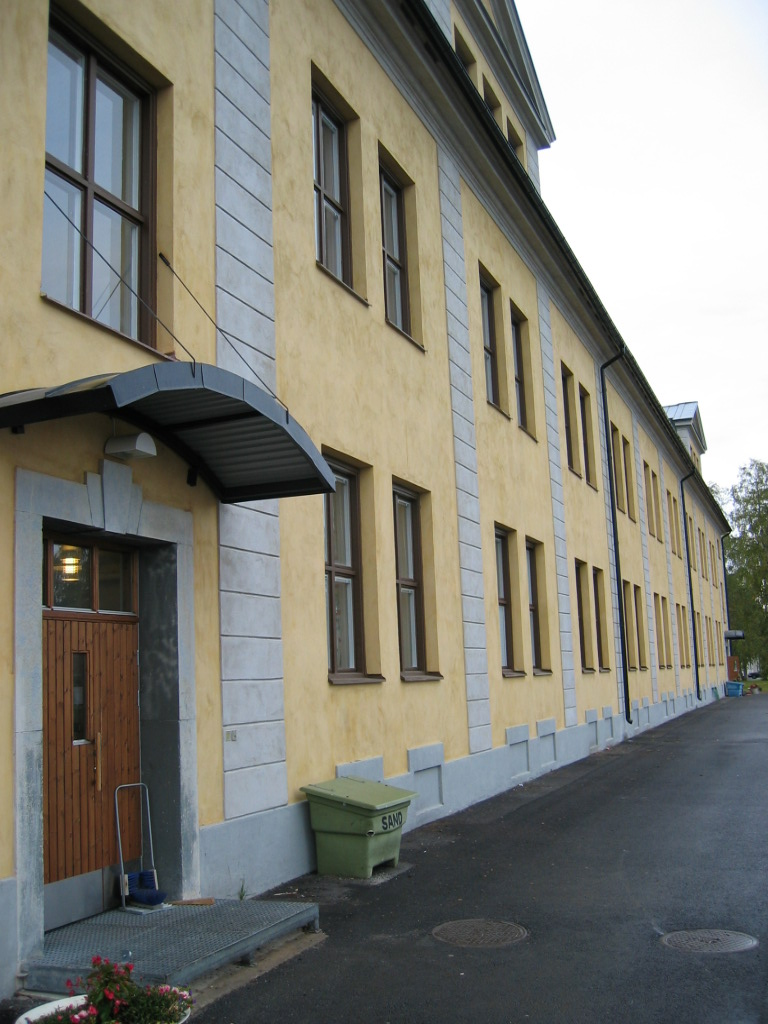
Barracks housing conscripts of Norrbotten Regiment in Boden, Sweden.

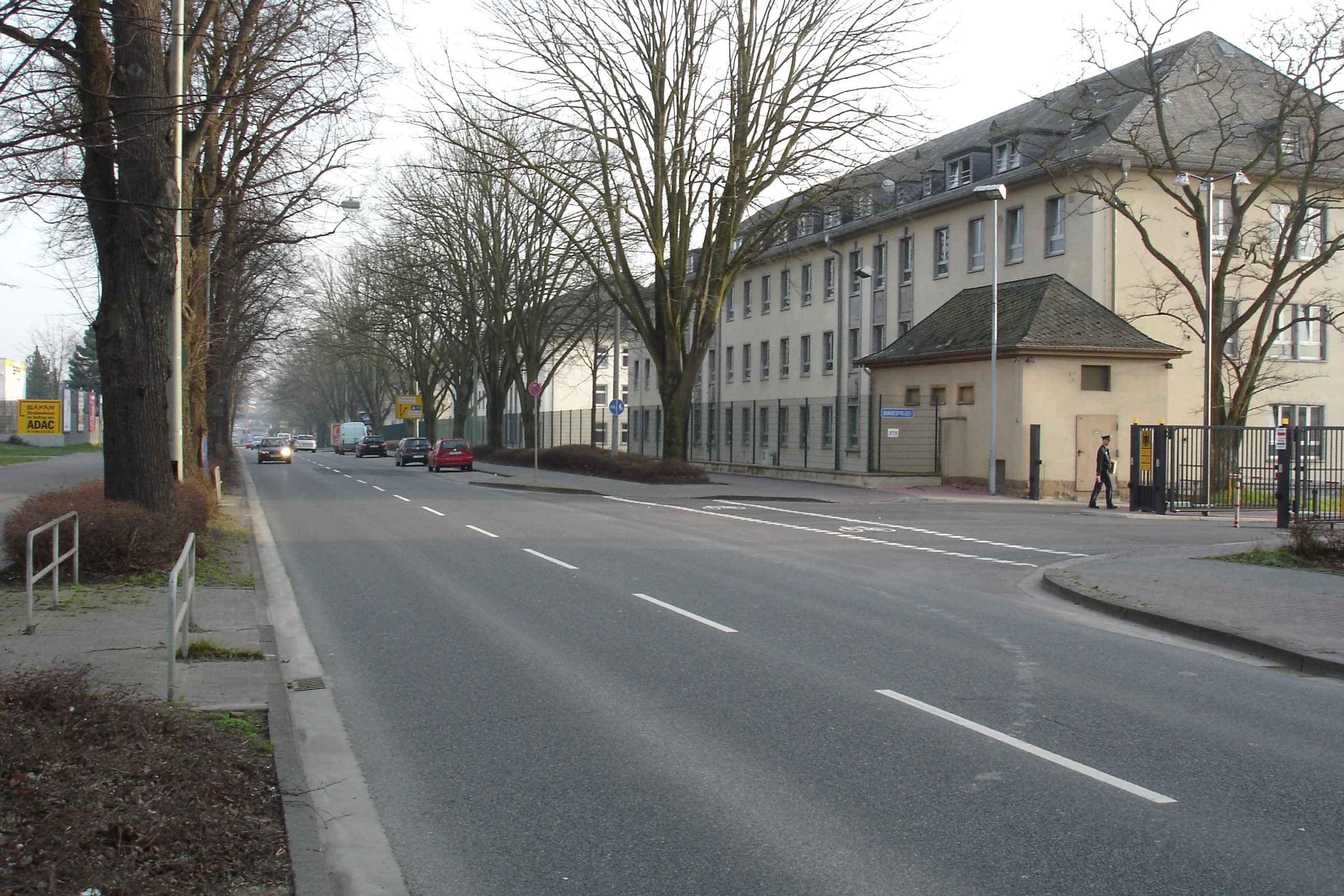
German barracks for troops of Bundespolizei (federal police) in Frankfurt, Germany.

Early barracks such as those of the Roman Praetorian Guard were built to maintain elite forces. There are a number of remains of Roman army barracks in frontier forts such as Vercovicium and Vindolanda. From these and from contemporary Roman sources we can see that the basics of life in a military camp have remained constant for thousands of years. In the Early Modern Period, they formed part of the Military Revolution that scholars believe contributed decisively to the formation of the nation state by increasing the expense of maintaining standing armies. Large, permanent barracks were developed in the 18th century by the two dominant states of the period, France the "caserne" and Spain the "cuartel". The English term 'barrack', on the other hand, derives from the Spanish word for a temporary shelter erected by soldiers on campaign, barraca; (because of fears that a standing army in barracks would be a threat to the constitution, barracks were not generally built in Great Britain until 1790, on the eve of the Napoleonic Wars).

Early barracks were multi-story blocks, often grouped in a quadrangle around a courtyard or parade ground. A good example is Berwick Barracks, which was among the first in England to be purpose-built and begun in 1717 to the design of the distinguished architect Nicholas Hawksmoor. During the 18th century, the increasing sophistication of military life led to separate housing for different ranks (officers always had larger rooms) and married quarters; as well as the provision of specialized buildings such as dining rooms and cook houses, bath houses, mess rooms, schools, hospitals, armories, gymnasia, riding schools and stables. The pavilion plan concept of hospital design was influential in barrack planning after the Crimean War.

The first large-scale training camps were built in the Kingdom of France and the Holy Roman Empire (Germany) during the early 18th century. The British Army built Aldershot camps from 1854.

By the First World War, infantry, artillery, and cavalry regiments had separate barracks. The first naval barracks were hulks, old wooden sailing vessels; but these insanitary lodgings were replaced with large naval barracks at the major dockyard towns of Europe and the United States, usually with hammocks instead of beds.

These were inadequate for the enormous armies mobilized after 1914. Hut camps were developed using variations of the eponymous Nissen hut, made from timber or corrugated iron.

== Military ==
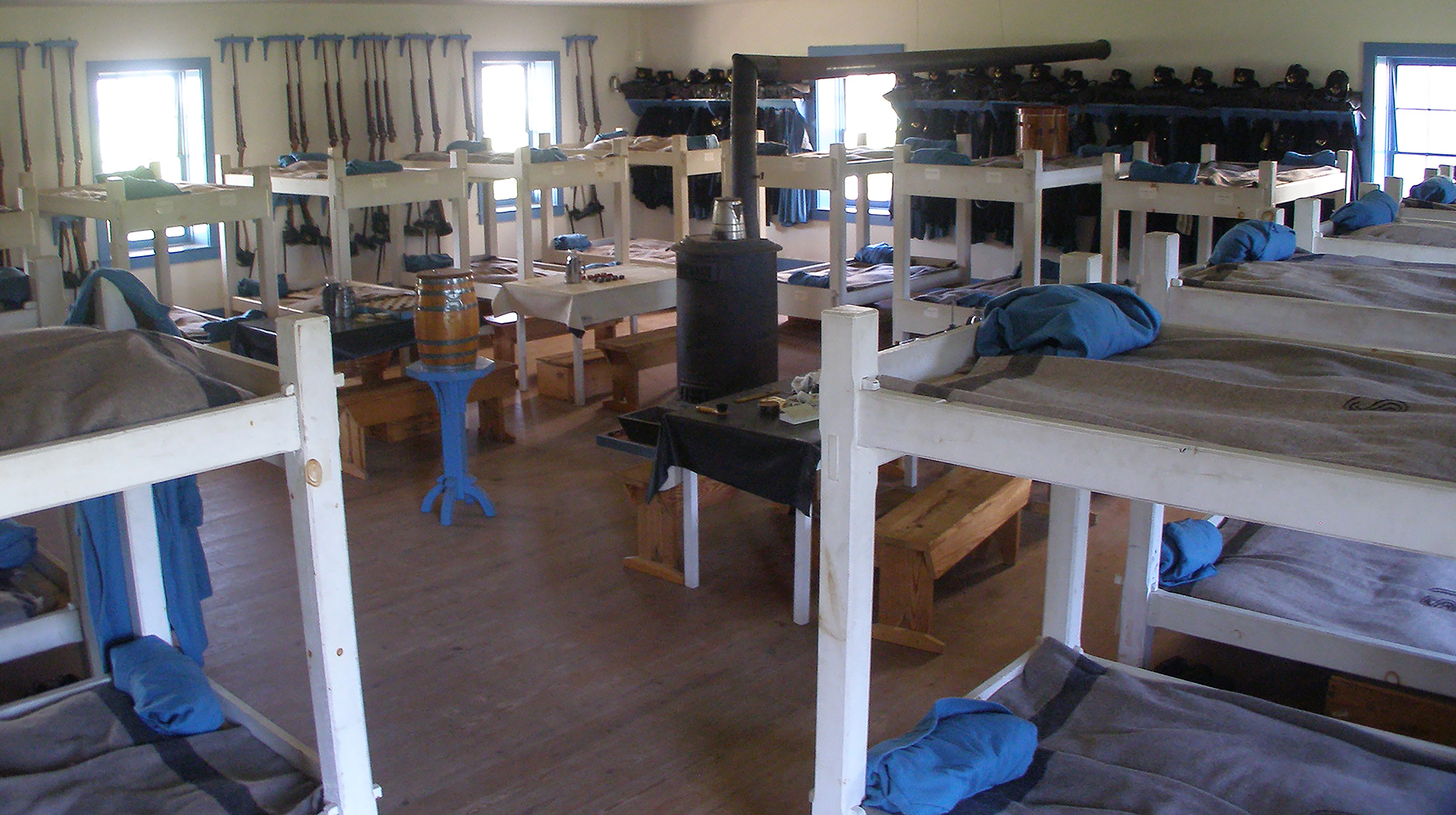
Many barracks contain large numbers of beds or bunk beds with minimal common areas

In many military forces, both NCO and SNCO personnel will frequently be housed in barracks for service or training. Officers are often charged with ensuring the barracks and personnel are maintained in an orderly fashion. Junior enlisted and sometimes junior NCOs will often receive less space and may be housed in bays, while senior NCOs and officers may share or have their own room. Junior enlisted personnel are typically tasked with the cleanliness of the barracks. The term "Garrison town" is a common expression for any town that has military barracks, i.e., a permanent military presence nearby.

=== Prison ===
Prison cell blocks often are built and arranged like barracks, and some military prisons may have barracks in their name, such as the United States Disciplinary Barracks of Leavenworth.

== Worldwide ==
=== Canada ===
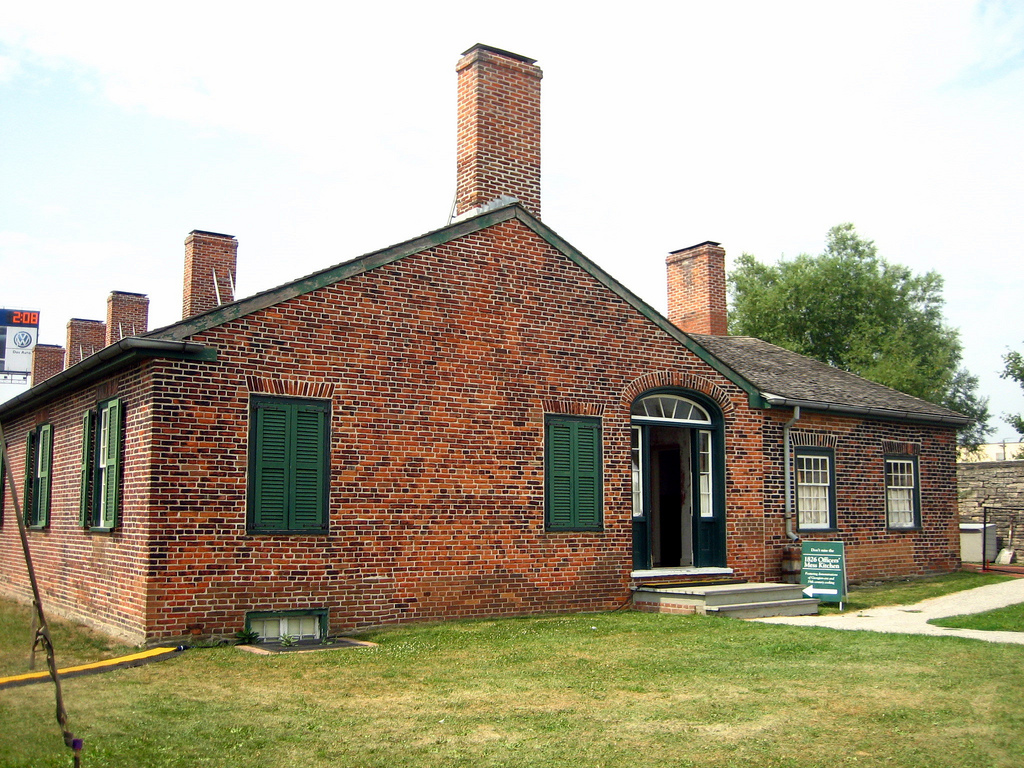
The officers' barracks and mess establishment at Fort York, Toronto, built in 1815 after the original 1793 fort was destroyed by American soldiers during the War of 1812.

Barracks were used to house troops in forts during the Upper Canadian period. Leading up to and during the War of 1812, Lieutenant-Governor John Graves Simcoe and Major-General Isaac Brock oversaw the construction of Fort York on the shores of Lake Ontario in present-day Toronto. There are several surviving British Army barracks built between 1814 and 1815 at that site today. Multiple limestone barracks were built half a mile west of Fort York in 1840, only one of which survives. The British Army handed over "New Fort York", as the second fort was called, to the Canadian Militia in 1870 after Confederation.

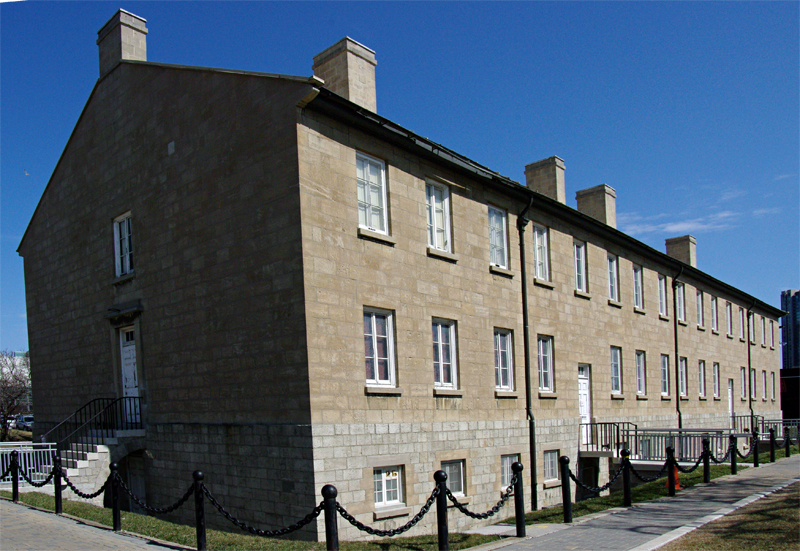
Officers' barracks at New Fort York made of Queenston limestone (1840), the site's only surviving structure.

The Stone Frigate, completed in 1820, served as barracks briefly in 1837–38, and was refitted as a dormitory and classrooms to house the Royal Military College of Canada by 1876. The Stone frigate is a large stone building originally designed to hold gear and rigging from British warships dismantled to comply with the Rush–Bagot Treaty.

=== Poland ===
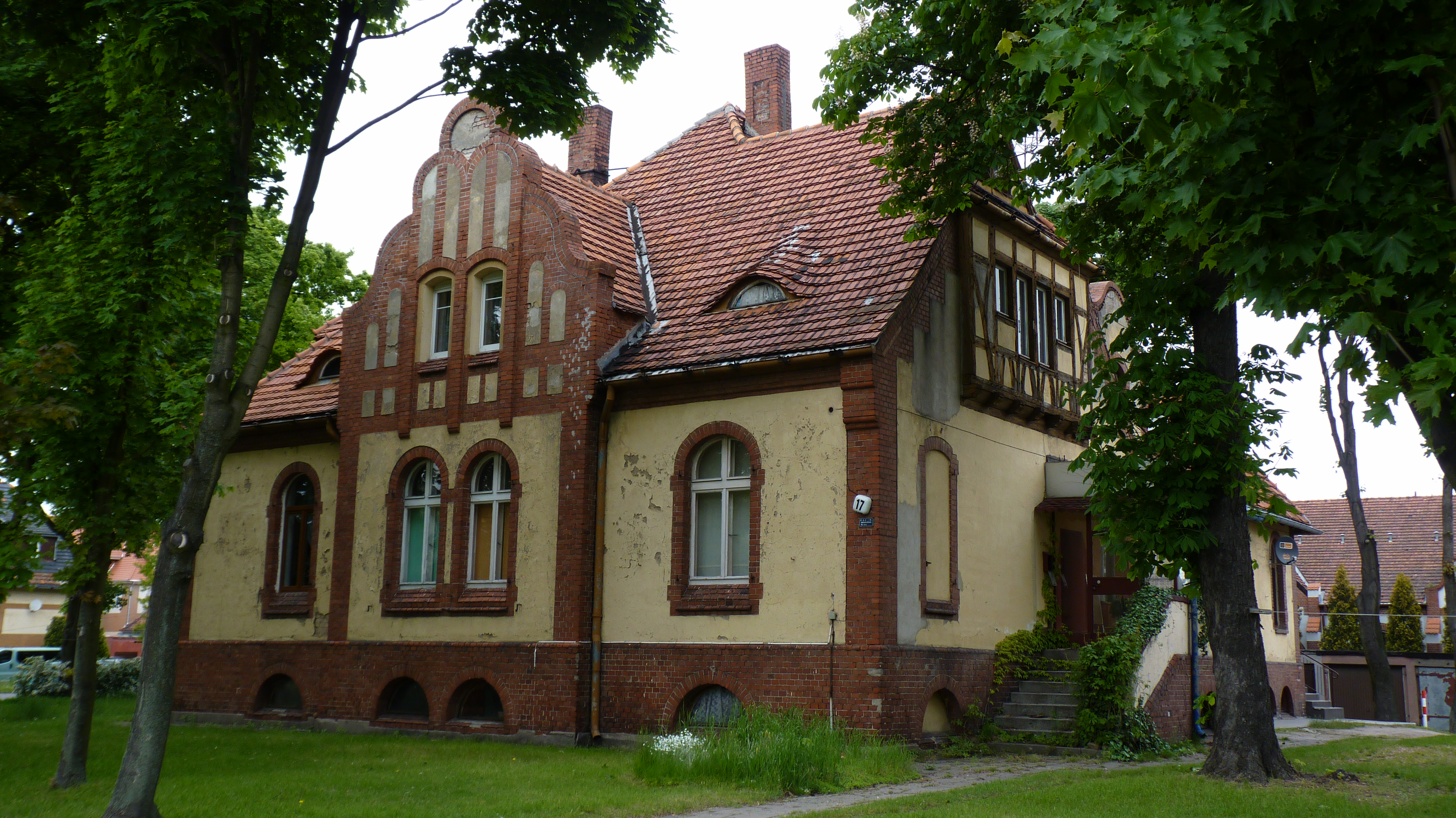
Old barracks building in Września

In Poland barracks are represented usually as a complex of buildings, each consisting of a separate entity or an administrative or business premises. As an example, the Barracks Complex in Września.

=== Portugal ===
Each of the Portuguese Army bases is referred as a quartel (barracks). In a barracks, each of the dormitory buildings is referred as a caserna (casern). Most of them are regimental barracks, constituting the fixed component of the Army system of forces and being responsible for the training, sustenance and general support to the Army. In addition to the regimental administrative, logistic and training bodies, each barracks can lodge one or more operational units (operational battalions, independent companies or equivalent units). Although there are housing blocks within the perimeter of some regimental barracks, the Portuguese usual practice is for the members of the Armed Forces to live outside the military bases with their families, inserted in the local civilian communities.

Many of the Portuguese regimental barracks are of a model developed by the old Administrative Commission for the New Infrastructures of the Armed Forces (CANIFA). Because of this, they are commonly referred as "CANIFA type barracks". These types of barracks were built in the 1950s and 1960s, following a standardized architectural model, usually with an area of between 100,000 and 200,000 square metres, including a headquarters building, a guard house, a general mess building, an infirmary building, a workshop and garage building, an officer house building, a sergeant house building, three to ten rank and file caserns, fire ranges and sports facilities. In average each CANIFA type barracks was intended to lodge around 1000 soldiers and their respective armament, vehicles and other equipment.

=== Russia ===
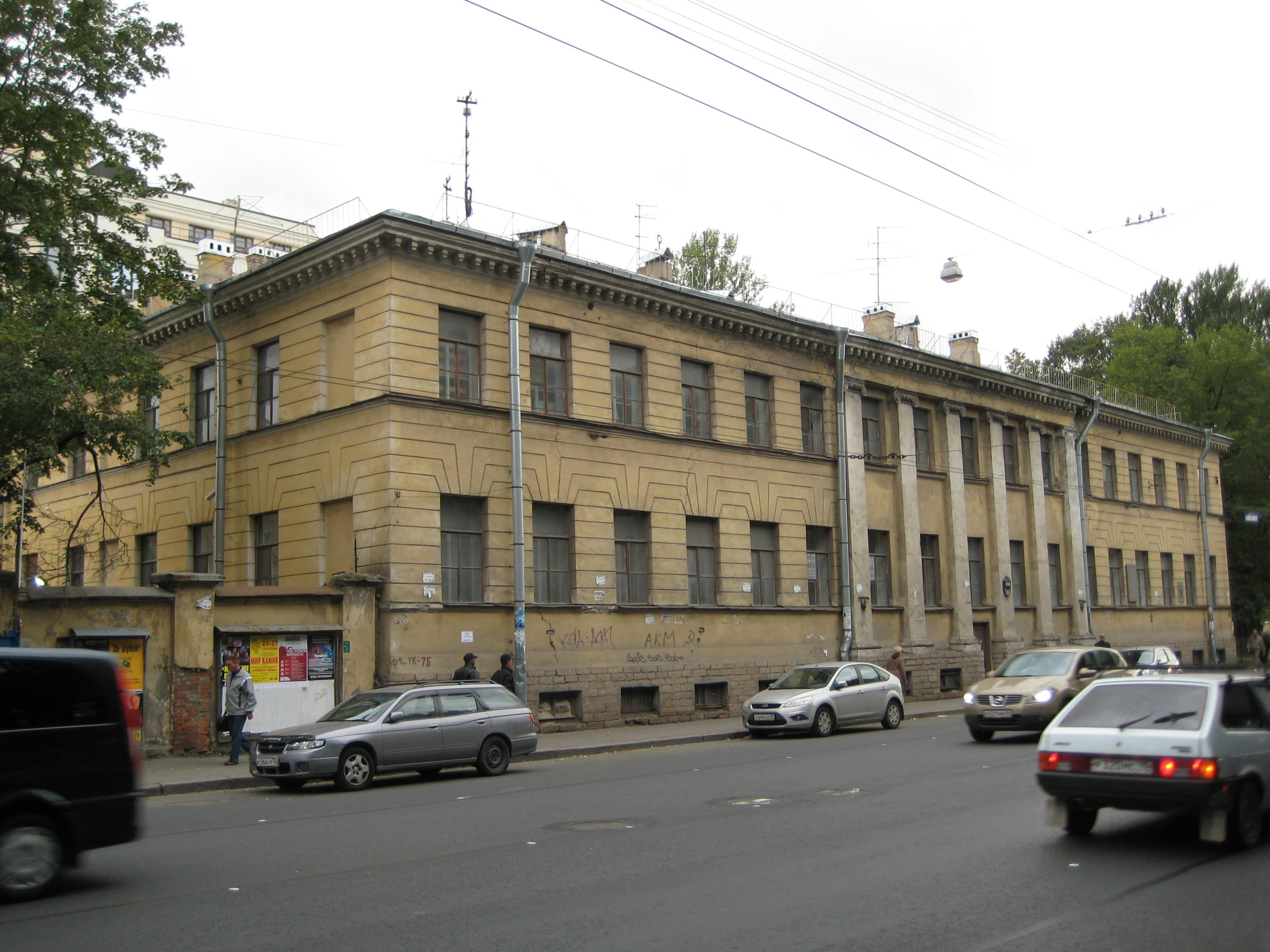
The Preobrazhensky Life Guards Regiment barracks in Saint Petersburg

Until the end of the 18th century personnel of the Imperial Russian Army were billeted with civilians homes or accommodated in slobodas in a countryside. The first barracks were built during the reign of Emperor Paul I. For these purposes, Paul I established a one-time land tax based on the amount of land owned by citizen. This tax was not mandatory, but person who paid it was permanently exempted from billets.

He considered as unquestionably harmful for the combat development of the soldier not only a constant participation in the home life of civilians, caused by the billet system, — Paul believed that even an accommodation in the slobodas, which did not cut soldier off from a household concerns and chores, is unsuited to the formation of a proper combat army. Emperor Paul understood that the organization of military accommodations has its own task not only to provide a soldier with a house, but also to adapt him to the purpose and conditions of life of the soldier. Only a barracks cohabitation, concentrated in more or less significant masses, seemed to Paul the only purposeful approach for the development and maintenance of the military spirit and discipline, for the study of the soldier's personality and qualities, for the convenience of training and military exercises. Barrack is not only the home of a soldier, but also the school where he is brought up. This idea was fully grasped by Paul, and the construction of barracks for the army everywhere became his main objective, to the achievement of which he put all his strength, all his energy.

— Nikolay Lyapidevsky, History of barracks accommodation of troops in Russia (Engineering journal, 1882)

From the end of 1882, the money collected for exemption from billet was transferred to the military ministry. This has made it possible to step up the construction of barracks for the army. By 1 January 1900, 19,015 barracks had been built, which accommodated 94% of the troops.

=== United Kingdom ===
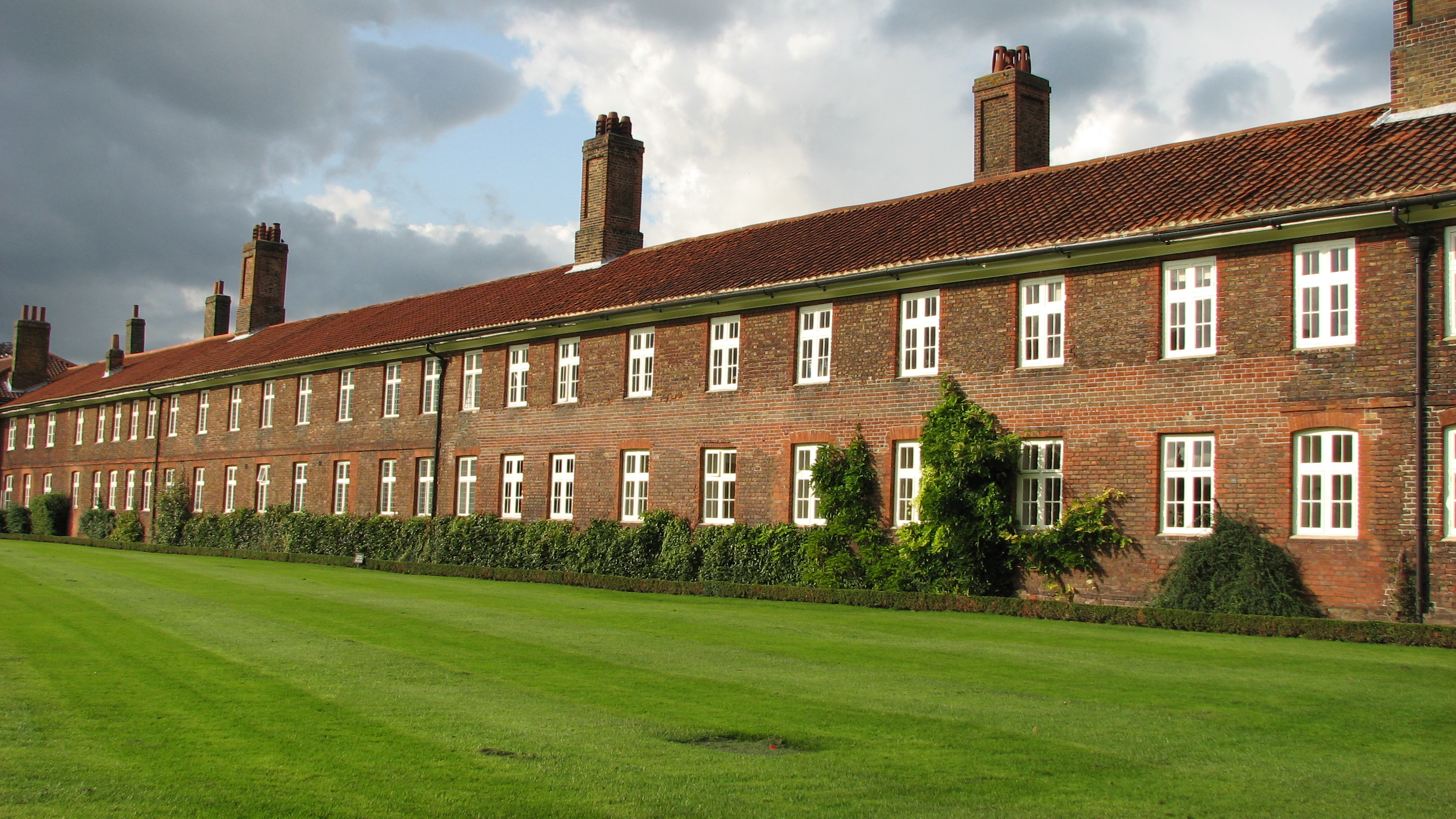
Barracks at Hampton Court Palace (1689), Greater London; these are Britain's oldest surviving purpose-built barracks.

In the 17th and 18th centuries there were concerns around the idea of a standing army housed in barracks; instead, the law provided for troops routinely to be billeted in small groups in inns and other locations. (The concerns were various: political, ideological and constitutional, provoked by memories of Cromwell's New Model Army and of the use of troops in reign of James II to intimidate areas of civil society. Furthermore, grand urban barracks were associated with absolutist monarchies, where they could be seen as emblematic of power sustained through military might; and there was an ongoing suspicion that gathering soldiers together in barracks might encourage sedition.)

Nevertheless, some "soldiers' lodgings" were built in Britain at this time, usually attached to coastal fortifications or royal palaces. The first recorded use of the word 'barracks' in this context was for the Irish Barracks, built in the precinct of the Tower of London in 1669. At the Ordnance Office (responsible for construction and upkeep of barracks) Bernard de Gomme played a key role in developing a 'domestic' style of barrack design in the latter half of the 17th century: he provided barrack blocks for such locations as Plymouth Citadel and Tilbury Fort, each with rows of square rooms arranged in pairs on two stories, accommodating a Company of some sixty men, four to a room, two to a bed. Standard furnishings were provided, and each room had a grate used for heating and cooking.

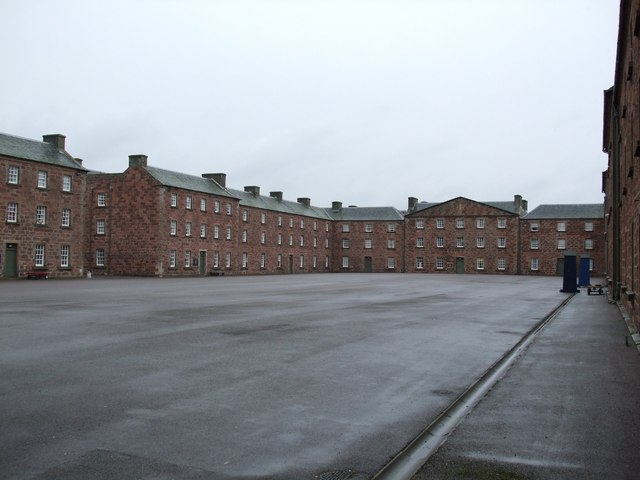
Fort George barracks, 1753

In England, this domestic style continued to be used through the first half of the eighteenth century; most new barracks of this period were more or less hidden within the precincts of medieval castles and Henrician forts. In Scotland, however, a more demonstrative style was employed following the Jacobite rising of 1715 (as at Ruthven Barracks) and that of 1745 (as seen in the monumental Fort George). This bolder approach gradually began to be adopted south of the border during the eighteenth century (beginning with nearby Berwick, 1717). There was much building in and around the Royal Dockyards at this time: during the Seven Years' War, fears of a land attack led to defensive 'lines' being built around the dockyard towns, and infantry barracks were established within them (e.g. at Chatham, Upper and Lower Barracks, 1756, and Plymouth, six defensible square barracks, 1758–63). The newly constituted Royal Marines were also provided with accommodation in the vicinity of the Dockyards (e.g. Stonehouse Barracks, 1779) becoming the first Corps in Britain to be fully provided with its own accommodation. Large urban barracks were still a rarity, though. In London there was a fair amount of barrack accommodation, but most of it was within the precincts of various royal palaces (as at Horse Guards, 1753). The prominent Royal Artillery Barracks in Woolwich (1776) was one exception (but significantly the Artillery were under the command of the Board of Ordnance rather than of the Army).

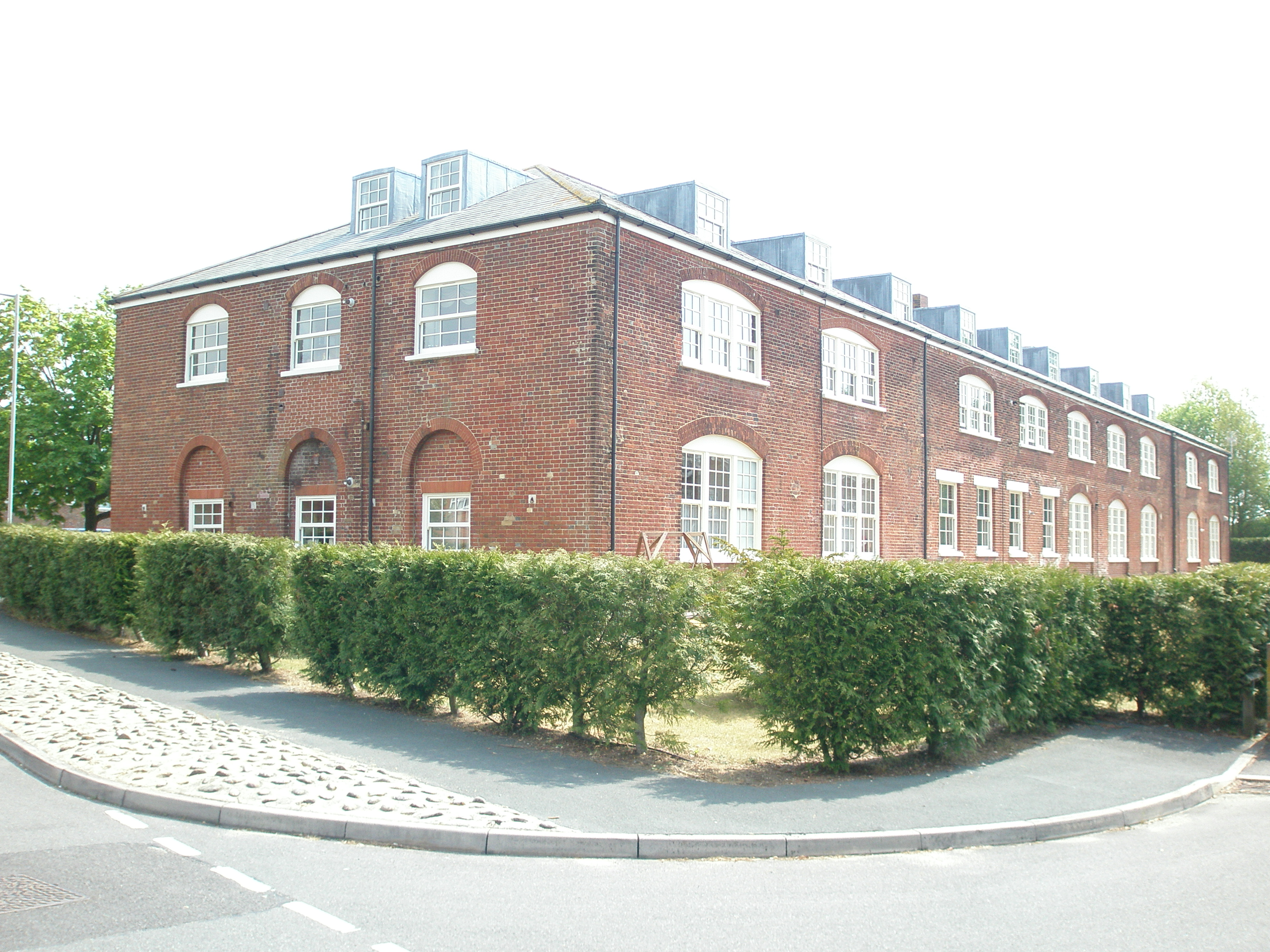
The former cavalry barracks in Christchurch, Dorset (1795): officers' accommodation in the end blocks, ground-floor stables with men's accommodation over.

In the aftermath of the French Revolution, though, things changed. The size of the army grew from 40,000 to 225,000 between 1790 and 1814 (with the Militia adding a further 100,000). Barrack accommodation at the time was provided for a mere 20,000. To deal with the situation, responsibility for building barracks was transferred in 1792 from the Board of Ordnance to a specialist Barracks Department overseen by the War Office. With a view to dealing with sedition, and perhaps quelling thoughts of revolution, several large cavalry barracks were built in the 1790s: first at Knightsbridge (close to the royal palaces), then in several provincial towns and cities: Birmingham, Coventry, Manchester, Norwich, Nottingham and Sheffield (as well as Hounslow Barracks just west of London). Several smaller cavalry and artillery barracks were established around this time, but very little was built for the infantry; instead, a number of large camps (with wooden huts) were set up, including at Chelmsford, Colchester and Sunderland, as well as at various locations along the south coast. Barrack-masters were appointed, one such was Captain George Manby at the Royal Barracks, Great Yarmouth. Coincidentally his father, Captain Matthew Manby, had been barrack-master at Limerick.

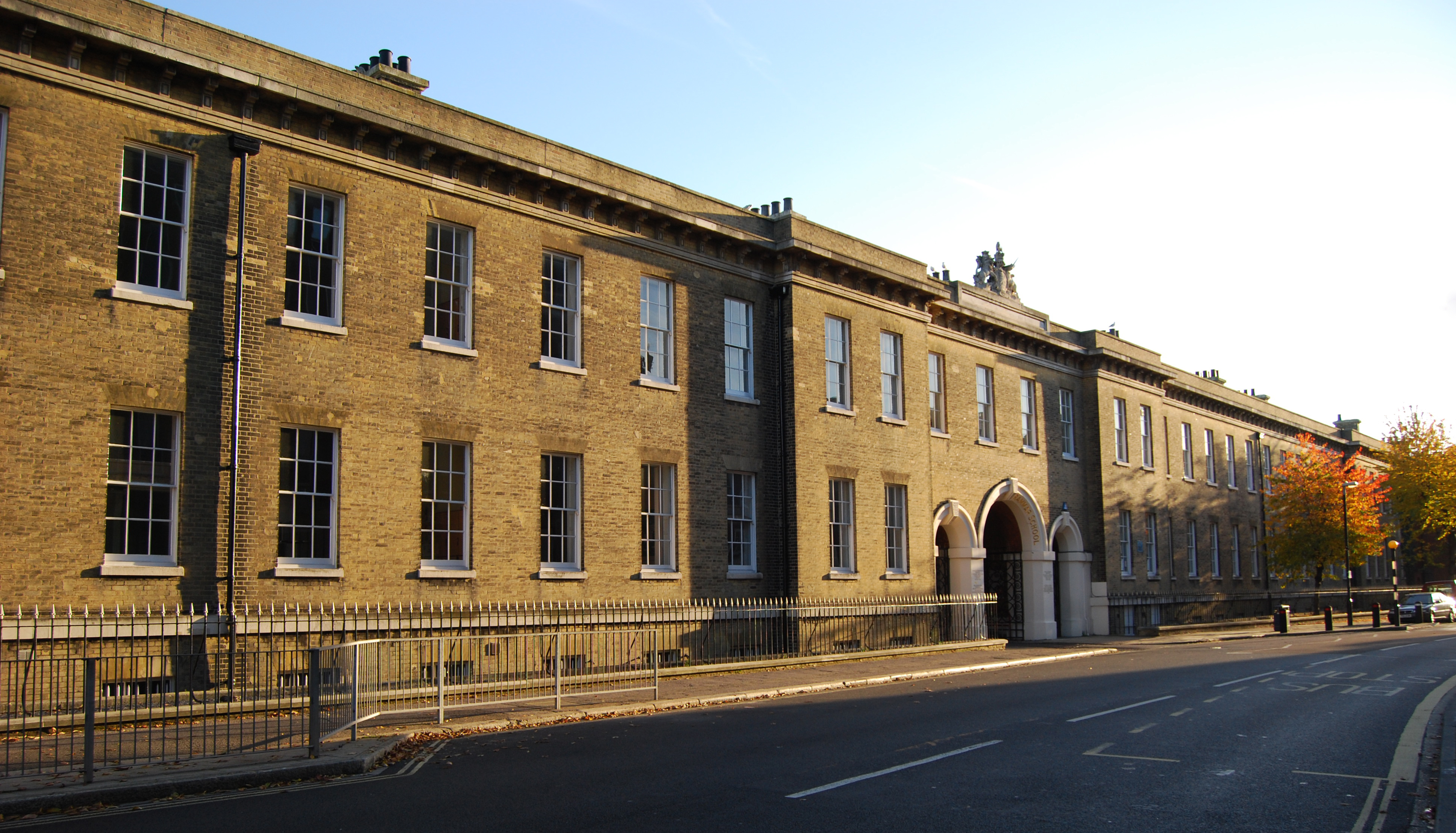
Officers' accommodation at the former Cambridge Infantry Barracks in Portsmouth (1820s).

It was not until some years after the end of the Napoleonic Wars (and post-war recession) that barrack-building began again. John Nash built four as part of his London improvements: Regent's Park and St John's Wood for the Cavalry, Wellington Barracks for the Guards, and St George's Barracks (since demolished) behind the National Gallery. In several instances elsewhere, buildings were converted rather than newly built (or a mixture of the two, as at Cambridge Barracks, Portsmouth where a new frontage, housing officers, was built in front of a range of warehouses converted to house the men). In response to the Chartist riots three barracks were established in north-west England in the 1840s, Ladysmith Barracks at Ashton-under-Lyne, Wellington Barracks at Bury and Fulwood Barracks at Preston.

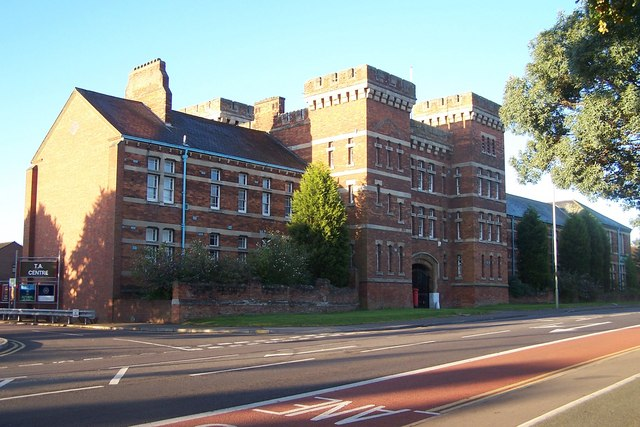
Kempston Barracks was built to serve as depot for the Bedfordshire Regiment in 1875 (one of a number of similar barracks established following the Cardwell reforms)

A review conducted following the demise of the Board of Ordnance in 1855 noted that only seven barracks outside London had accommodation for more than 1,000. This changed with the establishment of large-scale Army Camps such as Aldershot (1854), and the expansion of Garrison towns such as Colchester; over time in these locations temporary huts were replaced with more permanent barracks buildings. Large-scale camps were not the only way forward, however; from the 1870s, the localisation agenda of the Cardwell Reforms saw new and old barracks established as depots for regional or County brigades and regiments. The latter part of the 19th century also saw the establishment of a number of Naval barracks (an innovation long resisted by the Royal Navy, which had tended to accommodate its sailors afloat either on their ships or else in hulks moored in its harbours). The first of these, Keyham Barracks in Devonport (later HMS Drake), was begun in 1879, and only completed in 1907.

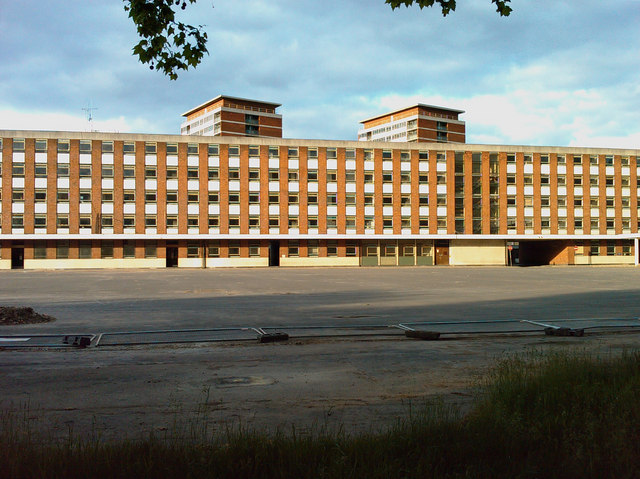
Chelsea Barracks, as rebuilt in the 1960s (since demolished).

During the 20th century, activity ranged from the need for speedy expansion during the First World War (when large camps such as Catterick were established), to the closure of many barracks in the interwar period. Many of those that remained were rebuilt in the 1960s, either substantially (as happened at Woolwich, behind the facade) or entirely (as at Hyde Park and at Chelsea – built 1863, demolished and rebuilt 1963, closed 2008). There has been an ongoing focus on improving the quality of barracks accommodation; since the 1970s several former RAF bases have been converted to serve as Army barracks, in place of some of the more cramped urban sites. Today, generally, only single and unmarried personnel or those who choose not to move their families nearby live in barracks. Most British military barracks are named after battles, military figures or the locality.

=== United States ===
In basic training, and sometimes follow-on training, service members live in barracks. Formerly, the U.S. Marine Corps had gender-separate basic training units. Currently, all services have training where male and female recruits share barracks, but are separated during personal time and lights out. All the services integrate male and female members following boot camp and first assignment.

After training, unmarried junior enlisted members will typically reside in barracks. During unaccompanied, dependent-restricted assignments, non-commissioned and commissioned officer ranks may also be required to live in barracks. Amenities in these barracks increase with the rank of the occupant.

Unlike the other services, the U.S. Air Force officially uses the term "dormitory" to refer to its unaccompanied housing.

During World War II, many U.S. barracks were made of inexpensive, sturdy and easy to assemble Quonset huts that resembled Native American long houses (having a rounded roof but made out of metal).

== See also ==
- Cantonment, a temporary or semi-permanent military quarters.
- B hut
- Barkas, Hyderabad
