= Cuneus Frisionum =

Roman auxiliary unit

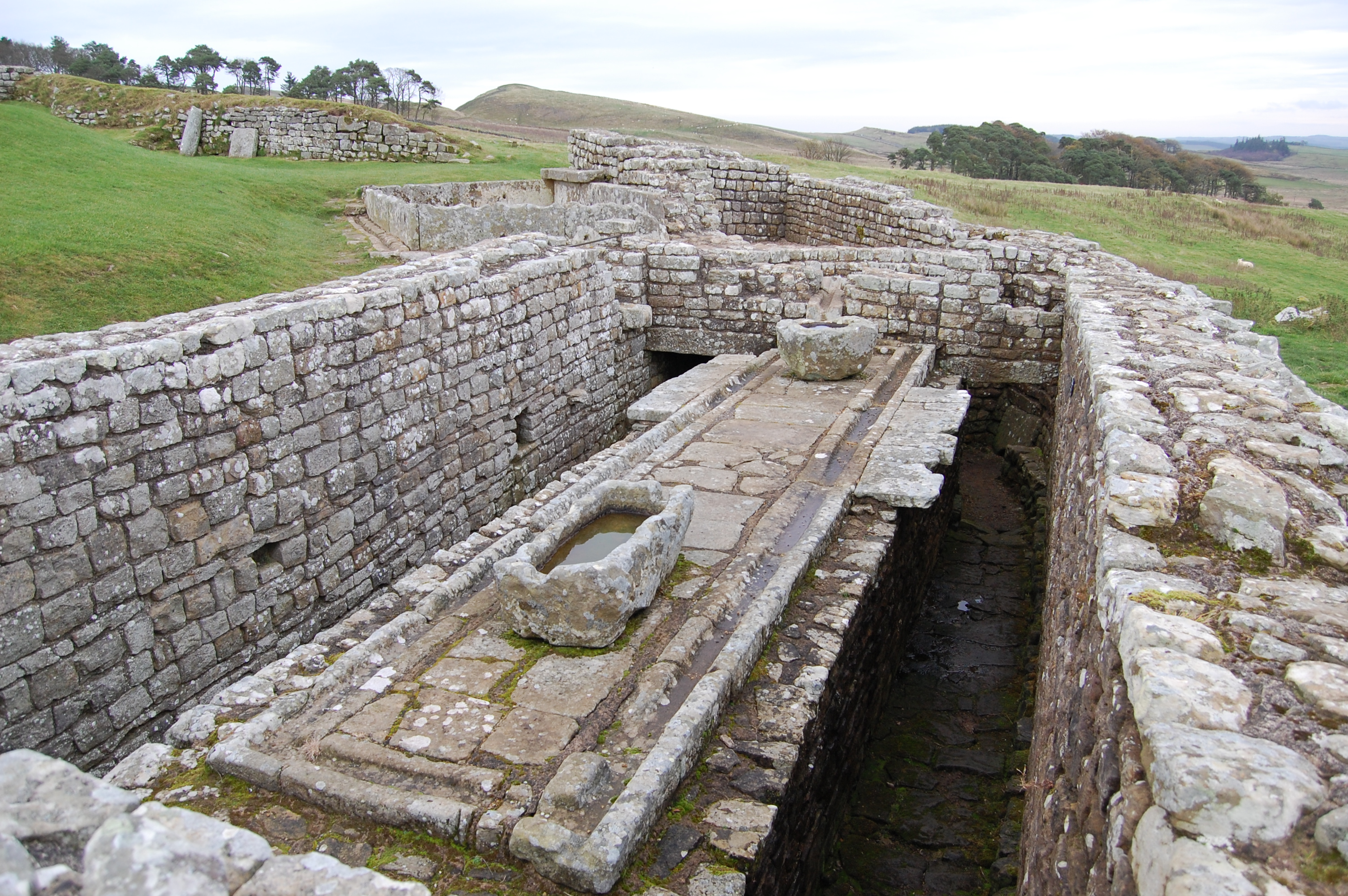

Cuneus Frisionum or Frisiorum cuneus are the names of units of Frisian auxiliaries in the Roman army.

Two memorial stones in Housesteads, Hexham, England mention the name. They were engraved by soldiers from Twente (Tuihanti) in the 3rd century between 222 and 235, and are dedicated to Mars Thingsus. They were discovered in 1883. One is from a pillar shaped altar and the other from a smaller altar; they are engraved in badly written Latin:

DEO MARTI ET DVABVS ALAISIAGIS ET N AVG GER CIVES TVIHANTI CVNEI FRISIORVM VER SER ALEXANDRIANI VOTVM SOLVERVNT LIBENTES M

and:

DEO MARTI THINCSO DVABVS ET ALAISAGIS BEDE ET FIMMILENE ET N AVG GERM CIVES TVIHANTI VSLM

They mean "To the god Mars and the two Alaisiagae, and to the divine power of the Emperor, the Germanic tribesmen of Tuihantis of the formation of Frisians of Vercovicium, Severus Alexanders's own, willingly and deservedly fulfilled their vow." and "To the god Mars Thincsus and the two Alaisiagae, Beda and Fimmilena, and the divine power of the Emperor, Germanic tribesmen from Tuihantis willingly and deservedly fulfilled their vow."

There are various possible explanations as to why the Tvihanti would be referred to as Frisians, as they were a separate tribe. They may have considered themselves to be Frisian affiliates, they were hired by Frisians on this mission, or, as it is likely that the Tuihanti themselves were illiterate and hired a Roman engraver, the engraver likened them to Frisians.
