= St George's Barracks, London =

St George's Barracks
- London
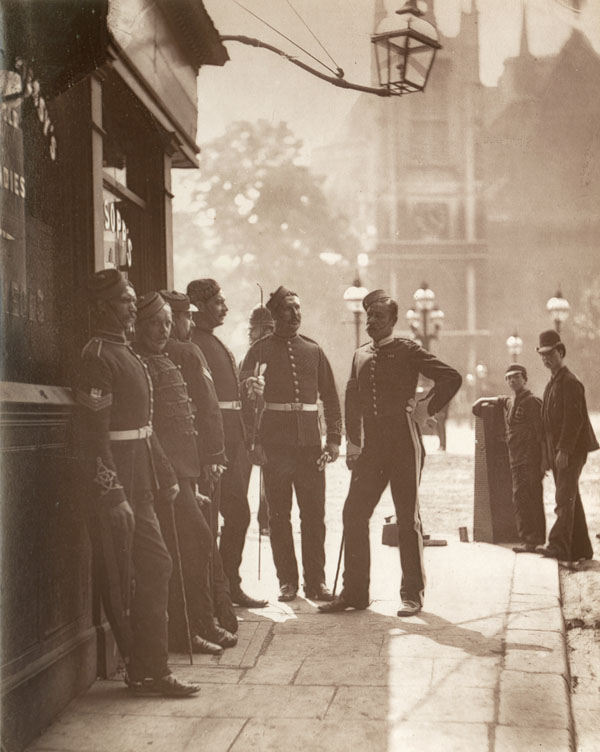
- Recruiting Sergeants from St George's Barracks

Site information
- Type: Barracks
- Owner: War Office
- Operator: British Army

Location
- Location within London
- Coordinates: 51.50939°N 0.12839°W

Site history
- Built: 1826
- Built for: War Office
- In use: 1826–1911

St George's Barracks was a military installation in Orange Street, behind the National Gallery, in London.

== History ==
The barracks, which were designed by John Nash and built as the main recruiting depot for the London area, were completed in 1826. Recruiting sergeants for the regiments based at the barracks tended to operate within a tight area defined by St. George's Barracks, Trafalgar Square and Westminster Abbey. The barracks, which were also used as facilities to accommodate regiments of foot guards, were retained into the 20th century because of the need for troops to be at hand to quell disturbances in Trafalgar Square. They were ultimately demolished in 1911 and the site is now occupied by the National Portrait Gallery.

== Sources ==
- Conlin, Jonathan (2006). The Nation's Mantelpiece: A History of the National Gallery. London: Pallas Athene. ISBN 978-1843680208.
