= Milecastle 36 =

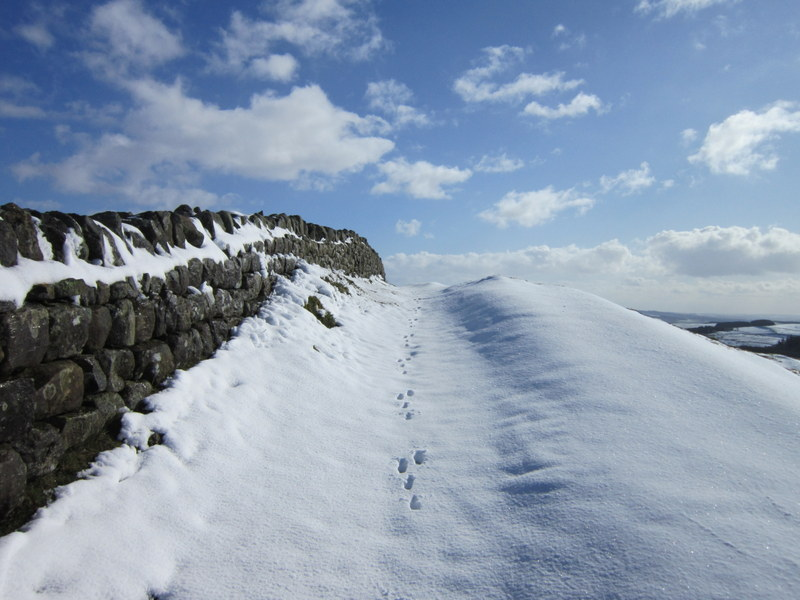
- The summit of King's Hill near the site of Milecastle 36

- Location within Northumberland
- 55.017963°N 2.318619°W
- Type: Milecastle
- Location: Northumberland, England

Milecastle 36 (King's Hill) was one of the milecastles on Hadrian's Wall (grid reference NY79726931). There is little to see on the ground as most of the walls have been robbed and quarried away.

== Description ==
The site of Milecastle 36 is located on King's Hill, 800 metres northeast of Housesteads Roman Fort.

The milecastle was robbed of most of its remaining stone in 1831. Part of the east and west walls are indicated by robber-trenches. The remainder of the milecastle has been destroyed by surface quarrying, and the featureless interior is overlain by Wall tumble.

== Excavations ==
Milecastle 36 was excavated in 1946. It was found to have a long axis and narrow walls. The excavations revealed that in the post-Hadrianic period the south gate was destroyed and the north gate was reconstructed and then blocked.

== Associated turrets ==
Each milecastle on Hadrian's Wall had two associated turret structures. These turrets were positioned approximately one-third and two-thirds of a Roman mile to the west of the Milecastle, and would probably have been manned by part of the nearest milecastle's garrison. The turrets associated with Milecastle 36 are known as Turret 36A and Turret 36B.

=== Turret 36A ===
Turret 36A (Kennel Crags) (grid reference NY79316915) is visible only as a slight earthen platform. The turret was located in 1911 and excavated in 1946. It was found to have narrow walls and a door to the east. It appears to have been put out of commission before the end of the Roman period.

=== Turret 36B ===
Turret 36B (Housesteads) (grid reference NY78966884) lies within Housesteads Roman Fort. It was demolished when the fort was built, and overlain with buildings. The foundations of the turret survive, and the walls have been excavated and consolidated, standing to a maximum height of 0.7 metres.

== Monument records ==
Monument	Monument Number	English Heritage Archive Number
Milecastle 36	15137	NY 76 NE 2
Turret 36A	15140	NY 76 NE 3
Turret 36B	15143	NY 76 NE 4

== Public access ==
The milecastle, and site of Turret 36A, are both accessible via the Hadrian's Wall Path. The excavated foundations of Turret 36B are within Housesteads Fort, and are only accessible by visitors to this English Heritage site.
