= Anglo-Saxon settlement in the Netherlands =

The Anglo-Saxon settlement in the Netherlands was a movement of continental Angles, Saxons, Franks and possibly English Anglo-Saxons into the lands formerly inhabited by the ancient Frisii, Cananefates and Batavians. These migrations occurred after the population drop of the Frisii during the 5th century up until the 7th century. These new migrants from northwestern Germany were later referred to as the Frisians by the Merovingian Franks who may have taken this name from older Roman historiography. During these migrations, almost the entire population of the coastal Netherlands was demographically replaced.

== Background ==
The incoming tribes excluding the Franks would have spoken a North Sea Germanic language comparable to Old English but may have had diverse and separate identities at first instead of a single Frisian identity, which only developed later due to external influences. They would however have been culturally, religiously and linguistically closer to each other than to their southern Frankish neighbors, with whom they would have several wars. The cultural similarities between the North Sea Germanic cultures likely stimulated trade over the North Sea between Anglo-Saxon England and Frisia, exchanging products and possibly people.

The population decline of the Frisii was caused by flooding, disease and the fall of the Western Roman Empire. The population replacement was likely completely non-violent unlike the Anglo-Saxon settlement of Britain, as the adoption of the Frisian name by the newcomers suggests a peaceful merging of the larger incoming migrants and the smaller remaining population, comprising not only of old Frisii but also the remnants of the Batavians and Cananefates in the south.

== Evidence ==
Supporting evidence includes archeological finds, written records and linguistic studies.

=== Archeology ===
Archeological discoveries during the early 20th century refuted the long held belief that the Frisii were the ancestors of the medieval and modern Frisians by comparing pottery styles, brooches and burial practices before and after the population decline of the 5th century in the regions of Groningen, Friesland, Holland and Zeeland. Later pottery and burials showed clear Anglo-Saxon styles. These discoveries were controversial at the time (especially in Friesland), but were later repeatedly supported by subsequent archeological and toponymical research, especially after the 1990s. Dating toponyms, pottery types, metal objects and settlement structures revealed a clear discontinuity in the population of Friesland and also Holland, although some remaining toponyms and 4th century finds suggested that the former population of Holland was not fully replaced and would have had small amounts of ancestry from the former Frisii and perhaps Cananefates and Batavians.

=== Written accounts ===
Written accounts include the "Rijmkroniek van Holland", an anonymously written Hollandic historical account from 1280-1282. In it, the author writes that the Saxons lived in Holland, being called Frisians by the Romans because the Romans deemed it a frozen land. The author references an older 5th century book called "Historiae adversus paganos", which also places the Saxons along the North Sea coast. The lack of distinction between Saxons and Frisians meant that the Anglo-Saxons in Britain could be considered Frisian, which could explain why later, in the book "Spiegel historiael" from 1290, Hengist is called a Frisian. Willibrord, an Anglo-Saxon missionary to Frisia, was also mentioned as a Frisian by historians.

=== Linguistic evidence ===
Linguistically, old Frisian (which would have been spoken in Friesland, Groningen, Holland and Zeeland) and old English are very similar. They fall within the potential North Sea Germanic language family and more specifically the Anglo-Frisian language family. Old Frisian in Holland gradually merged with Low Franconian to create a new Hollandic dialect that was part Frisian, part Frankish. This influenced the course of the Dutch language, giving the language certain Ingvaeonic traits, even convincing some linguists to class Old Low Franconian or later Hollandic as descendants of North Sea Germanic or Ingvaeonic. Whether or not the pre-migration tribes spoke a different Germanic language is unclear, undermining the linguistic argument for the migration due to the possible pre-migration origin of the North Sea Germanic dialect. Nevertheless, the similarities between the languages point to a common origin of the old English and old Frisian populations, and by extension partially the western Dutch population.

== Legacy ==
The modern Frisian population today still lives in the Dutch province of Friesland, East Frisia and North Frisia in Germany. The Frisians in Holland eventually merged with the expanding imperial Franks to create a new Hollandic identity that became influential in the late middle ages to create the Dutch ethnicity, expanding northwards from South Holland. This change was made political in 1101 when count Floris II changed his title from count of West Frisia to count of Holland.
