= Housesteads Roman Fort =

Roman fort in Northumberland, England

Coordinates: 55.013°N 2.331°W

- Vercovicium, Borcovicium
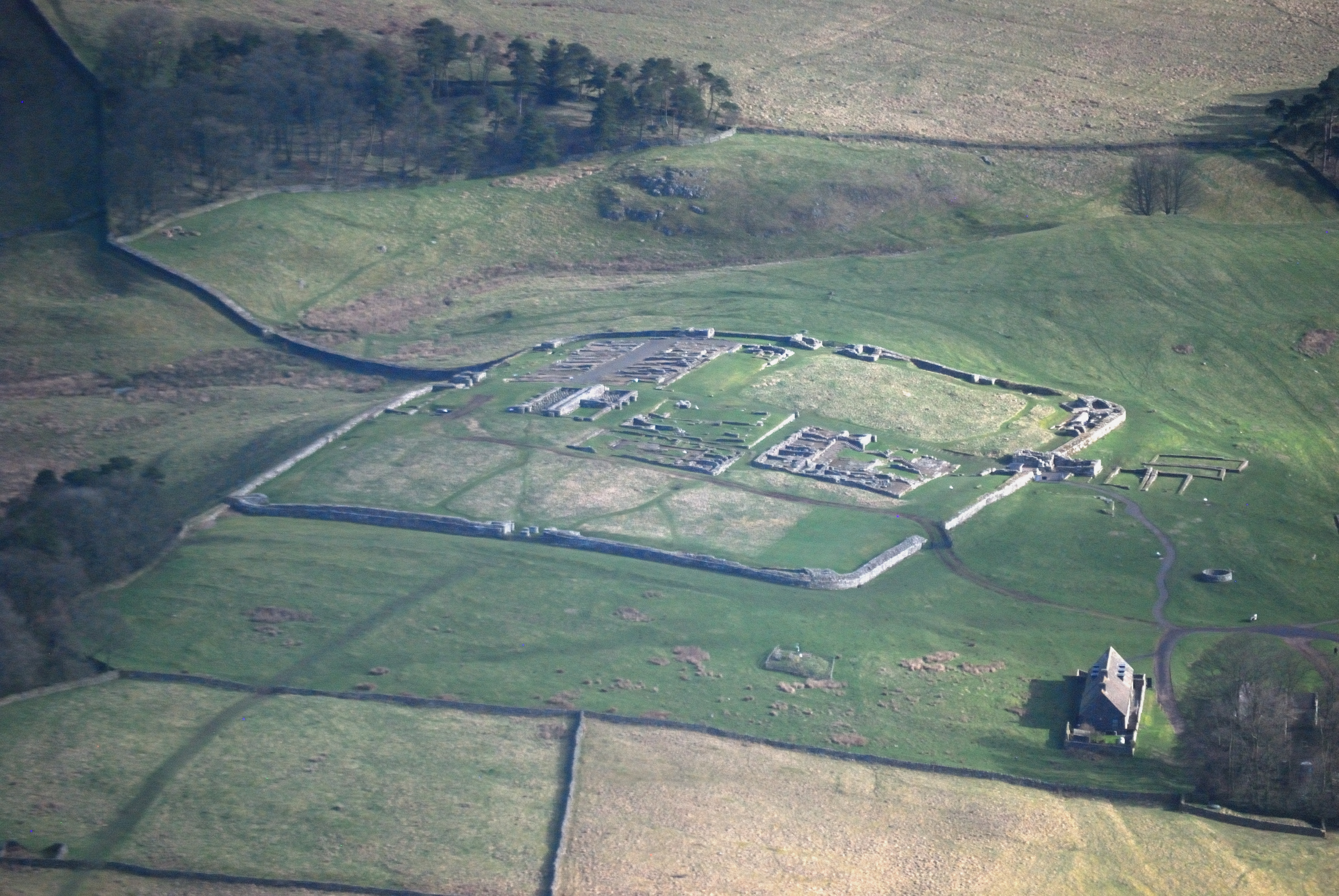

- Location within Northumberland
- Location: Hexham, Northumberland, England

History
- Abandoned: c. 400 AD

Site notes
- Website: National Trust

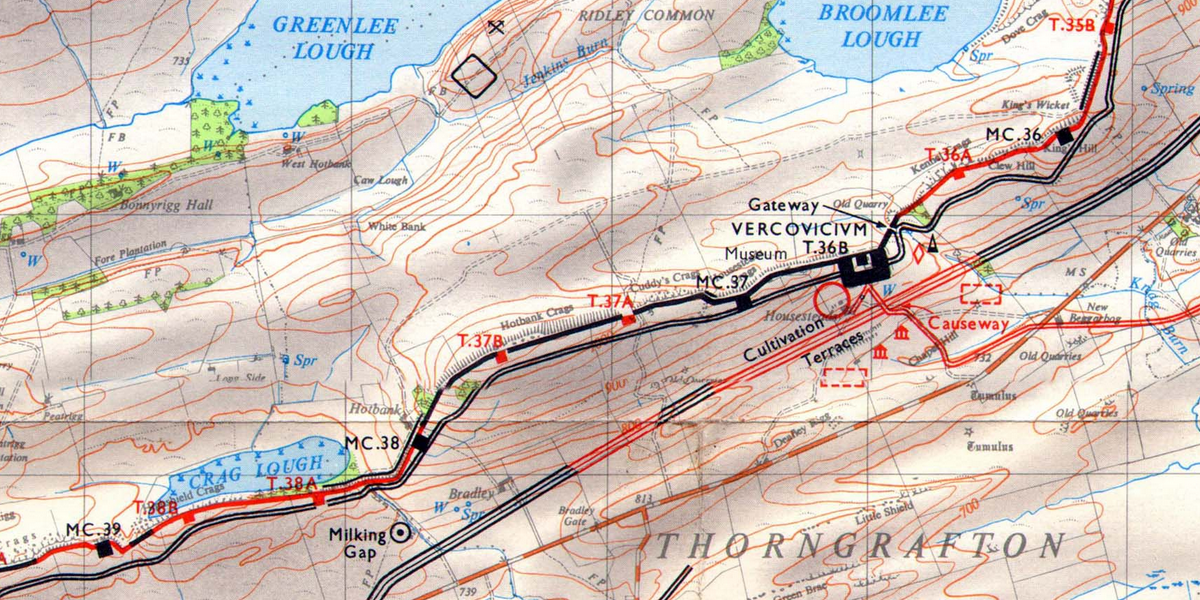
Vercovicium (1964 OS map)

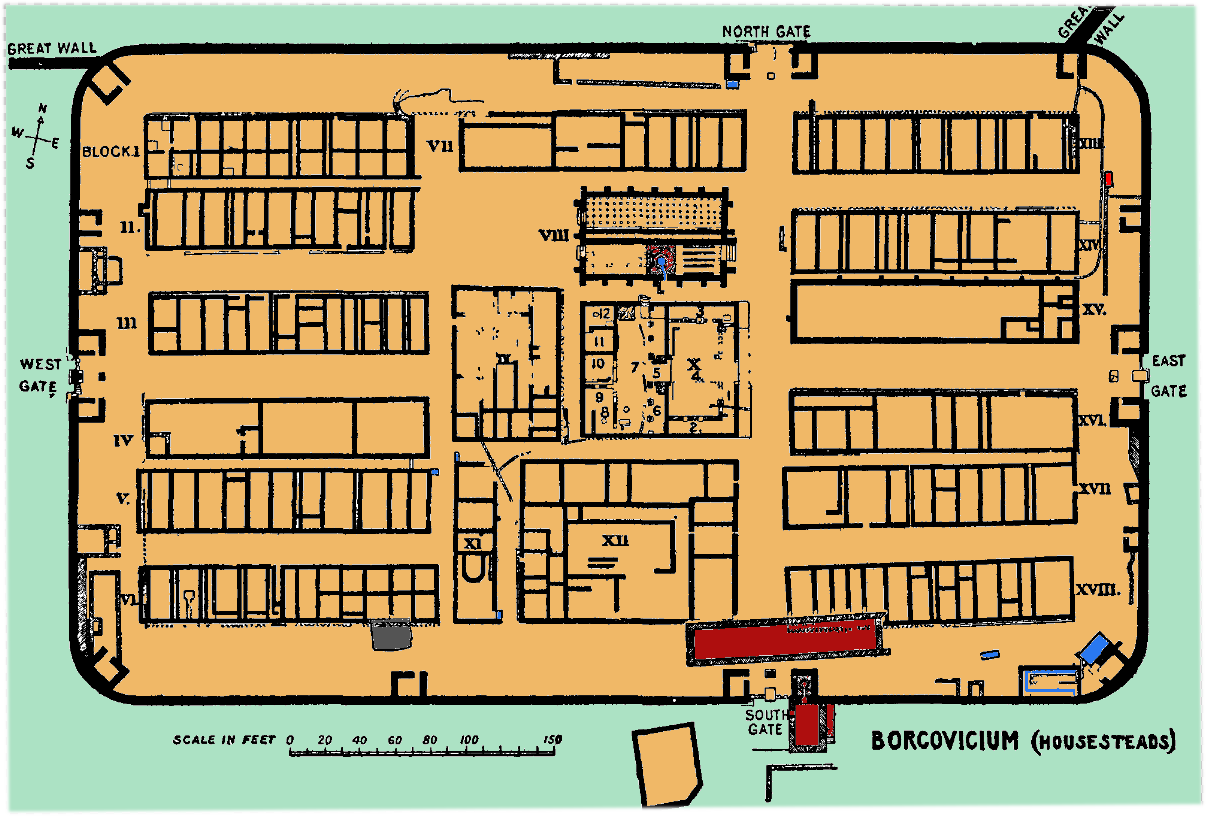
Plan of fort

Housesteads Roman Fort was an auxiliary fort on Hadrian's Wall, at Housesteads, Northumberland, England. It is dramatically positioned on the end of the 1-mile (1.6 km)-long crag of the Whin Sill over which the Wall runs, overlooking sparsely populated hills.

It was called the "grandest station" on the Wall and is one of the best-preserved and extensively displayed forts. It was occupied for almost 300 years. It was located 5.3 miles (8.5 km) west from Carrawburgh fort, 6 miles (9.7 km) east of Great Chesters fort and about 2-mile (3.2 km) north east of the existing fort at Vindolanda on the Stanegate road.

The site is now owned by the National Trust and is currently in the care of English Heritage. Finds from the fort can be seen in the site museum, in the museum at Chesters, and in the Great North Museum: Hancock in Newcastle upon Tyne.

== Name ==
The name of the fort has been given as Vercovicium, Borcovicus, Borcovicium, and Velurtion. An inscription found at Housesteads with the letters VER, is believed to be short for Ver(covicianorum), the letters ver being interchangeable with bor in later Latin.

The 18th-century farmhouse of Housesteads provides the modern name.

== History ==
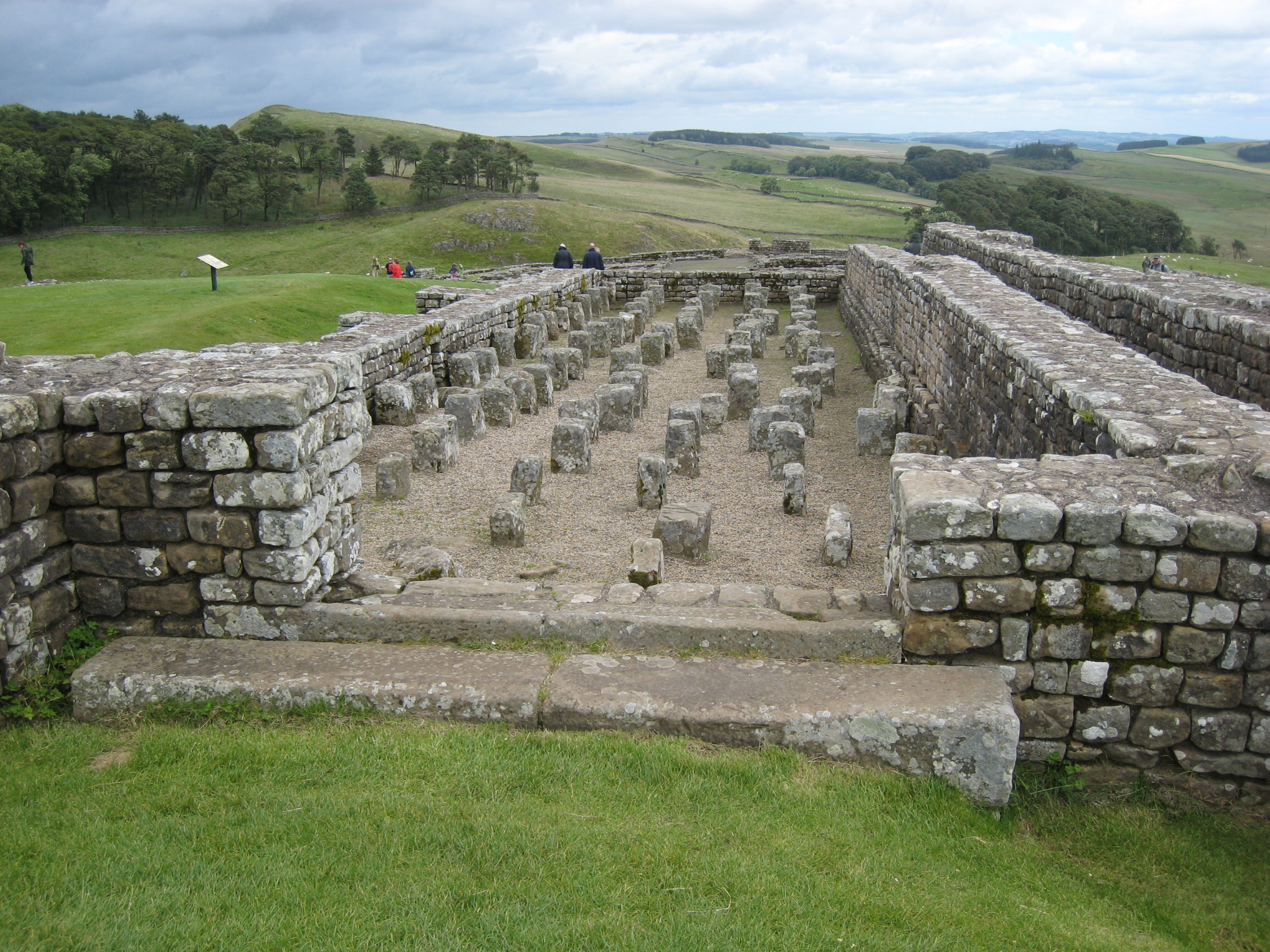
The northern granary looking east. The pillars supported a raised floor to keep food dry and free from vermin

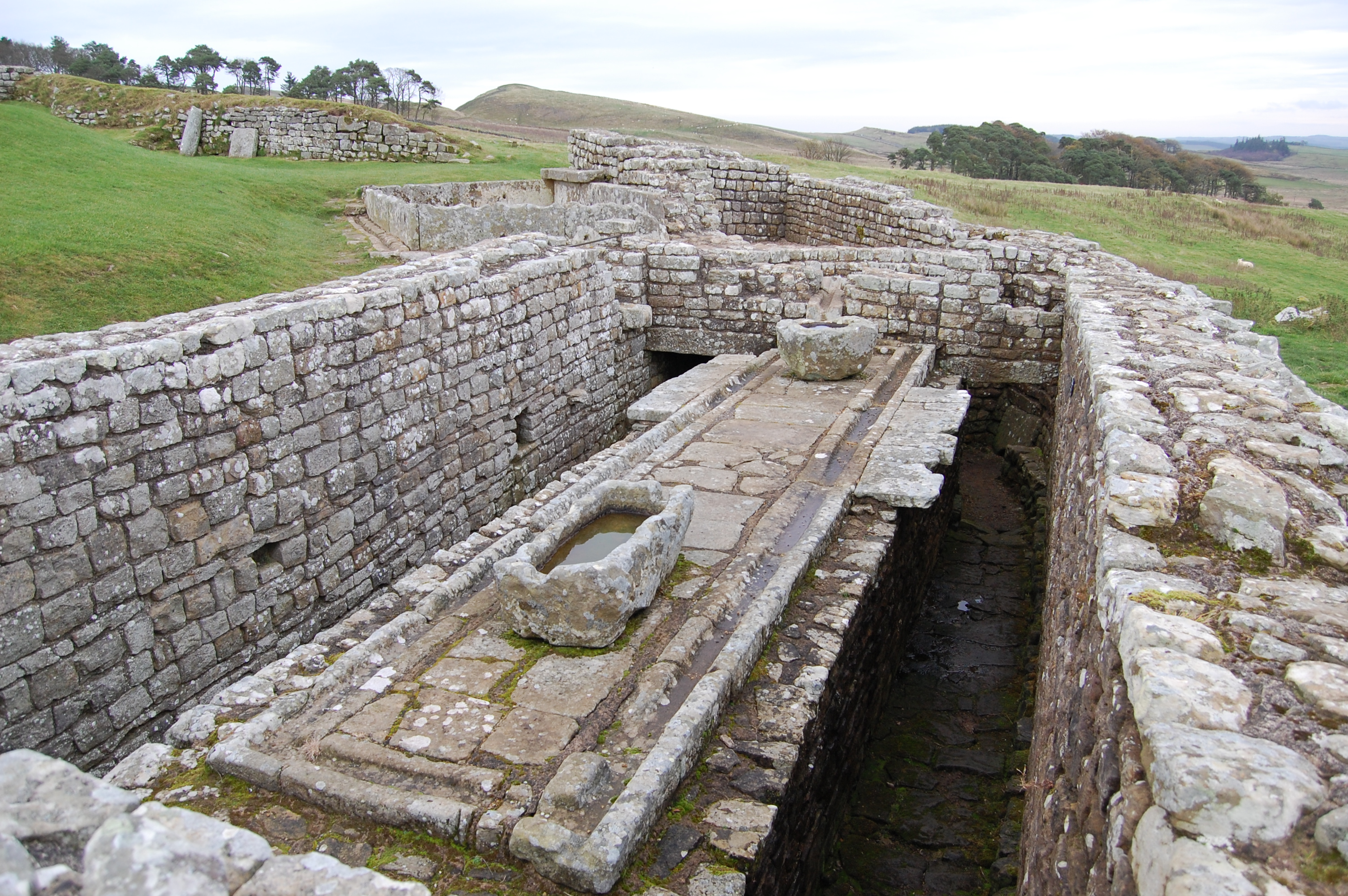
The latrines, hygienically placed at the lowest corner of the fort, supplied by a water tank at rear with original lead sealing between its slabs.

Hadrian's Wall was begun in AD 122 and included no forts but smaller milecastles but before it was finished there was a change of plan to include forts. Turret 36B on the site was therefore demolished to make way for the fort built in stone around AD 124 with its northern wall overlying the original Broad Wall foundation. The fort was repaired and rebuilt several times. A major rebuilding in the late 3rd/early 4th century included interval towers on the walls, a huge horreum (warehouse) and new barracks.

A substantial civil settlement (vicus) existed to the south, outside the fort, and some of the stone foundations can still be seen, including the so-called "Murder House", where two skeletons were found beneath an apparently newly-laid floor when excavated. The vicus was abandoned in about 270 before the rebuilding of the fort.

It is unusual for Britain in that it had no running water supply and was dependent upon rainwater collection, for which purpose there is a series of large stone-lined cisterns around the periphery of the defences. It also has one of the best-preserved stone latrines in Roman Britain.

== Garrison ==
In the 2nd century AD, the garrison consisted of an unknown double-sized auxiliary infantry cohort and a detachment of legionaries from Legio II Augusta. From 205/208 it comprised Cohors I Tungrorum (nominally 1000 strong) augmented by the numerus Hnaudifridi and the Cuneus Frisionum, a Frisian cavalry unit, cuneus referring to a wedge formation. The Tungrians were still there in the 4th century, according to the Notitia Dignitatum. By 409 AD the Romans had withdrawn.

== Housesteads farm ==
Housesteads is a former farm whose ruins remain built up against the south gate of the Roman fort. The farm was purchased by the amateur historian John Clayton in 1838, to add to his collection of Roman Wall farms. The Roman site was cleared of later buildings by Clayton, and the present farmhouse built about 1860. John Maurice Clayton attempted to auction the fort in 1929. It did not reach its reserve and was donated to the National Trust in 1930. The farm was later owned by the Trevelyans who gave the land for the site museum.

== See also ==
- History of Northumberland
